= Dogger Bank incident =

1904 Russian attack on British trawlers

Coordinates: 54.724°N 2.769°E

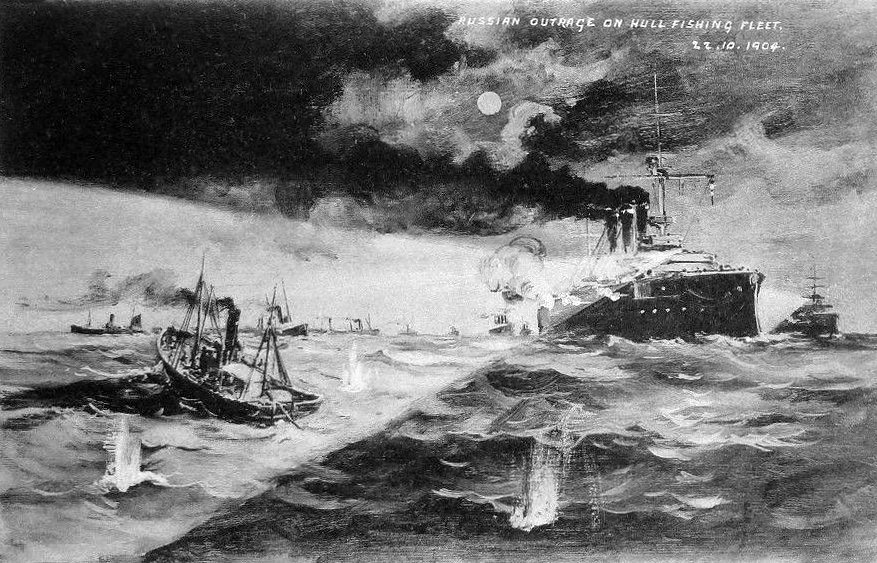
British postcard depicting the Russian warships firing on the fishing vessels

The Dogger Bank incident (also known as the North Sea Incident, the Russian Outrage or the Incident of Hull) occurred on the night of 21/22 October 1904, during the Russo-Japanese War, when the Baltic Fleet of the Imperial Russian Navy mistook civilian British fishing trawlers from Kingston upon Hull in the Dogger Bank area of the North Sea for Imperial Japanese Navy torpedo boats and fired on them, also firing on each other in the chaos of the melée.

Two British fishermen died, six more were injured, one fishing vessel was sunk, and five more boats were damaged. On the Russian side, one sailor and a Russian Orthodox priest aboard the cruiser Aurora were killed by friendly fire. The incident almost led to war between the United Kingdom and the Russian Empire. An international commission of inquiry based on the Hague Convention was set up and Russia voluntarily paid the victims compensation amounting to £66,000 (equivalent to £6,938,000 in 2025).

== Prelude ==
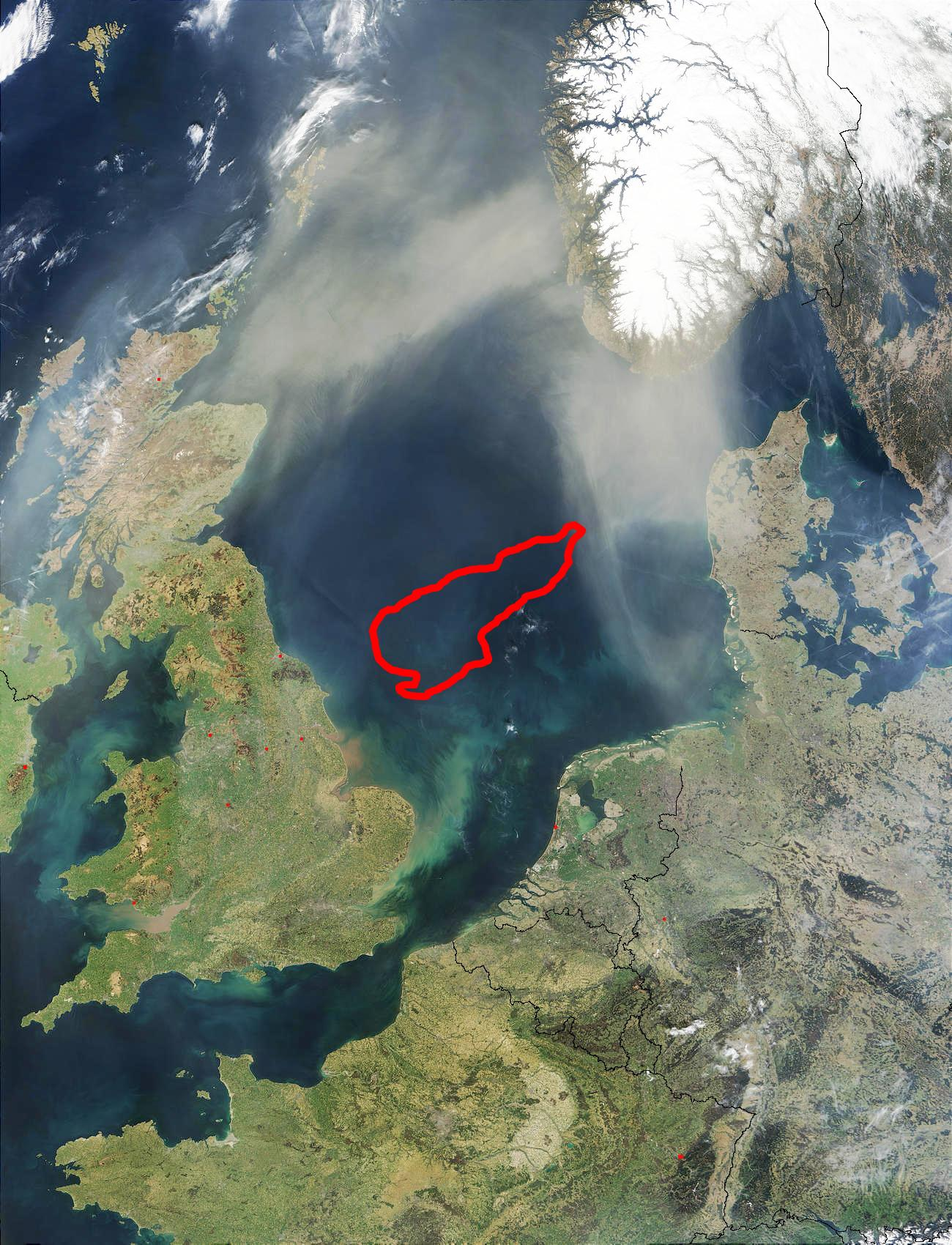
Location of the Dogger Bank in the North Sea.

The Russian warships involved in the incident were steaming to the Far East to reinforce the Russian 1st Pacific Squadron stationed at Port Arthur and later Vladivostok during the Russo-Japanese War. The various Russian intelligence agencies were not well coordinated and were prone to producing poor or false reports. Prior to the fleet setting off, Russian intelligence agents had been claiming that there were Japanese officers around the Baltic Sea with torpedoes and that Britain had built Japan six torpedo boats. It was known that enemy intelligence had been heavily active in the region. Torpedo boats, a recent development of the major navies, had the potential to damage and sink large warships and were very difficult to detect, which caused psychological stress to sailors at war.

Because of the fleet's alleged sightings of balloons and four enemy cruisers the day previously, coupled with "the possibility that the Japanese might surreptitiously have sent ships around the world to attack" them, Russian Admiral Zinovy Rozhestvensky called for increased vigilance and issued an order that "no vessel of any sort must be allowed to get in among the fleet".

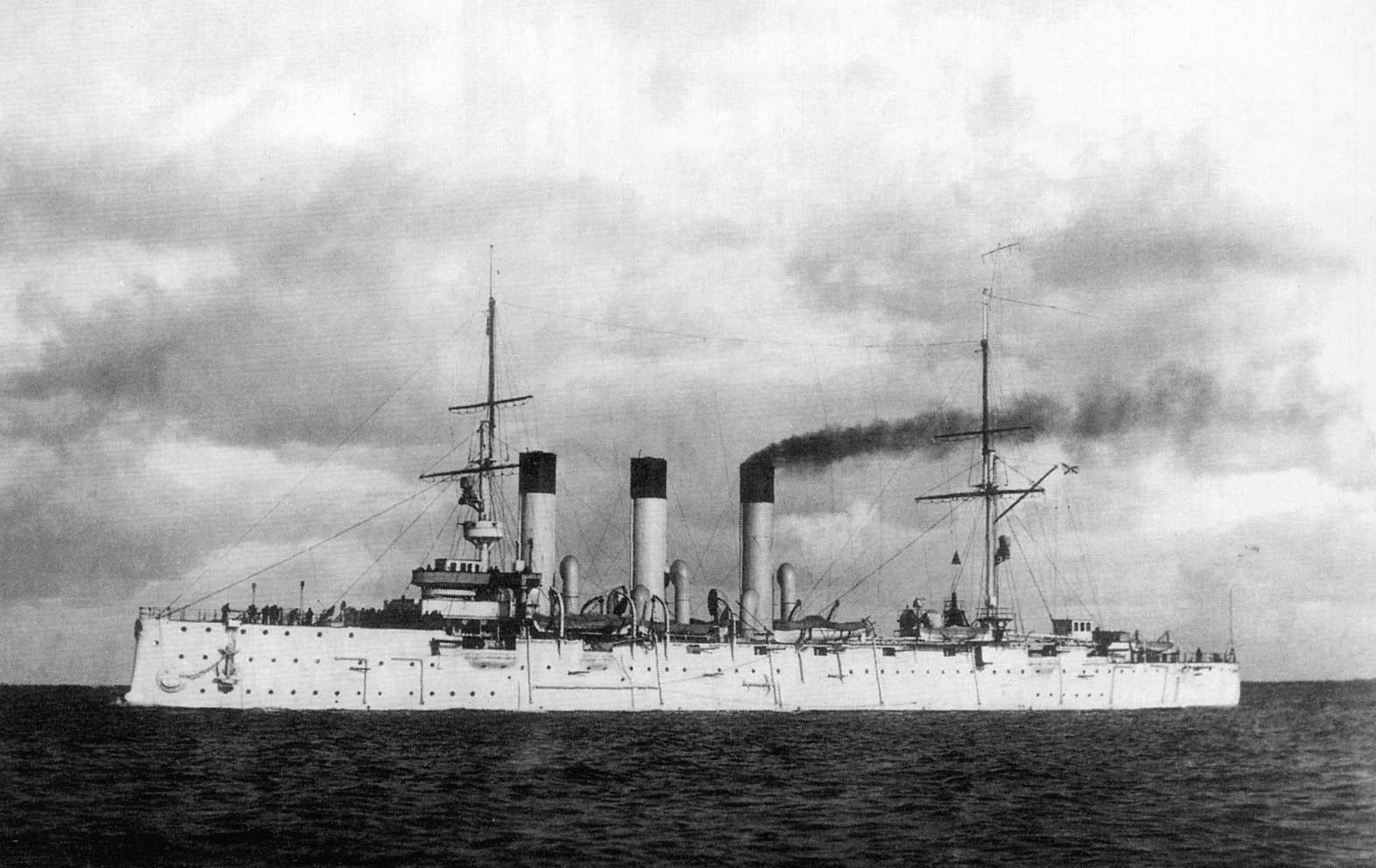
The Aurora, a Russian cruiser attacked by other Russian ships during the incident.

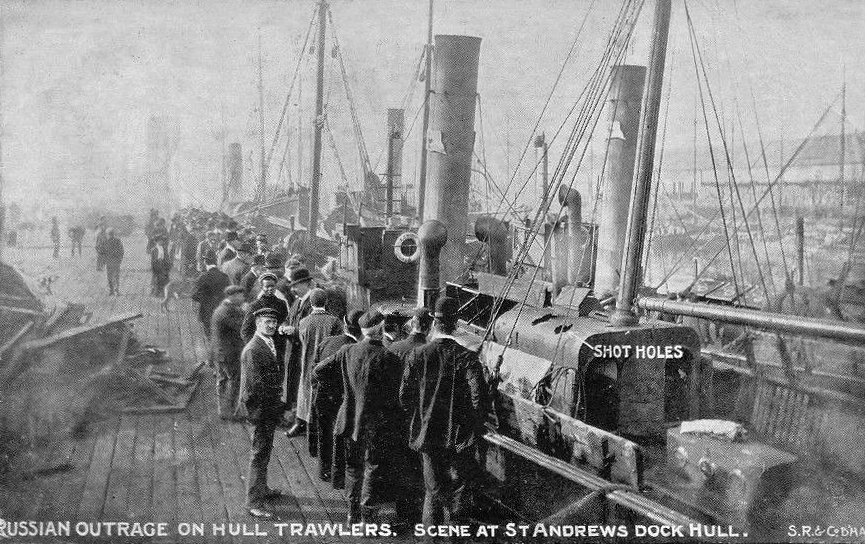
Damaged trawlers after return to St Andrews Dock, Hull

On 20 October, Rozhestvensky received a report from Arcadiy Harting that torpedo boats had been seen leaving Norway. He also received an intelligence report from the Russian transport Bakan in the Langeland Belt of "four torpedo-boats which only showed lights on the mizenmast-head so that at a distance, they might be taken for fishing boats". He took the report seriously, quickened his coaling and commenced sailing.

Similar accidents and rumours affected the Russian fleet. There was a general fear of attack, with widespread rumours that a fleet of Japanese torpedo boats were stationed off the Danish coast, talk of the Japanese having mined the seas, and alleged sightings of Japanese submarines. Before the Dogger Bank incident, the nervous Russian fleet had fired on fishermen carrying consular dispatches from Russia to them near the Danish coast. However, the Russian fleet's poor gunnery meant that no damage had been caused.

After navigating a non-existent minefield, the Russian fleet sailed into the North Sea. The disaster of 21 October began in the evening, when the captain of the supply ship Kamchatka (Камчатка), which was last in the Russian line, took a passing Swedish ship for a Japanese torpedo boat and radioed that he was being attacked.

== Incident ==
On 22 October at 0:55am, during fog, Rozhestvensky spotted unlit boats. He ordered a change of direction and the use of searchlights on the ships. The Russian warships illuminated the British fishing trawlers with their searchlights. Very shortly thereafter Rozhestvensky believed he saw a torpedo boat and ordered the ship to open fire. As the trawlers had their nets down, they were unable to flee. The British trawler Crane was sunk, and its captain and boatswain were killed. Four other trawlers were damaged, and six other fishermen were wounded, one of whom died a few months later.

In the general chaos, Russian ships began to shoot at each other. The cruisers Aurora (Аврора) and Dmitrii Donskoi (Дмитрій Донской) were taken for Japanese warships and bombarded by seven battleships sailing in formation, damaging both ships and killing a chaplain and at least one sailor and severely wounding another. During the pandemonium, several Russian ships signalled that torpedoes had hit them, and on board the battleship Borodino (Бородино), rumours spread that the ship was being boarded by the Japanese, with some crews donning life vests and lying prone on the deck and others drawing cutlasses. More serious losses to both sides were avoided only because of the extremely low quality of Russian gunnery, with the battleship Oryol (Орёлъ) reportedly firing more than 500 shells without hitting anything.

After ten minutes of gunfire, the fishermen finally saw a blue light signal on one of the warships, the order to cease firing.

== Aftermath ==
The incident led to a serious diplomatic conflict between Russia and Britain, which was particularly dangerous because of the Anglo-Japanese Alliance. In the aftermath, some British newspapers called the Russian fleet 'pirates', and Admiral Rozhestvensky was heavily criticised for not leaving the British fishermen lifeboats. The editorial of the morning's Times was particularly scathing:

It is almost inconceivable that any men calling themselves seamen, however frightened they might be, could spend twenty minutes bombarding a fleet of fishing boats without discovering the nature of their target.

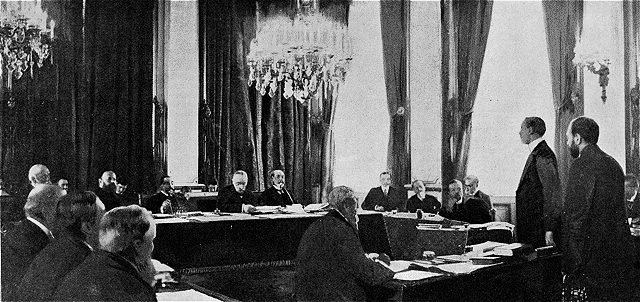
Session of the International Commission of Inquiry

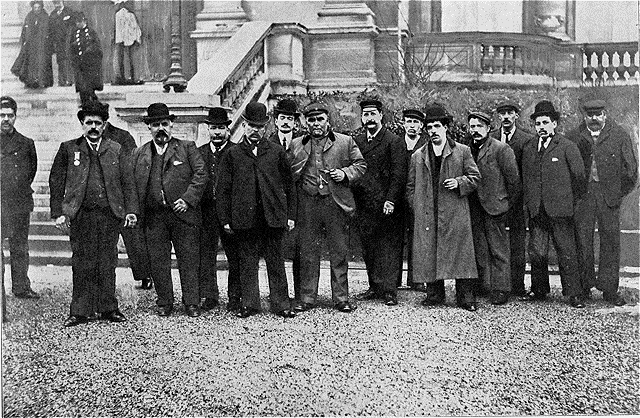
British fishermen in Paris to testify before the Commission

The Royal Navy prepared for war, with 28 battleships of the Home Fleet being ordered to raise steam and prepare for action, while British cruiser squadrons shadowed the Russian fleet as it made its way through the Bay of Biscay and down the coast of Portugal. Rozhestvensky's initial defence in part relied on reports by some of the fishermen that they had seen a torpedo destroyer loitering in the area until dawn. Since the Russian fleet did not contain such a vessel he argued it must have been a Japanese torpedo boat. The British dismissed this claim, suggesting if they had seen anything, it was the Kamchatka, although they did perform quiet enquires of the navies in the area to rule them out. No non-Russian warship has ever been identified as being in the area and it's unclear what, if anything, the fishermen saw.

Under diplomatic pressure, the Russian government agreed to investigate the incident, and Rozhestvensky was ordered to dock in Vigo, Spain, where he left behind those officers considered responsible (as well as at least one officer who had been critical of him) before leaving on 1 November.

From Vigo, the main Russian fleet then approached Tangier, Morocco, and lost contact with the Kamchatka for several days. The Kamchatka eventually rejoined the fleet and claimed that she had engaged three Japanese warships and fired over 300 shells. The ships she had actually fired at were a Swedish merchantman, a German trawler, and a French schooner. As the fleet left Tangiers on 5 November, one ship accidentally severed the city's underwater telegraph cable with her anchor, preventing communications with Europe for four days. The British Government sent instructions to the Royal Navy that crisis had come to an end on 11 November.

Concerns that the draught of the newer battleships, which had proven to be considerably greater than designed, would prevent their passage through the Suez Canal caused the fleet to separate after leaving Tangiers on 3 November 1904. These concerns though may have been an excuse to hide worries over passing through British-controlled waters. The newer battleships and a few cruisers proceeded around the Cape of Good Hope under Rozhestvensky while the older battleships and lighter cruisers passed through the Suez Canal under the command of Admiral Dmitry Gustavovich von Fölkersahm. Both sections of the fleet then rendezvoused at Madagascar as planned. The fleet then proceeded to the Sea of Japan, where it was later soundly defeated in the Battle of Tsushima in May 1905.

On 25 November 1904, the British and Russian governments signed a joint agreement in which they agreed to submit the issue to an international commission of inquiry whose proceedings were to be based on the Hague Convention. The International Commission met in Paris from 9 January to 25 February 1905. The report produced by the International Commission concluded that "the commissioners declare that their findings, which are therein formulated, are not, in their opinion, of a nature to cast any discredit upon the military qualities or the humanity of Admiral Rozhestvensky, or of the personnel of his squadron". It also concluded that "the commissioners take pleasure in recognising, unanimously, that Admiral Rozhestvensky personally did everything he could, from beginning to end of the incident, to prevent trawlers, recognised as such, from being fired upon by the squadron".

"Damage to the Aurora was concealed ... and only discovered by the deciphering of a Wireless message intercepted at [the British] Felixstowe station. It was also considered highly significant that no officer from that ship appeared before the [international commission of inquiry], nor were their logs produced."

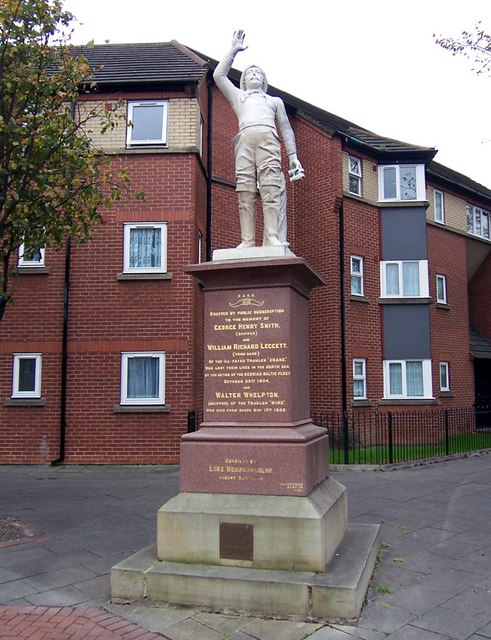
Fisherman's Memorial

Russia voluntarily paid compensation of £66,000 to the fishermen. In 1906, the Fisherman's Memorial was unveiled in Hull to commemorate the deaths of the three British sailors. The memorial, approximately 18 feet high, shows the dead fisherman George Henry Smith and carries the following inscription:

Erected by public subscription to the memory of George Henry Smith, (skipper) and William Richard Leggett, (third hand) of the ill-fated trawler "Crane", who lost their lives in the North Sea by the action of the Russian Baltic Fleet October 22nd 1904, and Walter Whelpton, (skipper) of the trawler "Mino", who died from shock May 13, 1905.

== Sources ==
- Busch, Noel F. (1969). The Emperor's Sword: Japan vs Russia in the Battle of Tsushima. New York: Funk and Wagnalls.
- Connaughton, Richard Michael (1988). The War of the Rising Sun and Tumbling Bear. New York City: Routledge. ISBN 978-0-415-07143-7.
- Corbett, Julian (2015a) [Jan 1914]. Maritime Operations In The Russo-Japanese War 1904–1905. Vol. 1. Naval Institute Press. ISBN 978-1-59114-197-6.
- Corbett, Julian (2015b) [Oct 1915]. Maritime Operations In The Russo-Japanese War 1904–1905. Vol. 2. Naval Institute Press. ISBN 978-1-59114-198-3.
- Credland, Arthur (2004). North Sea Incident. Hull: Hull Museums and Galleries.
- Jackson, Karen Kitzman (1974). The Dogger Bank Incident and the Development of International Arbitration (PDF) (M.A.). Texas Tech University. Archived from the original (PDF) on 12 April 2017.
- Lebow, Richard Ned (1978). "Accidents and Crises: The Dogger Bank Affair". Naval War College Review (31): 66–75.
- Lewis, Brian (1983). The Day the Russian Imperial Fleet Fired on the Hull Trawlermen. City of Kingston-upon-Hull Museums and Art Galleries.
- Merills, J.G. (1999). International Dispute Settlement. Cambridge University: Cambridge University Press.
- Pleshakov, Constantine (2002). The Tsar's Last Armada. Oxford: Basic Books. ISBN 1-903985-31-5.
- Simpson, Richard V. (2001). Building The Mosquito Fleet, The US Navy's First Torpedo Boats. Charleston: Arcadia Publishing. ISBN 0-7385-0508-0.
- Westwood, John N. (1986). Russia against Japan 1904–05: A New Look at the Russo-Japanese War. Houndmills.
- Wood, Walter (1911). North Sea fishers and fighters. London: Kegan Paul, Trench, Trübner & Co.
