= Ministry of Police of the Russian Empire =

Government agency of Russian Empire

Ministry of Police
- Министерство полиции Российской империи Ministerstvo politsii Rossijskoj imperii
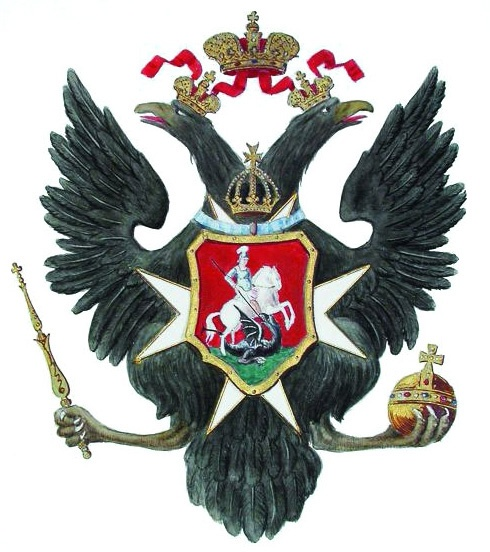
- Emblem of the Russian Empire which was used as the ministry emblem

Agency overview
- Formed: 1810
- Dissolved: 1819
- Superseding agency: Ministry of Internal Affairs
- Jurisdiction: Emperor of All Russia
- Headquarters: Saint Petersburg, Russian Empire
- Parent agency: Council of Ministers
- Child agency: Police Department of Russia

Ministry of Police of the Russian Empire (Russian: Министерство полиции Российской империи) was created in the course of Government reform of Alexander I in 1810 and existed till 1819 when it was succeeded by the Ministry of Internal Affairs. During its existence it was subordinated to the Council of Ministers of the Russian Empire.

== Ministry objectives and credentials ==
- Carrying out recruitment in the Army;
- Protection of the state stocks of the foodstuffs;
- The customs supervision;
- The maintenance and use of the toil of convicted;
- Maintenance of serviceability and safety of communications;
- Also, the ministry should carry out obvious and secret supervision of foreigners in Russia, carry out censorship functions.

In view of importance of the functions assigned to the Ministry, for it has been developed and simultaneously with ukaz about establishment of the ministries was published Establishment and the order to minister of police, which became a normative basis of its organization and activity. A component of it were Rules of the especial responsibility of minister of police. Operating in force-majeure (definition and conditions force-majeure were not given), minister of police could demand in the order of an army, bypassing military minister and giving direct orders to commanders of regiments. The special paragraph of the General establishment of the ministries provided exemption from liability of minister for excess of authority if it operated in kinds of the general safety.

Except for protection of internal security the Ministry of police was allocated with the right to supervise for final execution of laws on all in general to the ministries. Minister of police had the right to demand data from all local bodies, bypassing the corresponding ministries. Decrees, the circulars concerning activity of the local bodies of the various ministries, went to provinces for the official of the Ministry of police who by means of police watched their observance. That the police stood apart from the administrative system, was above it, supervising its activity. Such order has been fixed in Establishment of the Ministry of Finance where was specified that the use of the sums, allocated for local provincial bodies should be made under supervision of the Ministry of police.

== Leaders of the ministry ==
First minister of police was the general-aide-de-camp of emperor Alexander I Alexander Balashov, who has been appointed into the front-line army from the beginning of Patriotic War of 1812, carrying out especially important missions of Emperor, including negotiations with Napoleon. Acting and actually minister of police, till 1819 was Sergey Vyazmitinov, in the past - the first Minister of Land Forces. Heading the Ministry of police, he was simultaneously the War Governor of Saint Petersburg. By testimonies of contemporaries, how many useless victims of suspicion would fall in Petersburg (in 1812), if not experience and philanthropy of S.K.Vjazmitinov.

== Structure of the ministry ==
Ministry consisted of three departments:

- Department of economic police. The competence of this department included the control over observance of provisioning of cities, especially Saint Petersburg and Moscow, suppression of profiteering, and also supervision for prisons and workhouses.
- Department of executive police. This department was formed on the basis of Expedition of the state accomplishment (Экспедиции государственного благоустройства) of the Ministry of Internal Affairs. Department consisted of three sections.
  - First Section recruited staff for the various police services, collected statistical data, registered the incidents, the facts of a birth and death for what special forms of the account have been introduced.
  - Second Section carried out supervision of investigations on criminal cases, and also polices of judgement affairs, supervised execution by police of adjudications.
  - Third Section was entrusted for promoting in the organization and carrying out of the general audits of governorates. Capture of deserters and other problems were assigned to it also the maintenance of militia.
- Medical department managed sanitary inspection, the organization of efforts on prevention of epidemics and epizootic, supply by medicines.
- Also the general and especial offices of minister.

== Abolishment ==
Creation of the Ministry of police has been apprehended by a significant part influential state and public figures with displeasure. Nikolai Karamzin sneered at that when have noticed excessive multicomplexity of the Ministry of Internal Affairs, have realized the next reorganization of the central bodies and have created the Ministry of police so multicomplex and not clear for Russian. Incomprehensibility consist, first of all, in granting to the Ministry of police of the right to supervise local bodies of other ministries that put it as though above local institutions. Practice of functioning of the Ministry of police has proved, that its creation has not given expected result but complicated and has confused interaction of local bodies.

After the audits of police institutions, the emperor was convinced of the weakness of the police administration. Liquidation of the ministry was predetermined. Viktor Kochubey, in 1819 again appointed to the post of Minister of Internal Affairs, has proved to the czsar necessity of returning of functions of police management to the Ministry of Internal Affairs and liquidation of not popular Ministry of Police. After death of Sergey Vyazmitinov a new minister was not appointed. The management of the ministry was temporarily transferred to chairman of Committee of Ministers and manager of Especial office of minister of police reported on his activity personally to the czar.

Abolishment of the Ministry of police and transfer of its functions to the Ministry of Internal Affairs was regarded by the majority of high-ranking officials of empire as the correct decision. But in the beginning of the reign of emperor Nicholas I the question of creation of the Ministry of police was discussed again.

== List of ministers ==
- Alexander Balashov 1810 – 1812
- Sergey Vyazmitinov 1812 – 1819
- Alexander Balashov 1819

== See also ==
- Okhrana
- Russian police, current federal police
- Police Department, former Czarist police
- Special Corps of Gendarmes
- MVD
- Anton Devier
- Ministry of Police (disambiguation)
