= Sergey Vyazmitinov =

Russian general and statesman (1744–1819)

Count Sergey Vyazmitinov
- Сергей Вязмитинов
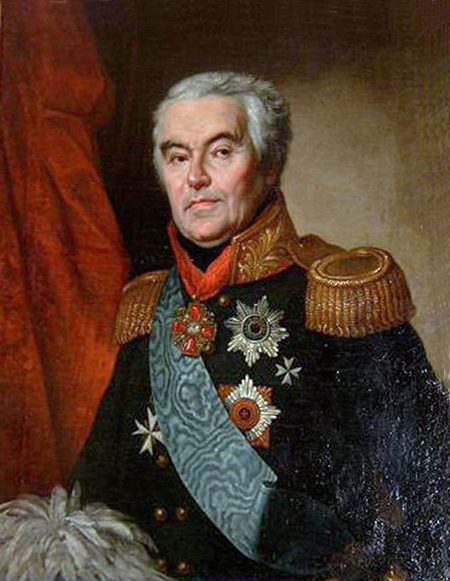

Governor General of Saint Petersburg
- In office 10 November 1816 – 31 August 1818; 10 September 1805 – 12 January 1808
- Preceded by: Alexander Balashov; Pyotr Tolstoy
- Succeeded by: Mikhail Miloradovich; Dmitry Lobanov-Rostovsky

Minister of Police
- In office 1812–1819
- Preceded by: Alexander Balashov
- Succeeded by: Alexander Balashov

Minister of Land Forces
- In office 1802–1808
- Preceded by: office established
- Succeeded by: Alexey Arakcheyev

Personal details
- Born: 7 October 1744 Rylsky Uyezd, Russian Empire
- Died: 15 October 1819 (aged 75) Saint Petersburg, Russian Empire

Military service
- Allegiance: Russia
- Branch/service: Imperial Russian Army
- Years of service: 1759–1819
- Rank: General of the Infantry

Count Sergey Kuzmich Vyazmitinov (Russian: Серге́й Кузьми́ч Вязмити́нов/Вязьмити́нов; 7 October 1744 – 15 October 1819) was a Russian general and statesman.

== Biography ==
He descended from the ancient noble landowner's family of Ruthenian origin, known from the end of the 15th century. On 22 June 1759 he was recorded as corporal into the Observational Corps, but started service only on 21 December 1761 as ensign of Ukrainian Narodnoe Opolcheniye Corps. In 1762 he was moved into Manezh Company (Манежная рота).

During the Russo-Turkish War, 1768–1774 he was aide-de-camp of the Vice President of the War Collegium Count Zakhar Chernyshev, from 1770 he was a generals-auditor-lieutenants in the rank of premier-major, manager of the affairs of the march office of Chernyshev (from October 1771 of Count Peter Rumyantsev-Zadunaysky). In 1777 he was promoted to colonel and was appointed as the commander of Astrakhan infantry regiment.

On 22 September 1786 he obtained the rank of major general and became the commander of the Astrakhan grenadier regiment for whose formation he was chiefly responsible. During Russo-Turkish War, 1787–1792 he commanded joined forces of the chasseurs and grenadiers battalions and participated in the taking of Khotin, Akkerman and Bendery.

From 1 March 1790 Vyazmyatinov was the ruler of Mogilev's deputy and the commander of Belarusian chasseur Corps. On 2 September 1793 he was promoted to lieutenant-general, from 4 March 1794 Senator. In September 1794 he was appointed acting Governor General of Simbirsk and Ufa.

From 1795 he commanded the Orenburg Corps. He helped stifle a rebellion of Kyrgyz and secured election as the khan of the Russian-backed puppet. From 29 November 1796 he was Orenburg military governor and the chief of Moscow musketeer regiment. He was a military governor of Kamenets-Podolskiy from 1 December 1796, from 3 December 1796 Governor General of Malorossiya, from 13 January 1797 commandant of Peter and Paul Fortress and the chief of its garrison regiment. Simultaneously (from 24 April 1797) he commanded the Commissariat Department.

On 5 November 1799 Vyazmyatinov was dismissed from the military service. On 9 September 1801 he was appointed the civil governor of Malorossiya. From 1 January 1802 he was the Vice President of the War Collegium and from 15 January simultaneously a senator and a member of the Permanent Council (Непременный Совет). After the creation of Ministry of Land Forces on 8 September he became the first Defense Minister of Russia and carried out enormous work on the reorganization of the Arms Forces Administration.

During his departure into front-line army (1805) emperor Alexander I left Vyazmitinov as the commander-in-chief in St.Petersburg. 13 January 1808 he was dismissed (one of the reasons were the large scale of abuses by the commissariat officials). On 20 April 1811 he was newly accepted to the service, and with appointment as a member of the State Council.

From 25 March 1812 he was a member of the Committee of Ministers, and from 28 March Vyazmitinov was the commander-in-chief in St.Petersburg during absence of the Emperor, managing the Ministry of Police. Simultaneously, from 9 September 1812 he was the Chairman of the Committee of Ministers, and from 30 October 1816 military Governor General of St.Petersburg.

On 19 August 1818 Vyazmitinov was granted a comital title. He was buried in the Lazarev burial-vault of the Alexander Nevsky Monastery.

== See also ==
- Third Partition of Poland

Government offices
Preceded by Pyotr Rumyantsev as General Governor of Kiev, Chernigov, Novgorod-Siversky	General Governor of Little Russia (Kamenets-Podolsky); 1796–1802	Succeeded by Alexey Kurakin as General Governor of Little Russia
Preceded by Pyotr Tolstoy	War Governor of Saint Petersburg; 1805 – 1808	Succeeded by Dmitry Lobanov-Rostovskiy
Preceded by Alexander Balashov	War Governor of Saint Petersburg; 1816 – 1818	Succeeded by Mikhail Miloradovich
Preceded by Alexander Balashov	Minister of Police; 1812 – 1819	Succeeded by Alexander Balashov
Preceded by New Creation	Minister of Land Forces; 1802 – 1808	Succeeded by Alexey Arakcheyev
