= Vladimir Dzhunkovsky =

Russian politician (1865–1938)

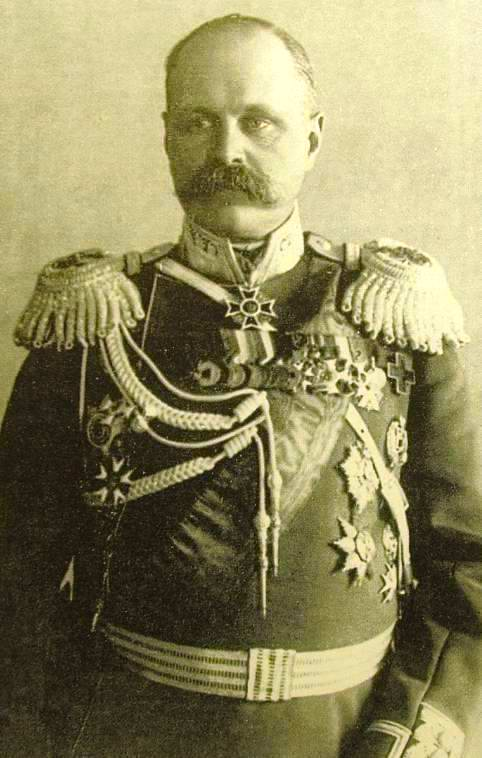
- Born: 19 November 1865
- Died: 21 February 1938 (aged 72); Moscow, Russian SFSR, Soviet Union
- Burial place: Butovo firing range
- Military career
- Allegiance: Russian Empire
- Rank: Lieutenant General

Vladimir Fyodorovich Dzhunkovsky (Russian: Влади́мир Фёдорович Джунко́вский, 19 September [O.S. 7 September] 1865, Saint Petersburg - February 21, 1938, Moscow) was a Russian statesman. He held the posts of the Governor of Moscow Governorate and the Governor-General of Moscow (August 6, 1908 - January 25, 1913).

== Biography ==
Dzhunkovsky was a scion of nobles from Poltava Governorate. An alumnus of the Page Corps, he started the military service in the Imperial Guard (Russia) of Preobrazhensky Regiment. Dzhunkovsky served as adjutant of Grand Duke Sergei Alexandrovich, the head of the Moscow City Board of the People's Soberness Trusteeship and the Chief of the Special Corps of Gendarmes.

=== State service ===
In 1908 he was appointed Governor-General of Moscow. Dzhunkovsky's governorship was marked by the bloom of cultural life in Moscow as several hubs have been opened. Dzhunkovsky was considered to be affiliated with Freemasons.

In 1913 he was appointed First Deputy Interior Minister, head of the Okhrana and purified the police. When he discovered that Roman Malinovsky, who headed the Bolshevik delegation in the Fourth Duma, was also a highly paid police agent, he decided that the risk of a scandal was too great, and ordered that Malinovsky had to quit and leave Russia. Two years later, in June 1915 he was responsible for a report on the drunk Grigori Rasputin after the alleged incident in the Yar restaurant in March. Besides Dzhunkovsky failed to get his hands on a manuscript written by Iliodor. On August 19, 1915, he was discharged from most of his posts. Stepan Beletsky became his successor. In January 1916 Dzhunkovsky was sent to Siberia where he commanded the 15th Siberian Rifle Division on the Western Front (Russian Empire). In April, 1917 he gained the rank of General-Lieutenant; in September he commanded the 3rd Siberian Army Corps.

=== Life after revolution and death ===
Following the Russian Revolution, Dzhunkovsky was released from all official duties. In 1918 he was arrested by Soviet security services, who accused him of aiding in the suppression of the Revolution of 1905. Dzhunkovsky was imprisoned in the Butyrka and Taganka prisons. In 1918, he was called as a witness when Malinovsky was put on trial.

In 1921 Dzhunkovsky was released as he was able to prove himself loyal to the new government. During the 1920s he served as security consultant of OGPU. He is credited as one of the creators of the Soviet Union's passport system.

In the fall of 1937, during the Stalinist repressions, he was arrested again. Dzhunkovsky was sentenced to death and executed on February 21, 1938. He was buried at the Butovo firing range.
