= Casimir Pilenas =

British intelligence agent

Casimir Pilenas, a.k.a. Casimir Palmer, and a.k.a., Casimir Palmer-Pilenas, was a private investigator, a British intelligence agent, and a "spotter" for Scotland Yard.

== Biography ==
According to study by Rita T. Kronenbitter, Pilenas was spotter for Scotland Yard and was recruited by Pyotr Rachkovsky as an informant for Russian Okhrana to work among the Latvian terrorists.

In 1911 Casimir Pilenas testified at the Houndsditch murders trial. His occupation was given as interpreter in Thames Police Court.

In 1917, as a British intelligence informant, he caused the arrest of Leon Trotsky in Nova Scotia by British naval authorities acting on instructions from Britain's Admiralty's Naval Intelligence Division. Palmer-Pilenas accused Trotsky of carrying $10,000 which he alleged had been provided by pro-German sources. But no such money was found on Trotsky, or his five companions at the time of his arrest and subsequent internment.

John Higham, in his work, Strangers in the Land, says:

The "Protocols" reached America in 1918 through Czarist army officers who had come to this country on a military mission, notably through Lieutenant Boris Brasol. Brasol foisted upon the Military Intelligence Division of the United States Army an English translation of the "Protocols" and started typewritten copies circulating in other influential circles in Washington, D.C. A renegade associate, one Casimir Pilenas, tried to extort $50,000 for the manuscript from the American Jewish Committee (AJC).

In making this claim Higham relies on archival material cited in his endnotes, material described as records of the AJC.

However, this claim of "extortion" is not supported by the file on Pilenas held by the AJC. And in fact these records show that his motives were not regarded as malicious by the AJC, and that he apparently acted as an informer for the AJC, regarding antisemitism, and antisemites, for some years thereafter, and that he apparently wanted to sell his services, and the records which he obtained, to the ADL. He also sought assistance from the AJC in having his material on antisemitism published.

In 1923 Pilenas wrote comment to NYT on Lithuanian annexation of Memel.

In 1933 Casimir Palmer, a resident of 11 West 108th Street in Manhattan at the time, appeared as witness in court during the hearings in the Russian Volunteer Fleet Corporation case. Palmer was called as a witness by Charles Recht, who assailed credibility of Boris Brasol, expert witness in the case.

On the stand Pilenas-Palmer described himself as a former agent of the British military intelligence service and as a former employee of the United States military intelligence division. He answered questions regarding his investigation of reports made by Boris Brasol to the War Department "regarding alleged radical activities by Jews during the war." Pilenas testified that he requested and received from Brasol a copy of the "Protocols of the Wise Men of Zion." Pilenas further testified that Brasol had written on several occasions to the US intelligence department concerning "radical movements among the Jews".

He allegedly worked as a "government intelligence agent" and by 1937 attempted to expose the link between Henry Ford and the Nazis. Says Albert Lee, in his Henry Ford and the Jews:

Detective Casimir Palmer who had been involved as a government intelligence agent since Boris Brasol brought the Protocols to America, wrote to Professor Nathan Isaacs in 1937 that "Henry Ford and his subordinates Ernest G. Liebold, Harry Bennett, and others have turned the Ford Motor Company Chemical Department into the headquarters of the Nazis here. [p. 95]

== See also ==
- Protocols of Zion

== Sources ==
- Strangers in the Land by John Higham (New York: Atheneum, 1981) p. 280; endnote 36, p. 387
- Henry Ford and the Jews by Albert Lee (New York: Stein and Day, 1980) p. 48
