= Alexander Balashov =

Russian general and statesman (1770–1837)

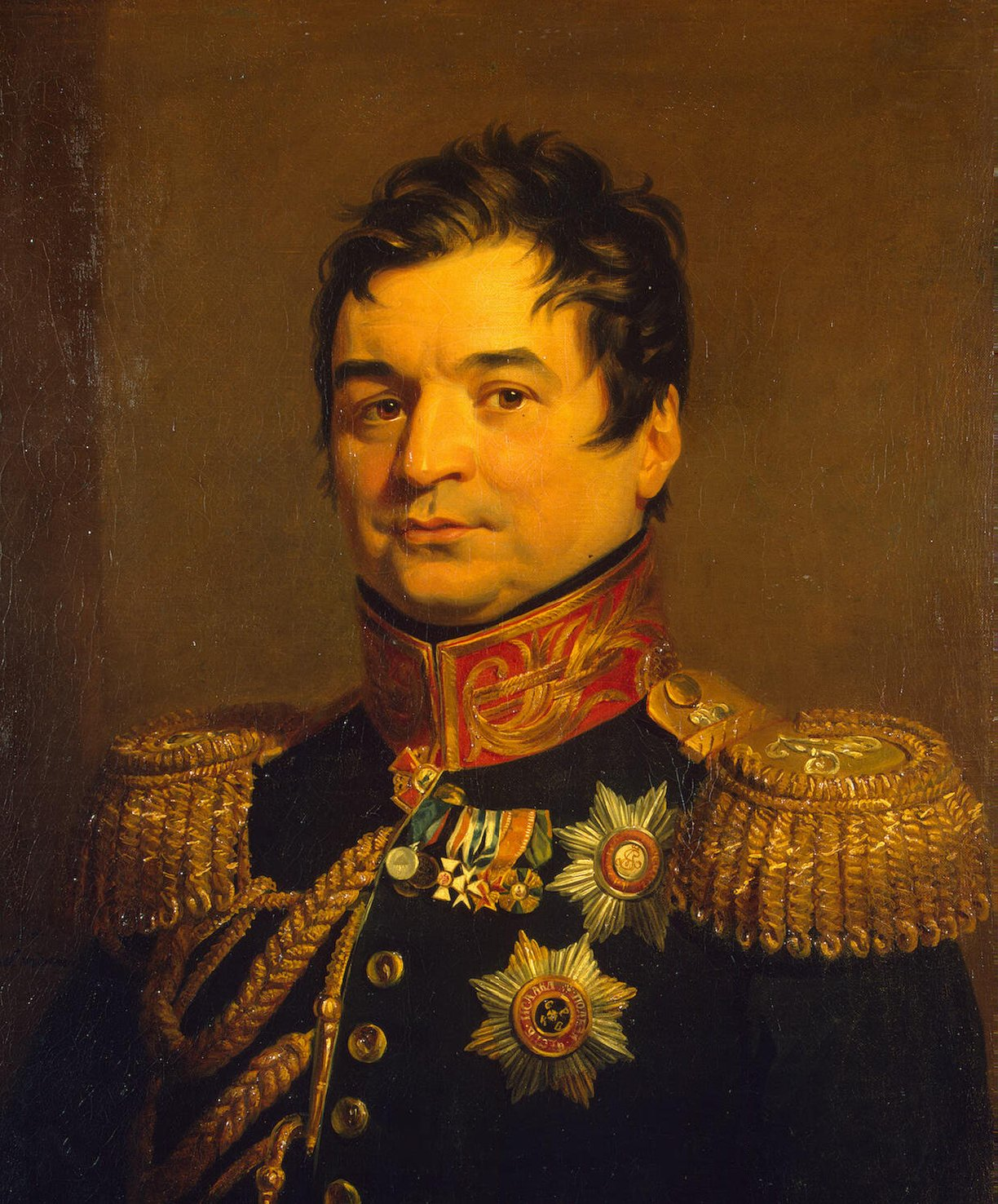
- Portrait by George Dawe from the Military Gallery of the Winter Palace, c. 1819–1822

Minister of Police of the Russian Empire
- In office 1810–1812
- Monarch: Alexander I
- Preceded by: Position established
- Succeeded by: Sergey Vyazmitinov

Governor General of Saint Petersburg
- In office 1809–1810
- Preceded by: Dmitry Lobanov-Rostovskiy
- Succeeded by: Sergey Vyazmitinov

Personal details
- Born: Alexander Dmitriyevich Balashov; 13 July 1770 Moscow, Russia
- Died: 8 May 1837 (aged 66)
- Education: Page Corps

Military service
- Allegiance: Russia
- Branch/service: Imperial Russian Army
- Rank: General of the Infantry
- Battles/wars: French Invasion of Russia

Alexander Dmitriyevich Balashov (Note: Sometimes spelled Aleksandr Dmitrievich Balashyov or Balashev (see also romanization of Russian).) (Russian: Алекса́ндр Дми́триевич Балашо́в; 13 July 1770 – 8 May 1837) was a Russian general and statesman.

== Biography ==
Balashov came from a noble family. When the boy turned 6 years, his father, a Privy Counsellor and Senator, had him enrolled in the Preobrazhensky Regiment though it was not until November 1781 that he entered the Page Corps, matriculating in 1787 with the rank of Kammer-page. On 9 January 1791 he joined the Izmaylovsky Regiment as lieutenant. From 1795 he was a lieutenant colonel in the regular army. He was promoted colonel in April 1798 and major general in 1799.

On 21 January 1800 Balashov was dismissed from the military service, but in November of the same year he was appointed governor general and chief of garrisons regiment in Tallinn. On 23 September 1804 he resigned for family reasons, but within three months he was appointed the chief of police in Moscow. In November 1807 he became the general-krigs-komissar, on 29 March 1808 he replaced Fyodor Ertell in the office of chief of police in Saint Petersburg and thereupon his career soared.

In February 1809 Alexander I conferred on Balashov the rank of adjutant general and appointed him the War Governor of Saint Petersburg. In March 1809 he was promoted to lieutenant-general. From 1 January 1810 he was a member of the newly established State Council. In June the same year he became the Minister of Police.

In 1812, during Napoleon's Invasion of Russia, Balashov was present in the front-line army stationed in Vilnius. After La Grande Armée crossed the frontier on June 12 (Julian Calendar), Balashov was dispatched to deliver the Emperor's letter to Napoleon. He participated in the organization of the People's Militia (Народное ополчение) and was a member of the extraordinary committee choosing the commander-in-chief of the Russian army.

After the Patriotic War of 1812 Balashov was involved in important diplomatic missions. Between 1819 and 1828, he served as the war governor general of Orel, Tula, Ryazan, Tambov and Voronezh. On 23 September 1834 Balashov resigned his office. He died on 8 May 1837 on his way to Kronstadt.

== Notes ==
Preceded by Dmitry Lobanov-Rostovskiy	War Governor of Saint Petersburg; 1809–1810	Succeeded by Sergey Vyazmitinov
Preceded by Position established	Minister of Police; 1810–1812	Succeeded by Sergey Vyazmitinov
