= Pyotr Aleksandrovich Tolstoy =

Russian general (1769–1844)

Count Pyotr Aleksandrovich Tolstoy
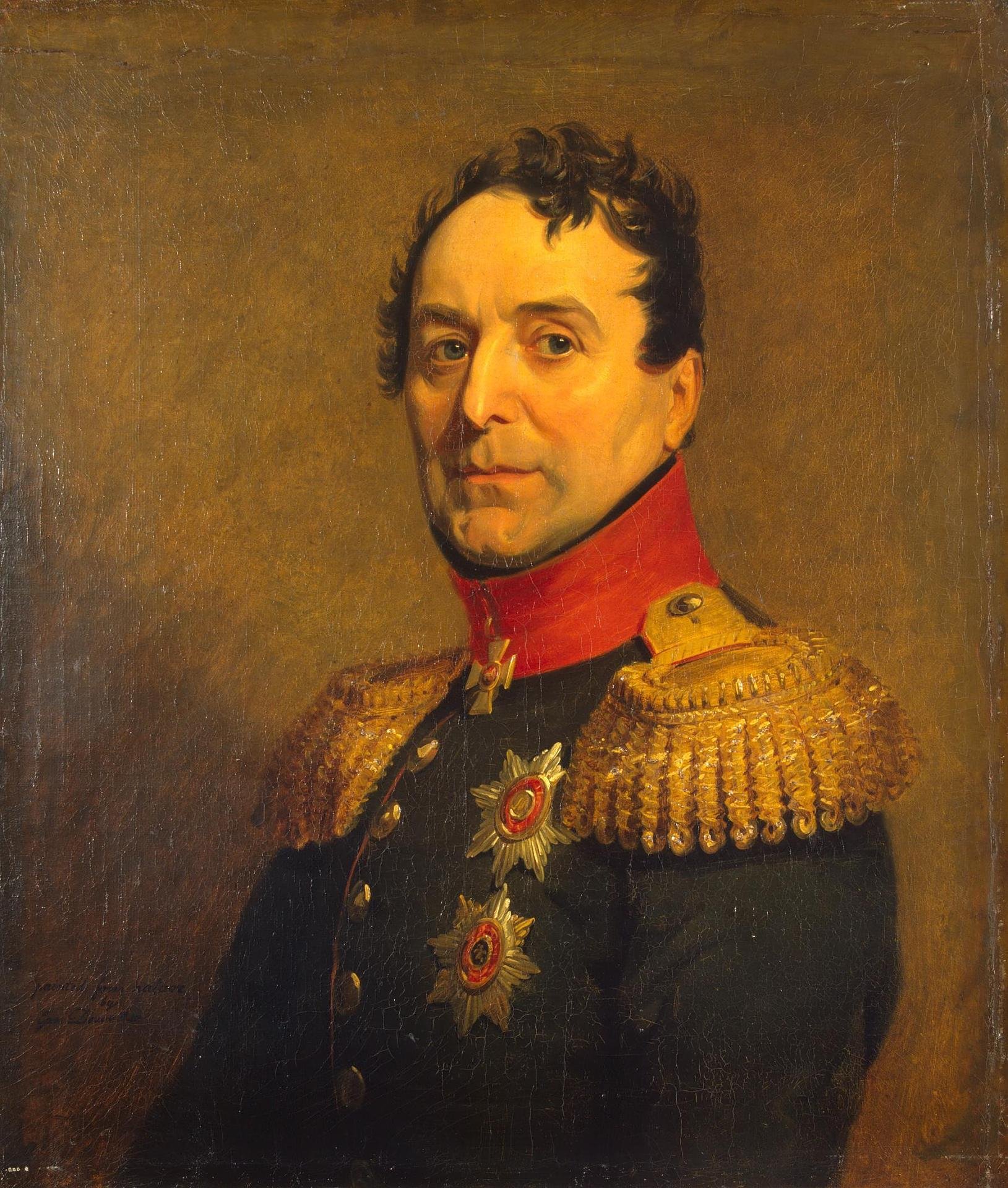
- Portrait by George Dawe
- Born: 1769
- Died: 28 September 1844 (aged 74–75); Moscow, Russia
- Burial place: Donskoy Monastery
- Military career
- Allegiance: Russia
- Service years: 1775–1839
- Rank: General of the Infantry
- Unit: Preobrazhensky Life Guards Regiment
- Commands: War Governorate of Saint Petersburg; Russian Corps of the Hanover Expedition; Preobrazhensky Life Guards Regiment
- Conflicts: Gustav III’s Russian War; Warsaw Insurrection; Kościuszko Uprising; Battle of Praga; French Revolutionary Wars; Napoleonic Wars; War of the Third Coalition; Hanover Expedition; War of the Fourth Coalition; War of the Sixth Coalition; Battle of Dresden
- Awards: Order of St. Andrew; Order of St. George; Order of St. Anna
- Other work: Member of the State Council

Count Pyotr Aleksandrovich Tolstoy (Note: In this name that follows East Slavic naming customs, the patronymic is Aleksandrovich and the family name is Tolstoy.) (Russian: Пётр Александрович Толстой; 1769 – 28 September 1844) was a Russian general and statesman who served in the French Revolutionary and Napoleonic Wars.

== Early career ==
Pyotr Tolstoy came from the Oryol branch of the Tolstoy family; his father, Alexander Tolstoy, was a grandson of Count Pyotr Andreyevich Tolstoy. In 1775 he was enrolled in the Leib Guard Preobrazhensky Regiment, and on 21 May 1785 elevated to aide-de-camp on the staff of Prince Nikolai Saltykov. In the same year he was promoted to lieutenant colonel. In 1788–1790 he participated in Gustav III's Russian War.

He served with distinction in the Warsaw Insurrection, and was subsequently promoted to colonel. On 24 October 1794 he commanded two battalions in the Battle of Praga. Upon his return, Empress Catherine II awarded Tolstoy the Order of St. George of the 3rd degree with her own hand and appointed him the chief of the Pskov Dragoon regiment. On 9 November 1797 he obtained the rank of major general with an appointment as chief of the Nizhny Novgorod Dragoon regiment, and in the next year received the Order of St. Anna of the 1st degree.

By the end of 1798 he was sent to Archduke Charles of Austria to establish communication with Alexander Suvorov. After the Campaigns of 1799 he was promoted to lieutenant general and became a member of the War Collegium and of the Governing Senate. In 1802 he was appointed war governor of Vyborg and in the next year of Saint Petersburg. At this post Tolstoy became famous for his generosity, giving out money to the poor and soldiers of guard regiments. During this time he also commanded the Preobrazhensky Regiment.

== Napoleonic Wars ==
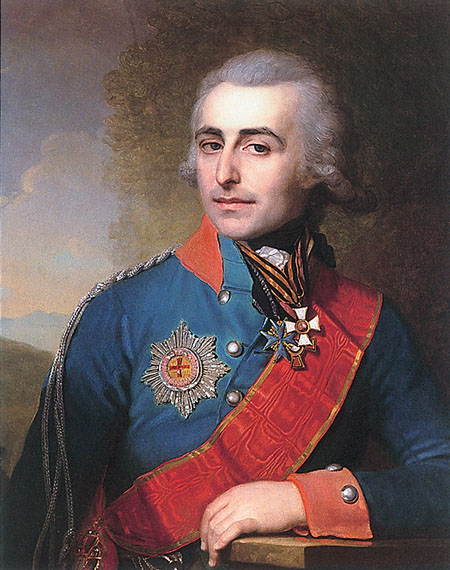
Portrait by Vladimir Borovikovsky, 1799

In September 1805 he departed with an expeditionary corps of 20,000 into Pomerania, to operate in Northern Germany under the general command of King Gustav IV Adolf of Sweden. He captured Hanover and returned to Russia after the battle of Austerlitz. In the beginning of the War of the Fourth Coalition, Emperor Alexander sent Tolstoy to reconcile Corps Commanders Bennigsen and Buxhoeveden, and to report on their quarrel directly to himself. After Bennigsen's appointment as a commander-in-chief, Tolstoy became the on-duty General of the latter.

From 14 October 1807 to 1 October 1808 he was the Russian ambassador in Paris. His main objective was to observe the Treaty of Tilsit, yet Tolstoy wrote to Alexander that all friendly assurances of Napoleon were mendacious. Tolstoy encouraged the Emperor not to believe them, but to prepare for the rebuff in advance, thereby predicting the forthcoming French invasion of Russia. He recommended to the Russian government a system of measures for the protection of the interests of Russia against possible aggression from Napoleon: to greatly increase the size of the army, to move it to the Western borders, to conclude a secret agreement with Austria, to finish the war with Turkey and Sweden, to conclude peace with the UK (see Anglo-Russian War), and to organize a new anti-French coalition with Prussia and Austria. Because of his lack of diplomatic experience, however, his efforts were useless, and after the Congress of Erfurt Tolstoy was recalled. Tolstoy nevertheless observed the worsening in the relations between Aleksander and Napoleon.

From 1809 to 1812 he lived in his estate near Tula. In 1812 he formed and then commanded the militia of the Nizhny Novgorod, Simbirsk, Kazan, Vyatka and Orenburg governorates. In 1813 he participated in the taking of Dresden and Magdeburg.

On 19 June 1814 he was promoted to full general, on 16 January 1816 appointed the chief of the 4th and then 5th Infantry Corps. From 30 August 1823 he was a member of the State Council. During the reign of Emperor Nicholas I he received the Order of St. Andrew and took a different military post.

From 1839 onwards he was in retirement. Pyotr Tolstoy died in Moscow on 28 September 1844 and was buried in the Donskoy Monastery.

Preceded by Mikhail Kamensky	War governor of Saint Petersburg; 1802–1805	Succeeded by Sergey Vyazmitinov

== External links and references ==
- (in Russian) Article in the Dictionary of the Russian generals
