= Arcadiy Harting =

Russian spy and security official (1861–after 1913)

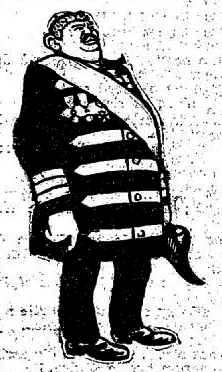
Caricature of Arcadiy Harting (source: L'Humanité, July 12, 1909)

Arкadiy Mikhailovich Harting (Russian: Аркадий Михайлович Гартинг; 29 October 1861 – after 1913) was a secret agent and officer of the Okhrana, the secret police of the Russian Empire. During his career spanning from 1879 to 1909, he served as a police informer, agent provocateur, officer and the Head of the Okhrana foreign service based in Paris. Born to a Jewish family, he was later baptised and at the end of his career was awarded the rank of Active State Councilor, which gave him the rights of nobility.

== Early life ==
Arkadiy Harting was born Aharon Hackelman (Russian: Ааарон Геккельман) on 29 October 1861 in Pinsk (now Belarus), to a Jewish family. In 1879, he became a student in Saint Petersburg.

== Career ==
=== Police informer in Russia ===
In Saint Petersburg, Hackelman joined the underground cell of the revolutionary terrorist organisation Narodnaya Volya and befriended many revolutionaries, including Vladimir Burtsev, a future counter-intelligence champion of the Russian revolutionaries. At about the same time, Hackelman was recruited by the Okhrana to spy on fellow revolutionaries. Information obtained from him led to a number of arrests, and some fellow revolutionaries became suspicious. According to the archive of the Paris Okhrana, he was defended by Burtsev, but Burtsev claims that he was prevented from raising his suspicions about Hackelman by other high-level revolutionaries. Hackelman then moved to Riga where he continued to spy on members of Narodnaya Volya, leading to further arrests. When suspicions about his involvement with the Okhrana intensified, he fled abroad.

=== Paris ===
Hackelman then settled in Switzerland and enrolled in ETH Zürich under the assumed name Landesen. Under this name he resumed his contacts with Russian revolutionaries who were preparing bombs to be sent to Russia. In 1885, he was recruited by the Okhrana's foreign service branch in Paris by its first head Peter Rachkovsky. Landesen first spied on revolutionaries in Switzerland despite persistent suspicions of cooperation with the police. In 1890 he moved to Paris and continued to spy on Russian revolutionaries based in France. The most high-profile operation of Landesen in Paris was an elaborate provocation to expose a number of revolutionary terrorists. He facilitated and financed a fake conspiracy to assassinate Russian Emperor Alexander III. To this end, a number of bombs were prepared and distributed among the conspirators. Rachkovsky then tipped off the Sûreté, the French secret police, and conspirators were arrested, but Landesen escaped. In a widely publicised trial of 1890, the conspirators were sentenced to prison terms or expelled from France. Landesen, considered the ring leader, was sentenced in absentia to five years in prison. This operation served not only the primary task of neutralising the radical revolutionaries, but also to show to the Russian government that France was no longer soft on subversives. This facilitated the Franco-Russian Alliance, which was Rachkovsky's major diplomatic goal.

=== Belgium and Germany ===
Hackelman then fled to Belgium, where he assumed a new name, Arkadiy Harting. Rachkovsky assigned Harting to a number of missions concerned with the security of visiting Russian dignitaries. For these assignments, he was decorated by Honours from Russia and a number of host countries. In 1892–1893 he was baptised and assumed the name Arkadiy Mikhailovich. In 1896 he officially changed his surname to Harding (Гартинг). He then married a Belgian, Magdalena Pirlot. In 1900, he was appointed head of the Okhrana's Berlin station, which initially operated as a branch of the Paris Okhrana under Rachkovsky, but more independently after 1902, when Rachkovsky was replaced by a new chief, Leonid Rataev. In Berlin, Harting organised a surveillance and penetration network similar to that operated by Rachkovsky in Paris. One of his agents was Jacob Zhitomirsky, who provided valuable information on the activities of the Russian Social Democratic Labour Party and its Bolshevik faction, including the inner circle of Russia's future communist leader, Vladimir Lenin. Zhitormirsky's information led to the arrest of Kamo by the German Police for his role in the 1907 Tiflis bank robbery. In 1904, during Russo-Japanese War, Harting was sent on an assignment to organise a surveillance of possible Japanese spies in the Baltic, in order to prevent disruptions to the navigation of Russian fleet to the Pacific in the lead up to the Battle of Tsushima.

=== Chief of the Paris Okhrana ===
After the assassination of Interior Minister Vyacheslav von Plehve and the escalation of revolutionary activity in 1905, Rachkovsky was brought back into the Okhrana as a deputy head of the Police Department, and soon after arranged to have Rataev replaced with Harting as chief of the Paris Okhrana. Under Harting, the Paris Okhrana reached the peak of its activity. Harting's operations were particularly effective against arms smuggling into Russia by revolutionary groups. Harting coordinated surveillance and penetration of these groups throughout Europe, and introduced a filing system with information about all persons mentioned in intelligence and operational reports. He coordinated a network of about 40 penetration agents and about 20 external surveillance agents.

== Exposure ==
In 1909, a former Okhrana officer Leonid Menshchikov, who defected to revolutionaries, identified Harting as the former Okhrana agent Hackelman and as Landesen, the organiser of the provocation for which he had been sentenced to a prison term by a French court. When Burtsev published this information, Harting was dismissed from his Okhrana post and fled to Belgium. The revelation caused a scandal in French Parliament, when Socialist deputy Jean Jaurès attacked the French government for hosting a foreign police service on French soil. In response, Prime Minister Georges Clemenceau promised that this would not be allowed to continue, although the branch continued to operate under a new chief, Alexandr Krasilnikov, though it never reached the level of activity achieved under Harting.

In 1913, Harting was awarded the rank of Active State Councilor, which gave him the rights of hereditary nobility. During World War I Harting was involved in counter-intelligence work in France and Belgium. His further whereabouts including the date of his death are unknown.
