= Ivan Velio =

Russian statesman (1830–1899)

Ivan Osipovich Velio
- Иван Осипович Велио
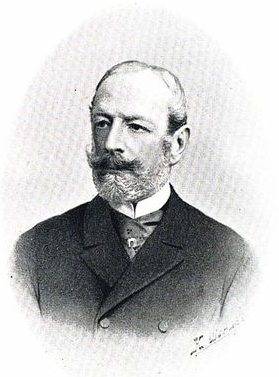

Director of the Police Department
- In office 17 August 1880 – 12 April 1881

Director of the Postal Department
- In office 21 June 1868 – 6 August 1880

Personal details
- Born: 18 October 1830 Tsarskoye Selo, Russian Empire
- Died: 11 February 1899 (aged 68)
- Spouse: Maria Reitern
- Parent: Osip Velio (father)
- Education: Alexander Lyceum
- Awards: Orders: Order of Saint Alexander Nevsky; Order of Saint Vladimir; Order of Saint Anna; Order of Saint Stanislaus; Legion of Honour; Order of the Red Eagle; Order of Albrecht; Order of the Dannebrog; Order of Leopold I; Order of the Medjidie

Baron Ivan Osipovich Velio (Russian: Иван Осипович Велио; 6 October 1830 – 30 January 1899) was a Russian statesman, Active Privy Councillor from 1 January 1891.

== Early life and education ==
Born in Tsarskoye Selo, the son of the Tsarskoye Selo Commandant of the Cavalry General Osip Velio from his marriage to Ekaterina Albrecht. Paternal grandson of the court banker Osip Velio, of Portuguese origin; on his mother was a descendant of Roman Bruce. From birth belonged to the Roman Catholic faith.

He was educated at the Imperial Alexander Lyceum.

== Career ==
Upon completion of the course, in 1847, he entered the service of the Ministry of Foreign Affairs and was the senior secretary at the missions in Dresden (since 1854) and Brussels (since 1858).

In the early 1860s, Velio returned to Russia and was soon appointed Kherson Vice–Governor (1861), then served as Bessarabian Governor (1862). In 1863, he was appointed Mayor of Odessa, and in 1865 – Governor of Simbirsk. He was elected an honorary citizen of Simbirsk.

At the end of 1866, Velio was appointed Director of the Executive Police Department, in 1868 – Director of the Postal Department. For 12 years of his management of this department, significant changes have been made in the postal business. Renewing the service staff, Velio first of all established a daily reception and delivery of correspondence instead of the previous two times a week. Home delivery of urban correspondence, which was practiced only in Saint Petersburg, Moscow, Warsaw and Kazan, was introduced in all places where post offices existed. Auxiliary zemstvo posts were formed; in the Central Asian possessions – post offices on the Russian model. In Eastern Siberia, a postal service was arranged along the Amur and Ussuri Rivers, to Vladivostok and the Novgorod Post, on the Pacific Ocean. From 1868 to 1874, the carriage of mail was opened on 35 railway lines. The dispatch of mail in the provincial cities of European Russia was established daily, and in some even twice a day. Agreements were established with shipping companies along the Volga, Kama, Oka, Neman, Dnieper, Sheksna and other rivers. Detailed postal indexes and manuals were compiled; open letters, registered and valuable packages have been introduced.

In 1874, Velio, as a Russian representative, traveled to Bern for the first Universal Postal Congress, at which Russia joined the Universal Postal Union. In order to better organize the postal business, Velio personally visited the most remote points of the empire, for example, Turkestan and the Amur Region. In 1880, Velio was placed at the head of the newly formed Police Department, in 1881, he was appointed a senator, and on May 14, 1896, a member of the Council of State.

== Death ==
He died in 1899 and was buried in Saint Petersburg, possibly in the family vault at the Smolensk Evangelical Cemetery. According to Alexander Polovtsov, Baron Velio "was always impeccably honest, sought to introduce better practices and pursued abuses while managing the postal department; he was reproached only for a certain rudeness of forms in dealing with subordinates". The name Veillot is repeatedly found in the letters and poems of Alexey Tolstoy; the poet resented him for perusing correspondence and ridiculed him for the poor work of the post office.

== Family ==
Wife – Maria Reitern (1851 – April 25, 1918, Petrograd), was her husband's maternal cousin niece; daughter of Lieutenant General Magnus Reitern. Married had children:

- Vladimir (1877–1961), major general, member of the White movement as part of the Northwestern Army. In exile in Belgium, since 1954, in the United States of America. Died in New York;
- Elena (1874–?);
- Maria (1875 – after 1930), maid of honor to Empresses Maria Feodorovna and Alexandra Feodorovna. After the revolution, she remained in Russia. Died in exile.
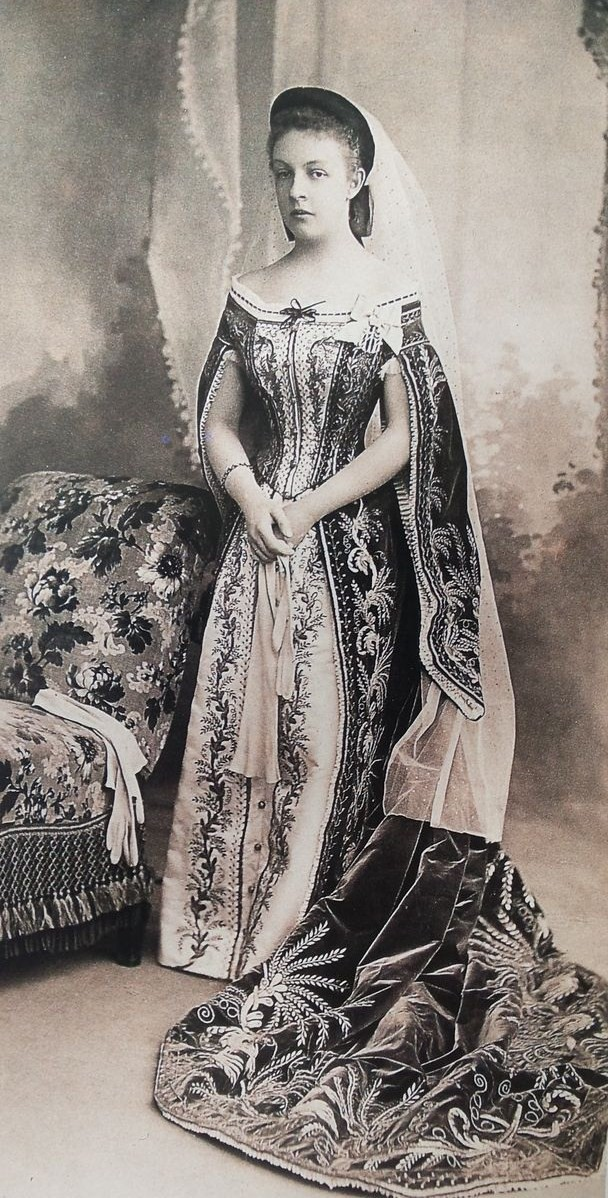
Maria Ivanovna Velio in Court Dress (1894)

== Awards ==
- Order of Saint Stanislaus, 2nd Class (August 1856);
- Dark Bronze Medal "In Memory of the War of 1853–1856" (1856);
- Order of Saint Anna, 2nd Class (April 1858);
- Imperial Crown to the Order of Saint Anna, 2nd Class (December 1859);
- Order of Saint Vladimir, 3rd Class (August 30, 1861);
- Order of Saint Stanislaus, 1st Class (April 4, 1865);
- Order of Saint Vladimir, 2nd Class;
- Order of Saint Alexander Nevsky With Diamond Signs (1897);
- Saxon Order of Albrecht, Commander (April 1858);
- Belgian Order of Leopold I, Commander (November 1861);
- Turkish Order of the Medjidie, 2nd Class (March 19, 1864);
- French Order of the Legion of Honour, Grand Officer's Cross (1878);
- Prussian Order of the Red Eagle, 1st Class with Diamond Insignia;
- Danish Order of the Dannebrog, Grand Cross.

== Remembrance ==
- In 2010, the Ministry of Communications of Russia issued an artistic stamped envelope "Ulyanovsk Region. Ivan Osipovich von Velio (1830–1899), Director of the Russian Postal Department from 1868 to 1880".

== Sources ==
- Velio, Ivan Osipovich // Encyclopedic Dictionary of Brockhaus and Efron: In 86 Volumes (82 Volumes and 4 Additional Ones) – Saint Petersburg, 1890–1907
- Almanac of Modern Russian Statesmen – Saint Petersburg: Isidor Goldberg Printing House, 1897 – Pages 124–125
- Alexander Kolpakidi, Alexander Sever (2010). Special Services of the Russian Empire. Encyclopedia of Special Services. Moscow: Yauza Express Moscow. pp. 172–176. ISBN 978-5-699-43615-6.
- Ivan Sivopyas. Simbirsk Governor and Russian Postman Baron Ivan Osipovich Velio
