= Roman Malinovsky =

Russian politician (1876–1918)

- Роман Малиновский
- Malinovsky in 1913

Member of the State Duma
- In office November 1912 – May 1914

Personal details
- Born: March 18, 1876 Warsaw, Warsaw Governorate, Russian Empire
- Died: November 5, 1918 (aged 42) Moscow, Russian Soviet Federative Socialist Republic
- Party: Russian Social Democratic Labour Party (1906-)
- Military Service
- Allegiance: Russian Empire
- Branch: Russian Imperial Army
- Service years: 1902-1905
- Unit: Izmaylovsky Regiment
- Conflicts: Russo-Japanese War

Roman Vatslavovich Malinovsky (Russian: Роман Вацлавович Малиновский; Polish: Roman Malinowski; 18 March 1876 – 5 November 1918) was a prominent Bolshevik politician before the Russian Revolution, while at the same time working as the best-paid agent for the Okhrana, the Tsarist secret police. They codenamed him 'Portnoi' (the tailor).

== Biography ==
=== Early life ===
Born in Plotsk province, Poland (at the time part of the Russian Empire), Malinovsky lost his parents – ethnic Polish peasants – while still a child. He was jailed for several robberies from 1894 to 1899, spending three years in prison; he was also charged with attempted rape. In 1902 he enlisted in the prestigious Izmaylovsky Regiment by impersonating a cousin with the same name. Malinovsky began his activity as an Okhrana agent while serving in the ranks of the regiment, reporting on fellow-soldiers and on officers. Discharged from the Imperial Russian Army in 1905 at the end of the Russo-Japanese War (the Ismailovsky Regiment did not fight in the Russo-Japanese War of 1905 to 1905.), he relocated to Saint Petersburg.

== Political career and secret police work ==
In 1906, he found a job as a lathe operator and joined the Petersburg Metalworkers' Union and the Russian Social Democratic Labour Party (RSDLP). Initially, he was inclined to support the Mensheviks, who believed in trade union autonomy, rather than the Bolshevik faction, who sought to control the union. He was arrested five times as a union activist, but his Okhrana handlers arranged each time for him to be released without arousing suspicion.

Exiled from St Petersburg in 1910, he moved to Moscow. Here, for the first time, he was awarded a regular salary as a police informer, to supplement his wages as a metal turner, and was instructed by the Okhrana Director S. P. Beletsky to ensure that the different factions of the RSDLP never reunited. Malinovsky, therefore, joined the Bolsheviks. In January 1912, he travelled to Prague, where Vladimir Lenin had organised a conference to finalise the break with the Mensheviks and create a separate Bolshevik organisation. He made such a good impression on Lenin that he was elected to the Central Committee, and chosen to represent the Bolsheviks in the forthcoming elections to the Fourth Duma, to which he was elected as its most prominent working-class deputy, in November 1912.

He was simultaneously the Okhrana's best-paid agent, earning 8,000 rubles a year, 1,000 more than the Director of the Imperial Police. He led the six-member Bolshevik group (two of whom were Okhrana agents) and was deputy chairman of the Social Democrats in the Duma. As a secret agent, he helped send several important Bolsheviks (like Sergo Ordzhonikidze, Joseph Stalin, and Yakov Sverdlov) into Siberian exile.

In November 1912, he visited Lenin in Kraków and was urged not to unite with the Mensheviks. Malinovsky ignored that by reading a conciliatory speech in the Duma, to throw any suspicion off of himself. On 28 December 1912, he attended a Central Committee meeting in Vienna. He persuaded Lenin to appoint an Okhrana agent, Miron Chernomazov, as editor of Pravda as opposed to Stalin's candidate Stepan Shahumyan. The tsarist regime was determined to keep the RSDLP split, meaning that conciliators and pro-party groups were targeted for sabotage, while liquidators and recallists were encouraged.

When Menshevik leader Julius Martov first denounced Malinovsky as a spy in January 1913, Lenin refused to believe him and stood by Malinovsky. The accusing article was signed Ts, short for Tsederbaum, Martov's real name. Stalin threatened Martov's sister and brother-in-law, Lydia and Fedor Dan, by saying they would regret it if the Mensheviks denounced Malinovsky.

Malinovsky's efforts helped the Okhrana arrest Sergo Ordzhonikidze (14 April 1912), Yakov Sverdlov (10 February 1913) and Stalin (23 February 1913). The latter was arrested at a Bolshevik fundraising ball, which Malinovsky had persuaded him to attend by lending him a suit and silk cravat. Malinovsky was talking to Stalin when detectives took him and even shouting he would free him.

In July 1913, he betrayed a plan for Sverdlov and Stalin to escape, warning the police chief in Turukhansk. He was then the only Bolshevik leader not in foreign or Siberian exile. Soon after this foiled escape plan, Stalin came over to Martov's view and strongly suspected Malinovsky to be an Okhrana spy, which was confirmed to be correct years later, fuelling Stalin's future distrust of his comrades.

On 8 May 1914, he was forced to resign from the Duma after Russia's recently promoted Deputy Minister for the Interior, General Vladimir Dzhunkovsky, decided that having a police agent in such a prominent position might cause a scandal. He was given a pay off of 6,000 roubles, and ordered to leave the country. He joined Lenin in Kraków, where a Bolshevik commission looked into rumours that he was a police spy. Despite testimony from Nikolai Bukharin and Elena Troyanovskaya, who both suspected that they had been betrayed to the police by Malinovsky when they were arrested in Moscow, respectively in 1910 and 1912, the commission accepted Malinovsky's story that he had been forced to resign when the police had blackmailed him by threatening to publicise the old charge of attempted rape.

When World War I broke out, he was interned in a POW camp by the Germans.

=== Trial and execution ===
Following the February Revolution of 1917 which overthrew the tsarist regime, secret police offices in Moscow and Petrograd (St. Petersburg) were raided by revolutionary crowds and documents began to be assembled identifying agents provocateur and informants. No documents were found upon which to make a case against Malinovsky, however, although in the environment of discovery and retribution, the drumbeat against Malinovsky again began to be heard, with organs of the Menshevik press particularly adament that there was truth to the long-running rumors, with a 5-part series on "The Malinovsky Affair" running in Rabochaia gazeta.

Malinovsky, still an inmate of a German prisoner-of-war camp, sought to return to Russia to clear his name. With the Bolsheviks in power after the October Revolution of 1917 that overthrew the Russian Provisional Government and the democratically-elected Russian Constituent Assembly, Malinovsky was released from captivity following the signing of the Treaty of Brest-Litovsk in March 1918 and made an appeal for a new hearing directly to Lenin, who had until fairly recently continued to believe in Malinovsky's innocence.

Malinovsky returned to Petrograd in October 1918, surrendering at the Smolny Institute on the 23rd of that month. He was subsequently transferred to Moscow, where he underwent 9 days of interrogation.

His trial was held on November 5, 1918, before the High Revolutionary Tribunal of the All-Russian Central Executive Committee of Soviets (VTsIK), with Nikolai Krylenko, a former employee of Malinovsky until his arrest in December 1913, one of the team of prosecutors. Malinovsky's sole defense was a six-hour speech in his own behalf in which he did not deny the charges against him, but claimed that police blackmail was the reason for his duplicity and argued that little actual damage was done by the information he provided.

Malinovsky expressed repentance for his activity, while stating that he expected to receive the death penalty for his crimes. He was convicted, sentenced to death, and executed that same day.

== See also ==
- Outline of the Russian Revolution and Civil War
- Bibliography of the Russian Revolution and Civil War
- Bibliography of Stalinism and the Soviet Union
- Index of Old Bolsheviks
- Index of articles related to the Russian Revolution and Civil War
- Yevno Azef
- Operation Trust

== Sources ==
- Brackman, Roman (2004). The Secret File of Joseph Stalin: A Hidden Life. Routledge. ISBN 978-1-135-75840-0.
- Montefiore, Simon Sebag (2007), Young Stalin, Weidenfeld & Nicolson, ISBN 978-0-297-85068-7
- Radzinsky, Edvard (1997), Stalin: The First In-depth Biography Based on Explosive New Documents from Russia's Secret Archives, Anchor, ISBN 978-0-385-47954-7
