= Pyotr Rachkovsky =

Russian secret service chief (1851–1910)

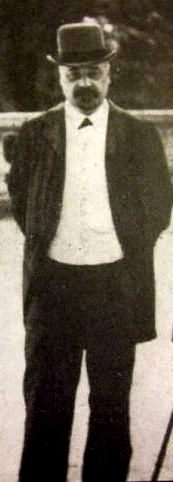
- Born: 1853; Dubăsari, Kherson Governorate, Russian Empire
- Died: 1 November 1910 (aged 56–57)

Pyotr Ivanovich Rachkovsky (Russian: Пётр Иванович Рачковский; 1853 – 1 November 1910) was chief of the Okhrana, the secret police of the Russian Empire. He was based in Paris from 1885 to 1902.

== Activities in 1880s–1890s ==
After the assassination of Alexander II of Russia in 1881, the government moved against various revolutionary factions operated by émigrées or hiding out in Russia. Rachkovsky's principal mission was to compromise Russia's growing revolutionary movement. The list of penetration agents hired by Rachkovsky included:

- Landesen (Abraham Hackelman), among the Narodnaya Volya terrorists in France and Switzerland
- Ignaty Kornfeld, among the anarcho-communists
- Prodeus, a well-known revolutionary, reporting on various revolutionary centers
- Ilya Drezhner, among the social democrats in Germany, Switzerland and France
- Boleslaw Malankiewicz, among the Polish anarchists and terrorists in London
- Casimir Pilenas, a spotter for Scotland Yard recruited to work among the Latvian terrorists
- Zinaida Zhuchenko, among the socialist revolutionaries and their terrorist fighting unit
- Aleksandr Evalenko, assigned to New York City for work among the Jewish Bundists and terrorists

According to journalist Brian Doherty:

"Rachkovsky started as a possibly sincere, possibly duplicitous mover in St. Petersburg's radical underground in the late 1870s, after having been dismissed (for leniency toward political exiles) from a job as a prosecutor for the czar's government. He ended up running the show for the Okhrana, the Russian secret police, in Paris, where so many radicals considered dangerous to the czarist regime had immigrated. From 1885 until 1902, Rachkovsky was responsible for keeping anarchists under surveillance and on the run—and also, in many cases, financed and supplied with ideas... "[P]rominent among his early initiatives were provocations designed to lure credulous émigrés into the most heinous crimes of which they may never have otherwise conceived". Rachkovsky's aim was to entrap his targets into committing acts that would help ensure that his job seemed of vital importance to the czar. This guaranteed him a solid berth in Paris that was lucrative both in salary and prestige [and] in opportunities for corrupt under-the-radar dealings with a French government doing heavy business with Russia."

By personally winning the goodwill and cooperation of the services of host countries, Rachkovsky indirectly assisted his agents and crowned their efforts. For instance, when a penetration agent in Geneva had supplied the essential information about a gathering of terrorists there and external agents had located by surveillance their clandestine printshop and weapons store, Rachkovsky could call on Swiss security units to help destroy the underground and arrest the ringleaders. This happened in 1887; it was repeated in 1888, then again and again in other countries. His powers of persuasion were sufficient to recruit Lev Tikhomirov, one of the leading terrorists, when he had been softened by contrived exposure, and get him to write an anti-revolutionary book.

Rachkovsky's political action operations, often highly successful, were exclusively his personal effort. He devised some plans for using others, but in every major instance, he was the sole operator. He befriended a Danish journalist, Jules Hansen, during his first visit to Paris in 1884. Besides being one of the bright lights of his profession, Hansen was a counselor in the French Ministry of Foreign Affairs and a friend of Minister Théophile Delcassé. He became the principal channel for promoting a friendly press for Russia in western Europe, and he made contacts for Rachkovsky with leading ministers and politicians, including even President Émile Loubet. On the other hand, Rachkovsky also cultivated important personages in the imperial government and at court. In these activities, he was, as revolutionary writers accused him of being, a manipulator behind the scenes preparing the ground for acceptance, both in Paris and at Saint Petersburg, of the Franco-Russian Alliance signed in 1893.

Rachkovsky devised and developed access to several other governments besides the French. The files contain copies of dispatches about an audience he had with Pope Leo XIII and a proposed exchange of diplomats between Russia and the Vatican with a particular view to the unrest in Catholic Poland. Advisers to the Tsar in Saint Petersburg turned down the proposal, but the idea of combating the insurrectional campaign in Poland by using religious interests clearly illustrates Rachkovsky's high-level concept of political action.

Rachkovsky's major provocation operation was primarily in support of political action. In 1890, Arcadiy Harting, having promoted among the revolutionaries in Paris an elaborate plot to kill the Tsar, arranged that after one underground meeting a large number of the terrorists would each have on their persons their weapons and written notes on the parts they were to play. The French police, tipped off through cutouts by Rachkovsky, arrested the entire group, and that summer they were tried and sentenced, Landesen in absentia. Rachkovsky thus scored a victory not only over the enemies of the state but against those in Saint Petersburg who had opposed the Franco-Russian Alliance on the grounds that France was too soft on subversives. The stern police and court action proved to Saint Petersburg that France too had a strong government capable of dealing with internal enemies.

Rachkovsky may have also played a role in amplifying the carnage of World War I: "Rachkovsky's bosses in Russia and his hosts in Paris both feared the radicals, allowing the Russian agent to tighten the ties between the two nations. He succeeded so well that historian Alex Butterworth argues he was partly to blame for the Franco-Russian Alliance that helped make World War I such a bloody mess."

== Role in the creation of the Protocols of the Elders of Zion ==
These faction fights provide the backdrop to the infamous The Protocols of the Elders of Zion. Many authors maintain that it was Rachkovsky's agent in Paris, Matvei Golovinski, who authored the first edition in the early 1900s. The text presented the impending Russian Revolution of 1905 as a part of a powerful global Jewish conspiracy and fomented anti-Semitism to deflect public attention from Russia's growing social problems. Another agent of Rachkovsky, Yuliana Glinka, is often cited as the person who sent the forgery from France to Russia via her uncle General Pyotr Vasilyevich Orzhevsky.

== Career after 1905 ==
After the Revolution of 1905, martial law was introduced in Saint Petersburg. Rachkovsky was brought back to head the entire Okhrana, first as MVD Special Commissioner and then as the deputy director of Police.

Rachkovsky had the reputation of being an unrivaled master of intrigues and provocation. In 1902, he faked a letter by the leader of the Russian social democrats Georgy Plekhanov that accused Narodnaya Volya leaders of cooperation with the British Intelligence Service. This allowed the police to exploit mutual distrust and recrimination between the factions.

== In popular culture ==
He was portrayed in "The Appointment", the eighth episode of the 1974 BBC production Fall of Eagles, by Michael Bryant, who played Vladimir Lenin in Nicholas and Alexandra. He appears in the novel The Prague Cemetery and is mentioned in Foucault's Pendulum. He is also a character in Will Thomas's detective novel, Dance with Death.
