= Osip Velio =

Osip Osipovich Velio
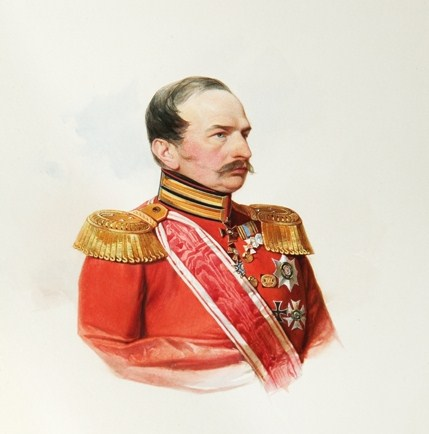
- Watercolor by Vladimir Gau, 1847
- Born: February 4, 1795
- Died: August 28, 1867 (aged 72); Sankt–Peterburg, Russian Empire
- Military career
- Allegiance: Russian Empire
- Branch: Cavalry
- Rank: General of Cavalry
- Conflicts: Foreign Campaigns of 1813 and 1814; Russo–Turkish War of 1828–1829
- Awards: List: Order of Saint Anna, 3rd Class (1813); Kulm Cross (1813); Order of Saint Vladimir, 4th Class (1814); Order of Saint Anna, 2nd Class (1831); Order of Saint Georgiy, 4th Class (1834); Order of Saint Vladimir, 3rd Class (1838); Order of Saint Stanislav, 1st Class (1842); Order of Saint Anna, 1st Class (1848); Order of Saint Vladimir, 2nd Class (1856); Order of the White Eagle (1860); Order of Saint Aleksandr Nevskiy (1867)

Baron Osip Osipovich Velio (1795–1867) was a cavalry general in the Russian Imperial Army, commandant of Narva and Tsarskoe Selo, and memoirist.

== Biography ==
Osip Velio was born in Peterburg on January 24, 1795, in the family of a court banker of Portuguese origin, Baron Iosif Velo (1755–1802) and Sofya Severina (1770–1839), the daughter of a Hamburg merchant.

He received his education at the Main German School (Petrishule), where he studied from 1807 to 1812. In 1804, Osip Velio was enrolled as a clerk in the Expedition of State Revenues, where he was listed as "on leave until completion of studies".

On February 26, 1813, he entered military service as a second lieutenant in the Kazan Dragoon Regiment and took part in the Campaign of the Russian Army in Prussia and France. On July 6, he was assigned to the Life Guards Cavalry Regiment, and on September 28, 1813, he was transferred to this regiment as a cornet.

For his distinction at Kulm, he was awarded the Order of Saint Anna, 3rd Degree, and a special Prussian Badge of the Order of the Iron Cross. He then fought in the battles of Leipzig and Brienne. For his participation in the Defeat of the French Guard at Fère–Champenoise, he received the Order of Saint Vladimir, 4th Degree With a Bow. After this battle, he was appointed adjutant to General Andreevskiy and ended his participation in the war against Napoleon by Storming the Montmartre Heights near Paris.

On October 13, 1814, he returned to the regiment and in 1822 was promoted to captain, and on July 25, 1825, he received the rank of colonel, commanding the 2nd Squadron in the regiment.

During the Dekabrists' Uprising, Velio attacked the rebels with his squadron and was wounded in the right arm above the elbow; doctors were unable to cure this arm and were forced to amputate it. On December 15, 1825, he was appointed aide–de–camp. From January 11, 1826, he was a parade ground major of Tsarskoe Selo.

During the Russo–Turkish War of 1828–1829, Velio was in the army operating on the Dunay, took part in several battles and was the commandant of the captured fortresses of Isaccea and Tulcea.

On June 25, 1833, Velio was promoted to Major General of the Retinue of His Imperial Majesty and on October 6 of the same year he was again enlisted in the Life Guards Cavalry Regiment. From 1834, he held the post of commandant of the Narva Fortress. On March 17, 1845, he was promoted to Lieutenant General and on May 2 of the following year, he was appointed commandant of Tsarskoe Selo. On March 25, 1862, he received the rank of general of cavalry.

He was awarded the title of general serving with His Majesty's Person.

He died on August 16, 1867, and was removed from the lists on August 27. He was buried in Sankt–Peterburg at the Smolenka Lutheran Cemetery.

== Family ==
Wife – Ekaterina Albrekht (1795–1884), daughter of Colonel of the Life Guards Semyonovskoe Regiment Ivan Albrekht and sister of Karl Albrekht. According to a contemporary, Baroness Velio "was not beautiful, but she was so smart and pleasant in her dealings that her appearance was completely forgotten. She, poor thing, often had to blush when her grumpy, unfriendly and one–armed husband sent guests out of the house at a certain hour, even if they were invited. He demanded that his wife turn off all the lights in the house by half past ten and so impolitely drove out his guests that he took away any desire from them to visit his house". In 1838, Ekaterina Ivanovna bought the Gomontovo Estate from her brother, which was considered one of the best in the Petergof District. They had three children in the marriage:

- Nikolay Osipovich (1827–1865), collegiate councilor, married (since June 2, 1854) to Aleksandra Essen;
- Ivan Osipovich (1830–1899), actual privy councilor, senator and member of the State Council of the Russian Empire;
- Elminiya (Germiniya) Osipovna (1835–1917), maid of honor, translator and memoirist. Since 1863 she was married to General Ivan Lishin (1835–1893), the son of Andrey Lishin.

== Awards ==
Among other awards, Velio received the following orders:

- Order of Saint Anna, 3rd Class (1813);
- Kulm Cross (1813);
- Order of Saint Vladimir, 4th Class with Bow (1814);
- Order of Saint Anna, 2nd Class (1831);
- Order of Saint Georgiy, 4th Class (December 3, 1834, for impeccable service for 25 years in officer ranks, No. 4934 on the Grigorovich–Stepanov List of Knights);
- Order of Saint Vladimir, 3rd Class (1838);
- Order of Saint Stanislav, 1st Class (1842);
- Order of Saint Anna, 1st Class (1848, the imperial crown was granted to this order in 1850);
- Order of Saint Vladimir, 2nd Class with Swords (1856);
- Order White Eagle (1860);
- Order of Saint Aleksandr Nevskiy (April 23, 1867).

== Sources ==
- Sergey Volkov. Generals of the Russian Empire. Encyclopedic Dictionary of Generals and Admirals from Pyotr I to Nikolay II – Volume I. A–K – Moskva, 2009
- Yearbook of the Russian Army for 1869 – Sankt–Peterburg, 1869
- Complete List of Chiefs, Commanders and Officers of the Life Guards Horse Regiment from 1731 to 1886 – Sankt–Peterburg, 1886
- Vladimir Ponomaryov, Valeriy Shabanov. Knights of the Imperial Order of Saint Aleksandr Nevskiy, 1725–1917: Bio–Bibliographical Dictionary in Three Volumes – Volume 2 – Moskva, 2009
- List of Generals by Seniority. Corrected as of June 20 – Sankt–Peterburg, 1840
- List of Generals by Seniority. Corrected as of January 1 – Sankt–Peterburg, 1867
- Vasiliy Stepanov, Nikolay Grigorovich. In Memory of the Centenary of the Imperial Military Order of the Holy Great Martyr and Victorious Georgiy (1769–1869) – Sankt–Peterburg, 1869
- Valeriy Fedorchenko. The Retinue of Russian Emperors – Book 1. A–L – Moskva–Krasnoyarsk, 2005
- Denis Shilov, Yuriy Kuzmin. Members of the State Council of the Russian Empire. 1801–1906: Biographical Reference – Sankt–Peterburg, 2007
- Amburger Archive: Velio, Osip Osipovich
- Central State Historical Archive of Sankt–Peterburg. Collection 272. Inventory 1. File 16
