= Police Department of Russia =

Agency leading the police in the Russian Empire

Police Department of the Russian Empire
- Департамент полиции Российской империи (Departament politsii Rossiyskoy imperii)

Agency overview
- Formed: November 14, 1819 (Department of the Executive Police); August 6, 1880 (Police Department)
- Dissolved: February 27, 1917
- Jurisdiction: Russian Empire
- Headquarters: Petrograd
- Parent agency: Ministry of the Interior of the Russian Empire
- Child agency: Police of Russia

The Police Department of the Russian Empire (Russian: Департамент полиции Российской империи) was the government agency responsible for the overall management and coordination of police forces in the Russian Empire, including the Okhrana branches and the Special Corps of Gendarmes, between 1880 and the fall of the Empire in the Russian Revolution in 1917.

== History ==
On November 14, 1819, the Department of the Executive Police (Russian: Департамент полиции исполнительной) was created within the Ministry of Internal Affairs, following the dissolution of the Ministry of Police. The task of the new department was the overall management and coordination of the various police forces in the Empire.

In 1826, the handling of political, religious and espionage cases was brought under the Third Section of His Imperial Majesty's Own Chancellery, with the Department of Executive Police remaining in control of regular police and crime-fighting.

The Police Department in its final incarnation was established on August 6, 1880 following the dissolution of both the Third Section and the Department of the Executive Police. The newly formed department was again placed under the Ministry of Internal Affairs. From 1880 til 1883 it was called Department of the State Police ("Департамент государственной полиции" (Departament gosudarstvennoy politsii)). Under its jurisdiction and oversight were the Okhrana, all the police forces, including the detective branches, and the Fire departments.

After the February Revolution the Department was dissolved by the decree of the Russian provisional government on February 27, 1917, and following the October Revolution the Bolshevik government announced the establishment of the Militsiya, as the new police force.

== Director ==
The head of the department was The Director of the Police Department, who was appointed by the Minister of the Internal Affairs.

Directors of Police Department
Minister	Start year	End year
Ivan Velio	1880	1881
Vyacheslav von Plehve	1881	1884
Pyotr Durnovo	1884	1893
Nikolai Petrov	1893	1895
Nikolai Saburov	1895	1896
Anton Dobrzhinsky	1896	1897
Sergei Zvolyansky	1897	1902
Aleksei Lopukhin	1902	1905
Sergei Kovalensky	March 1905	June 1905
Nikolai Garin	July 1905	November 1905
Emmanuel Vuich	1905	1906
Maximilian Trusevich	1906	1909
Nil Zuev	1909	1912
Stepan Beletsky	1912	1914
Valentine Brun de Saint Hippolyte	1914	1915
Ruschu Mollov	September 1915	November 1915
Konstantin Kafafov	1915	1916
Evgeny Klimovich	February 1916	September 1916
Aleksey Vasilyev	1916	1917

== See also ==
- Ministry of Police of Imperial Russia
- Okhrana
