= Saint Petersburg Governorate =

1708–1927 unit of Russia

Coordinates: 59.9500°N 30.3167°E

Saint Petersburg Governorate Санкт-Петербургская губерния
- Governorate
- Coat of arms

- Location in the Russian Empire
- Country: Russian Empire
- Established: 1708
- Abolished: 1927
- Capital: Shlisselburg (until 1712); Saint Petersburg (from 1712)

Area
  - Total: 44,613 km^{2} (17,225 sq mi)

Population (1897)
  - Total: 2,112,033
  - Density: 47.341/km^{2} (122.61/sq mi)
  - Urban: 67.32%
  - Rural: 32.68%

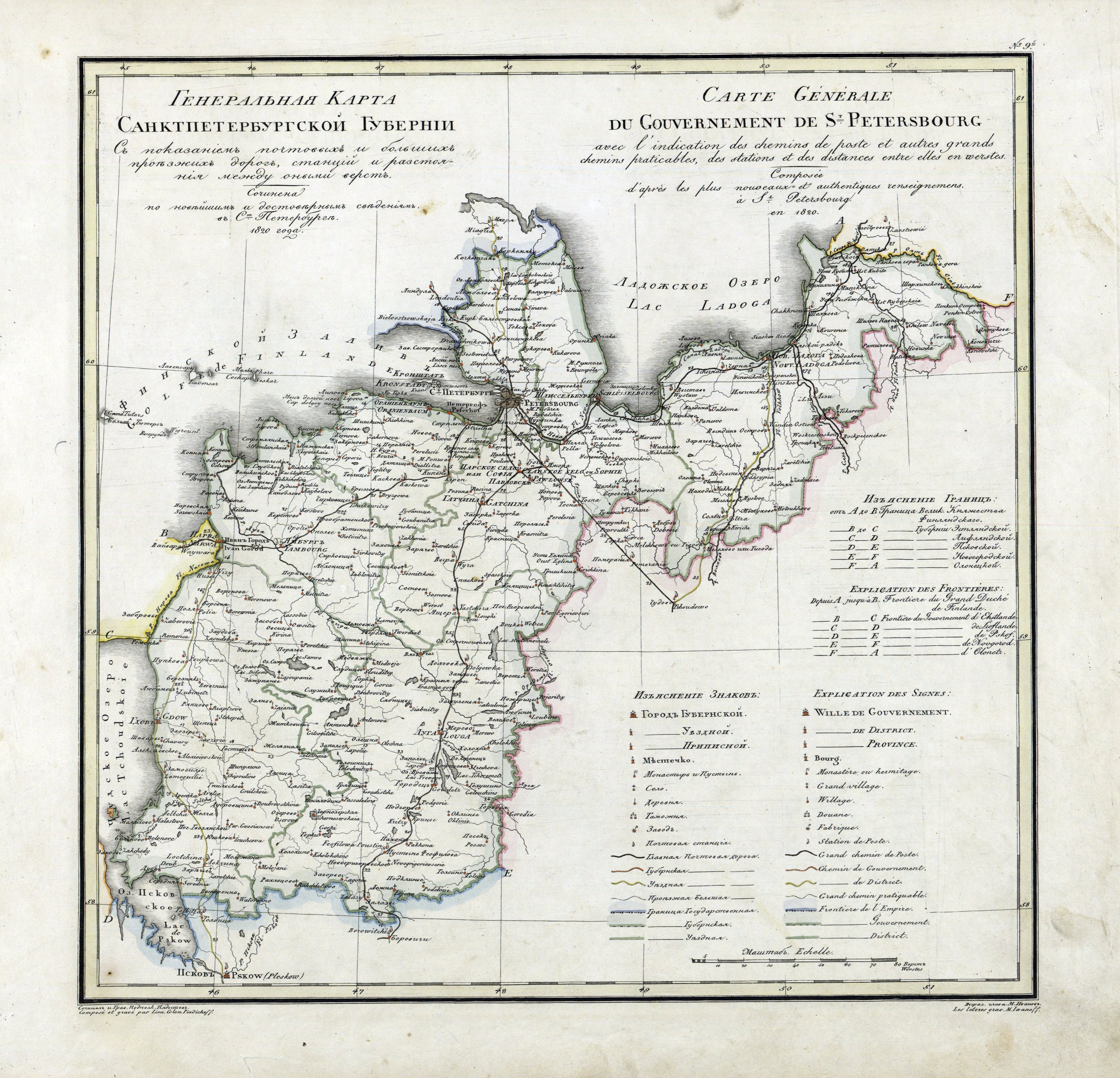
Saint-Petersburg Governorate 1820

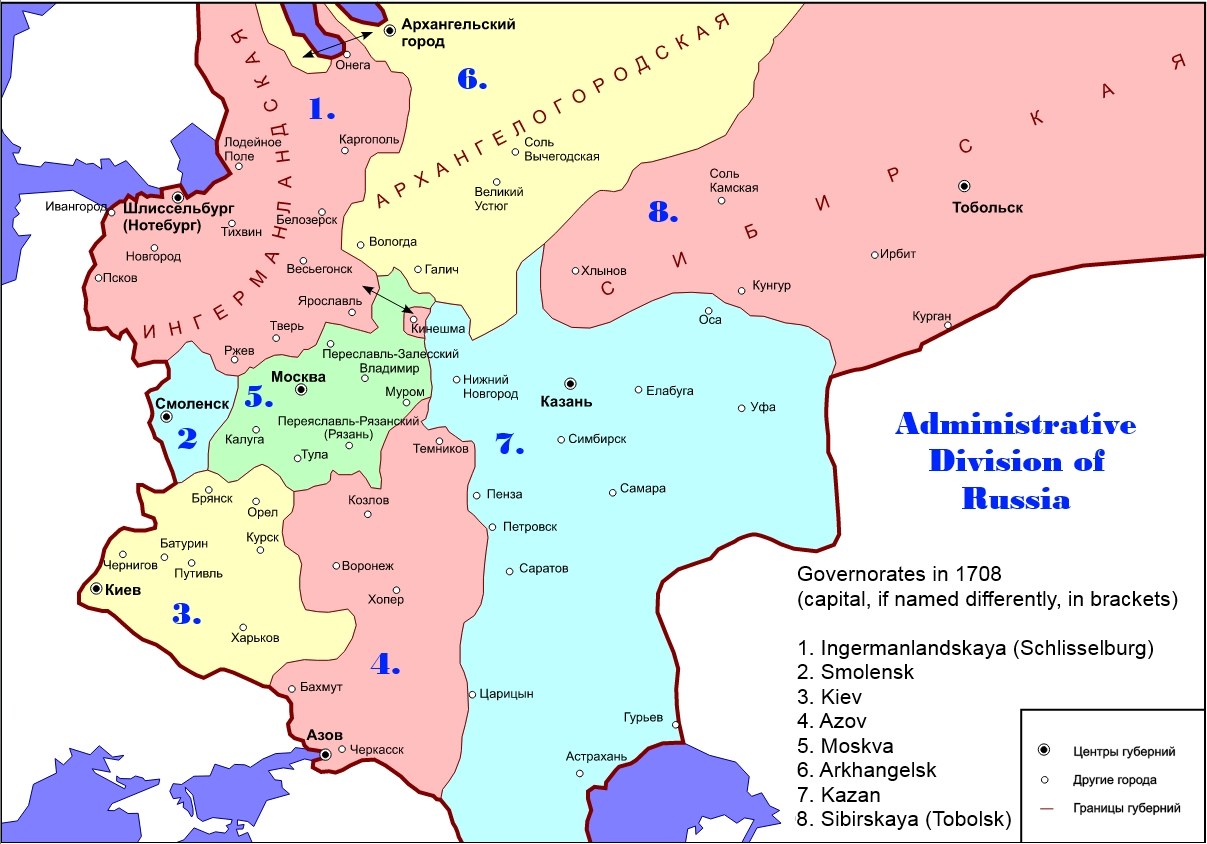
Russian Governorates in 1708

Saint Petersburg Governorate (Note: Russian: Санкт-Петербургская губерния, pre-reformed orthography: Санктъ-Петербу́ргская губе́рнія, romanized: Sankt-Peterbúrgskaya gubérniya) was a province (guberniya) of the Russian Empire, with its capital in Saint Petersburg. The governorate was composed of 44,613 square kilometres (17,225 mi^{2}) of area and 2,112,033 inhabitants. It was bordered by Estonian and Livonian Governorates to the west, Pskov Governorate to the south, Novgorod Governorate to the east, Olonets Governorate to the northeast, and Vyborg Governorate of the Grand Duchy of Finland to the north. The governorate covered most of the areas of modern Leningrad Oblast and Ida-Viru, Jõgeva, Tartu, Põlva, and Võru counties of Estonia.

== Establishment ==
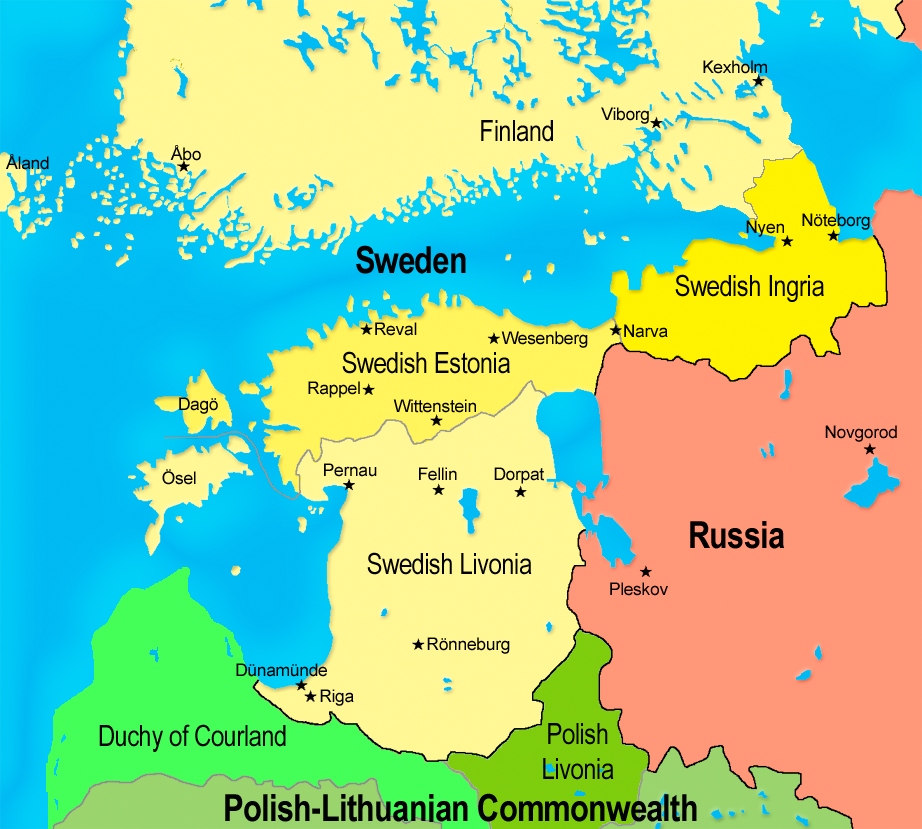
Territorial expansion of Sweden showing Swedish Ingria (1613-1656, 1658-1708) later recaptured by Russia and merged into Saint-Petersburg Governorate.

Ingermanland Governorate (Ингерманла́ндская губе́рния, Ingermanlandskaya guberniya) was created from the territories reconquered from the Swedish Empire in the Great Northern War. In 1704 prince Alexander Menshikov was appointed as its first governor, and in 1706 it was first Russian region designated as a Governorate. According to the Tsar Peter the Great's edict as on December 29 [O.S. December 18], 1708, the whole Russia was split into eight Governorates. In the same year Ingermanland Governorate was further expanded to encompass the regions of Pskov, Novgorod and other towns of Western Russia. As with the rest of the governorates, neither the borders nor internal subdivisions of Ingermanland Governorate were defined; instead, the territory was defined as a set of cities and the lands adjacent to those cities.

By another edict on June 3, 1710, the governorate was renamed St. Petersburg Governorate after the newly founded city of Saint Petersburg, and in 1721 the former Swedish Duchy of Ingria, and parts of Kexholm County and the County of Viborg and Nyslott were formally ceded to Russia by the Treaty of Nystad. After the Treaty of Åbo in 1743, the parts of Kexholm and Viborg were joined with new territorial gains from Sweden into the Governorate of Vyborg (Russian: Выборгская губерния).

From August 18, 1914 to January 26, 1924 it was named Petrograd Governorate, and during 1924–1927 — Leningrad Governorate. It was abolished on August 1, 1927 when modern Leningrad Oblast was created.

Cities included into Ingermanland Governorate at the time of its establishment
#	City	#	City	#	City
1.	St. Petersburg	12.	Narva	23.	Staraya Rusa
2.	Beloozero	13.	Olonets	24.	Toropets
3.	Bezhetskoy Verkh	14.	Opochek	25.	Torzhok
4.	Derptskoy uyezd	15.	Ostrov	26.	Tver
5.	Gdov	16.	Porkhov	27.	Uglich
6.	Izborsk	17.	Poshekhonye	28.	Ustyuzhna Zheleznopolskaya
7.	Kargopol	18.	Pskov	29.	Veliky Novgorod
8.	Kashin	19.	Romanov	30.	Yamburg
9.	Koporye	20.	Rzheva pustaya (Zavolochye)	31.	Yaroslavl
10.	Ladoga	21.	Rzheva Volodimirova		
11.	Luki Velikiye	22.	Shlisselburg		

== Administrative divisions ==
The governorate was composed of eight counties (uezds) as of January 1, 1914. Follows the table:

County		County Town	Arms of County Town	Area	Population (1897 census)
Transliteration name	Russian Cyrillic	County Town	Arms of County Town	Area	Population (1897 census)
Gdovsky	Гдовский	Gdov		8,810 km^{2} (3,400 sq mi)	145,573
Luzhsky	Лужский	Luga		10,192.7 km^{2} (3,935.4 sq mi)	133,466
Novoladozhsky	Новоладожский	Novaya Ladoga		8,707.4 km^{2} (3,361.9 sq mi)	87,841
Petergofsky	Петергофский	Petergof		2,742.5 km^{2} (1,058.9 sq mi)	140,547
Sankt-Peterburgsky	Санкт-Петербургский	Saint Petersburg (Sankt–Peterburg)		1,973.8 km^{2} (762.1 sq mi)	1,317,885
Tsarskoselsky	Царскосельский	Tsarskoye Selo		4,303.9 km^{2} (1,661.7 sq mi)	149,845
Shlisselburgsky	Шлиссельбургский	Shlisselburg		3,870.7 km^{2} (1,494.5 sq mi)	54,904
Yamburgsky	Ямбургский	Yamburg		4,014.4 km^{2} (1,550.0 sq mi)	81,972

=== Supernumerary town ===
City	Population	Part of	Arms
Gatchina	14,824	Tsarskoselsky Uyezd	
Kronstadt	59,525	Petergofsky Uyezd	
Narva	16,599	Yamburgsky Uyezd	
Oranienbaum	5,458	Petergofsky Uyezd	
Pavlovsk	5,113	Tsarskoselsky Uyezd	

=== Former city ===
City	Population	Part of	Arms
Rozhdestveno	980	Tsarskoselsky Uyezd	
Sofia	1,190	Tsarskoselsky Uyezd	

== Governorate administration ==
=== General Governors ===
- Prince Aleksandr Menshikov 12 October 1702 – May 1724
- Pyotr Apraksin May 1724 – January 1725
- Prince Aleksandr Menshikov January 1725 – 8 September 1727
- Jan Sapieha 1727 – 1728
- Burkhard Christoph von Münnich January 1728 – 1734 War Governor
- Nikolai Golovin 1742
- Peter Lacy 1743
- Vasily Repnin 1744
- Stepan Ignatiev 1744
- Boris Yusupov 1749
- Prince Mikhail Golitsin 1752 – 1754
- Peter August of Schleswig-Holstein-Sonderburg-Beck 1762
- Ivan Neplyuyev 1762 – 1764
- Ivan Glebov 1767
- Prince Aleksander Golitsin October 1769 – 8 October 1783
- Jacob Bruce 1784 – 6 October 1791
- Aleksander Romanov 6 October 1791 – 1797 War Governor
  - Nikolai Arkharov 6 October 1791 – November 1796, until 15 June 1797 acting General Governor
- Fyodor Buksgevden June 1797 – August 1798
- Pyotr von der Pahlen 8 August 1798 – 30 June 1801, until 25 August 1800 acting, from 24 March 1801 War Governor
- Mikhail Kutuzov 30 July 1801 – 9 September 1802 War Governor
- Mikhail Kamenskiy 27 August 1802 – 16 November 1802 War Governor
- Pyotr Tolstoy 28 November 1802 – 25 January 1803 War Governor
- Andrey Budberg 25 January 1803 – 17 February 1803 War Governor
- Pyotr Tolstoy 28 November 1802 – 10 September 1805 War Governor
  - Nikolai Svechin 1803 – 1806
- Sergey Vyazmitinov 10 September 1805 – 12 January 1808 War Governor
- Prince Dmitry Lobanov-Rostovskiy 12 January 1808 – 2 February 1809
- Alexander Balashov 14 February 1809 – 9 April 1810
- Sergey Vyazmitinov 10 November 1816 – 31 August 1818 War General Governor
- Mikhail Miloradovich 31 August 1818 – 15 December 1825 War General Governor
- Pavel Golenishchev-Kutuzov 27 December 1825 – 19 February 1830 War General Governor
- Pyotr Essen 17 February 1830 – 14 February 1842 War General Governor
- Aleksander Kavelin 14 February 1842 – 19 April 1846 War General Governor
- Matvey Khrapovitskiy 7 April 1846 – 31 March 1847 War General Governor
- Dmitry Shulgin 3 May 1847 – 1 January 1855 War General Governor
  - Aleksander Stroganov 1854 War Governor
- Pavel Ignatiev 28 December 1854 – 16 November 1861 War General Governor
- Aleksandr Suvorov-Rymnikskiy 16 November 1861 – 16 May 1866 War General Governor
- Iosif Gurko April 1879 – February 1880
- Pyotr Gresser February 1880 – 1892
- Viktor von Wahl 1892 – 1895
- Nikolai Kleigels 1895 – 1904
- Ivan Fullon 1904 – 1905
- Dmitry Trepov 12 January 1905 – 14 April 1905 acting General Governor
- Vladimir Dedyulin 1905 – 1906
- Vladimir von der Launits 1906 – 1907
- Daniil Drachevsky 1907 – 1914
- Aleksandr Obolensky 1914 – 1916
- Aleksandr Balk 1916 – March 1917
- Vadim Yurevich March – May 1917
- Grigory Shreider July – November 1917

=== Governors ===
- Fyodor Apraksin 1712 – 1723
- Vasily Saltykov 21 January 1734 – October 1740
- Prince Yakov Shakhovskoy October 1740 – November 1740
- Prince Vasily Nesvitsky 23 July 1761 – 17 April 1764
- Stepan Ushakov 21 April 1764 – 21 April 1773
- Stepan Perfiliev 22 September 1773 – 10 September 1774
- Karl Ungern-Sternverg 12 September 1774 – 25 July 1779
- Dmitry Volkov 4 August 1779 – 1780
- Ustin Potapov 4 August 1780 – 1 January 1784
- Pyotr Tarbeev 1 April 1784 – 18 March 1785
- Pyotr Konovnitsin 18 March 1785 – 2 September 1793
- Nikita Ryleev 2 September 1793 – 9 June 1797
- Ivan Alekseev 9 June 1797 – 28 August 1797
- Ivan Grevens 28 August 1797 – 21 December 1798
- Dmitry Glinka 22 December 1798 – 2 March 1800
- Prokopy Mishchersky 7 March 1800 – 1 June 1800
- Nikolay Khotyaintsev 1 June 1800 – 5 June 1801
- Pyotr Pankratiev 5 June 1801 – 19 July 1802
- Sergey Kushnikov 19 July 1802 – 28 October 1804
- Pyotr Paseviev 28 October 1804 – 31 January 1808
- Mikhail Mikhailovich Bakunin 31 January 1808 – 14 July 1816
- Semyon Shcherbinin 15 August 1816 – 23 November 1826
- Aleksandr Bezobrazov 25 November 1826 – 27 January 1829
- Ivan Khrapovitskiy 27 January 1829 – 11 December 1835
- Mikhail Zhemchuzhnikov 11 December 1835 – 30 December 1840
- Vasily Sheremetev 10 January 1841 – 28 June 1843
- Nikolay Zhukovskiy 10 August 1843 – 8 April 1851
- Pyotr Donaurov 8 April 1851 – 7 April 1855
- Nikolai Smirnov 7 April 1855 – 1 January 1861
- Aleksandr Bobrinsky 12 January 1861 – 13 March 1864
- Vladimir Skaryatin 20 March 1864 – 1 January 1865
- Lev Perovskiy 1 January 1865 – 22 July 1866, until 22 July 1865 acting
- Nikolay Levashov 22 July 1866 – 8 May 1871
- Iosif Lutkovskiy 9 May 1871 – 2 September 1880, until 30 March 1873 acting
- Fyodor Trepov 1873 - 1878
- Sergey Tol 2 September 1880 – May 1903
- Aleksandr Zinoviev 6 March 1903 – January 1911
- Aleksandr Adlerberg 9 January 1911 – 18 August 1914

=== Marshals of the nobility ===
Served as chair of the Assembly of Nobility

- Alexander Kurakin 1780 – 1783
- Adam Olsufiev 1783 – 1784
- Andrey Shuvalov 1784 – 1785
- Aleksander Naryshkin 1788 – 1790
- Aleksander Stroganov 1790 – 1798
- Mikhail Rumyantsev 1798 – 1801
- Pyotr Razumovsky 1801 – 1805
- Aleksander Stroganov 1805 – 1811
- Aleksey Zherebtsov 1811 – 1814
- Ilya Bezborodko 1814 – 1815
- Aleksey Zherebtsov 1815 – 1818
- Arkadiy Nelidov 1826 – 1830
- Dmitriy Durnovo 1830 – 1833
- Prince Vasiliy Dolgorukov 1833 – 1839
- Prince Golitsin 24 February 1839 – 1842
- Mikhail Potyomkin 21 March 1842 – 24 March 1854
- Pyotr Shuvalov 24 March 1854 – 29 March 1863
- Grigoriy Shcherbatov 29 March 1863 – 8 March 1866
- Vladimir Orlov-Davydov 8 March 1866 – 21 March 1869
- Aleksandr Bobrinskiy 21 March 1869 – 18 April 1872
- Andrey Shuvalov 18 April 1872 – 14 April 1876
- Aleksey Bobrinskiy 14 April 1876 – 27 January 1890
- Aleksandr Mordvinov 27 January 1890 – 1891
- Aleksandr Trubnikov 1891 – 1 February 1893
- Aleksey Bobrinskiy 1 February 1893 – 8 February 1897
- Aleksandr Zinoviev 8 February 1897 – February 1904
- Vasiliy Gudovich 15 February 1904 – March 1909
- Ivan Saltykov 8 March 1909 – 1915

== See also ==
- Administrative divisions of Russia in 1708–1710
