= Stepan Petrovich Beletsky =

Russian statesman (c. 1872 – 1918)

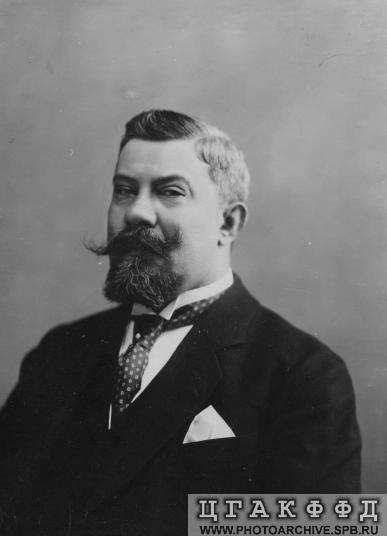
Beletsky in 1914

Stepan Petrovich Beletsky (Russian: Степа́н Петро́вич Беле́цкий; c. 1872 – 5 September 1918) was a Russian statesman who served as the head of the Police Department. He was involved in scandals around Grigori Rasputin. In January 1914, he was appointed as a senator in the State Council.

== Life ==
In 1894 he graduated in law at the University of Kiev, in the same year appointed as civil servant, responsible for art and printing. In 1899, he was appointed as governor of the Kovno Governorate in Lithuania; in 1904 he was transferred from Kovno to Vilna, in February 1907 in Samara, where he was appointed as vice-governor and applied the newly introduced land reforms by Stolypin. When Stolypin became prime minister, he invited Beletsky to become assistant director of the Police Department between August 1909 and March 1912. Beletsky became its director until 1915.

In this capacity, Beletsky was responsible for recruiting moles inside revolutionary organisations, including senior Bolshevik Roman Malinovsky, his highest paid spy, who won Vladimir Lenin's trust, and was elected as a deputy to the Fourth Duma. Some of the drafts of speeches Malinovsky delivered were found, after the revolution, to have amendments in Beletsky's handwriting. Beletsky instructed Malinovsky and his other moles to prevent the reunification of the Bolsheviks and Mensheviks.

From October 1914, Beletsky exercised 24-hour surveillance of Rasputin and his apartment. Two sets of detectives were attached to his person; one was to act undercover.

From 1 January 1915, he modified reports from Okhrana spies – the "staircase notes" – had to provide evidence about Rasputin's lifestyle. They were given to the Tsar in an unsuccessful attempt to discredit Rasputin.

On 25 March [N.S. 7 April] 1915, Rasputin left for Moscow by train, accompanied by both detectives. The following evening he is said, while inebriated, to have opened his trousers and waved his "reproductive organ" in front of a group of female gypsy singers in the Yar restaurant. Dzhunkovsky and Beletsky verified later that Rasputin never visited the Yar restaurant. Dzhunkovsky was fired in August and succeeded by Beletsky.

No entries exist after Beletsky lost his position as the director of the Police Department. Also for Bernard Pares, it was taken that the police were the enemies of Rasputin, and that the many stories which reached the public were simply their fabrications.

In September 1915, he became assistant minister of the interior until February 1916. Alexei Khvostov, Iliodor and Beletsky concocted a plan to kill Rasputin. By ukaz (decree), Beletsky was to be reassigned to Irkutsk, but the appointment was cancelled after the story was revealed in a newspaper. In early 1917, he was arrested by the Russian Provisional Government following the February Revolution and locked up in the Peter and Paul Fortress. After bail, the arrested were released, but Beletsky decided not to go abroad. He was rearrested during the Red Terror. In 1918, he was transported to Moscow and executed at Khodynka or in Petrovsky Park.

== Bibliography ==
- Figes, Orlando (1996). A People's Tragedy. The Russian Revolution 1891–1924. Jonathan Cape. ISBN 0-224-04162-2.
- Moe, Ronald C. (2011). Prelude to the Revolution: The Murder of Rasputin. Aventine Press. ISBN 978-1593307127.
- Nelipa, Margarita (2010). The Murder of Grigorii Rasputin. A Conspiracy That Brought Down the Russian Empire. Gilbert's Books. ISBN 978-0-9865310-1-9.
- Pares, Bernard (1939). The Fall of the Russian Monarchy. A Study of the Evidence. Jonathan Cape. London.
- Radzinsky, Edvard (2000). Rasputin: The Last Word. St Leonards, New South Wales, Australia: Allen & Unwin. ISBN 1-86508-529-4. OCLC 155418190. Originally in London: Weidenfeld & Nicolson.
- Rasputin, Maria (1934). My father.
