= Kamchatka (ship) =

Ship of the Russian Navy

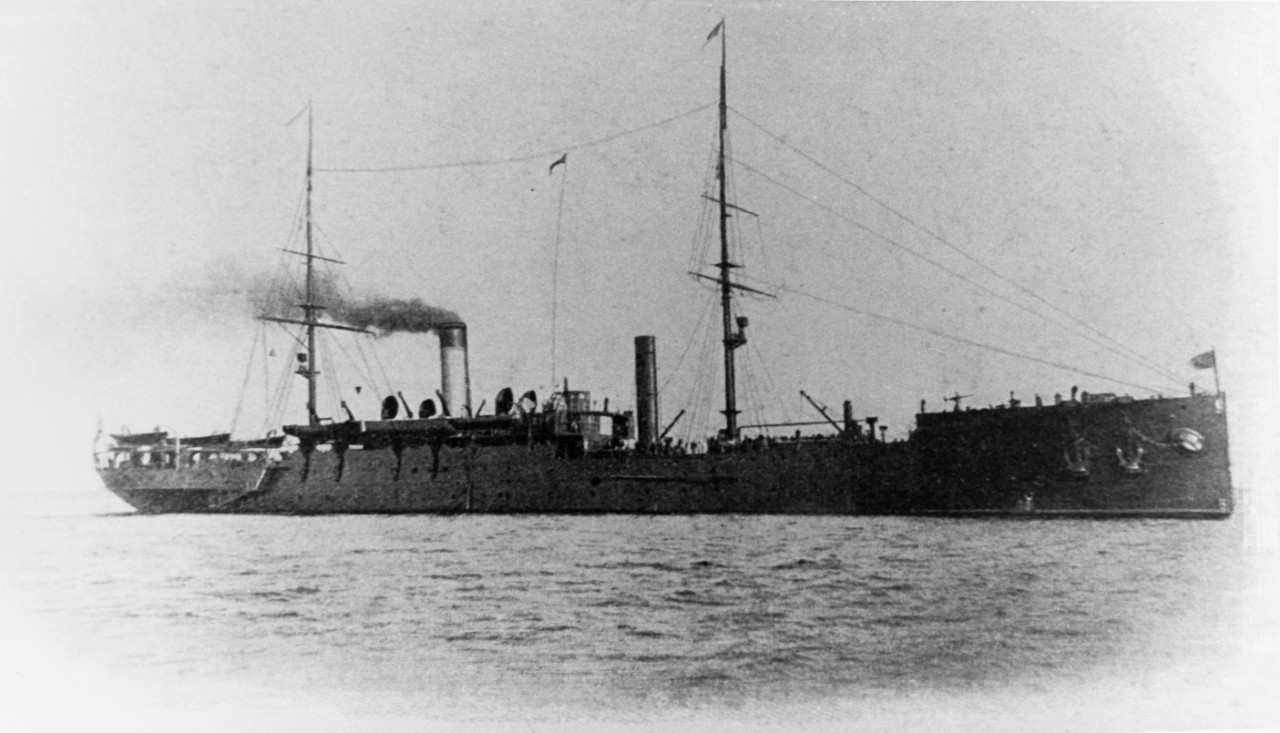
- Kamchatka

History

Russian Empire
- Name: Kamchatka (Камчатка)
- Namesake: Kamchatka Peninsula
- Builder: New Admiralty Shipyard
- Laid down: August 26, 1901
- Launched: September 18, 1902
- In service: 1903
- Out of service: 1905
- Fate: Sunk at the Battle of Tsushima, 27 May 1905

General characteristics
- Displacement: 7,200 tons
- Length: 76.25 m
- Beam: 15.25 m
- Speed: 12 knots
- Armament: 6 × 47mm cannons

Kamchatka was an armed auxiliary vessel of the Russian Navy. The ship was launched in 1903. Its short career during the Russo-Japanese War was plagued with unfortunate incidents, which ended in its sinking at the Battle of Tsushima.

== Service history ==
Originally built as a collier, Kamchatka was converted to a repair ship while still under construction. Kamchatka entered service in the Russian Baltic Fleet in 1903. Its main features were a large hold and large cranes that made it ideal for the role as a repair ship.

=== Role in the Dogger Bank incident ===
Kamchatka played a role in causing the Dogger Bank incident, where the Second Pacific Squadron opened fire on unarmed British fishing trawlers. At about 21:00 on the night of October 21, 1904, Kamchatka radioed that it was being attacked by eight Japanese destroyers or torpedo boats. Not long after, small vessels without lights were spotted, which were crossing the Russian fleet's course. Deciding that the vessels were Japanese, the battleships opened fire.

=== Other actions ===
On 25 December 1904 while the fleet was sailing between Lüderitz Bay and Nosy Boraha the Kamchatka sent a signal to the Russian battleship Knyaz Suvorov that was interpreted by the Knyaz Suvorov as "do you see the torpedo boat" causing some alarm until the signal was correctly understood.

While stopping in Madagascar, several ships in the fleet acquired several local predatory animals, Kamchatka being no exception.

There are many apocryphal legends associated with Kamchatka, such as:

- It falsely claimed to be sinking, when the only damage to it was a cracked steam pipe
- It became separated from the fleet, fired 300 shells at German, Swedish and French ships before rejoining the squadron
- It fired a live shell during a salute for a funeral, which hit the Aurora

=== Sinking ===
The Kamchatka was hit by Japanese shellfire during the 1905 Battle of Tsushima. This disabled its rudder, forcing it to turn. Its engines were later disabled, and ultimately the ship sank. About 50 of the crew escaped on boats and were later picked up by Japanese fishermen and taken as prisoners of war.
