= Dmitry Lobanov-Rostovsky =

Russian general and administrator

Dimitri Ivanovich Lobanov-Rostovsky
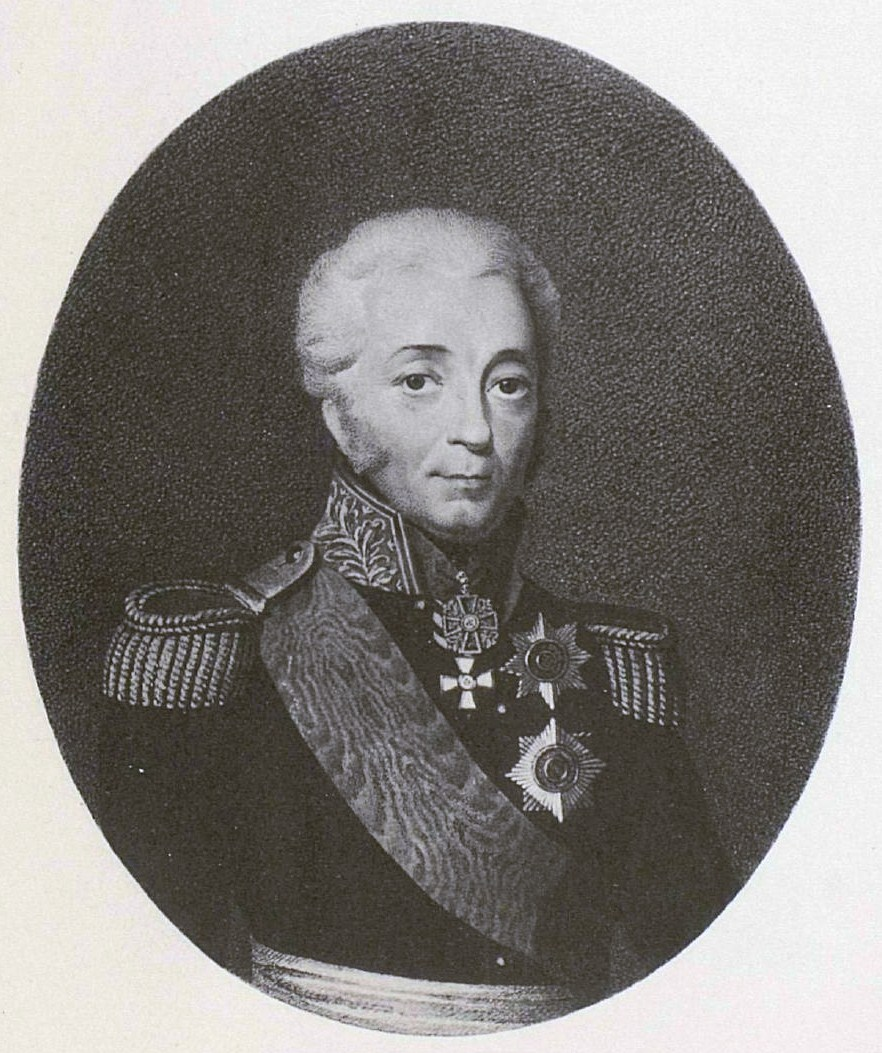
- Born: 20 September 1758; Moscow
- Died: 25 July 1838 (aged 79); Saint Petersburg
- Military career
- Allegiance: Imperial Russia
- Branch: Infantry
- Service years: 1779–1827 (with breaks)
- Rank: General of Infantry

Prince Dmitry Ivanovich Lobanov-Rostovsky (Russian: Дми́трий Ива́нович Лоба́нов-Росто́вский; 20 September 1758 – 25/26 July 1838) was a Russian general and statesman. He stemmed from the Lobanov-Rostovsky family.

== Biography ==
After Russia's defeat at Friedland on 14 June 1807, Russia asked for an armistice, which Lobanov-Rostovsky signed on Russia's behalf on 30 June 1807 (with marshal Louis-Alexandre Berthier signing for France).

With prince Alexander Kurakin, he participated in the following negotiations and was one of the plenipotentiaries who signed of the Treaty of Tilsit on 7 July 1807, on behalf of the Tzar.

== Career ==
From 12 January 1808 to 12 February 1809 Rostovsky was governor of Saint Petersburg.

From 1810 Since December 1810 Rostovsky was the Livonian, Estland and Kurland governor-general and the Riga military governor, taking over from Friedrich von Buxhoeveden, until 1812, when he himself was replaced Philip Paulucci at the beginning of the 1812 war.

Under Rostovsky governorship Riga garrison was strengthened and the Daugavgrīvas fortress was rebuilt. He was minister of justice from 25 August 1817 to 18 October 1827.
