= Okhrana =

Secret police force of the Russian Empire

Okhrana Guard Department Department for the Protection of Public Safety and Order
- Охранное отделение Отделение по охранению общественной безопасности и порядка
- Emblem of the Ministry of the Interior

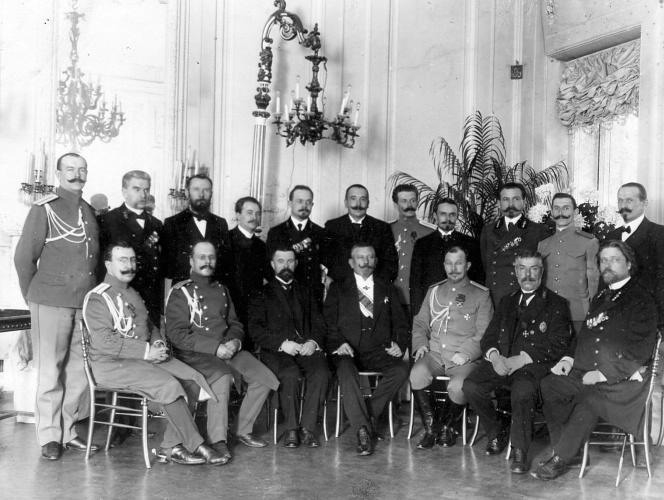
- Okhrana group photograph in St. Petersburg, Russian Empire in 1905

Agency overview
- Formed: 1881; 145 years ago
- Dissolved: 1917; 109 years ago
- Superseding agency: PVRK
- Jurisdiction: Russian Empire
- Headquarters: Petrograd

The Department for the Protection of Public Safety and Order, (Note: Russian: Отделение по охранению общественной безопасности и порядка, romanized: Otdelenie po okhraneniyu obshchestvennoy bezopadnosti i poryadka) usually called the Guard Department (Note: Russian: Охранное отделение, romanized: Okhrannoye otdelenie) and commonly abbreviated in modern English sources as the Okhrana, (Note: Russian: Охрана, IPA: [ɐˈxranə], lit. 'The Guard') was a secret police force of the Russian Empire. Created in 1880, it was a part of the Imperial police department under the Ministry of Internal Affairs (MVD) in the late 19th century and early 20th century, aided by the Special Corps of Gendarmes.

== Overview ==
Formed to combat political terrorism, left-wing politics, and revolutionary activity, the Okhrana operated offices throughout the Russian Empire, as well as satellite agencies in a number of foreign countries. It concentrated on monitoring the activities of Russian revolutionaries abroad, including in Paris, where Okhrana agent Pyotr Rachkovsky (1853–1910) was based from 1884 to 1902 before he returned to service in Saint Petersburg from 1905 to 1906.

The Okhrana deployed multiple methods, including assassination, clandestine and covert operations, counterintelligence, espionage, HUMINT, manhunt for the capture or kill of high-value targets, and "perlustration"—the reading of private correspondence. The Okhrana's Foreign Agency also monitored revolutionary activity. The Okhrana became notorious for its agents provocateurs, including Jacob Zhitomirsky (born 1880, a leading Bolshevik and close associate of Vladimir Lenin), Yevno Azef (1869–1918), Roman Malinovsky (1876–1918), and Dmitry Bogrov (1887–1911).

The Okhrana tried to compromise the labour movement by setting up police-run trade unions, a practice known as zubatovshchina. The communists blamed the Okhrana in part for the Bloody Sunday event of January 1905, when Tsarist troops killed hundreds of unarmed protesters who were marching during a demonstration organized by Father Georgy Gapon,) and with the participation of Pyotr Rutenberg.

Many historians, such as the German Konrad Heiden and the Russian historian Mikhail Lepekhine maintain that Matvei Golovinski, a writer and Okhrana agent, fabricated the first edition of The Protocols of the Elders of Zion (1903). The organization also fabricated documentation connected with the antisemitic Beilis trial of 1913.

Suspects captured by the Okhrana were passed to the judicial system of the Russian Empire.

The Okhrana was perpetually underfunded and understaffed; before 1914 it had just 49 employees split between seven offices and never had more than 2,000 informants at any one time. It never received more than 10% of the total police budget.

=== Use of torture ===
Despite the reforms in the early 19th century, the practice of torture was never truly abolished. Possibly, the formation of the Okhrana led to increasing use of torture, due to the Okhrana using methods such as arbitrary arrest, detention and torture to gain information. Claims persisted the Okhrana had operated torture chambers in places like Warsaw, Riga, Odessa, and most of the urban centers.

== History ==
Forerunners of the Okhrana as a Russian security service included the Secret Prikaz (Taynyy Prikaz) (1654–1676), the Preobrazhensky Prikaz (1686–1726), the Secret Chancellery (1731–1762), the Secret Expedition (1762–1801), and the Third Section of His Imperial Majesty's Own Chancellery (1826–1880).

The first special security department was the Department on Protecting the Order and Public Peace under the Head of Saint Petersburg, set up in 1866 after a failed assassination attempt on Emperor Alexander II, with a staff of 12 investigators. Its street address, Fontanka, 16, was publicly known in the Russian Empire. After another failed assassination attempt, on August 6, 1880, the Emperor, acting on proposals made by Count Loris-Melikov, established the Department of State Police under Ministry of the Interior (MVD) and transferred part of the Special Corps of Gendarmes and the Third Section of the Imperial Chancellery to the new body. The position of Chief of Gendarmes was merged with that of the Minister, and Commander of the Corps was assigned as a Deputy of the Minister. Still, these measures did not prevent the assassination of Alexander II in March 1881.

In an attempt to implement preventive security measures, Emperor Alexander III (r. 1881–1894) immediately set up two more Security and Investigation (охранно-розыскные) secret police stations, supervised by Gendarme officers, in Moscow and Warsaw; they became the basis of the later Okhrana. The Imperial Gendarmerie still operated as security police in the rest of the country through their Gubernial and Uyezd Directorates. The Emperor also established the Special Conference under the MVD (1881), which had the right to declare a State of Emergency Security in various parts of the Empire (which was actively used in the time of 1905 Revolution) and subordinated all of the imperial police forces to the Commander of the Gendarmes (1882).

The rise of the socialist movements led to the integration of security forces. From 1898 the Special Section (Особый отдел) of the Department of Police succeeded the Gendarmes in the role of gaining information from domestic and foreign agents and "perlustration". Following the Socialist-Revolutionary Party's assassination of MVD Minister Dmitry Sipyagin on April 2, 1902, the new Minister Vyacheslav von Plehve gradually relieved the Directorates of Gendarmes of their investigation power in favor of Security and Investigation Stations (Охранно-розыскное отделение) under respective Mayors and Governors (who as a matter of fact were subordinate to the MVD Minister).

=== Pre-1905 ===
The Okhrana used many seemingly unorthodox methods in the pursuit of its mission to defend the Tsarist monarchy; indeed, some of the Okhrana's activities even contributed to the wave of domestic unrest and revolutionary terror that they were intended to quell. Perhaps most paradoxical of all was the Okhrana's collaboration with revolutionary organizations. Early Okhrana agents to work alongside revolutionaries included Lieutenant-Colonel Georgy Sudeykin of the Saint Petersburg Special Section, who, in 1882, set up an illegal printing operation to publish the revolutionary People's Will literature with Okhrana funds. Sudeykin and his colleague, a revolutionary-turned-police-informant named Sergey Degayev, passed drafts of the publication through Okhrana censors before printing. This episode marked the beginning of the Okhrana's efforts to surreptitiously observe, but also influence and undermine, revolutionary movements. This focus on infiltrating and influencing revolutionary groups, rather than merely identifying and arresting their members, intensified with the innovations of one Okhrana bureau chief, Sergey Zubatov. While P. I. Rachkovsky, as head of the Okhrana's Foreign Agency, had long ordered Okhrana agents to infiltrate and influence revolutionary movements abroad, Zubatov brought these tactics to a new level by setting up Okhrana-controlled trade unions, the foundation of police socialism. Perhaps recognizing the same discontent among factory workers that the Bolsheviks sought to exploit to start a revolution, Zubatov hoped the unions would mollify factory workers with improvements in working conditions and thus prevent workers from joining revolutionary movements that threatened the monarchy. To this end, Zubatov set up the Moscow Mechanical Production Workers' Mutual Aid Society in May 1901. After Zubatov became head of the Special Section in 1902, he expanded his trade unions from Moscow to St. Petersburg and to Southern Russia.

Zubatovite trade unions achieved moderate success at channeling workers' political agitations away from revolutionary movements and toward labor improvements, especially in the cities of Minsk and Odessa, with one high-ranking official noting that many revolutionaries and workers were joining the unions. However, Zubatov, if not police socialism, became discredited in the summer of 1903 after the Okhrana officer in charge of the Odessa union allowed a strike to get out of hand, causing a mass movement which paralyzed the region. Although the police-run unions continued to operate after Zubatov's ousting, without Okhrana funding, they proved more a liability than an asset. The Assembly of Working Men, a police-run union with about 6,000–8,000 members, formed by the alleged Okhrana agent Father Georgy Gapon, sparked the Bloody Sunday massacre of January 1905, a milestone in the Revolution of 1905 when union members marched peacefully on the Winter Palace in Saint Petersburg and were fired upon by Imperial soldiers. The Okhrana complemented police socialism and other projects to prevent the conditions in which revolutionary movements could take hold by pursuing initiatives to curtail the activities of existing organizations. Yevno Azef, the notorious Okhrana provocateur who became the head of the Socialist Revolutionary Fighting Organization (SRFO), epitomized the Okhrana's inscrutable practice of revolutionary-group infiltration. While the Okhrana managed to embed many of its agents in revolutionary organizations, the police preferred to slowly gather intelligence and to attempt to interfere with revolutionary work surreptitiously rather than to arrest known revolutionaries immediately. This policy led to numerous dubious acts on the part of police spies, who needed to participate in revolutionary activities to avoid suspicion, as when Yevno Azef, as head of the SRFO, ordered the assassination of V. K. Plehve on July 15, 1904.

=== The Revolution of 1905 ===
For over twenty years, the Okhrana had focused on interfering with the activities of relatively small, and distinct, revolutionary groups. The Revolution of 1905, characterized by seemingly spontaneous marches and strikes, exposed the Okhrana's inefficacy at controlling mass popular movements. Not only did the Okhrana lack the capacity to prevent the mass movements of 1905, or even to contain them once they began, the Okhrana's misguided attempts may even have worsened the unrest. D. F. Trepov, the Assistant Minister of the Interior in charge of police affairs, and P. I. Rachkovsky, now in charge of all domestic political-police operations, attempted to mount an aggressive offensive against those they believed to be responsible for the unrest, namely zemstvo employees, in May 1905, but backed down three months later. In October of that year, Trepov again attempted a violent repression of the revolution, only to call off the effort for lack of manpower. Since these attempts at repression never reached fruition, they only served to aggravate the already enraged Russian populace and to deepen their distrust of the Imperial government. Trepov's replacement by P. N. Durnovo in late-October ushered in a period of even more vicious repression of the revolutionaries. Indicative of this new period is the head of the Saint Petersburg Special Section, A. V. Gerasimov's, strike on the Saint Petersburg Soviet. To Emperor Nicholas II's delight, Gerasimov arrested delegates of the Soviet en masse on December 3, 1905. Along with this repression and the end of the Revolution of 1905 came a shift in the political police's mentality; gone were the days of Nicholas I's white-gloved moral police: post-1905 the political police feared that the Russian people were as eager to destroy them as to depose the Emperor.

Following the outbreak of the 1905 Revolution and assassination of Plehve, Pyotr Stolypin, as the new MVD Minister and Chairman of the Council of Ministers, set up a nationwide net of Security Stations. By 1908, there were 31 Stations, and more than 60 by 1911. Two more Special Sections of the Department of Police were organized in 1906. The centralized Security Section of the Department of Police was created on 9 February 1907; it was located at 16, Fontanka, Saint Petersburg.

The exposure of Yevno Azef (who had organized many assassinations, including that of Plehve) and Dmitri Bogrov (who assassinated Stolypin in 1911) as Okhrana double agents put the agency's methods under great suspicion; the organization was further compromised by the discovery of many similar double agents-provocateur. In Autumn 1913, all of the Security Stations except the original Moscow, Saint Petersburg, and Warsaw ones were dismissed. The start of World War I in 1914 marked a shift from anti-revolutionary activities of the Department of Police to counter-intelligence; however, the efforts of the department were poorly synchronized with counter-intelligence units of the General Staff and of the Army.

=== The 1917 Russian Revolution (February Revolution and October Revolution) ===
Just as the Okhrana had once sponsored trade unions to divert activist energy from political causes, so too did the secret police attempt to promote the Bolshevik party, as the Bolsheviks seemed a relatively harmless alternative to more violent revolutionary groups. Indeed, to the Okhrana, Lenin seemed to actively hinder the revolutionary movement by denouncing other revolutionary groups and refusing to cooperate with them.

To aid the Bolsheviks at the expense of other revolutionaries, the Okhrana helped Roman Malinovsky (a police spy who had managed to rise within the Bolshevik hierarchy and gain Lenin's trust) in his bid to become a Bolshevik delegate to the Duma in 1912. To this end, the Okhrana sequestered Malinovsky's criminal record and arrested other candidates for the seat.

According to the transcribed recollections of Nikolay Vladimirovich Veselago, a former Okhrana officer and relative of the director of the Russian police department Stepan Petrovich Beletsky, both Malinovsky and Joseph Stalin reported on Lenin as well as on each other although Stalin was unaware that Malinovosky was also a penetration agent.

Malinovsky won the seat and led the Bolshevik delegation in the Fourth Duma until 1914, but even with the information Malinovsky and other informants provided to the Okhrana, the police were unprepared for the rise of Bolshevism in 1917. Although the secret police had agents within the Bolshevik organization, other factors contributed to the Okhrana's inefficacy at averting the events of 1917. Among these factors was the ban on police spies within the military promulgated by the Deputy Minister of the Interior Vladimir Dzhunkovsky, who found the practice dishonorable and damaging to morale. While the beginning of World War I in 1914 moved the Okhrana's attentions initially from countering revolutionaries to countering German espionage, the focus quickly shifted back as it emerged that the Germans were heavily funding Russian revolutionary groups in order to destabilize the Russian Empire.

Despite the renewed attention, the Russian Revolution of 1917 took the secret police, and the country, by surprise. Indeed, the Okhrana's persistent focus on revolutionary groups may have resulted in the secret police not fully appreciating the deep-seated popular unrest brewing in Russia.

The revolutionaries identified the Okhrana as one of the main symbols of Tsarist repression, and its headquarters were sacked and burned on 27 February 1917. The newly formed Provisional Government then disbanded the whole organization and released most of the political prisoners held by the Tsarist regime. Revelations of the Okhrana's earlier abuses heightened public hostility towards the secret police after the 1917 February Revolution and made it very dangerous to be a political policeman. That fact, along with the Petrograd Soviet's insistence on the dissolution of the regular Tsarist police force, as well as of the political police, meant that the Okhrana quickly and quietly disappeared.

=== Successor organizations ===
Some Okhrana functionaries continued their activities in the civil-war period (1917–1923) within the White Army, notably in the OSVAG (Russian: ОСВАГ – ОСВедомительное АГентство, romanized: OSVAG – OSVedomitel'noe AGentsvo, lit. 'Information Agency').

After the 1917 October Revolution, the government of the Russian Soviet Federative Socialist Republic under Vladimir Lenin replaced the Okhrana with a Soviet security organization – the much larger and more efficient Cheka in December 1917, supplemented by the GRU (military intelligence) from November 1918. The Cheka and its successor organizations (including the State Political Directorate (GPU), the Joint State Political Directorate (OGPU), and the NKVD) eventually became the KGB (1954–1991) after the death of Soviet leader Joseph Stalin in March 1953. After the dissolution of the Soviet Union in December 1991, the KGB split into the Federal Counterintelligence Service (FSK; later reorganized into the Federal Security Service (FSB) in 1995) and the Foreign Intelligence Service (SVR).

== See also ==
- Chronology of Soviet secret police agencies
- Petrograd Military Revolutionary Committee (October–December 1917)
- MGB (1946–1953)
