= Empire Under Attack =

- Genre: Historical
- Written by: Elena Raiskaya; Arkady Tigay; Igor Spritz
- Directed by: Sergey Gazarov; Andrey Malyukov; Vyacheslav Nikiforov; Zinovy Royzman
- Starring: Igor Livanov; Valentin Bukin; Denis Zaitsev
- Composers: Aleksei Grigoriev; Aleksei Zalivalov; Isaac Schwartz
- Country of origin: Russia
- Original language: Russian
- No. of series: 1
- No. of episodes: 12

Production
- Producers: Anatoly Maksimov; Konstantin Ernst
- Running time: 624 minutes
- Production company: Svarog-film

Original release
- Network: Channel One Russia
- Release: 15 October 2000

Empire under Attack (Russian: Империя под ударом, romanized: Imperiya pod udarom) is a 12-episode 2000 Russian miniseries, about the confrontation of the Security Department and the SR Combat Organization at the beginning of the 20th century.

The series covers eight years of the history of the Russian Empire – from 1901 to 1908.

== Plot ==
At the beginning of the 20th century, Moscow and St. Petersburg were shocked by the unprecedented cruelty of terrorists. A wave of loud political murders is rolling around the country. Combat organizations are preparing the collapse of the monarchy. The authorities are trying to maintain order in the country. The Imperial Security Office creates a special investigative team, which is charged with all means to prevent a future catastrophe.

== Cast ==
- Igor Livanov as Investigator of the Security Department of St. Petersburg titular counselor (in the 12th episode collegiate counselor) Pavel Nesterovich Putilovsky
- Valentin Bukin as Evgrafi Petrovich Medyannikov
- Denis Zaitsev as Lieutenant baron Ivan Karlovich Berg, demolition engineer
- Tatiana Bedova as Leyda Karlovna
- Vladimir Bogdanov as Yevno Azef
- Aleksei Serebryakov as Boris Savinkov
- Yuri Galtsev as Alexander Iosifovich Frank
- Yuri Orlov as Yakov Grigorievich Sazonov, chief of the St. Petersburg security department
- Sergey Zuev as Alexey Vikentiev
- Olga Samoshina as cashier Maria Maksimovskaya
- Igor Dobryakov as Chief of the Police Department of Tuzlukov
- Konstantin Khabensky as SR terrorist Grigory Gershuni
- Alexey Zuev as journalist Andrei Yakovlevich Vershinin
- Olga Budina as Olga
- Ilze Liepa as ballerina Tamara Karsavina
- Yuliya Rutberg as Lyubov Azef
- Anna Banshchikova as the mistress of Azef Hannah Clayfer
- Lyudmila Kurepova as Nina Neklyudova
- Georgy Shtil as owner of the pharmacy Pevzner
- Andrei Zibrov as Ageev Vladimir Mikhailovich - Topaz
- Ivan I. Krasko as elder Kondraty
- Nikolai Yeremenko Jr. as Vyacheslav von Plehve
- Leonid Nevedomsky as Minister of Internal Affairs Dmitry Sipyagin
- Marina Aleksandrova as Maria Stolypina
- Alexander Anisimov as Yegor Sozonov
- Irina Apeksimova as Dora Brilliant
- Aleksandr Domogarov as Georgy Gapon
- Viktor Khozyainov as Chukhna
- Elena Kucherenko as Sokolovskaya Olympiad Georgievna
- Gennady Smirnov as Stepan Balmashov
- Alexander Stroyev as Kraft
- Nikita Tatarenkov as Ivan Kalyayev
- Tamara Urzhumova as Vanda Kazimirovna
- Alexander Karpukhov as Pisarenko
- Vladimir Sterzhakov as Doctor Dubovitsky
- Viktoriya Isakova as episode
- Ksenia Rappoport as Alina
- Valery Barinov as Rataev Leonid Aleksandrovich
- Andrey Fedortsov as Aleksei Pokotilov
- Andrey Astrakhantsev as retired lieutenant Alexander Baklanov
- Olga Sukhorukova as Tatyana Nechaeva
- Boris Plotnikov as Grand Duke Sergei Alexandrovich
- Yelena Safonova as Grand Duchess Elizaveta Fedorovna
- Yuri Mitrofanov as Moscow mayor Major-General Volkov
- Aleksandr Porokhovshchikov as Moscow Governor Vladimir Dzhunkovsky
- Nikolai Chindyajkin as vice-director of the Police Department Pyotr Rachkovsky
- Oleg Dmitriev as Alexey Cheremukhin
- Georgy Traugot as SR member Pinhas Rutenberg
- Alexey Fedkin as Maxim Gorky
- Yuri Tarasov as Solomon Ryss (Mortimer)
- Alexander Zhmakin as Mikhail Sokolov
- Nikita Eryshev as Nikolay Lubomudrov
- Marina Zasukhina as Miss Lisa (8th episode Kamikaze)
- Aleksandr Feklistov as Pyotr Stolypin
- Andrei Tolubeyev as Managing Director of Stolypin Sergei Valerianovich Muromtsev
- Ernst Romanov as Chief of the St. Petersburg Security Department Major-General Alexander Vasilievich Gerasimov
- Andrey Rudensky as Teacher of the English Gymnasium Pyotr Stoedzinsky
