= Dora Brilliant =

Ukrainian socialist revolutionary (1880–1907)

- Дора Бриллиант
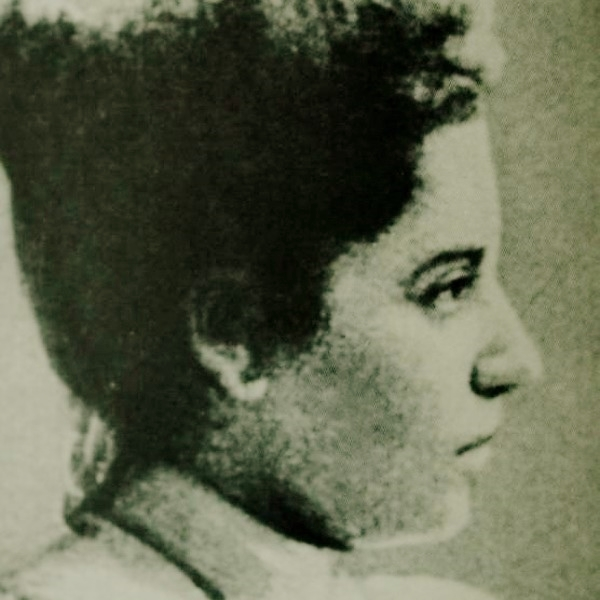
- Brilliant, c. 1905
- Born: Dora Vulfovna Brilliant; 1880; Kherson, Russian Empire (modern-day Ukraine)
- Died: 1907 (aged 26–27); Saint Petersburg, Russian Empire
- Political party: Socialist Revolutionary Party
- Other political affiliations: SR Combat Organisation
- Opponent: Russian Empire

Dora Vulfovna Brilliant (Russian: Дора Вульфовна Бриллиант; 1880–1907) was a Ukrainian socialist revolutionary. She manufactured bombs for the SR Combat Organisation, which used them to carry out assassinations against the interior minister Vyacheslav von Plehve and Grand Duke Sergei Alexandrovich. She struggled to reconcile her view of the necessity of political assassinations with her own discomfort with violence, believing that self-sacrifice was the only way to justify it. She became depressed while working on the assassinations, and after she was arrested and imprisoned for her part in them, she died in prison.

== Biography ==
=== Early life and activism ===
Dora Brilliant was born into a middle-class Ukrainian Jewish family in Kherson in 1880. Her father was a wealthy merchant. Her family refused to provide her with an education due to their Orthodox religious beliefs, so Brilliant went to school on her own initiative and trained in midwifery. Although her biographers do not mention any direct experiences with antisemitism, they portrayed her attraction to activism as a response to racial discrimination, in contrast to her working-class Jewish comrades.

After participating in a political demonstration, Brilliant was internally exiled to Poltava, where she met the revolutionary socialists Grigory Gershuni, Catherine Breshkovsky and Petr Nikolaev. Through them, Brilliant joined the Socialist-Revolutionary Party (PSR) after it was founded in 1902. She operated the party's clandestine press, distributing its literature throughout the country. But peaceful activism did not satisfy her and she pushed for the party to involve her in more revolutionary activism. In 1904, she joined the SR Combat Organization, under the recommendation of Boris Savinkov.

=== Bomb-making ===
She then dedicated herself fully to revolutionary activism. Her comrades from the time reported that she appeared to be extremely depressed. Savinkov recalled her being remarkably quiet and said she "did not know the joy of life". Julius Martov said he saw the "age-old sorrow of the Jewish people" in her eyes. She restricted her activities to the service of the organisation, for which she manufactured improvised explosive devices. She had been motivated to join the combat organisation mainly by idealism. She was not personally interested in political theory; to Brilliant, terrorism represented the essence of the socialist revolution. Savinkov attempted to downplay her commitment to terrorism, saying she was actually devoted to revolution. But other biographies depicted her as having an irrational devotion to political terrorism.

Her first mission in the SR Combat Organization was to assassinate interior minister Vyacheslav von Plehve. She and Savinkov posed as a married couple and rented a flat together with Praskovya Ivanovskaya and Yegor Sazonov, who posed as their servants. Brilliant demanded to be the one to throw the bomb, declaring her desire to die as a form of atonement for the life they were about to take. Although she believed it necessary to assassinate Plehve, she struggled with being personally responsible for killing someone. But Savinkov overruled her, as he believed women should not commit terrorist acts if men were there to do so. He ordered Brilliant and Ivanovskaya to leave town before the attack, which deeply upset Brilliant. The assassination went ahead, with the SR Combat Organisation killing the interior minister in 1903.

After the death of a comrade in an accidental explosion while manufacturing a bomb, Brilliant made another bomb intended for the assassination of Grand Duke Sergei Alexandrovich, in another operation directed by Savinkov. On 2 February 1905, while Brilliant kept watch, the intended assassin Ivan Kalyayev failed to carry out the attack, as the duke's family had come with him. The assassination was ultimately carried out on 4 February, when Kalyayev threw Brilliant's bomb under the duke's carriage, killing him.

According to Savinkov, Brilliant cried when he informed her that Sergei Alexandrovich had been assassinated, feeling personal responsibility for the attack; however, other SR members disputed this portrayal of her as overly emotional. Brilliant struggled to reconcile her advocacy of terrorism with her own personal moral aversion to violence. Although she repeatedly requested permission to carry out such terrorist attacks, she never fully accepted the act of killing. Savinkov believed that this cognitive dissonance was explained by her wanting to be on an equal footing with her comrades that undertook dangerous tasks and by her desire for martyrdom. She believed terrorism was only justified by self-sacrifice, which led Ivanovskaya to conclude she was a fundamentally good person, despite her commitment to violence. Savinkov said that, to Brilliant, "it would have been easier to die than to kill".

=== Capture and death ===
Following the arrest of 17 members of the Combat Organisation in March 1905, Brilliant initially managed to escape capture. Kalyayev refused to give up his comrades, including Brilliant, to the police, allowing her to continue making bombs for the SR combat organisation. But later that year, she was arrested for her part in the assassinations of Plehve and Sergei Alexandrovich. She was imprisoned in the Peter and Paul Fortress, where her health deteriorated and she experienced a mental breakdown, having become exhausted after participating in a hunger strike. She died in prison in 1907. In his memoirs, Savinkov said that "death [came as] a liberation for her".

== Legacy ==
Brilliant became known as one of the most prominent female terrorists of the 1905 Russian Revolution. Historian Nadezda Petrusenko compared her story with those of Fruma Frumkina and Rashel Lurie, two other middle-class Jewish women who had devoted themselves to political terrorism for the SRs. Historian Semion Lyandres listed her alongside Frumkina, Aleksandra Izmailovich and Maria Spiridonova, who he called "living revolutionary legends". In the 1905 novel Teni utra, Mikhail Artsybashev modelled one of the characters after Dora Brilliant. In the 1909 novel The Pale Horse, Boris Savinkov gave a fictionalised account of the assassination of Alexandrovich, portraying Brilliant through the character of Erna. In his 1951 essay The Rebel, Albert Camus opined that, in Brilliant's ideology, "one life appeared as payment for another" and both lives were a sacrifice for her revolutionary ideal. Camus described Brilliant and her SR comrades as "delicate murderers", due to their view that assassination was "both necessary and unacceptable", which he considered a respectable position. Brilliant appears as a character in the 2003 historical novel Your Mouth Is Lovely, by Nancy Richler. In the 2004 film adaptation of Savinkov's novel, The Rider Named Death, Erna was played by Kseniya Rappoport, who bore a resemblance to Brilliant.

== Bibliography ==
- Crossland, James (2023). "All towards its end". The rise of devils. Manchester University Press. pp. 246–263. doi:10.7765/9781526160690.00026. ISBN 9781526160690.
- Gamsa, Mark (2008). The Chinese Translation of Russian Literature. Brill. doi:10.1163/ej.9789004168442.i-430. ISBN 9789004168442.
- Geifman, Anna (1992). "Aspects of early twentieth-century Russian terrorism: The socialist-revolutionary combat organization". Terrorism and Political Violence. 4 (2): 23–46. doi:10.1080/09546559208427147.
- Geifman, Anna (2019). "Terrorism as Veiled Suicide: A Comparative Analysis". Studies in Conflict & Terrorism. 45 (7): 608–625. doi:10.1080/1057610X.2019.1680185.
- Hillyar, Anna; McDermid, Jane (2000). Revolutionary Women in Russia, 1870-1917: A Study in Collective Biography. Manchester University Press. ISBN 9780719048388.
- Knight, Amy (1979). "Female Terrorists in the Russian Socialist Revolutionary Party". The Russian Review. 38 (2): 139–159. doi:10.2307/128603. JSTOR 128603.
- Lyandres, Semion (1989). "The 1918 Attempt on the Life of Lenin: A New Look at the Evidence". Slavic Review. 48 (3): 432–448. doi:10.2307/2498997. JSTOR 2498997.
- Morisi, Eve (2018). "Staging the limit: Albert Camus's just assassins and the il/legitimacy of terrorism". In Herman, P. C. (ed.). Terrorism and Literature. Cambridge University Press. pp. 263–282. doi:10.1017/9781316987292.016. ISBN 9781316987292.
- Petrusenko, Nadezda (2017). Creating the Revolutionary Heroines: The Case of Female Terrorists of the PSR (PhD). Stockholm University. ISBN 978-91-7797-081-1.
- Petrusenko, Nadezda (2022). "A conservative turn in a patriarchal society? The entangled memory of female political activism in post-Soviet Russia". In Miklóssy, Katalin; Kangaspuro, Markku (eds.). Conservatism and Memory Politics in Russia and Eastern Europe. Routledge. pp. 25–44. doi:10.4324/9781003251743. ISBN 978-1-032-17085-5.
- Ternon, Yves (2016). "Russian Terrorism, 1878–1908". In Chaliand, Gérard (ed.). The History of Terrorism: From Antiquity to ISIS. University of California Press. pp. 132–174. doi:10.1525/9780520966000-009. ISBN 9780520966000.
- Vid, Natalia (2007). Revolution and Female’s Destiny in Nancy Richler’s Novel Your Mouth is Lovely (PDF). European Seminar for Graduate Students in Canadian Studies. Vol. 15. pp. 75–88.
- Wakerley, I. C. (1976). "The 'Delicate Murder' of the Grand Duke Sergei of Russia (1905)". Theoria: A Journal of Social and Political Theory (47): 1–9. JSTOR 41801605.
- Weinberg, Leonard; Eubank, William (2011). "Women's Involvement in Terrorism". Gender Issues. 28 (1–2): 22–49. doi:10.1007/s12147-011-9101-8.
