= Combat Organization of the Socialist Revolutionary Party =

Russian terrorist organization (1902–1907)

- Боевая организация партии социалистов-революционеров, Boyevaya organizatsiya partii sotsialistov-revolyutsionerov
- Leaders: Grigory Gershuni (1902–1903); Boris Savinkov (1903–1907); Yevno Azef
- Dates active: 1902–1907
- Active regions: Russian Empire
- Ideology: Revolutionary socialism; Agrarian socialism
- Political position: Left-wing
- Size: Fluctuating; ~30 members in 1906
- Part of: Socialist Revolutionary Party (PSR)

The Combat Organization (Russian: Боевая организация партии социалистов-революционеров, Boyevaya organizatsiya partii sotsialistov-revolyutsionerov, BO) was the terrorist wing of the Socialist Revolutionary Party (PSR) in the Russian Empire, active from 1902 to 1907. Established by the PSR Central Committee, its primary purpose was to carry out political assassinations against high-ranking government officials to destabilize the Tsarist regime and further the party's revolutionary aims.

Led by figures such as Grigory Gershuni, Boris Savinkov, and, notoriously, the Okhrana agent Yevno Azef, the Combat Organization operated with a high degree of autonomy and secrecy. Its members, often driven by a mix of revolutionary idealism and personal motivations, were responsible for some of the most sensational political assassinations of the early 20th century, including those of Interior Ministers Dmitry Sipyagin (1902) and Vyacheslav von Plehve (1904), and Grand Duke Sergei Alexandrovich (1905).

The organization's activities were significantly impacted by internal dynamics, police infiltration, and shifts in PSR party policy regarding the use of terror. The exposure of Azef as a police agent in 1908 dealt a devastating blow to the Combat Organization and the PSR, leading to a sharp decline in its activities and a crisis of confidence within the revolutionary movement. Despite attempts to revive its operations, the Combat Organization largely ceased to function effectively after Azef's exposure, though isolated acts attributed to its legacy or attempts at revival continued until around 1911.

== Formation and ideology ==
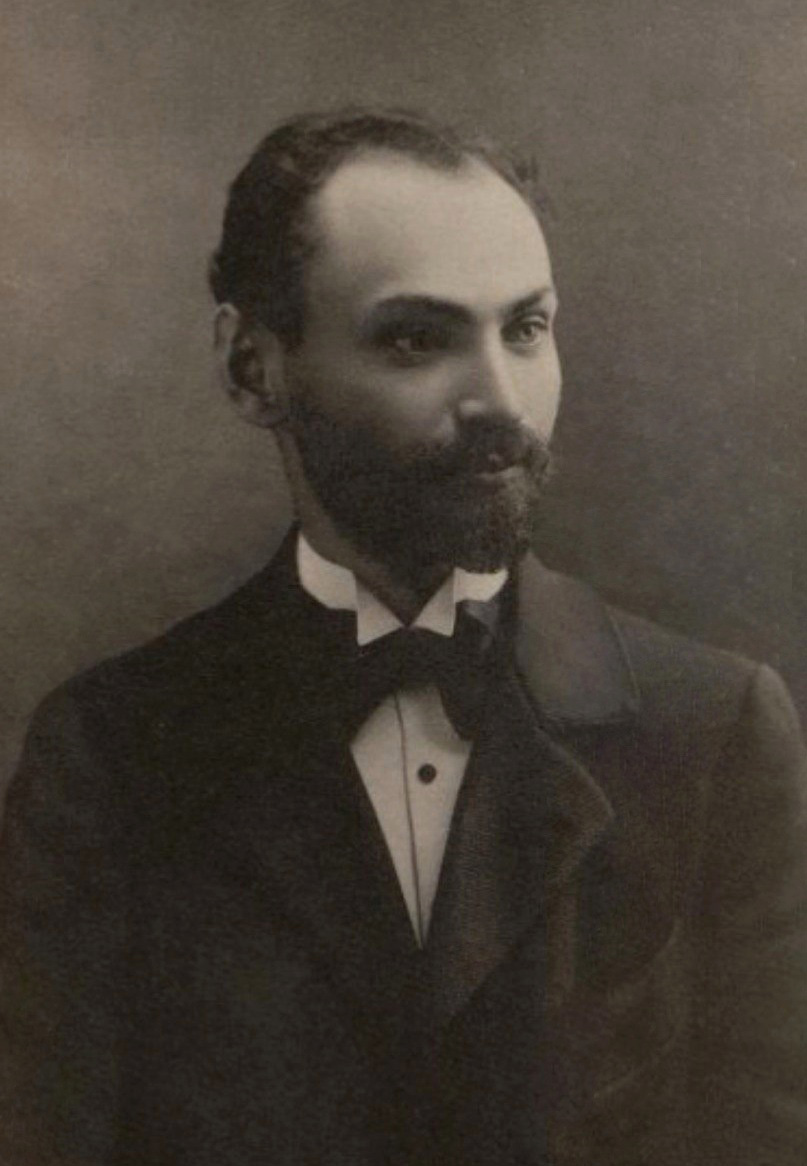
Grigory Gershuni, founder and first leader of the Combat Organization

The Combat Organization was established by Grigory Gershuni in late 1901 to serve as a specialized terrorist unit for the Socialist Revolutionary Party (PSR) in the Russian Empire. Gershuni created the BO without formal authority from the party, using it to "roll over" the anti-terrorist opposition. The core conviction behind its creation was that success in terrorist activities depended on specialized cadres dedicated exclusively to combat and operating in strictest secrecy. This led to such complete isolation from the rest of the party that most prominent PSR members "had absolutely no idea of what was going on in the Combat Organization", and some even doubted its existence. The Central Committee initially had no right to interfere in its internal affairs, and civilian PSR leaders, often personally reluctant to participate in violence, like Viktor Chernov, made no attempt to change this as long as the combatants (boeviki) brought glory to the party through sensational terrorist acts. This marked a departure from the structure of earlier revolutionary groups like the Narodnaya Volya (People's Will), where theoreticians, organizers, and terrorists were often the same individuals involved in all aspects of party activity.

The BO inherited its theoretical justification for terror from Narodnaya Volya, which viewed it as a legitimate tactic for an isolated revolutionary elite to destabilize the regime and demonstrate a path to struggle. The PSR's justification, articulated by Gershuni, was that in the face of Tsarist oppression, "we, the conscious minority, hold it to be not only our right but our holy duty...to answer violence with violence". The BO's terror was designed to be personal—a "duel" against individual state officials to maintain a clear moral distinction—rather than indiscriminate. Its official functions were threefold: to defend revolutionaries ("self-defense"), to agitate the masses and "awaken the most indifferent", and to disorganize the state. As a result of their conspiratorial work and secluded lifestyle, members of the Combat Organization developed their own values and a strong elitist esprit de corps, where solidarity among themselves ranked higher than loyalty to the party. They gradually became a sect whose members saw themselves as the "true bearers of Russia's revolutionary cross". Under Gershuni's influence, the justification for terror shifted from sober political calculation toward an emphasis on moral and ethical considerations. Terrorist activity became a "matter of honor", a duty to one's own "dignity", and an act of "revenge". A distinct irrationalism and quasi-religious ideals entered the rationale, with terrorism framed as a "holy act" and an "act of redemption", and the terrorist's "act of killing" required to be an "act of self-sacrifice".

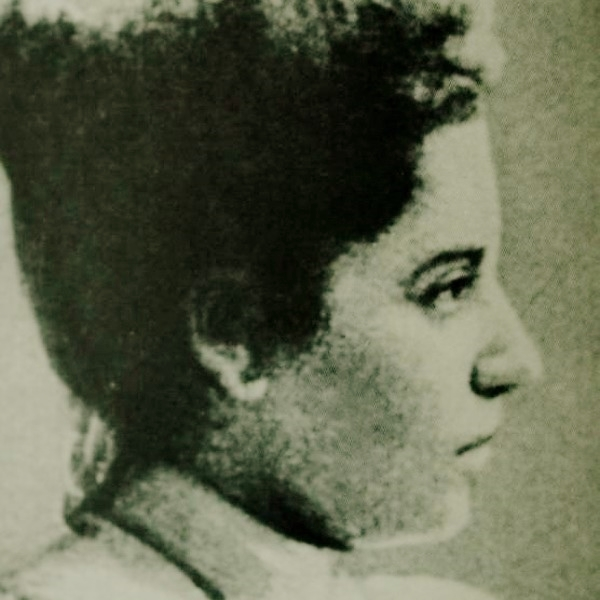
Dora Brilliant

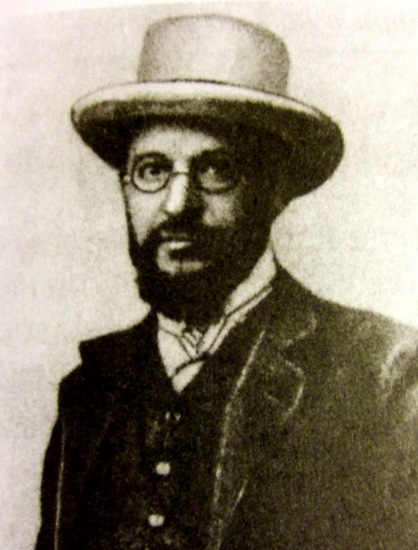
Abram Gots

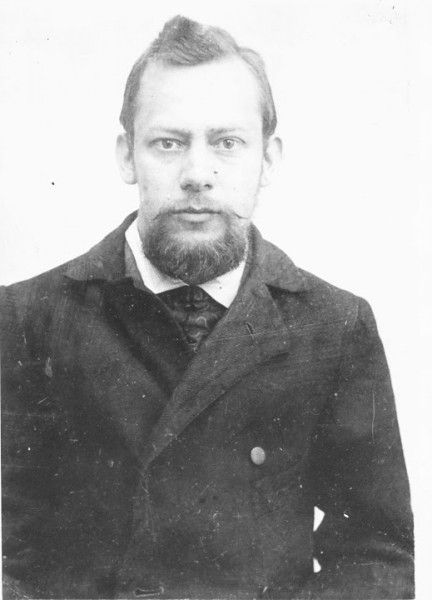
Ivan Kalyayev

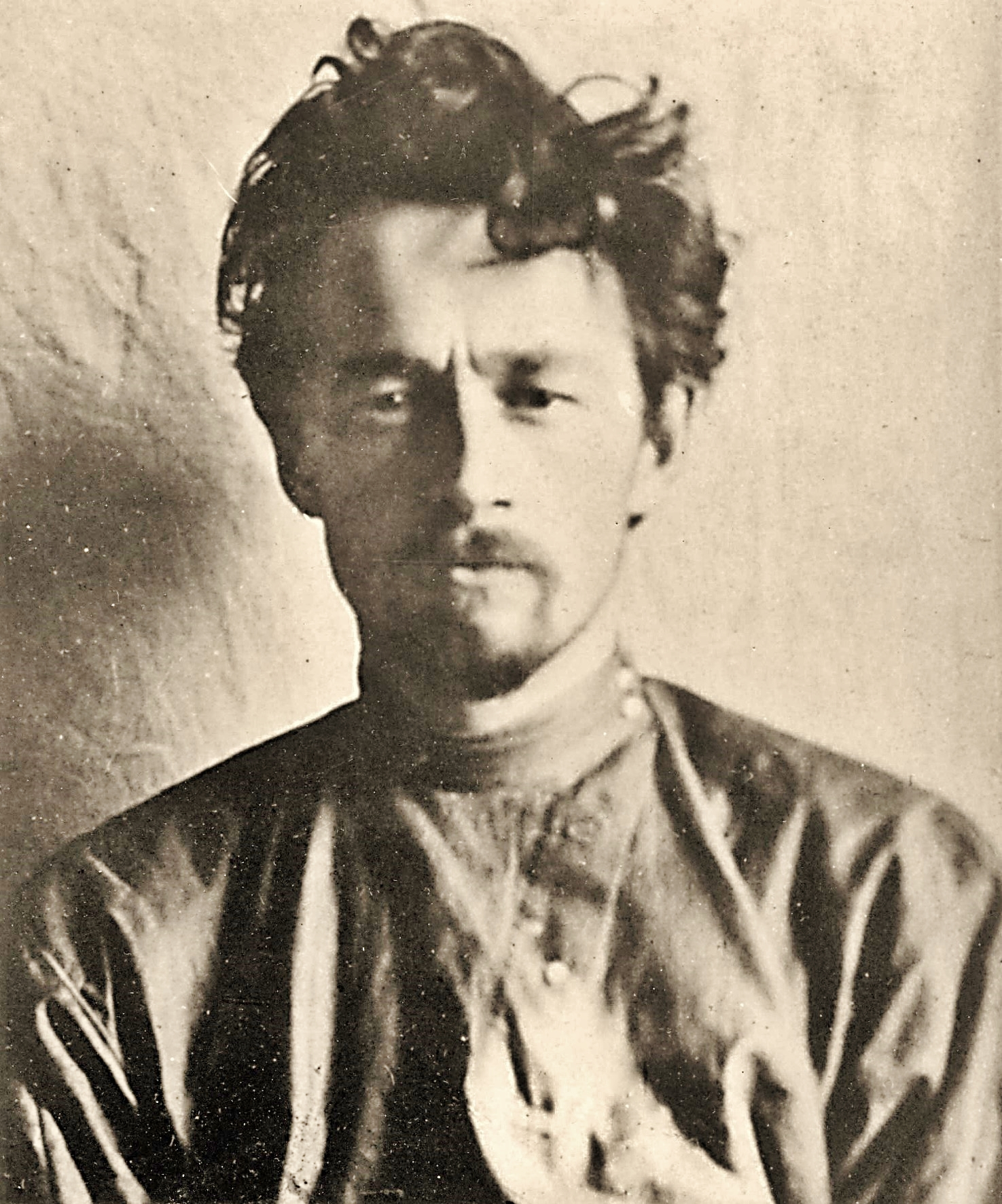
Yegor Sazonov

The organization's ideology, or lack thereof, was also reflected in its leadership and membership. Many rank-and-file terrorists were even less inclined to adhere to Socialist-Revolutionary ideology than the leaders. For example, Fedor Nazarov was a convinced anarchist, and Dora Brilliant "was not interested in programmatic questions ... [with] terror personifying the revolution for her". Abram Gots was a follower of Immanuel Kant, and Mariia Benevskaia an ardent Christian. Ivan Kaliaev, known as "the poet", composed prayers, and Yegor Sazonov explained his actions in religious terms, seeing socialist work as a continuation of Christ's mission. The organization's congenial atmosphere and solidarity were thus based not on shared ideological precepts but on a "deep need shared by nonconformists... to consolidate within a small circle their 'psychological identity at a time of great societal instability and flux.'" This group cohesion was magnified by external danger, leading members to submerge their own identities into a "group mind".

The PSR Central Committee, contrary to its own theoretical principles which described terrorism as only a supporting tool for mass struggle, came to treat central terror as the most important aspect of the party's work. This was evident in funding, where the Combat Organization was denied nothing; if funds were short, other activities were cut, but "never on combat affairs". The organization had full control over its own independent treasury, further increasing its autonomy, and it planned and executed terrorist acts without consulting the Central Committee, ostensibly to maintain conspiracy but also because they considered such matters beyond the competence of those not directly involved. The combatants quickly "adopted the arrogant view that it was they who accomplished the truly revolutionary deeds".

== Leadership ==
The Combat Organization had three primary leaders during its existence:

- Grigory Gershuni was a founder of the PSR and the chief initiator of the Combat Organization's early acts. A former pharmacist, he was considered by police an "artist in terror" and by radicals the "tiger of the Revolution". Gershuni never personally used arms but possessed, according to former Okhrana official Alexander Spiridovich, an "incredible gift to take hold of... the inexperienced, easily carried-away youth" through his "hypnotizing eyes and especially persuasive speech". Fellow revolutionaries considered him a "soul hunter", comparable to Mephistopheles, and some considered him the "PSR's Lenin" for his organizational talents. After his arrest in May 1903, he was sentenced to death but his sentence was commuted to life at hard labor, an act some party members considered fainthearted. He escaped from Siberia in 1906 and died of tuberculosis in 1908.

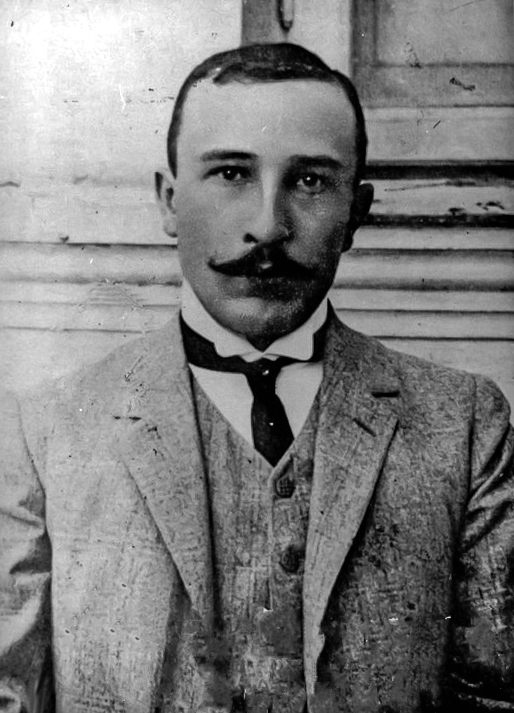
Boris Savinkov

- Boris Savinkov succeeded Gershuni as organizer and commander in May 1903. The son of a judge, Savinkov was well-educated and handsome, but showed profound indifference to socialist dogma and theoretical issues. His revolutionary career shifted exclusively to the immediate goals of political assassinations. One SR acquaintance described him as having "deep social indifference and increasing egocentrism", being a "thrill-seeking adventurer". His novel, The Pale Horse (Kon' blednyi), is considered a personal statement revealing aspects of his complex personality and a "savage demystification of the monolithic hero" type. Despite this, Savinkov possessed personal courage and was a gifted organizer, leading the Combat Organization during its most spectacular successes.
- Yevno Azef was an enigmatic figure who was exposed in 1908 as a long-time police agent. He never concealed his skepticism about socialist dogma and openly proclaimed he would remain in the party only until a constitutional order was established in Russia, earning him the mocking title "Kadet with terror" (kadet s terrorom). Azef played a prominent role in the PSR from its early days, becoming a fully empowered member of the Central Committee in 1906 and serving as the primary link between the Central Committee and the Combat Organization. At one point in autumn 1907, he was its temporary head.

== Operations ==
=== Early phase (1902–1903) ===
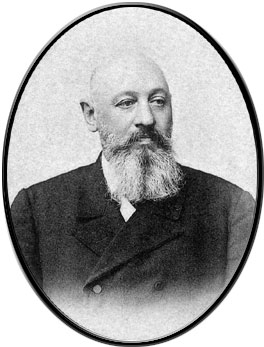
Dmitry Sipyagin

The Combat Organization's first terrorist act was the assassination of the Minister of the Interior, Dmitry Sipyagin, on 2 April 1902 in Saint Petersburg. Stepan Balmashev, dressed in an aide-de-camp's uniform, shot Sipyagin point-blank in the Mariinsky Palace. This act demonstrated the perpetrators' disregard for the theoretical principle that terror was auxiliary to mass mobilization and highlighted their alienation from the party, as the PSR Central Committee formally adopted this independent action as a party deed and declared the Combat Organization part of the PSR only after its success.

This initial victory opened the SR terrorist campaign. On 29 July 1902, Foma Kachura, a woodworker, attempted to assassinate Prince Ivan Obolenskii, governor of Kharkov, wounding the city's chief of police instead. Gershuni had chosen Kachura for his worker status to lend ideological significance to the act and dictated the letter Kachura was to present. On 6 May 1903, Egor Dulebov assassinated Nikolay Bogdanovich, governor of the Ufa province. The assassins managed to escape.

=== Peak activity under Savinkov (1904–1905) ===
After Gershuni's arrest in May 1903, Boris Savinkov became the leader. During this period, the organization focused on developing its technical capabilities, particularly bomb-making. This was dangerous work for the dilettantes involved. Aleksei Pokotilov died on 31 March 1904 while assembling bombs in the Northern Hotel in St. Petersburg. Maximilian Shveitser met a similar fate on 26 February 1905 in the Hotel Bristol. Both explosions caused enormous damage. Under Savinkov's command, the Combat Organization executed two of its most spectacular acts:

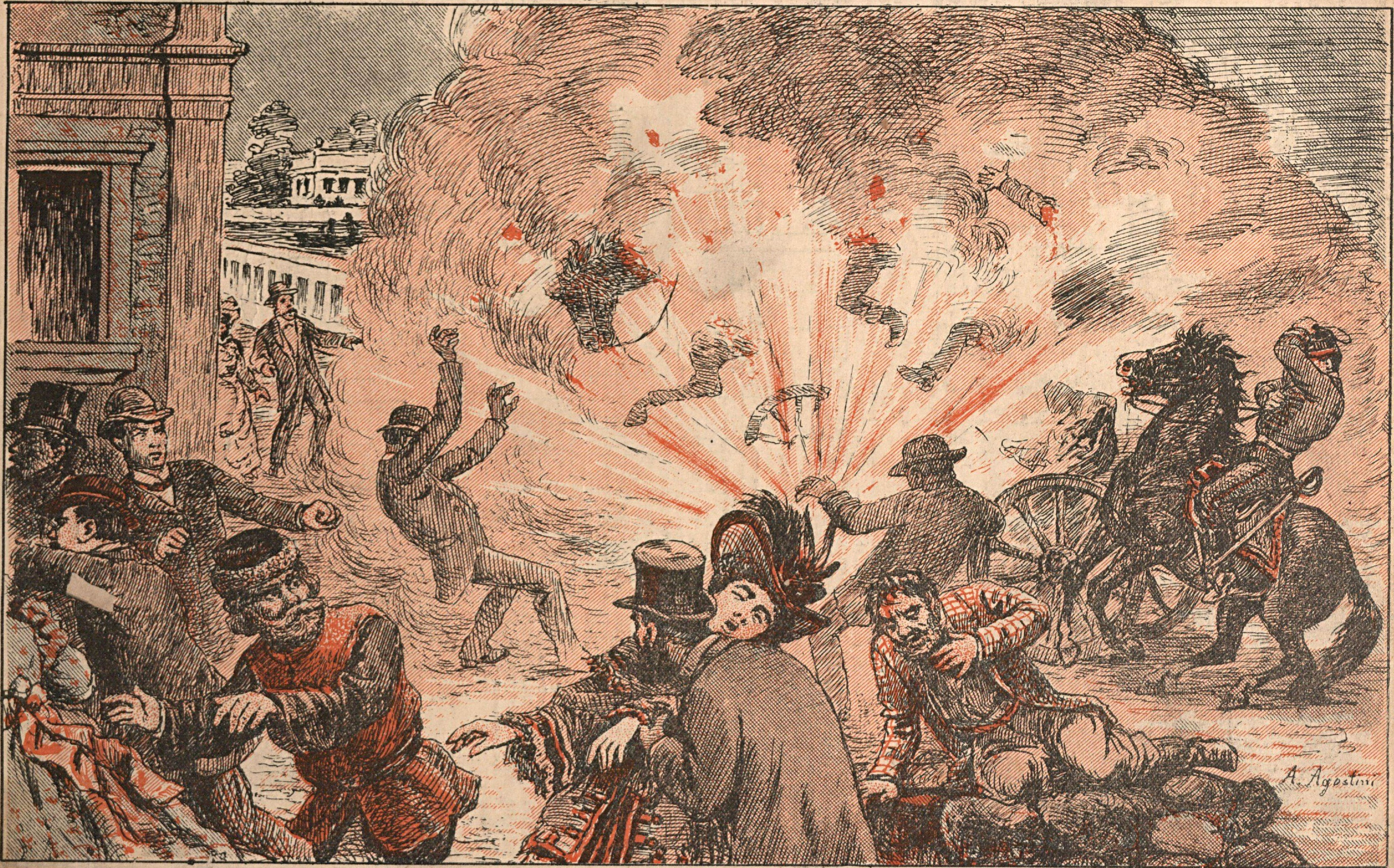
Depiction of Vyacheslav von Plehve's assassination

- The assassination of Minister of the Interior Vyacheslav von Plehve on 15 July 1904. Yegor Sazonov threw a bomb into Plehve's carriage, killing him instantly and seriously injuring Sazonov. This act, long regarded as a "question of honor for the party", tremendously enhanced the prestige of the Combat Organization.

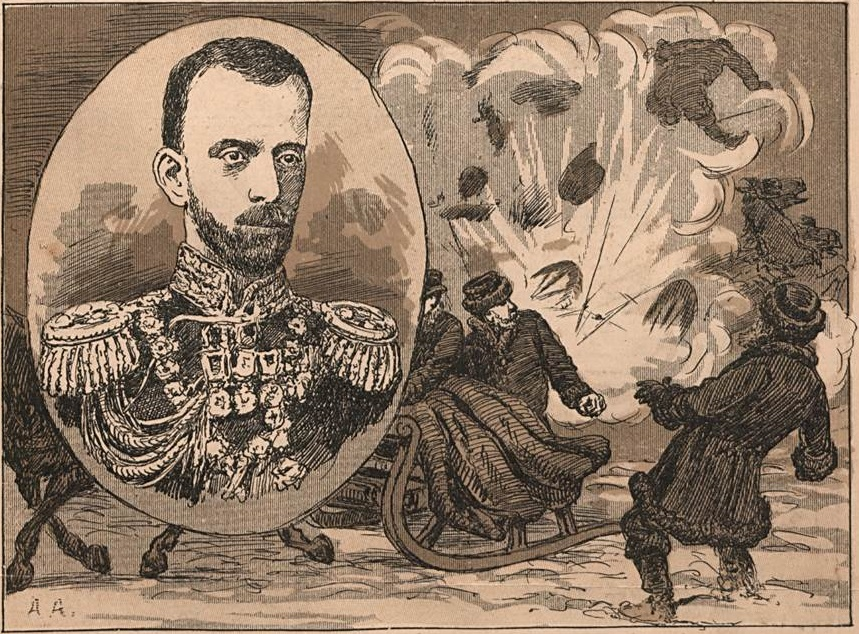
Depiction of Grand Duke Sergei Alexandrovich's assassination

- The assassination of Grand Duke Sergei Alexandrovich, governor-general of Moscow and uncle of the Tsar, on 4 February 1905. Ivan Kaliaev, a close friend of Savinkov, hurled a large homemade bomb that killed the Grand Duke. The explosion was so powerful it was heard in remote corners of Moscow. Kaliaev was also injured, arrested, tried, and hanged. This was the first assassination of a Romanov family member since 1881. Kaliaev's hesitation to throw the bomb on an earlier occasion because the Grand Duke's wife and children were in the carriage fascinated contemporaries and became a classic illustration of the ethical problem of using violence for political ends.

During this period, the organization also planned other attacks. An attempt on Minister of Justice Nikolay Murav'ev on 19 January 1905 failed. A plot to assassinate Tsar Nicholas II by Tat'iana Leont'eva, a dedicated but emotionally unstable terrorist, was aborted when a ball the Tsar was to attend was cancelled. Leont'eva had proposed the assassination, and the terrorists, including Savinkov, enthusiastically approved without waiting for party leadership consent, highlighting their insubordination.

These two major successes brought "plenty of money and no shortage of candidates to the Combat Organization". However, they marked the end of its "heroic period".

=== Decline and attempted revival (1905–1907) ===
In March 1905, police, acting on information from SR agent Nikolai Tatarov, arrested seventeen members of the Combat Organization. According to Savinkov, "never again did it achieve such strength and such significance". Savinkov, with the remaining boeviki like Dora Brilliant, planned an assassination of General Dmitri Trepov in St. Petersburg, but constant police surveillance forced its abandonment. Plots against Grand Duke Vladimir Alexandrovich (held responsible for Bloody Sunday), General Nikolai Kleigels (governor-general of Kiev), and Baron Paul Simon Unterberger (governor of Nizhnii Novgorod) also produced no results. When Nicholas II issued the October Manifesto, the PSR Central Committee, despite protests from the Combat Organization and provincial boeviki, ordered a halt to terrorist activity. The Combat Organization subsequently "disintegrated", with most terrorists dispersing to the provinces. However, Savinkov and other dedicated advocates of terror were not ready to comply. He nurtured fantastic plans, including arresting Count Sergei Witte, bombing the St. Petersburg Okhrana section, and destroying all electrical and telephone lines in the capital, though none materialized.

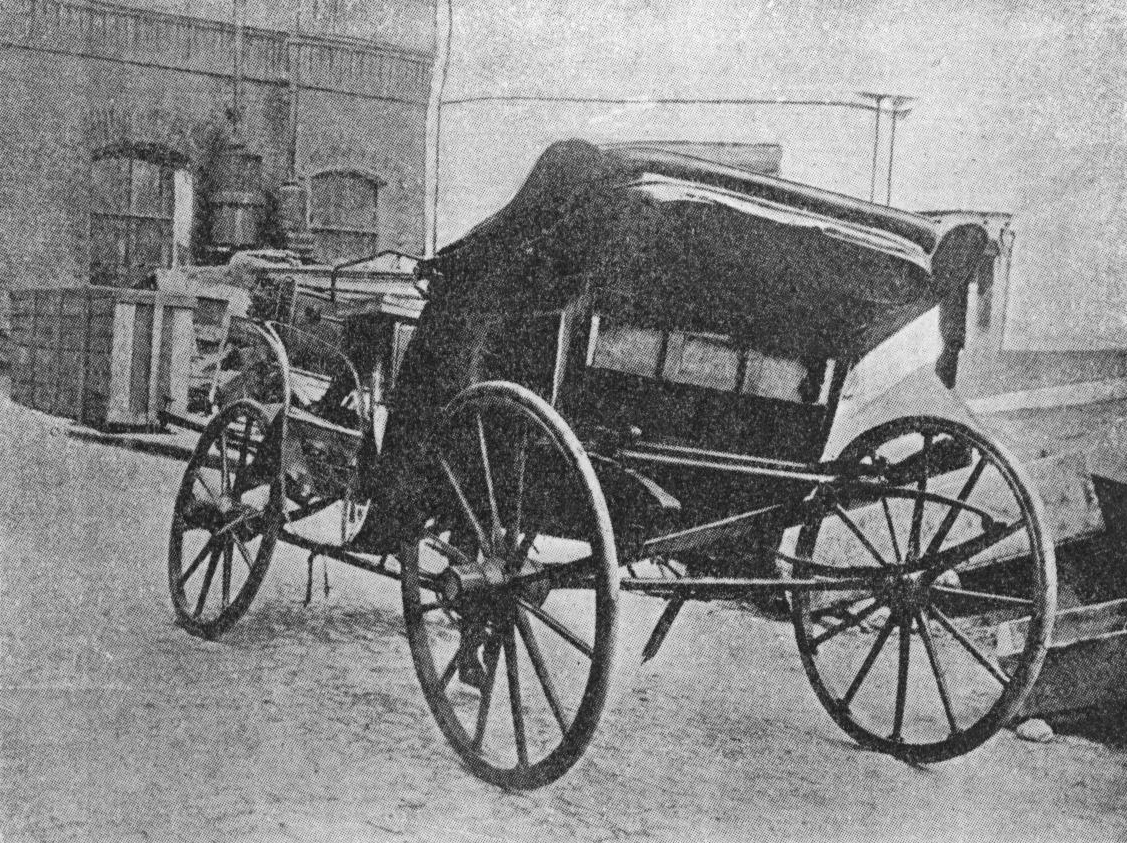
Fyodor Dubasov's carriage after the failed assassination attempt

Following the suppression of the Moscow uprising in December 1905, the new Central Committee elected at the First PSR Congress (December 1905–January 1906) declared its intention to resume terrorist activities. The Combat Organization was to be rebuilt with about thirty new members. Its primary targets were Minister of the Interior Pyotr Durnovo and Vice Admiral Fyodor Dubasov, governor-general of Moscow, with both acts planned before the opening of the First Duma. Except for a revenge killing of the police informer Tatarov in Warsaw on 4 April 1906, the attack on Dubasov was the Combat Organization's final, albeit partial, success. On 23 April 1906, Boris Vnorovskii, dressed as a naval officer, threw a bomb disguised as a box of candies under Dubasov's carriage. Vnorovskii and Dubasov's aide-de-camp were killed instantly; the governor-general was thrown from his carriage and escaped with minor injuries.

With the opening of the First Duma on 27 April 1906, the PSR Central Committee, despite boycotting the elections, reaffirmed its intention to end terrorist activity. This indirectly saved Durnovo. The Combat Organization also failed to assassinate Minister of Justice Mikhail Akimov and military figures General Georgii Min and Colonel Riman. These repeated failures, especially after the March 1905 arrests, led many party members to question the conduct of central terror.

Following the dissolution of the First Duma in July 1906, the Central Committee again resumed terror, with Prime Minister Pyotr Stolypin as the primary target. Persistent plotting against Stolypin failed, largely due to the difficulty of approaching him. An almost desperate Savinkov then attempted to assassinate Vladimir von der Launits, governor of St. Petersburg, but this also proved impossible due to constant police surveillance. Savinkov resigned as head of the combatants, along with Azef (then the PSR Central Committee representative in the Combat Organization). The Central Committee appointed SRs Sletov and Grozdov as replacements, but the boeviki, consistent with their closed-circle mentality, refused to recognize these outsiders and chose to disperse. By the beginning of 1907, the Combat Organization had fallen apart again, this time for good in its former capacity.

== The Azef affair ==
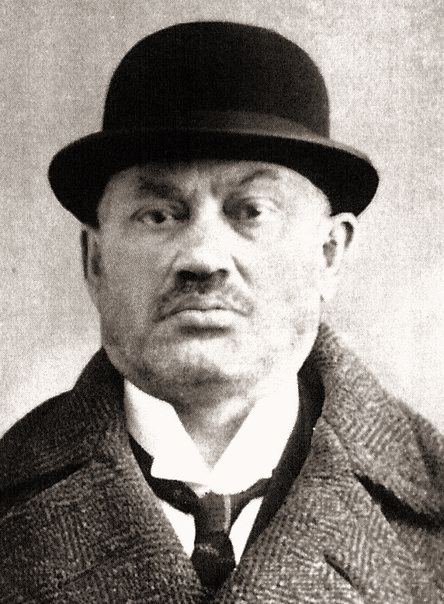
Yevno Azef

Yevno Azef, a prominent figure in the Combat Organization and the PSR Central Committee, was exposed as a police agent in 1908. Azef had offered his services to the Police Department in 1892 while studying in Germany. He rose through the revolutionary ranks, providing firsthand information to the Okhrana on PSR activities, including the plans of the Combat Organization. For his nearly fifteen years of service, he received a substantial police salary, reaching one thousand rubles monthly by the end.

Suspicions about Azef had surfaced on several occasions but were dismissed due to his high standing. In May 1908, revolutionary historian Vladimir Burtsev formally notified the PSR Central Committee of his belief that Azef was a police spy. Burtsev's persistence, coupled with the testimony of retired Police Department director Aleksei Lopukhin, led to a formal SR investigation. The results were devastating for the party's prestige. On 26 December 1908, the PSR Central Committee publicly revealed Azef's police connections, and in January 1909, listed terrorist acts in which Azef had allegedly played an initiating role, declaring him an agent provocateur. Azef, given an opportunity to acquit himself, used it to disappear and spent years as a fugitive from SR vengeance.

The Azef affair "caused the party incalculable harm", primarily because the reputation of Russia's foremost terrorist organization was hopelessly discredited. The scandal "shook the PSR to its foundations", and the SR leadership's attempts to blame the government for using illegal methods of investigation did little to restore their respect and prestige, even among their own followers. The scandal led to widespread demoralization, panic, depression, and extreme pessimism, particularly among SR terrorist cadres and within the party's St. Petersburg organization. It also had a profound effect on revolutionary circles outside the PSR, with many former proponents of combat methods renouncing terrorism and centralized conspiracy, now seeing a connection between "Azefshchina and the 'general crisis of the revolution'". The affair largely discredited terrorist tactics in the eyes of many former advocates, and political murder lost its romantic aura in the eyes of liberal public opinion.

== Final years and legacy ==
Even after the 1907 collapse of the main Combat Organization, SR-affiliated terrorist activity continued through other channels. The PSR leadership relied on smaller "flying combat detachments" (letuchie boevye otriady) and isolated individuals. One of the most active of these was the Northern Flying Combat Detachment, which operated in St. Petersburg. Though not officially subordinate to the Central Committee, it carried out the assassination of General Min on 13 August 1906. This group, led by the Latvian Al'bert Trauberg, also planned indiscriminate mass killings, including an attack on the State Council. In February 1908, nine members of the detachment were arrested, one of whom, Mario Kal'vino, was outfitted as a living bomb to assassinate Minister of Justice Ivan Shcheglovitov. Seven of the arrested were subsequently executed. Another group, the Combat Detachment of the Central Committee, led by Lev Zil'berberg, was intended as a replacement for the original BO. It carried out the assassination of von der Launits on 3 January 1907 and planned further attacks, including on the Tsar himself, before Zil'berberg's capture in February 1907.

After the Azef affair, Boris Savinkov, with the sanction of the Central Committee, attempted in 1909 to resurrect the Combat Organization and "purify its honor with a new terrorist campaign", aiming to assassinate the Tsar. These efforts produced no results, primarily because three of his ten or twelve recruits turned out to be police agents. Independent SR terrorist groups continued to form abroad and in peripheral areas, sometimes cooperating with Maximalists. Some leading émigré party members supported a new phase of local terror against government officials and bourgeois citizens, raising funds for terrorist enterprises, including acts of vengeance inside Tsarist prisons. Two such assaults occurred in 1911: a 15 April attempt on Vologda Prison Inspector Efimov and an 18 August attack on Vysotskii, head of the Zerentui hard labor prison in Siberia.

The Combat Organization's legacy is complex. It was responsible for numerous high-profile assassinations that significantly impacted Russian politics. The post-Azef crisis forced the PSR into a deep reevaluation of its tactics. The party's right wing, the Pochintsy, argued that the era of conspiratorial terror was over and that the party must adapt to legal and semi-legal forms of struggle, such as those in trade unions and cooperatives. This group advocated for a suspension of terror, arguing that it had become anachronistic in a society where class lines, not just autocratic officials, defined the political struggle. This debate ultimately proved that the romantic period of individual terror as a central revolutionary method had ended, a conclusion confirmed by the failure of the Combat Organization to revive itself and the broader decline of the PSR's influence.

== See also ==
- Terrorism in Russia
- Bolshevik Military Organizations
- PSP Combat organization
- The Just Assassins
