= Yegor Sazonov =

Russian revolutionary (1879–1910)

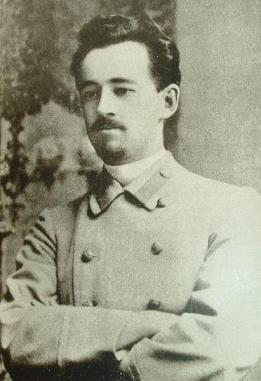
- Yegor Sazonov (undated)
- Born: Yegor Sergeevich Sazonov; June 7, 1879; Petrovskoe, Vyatka Governorate, Russian Empire
- Died: December 10, 1910 (aged 31); Zabaikalskaya Oblast, Russian Empire
- Education: Imperial Moscow University Faculty of Medicine
- Occupations: professional revolutionary, cab driver (cover)
- Years active: 1901–1910
- Employer: Socialist-Revolutionary Party's Terrorist Brigade (Combat Organization)
- Known for: assassination of Vyacheslav von Plehve
- Political party: Socialist-Revolutionary Party
- Criminal charges: murder
- Criminal penalty: imprisonment

Yegor Sergeyevich Sazonov or Sozonov (Russian: Его́р Серге́евич Созо́нов; 7 June [O.S. 23 May] 1879 – 10 December [O.S. 27 November] 1910) was a Russian revolutionary and a member of the Terrorist Brigade or SR Combat Organization who threw the bomb that assassinated Russian Minister of the Interior Vyacheslav von Plehve in 1904.

== Background ==
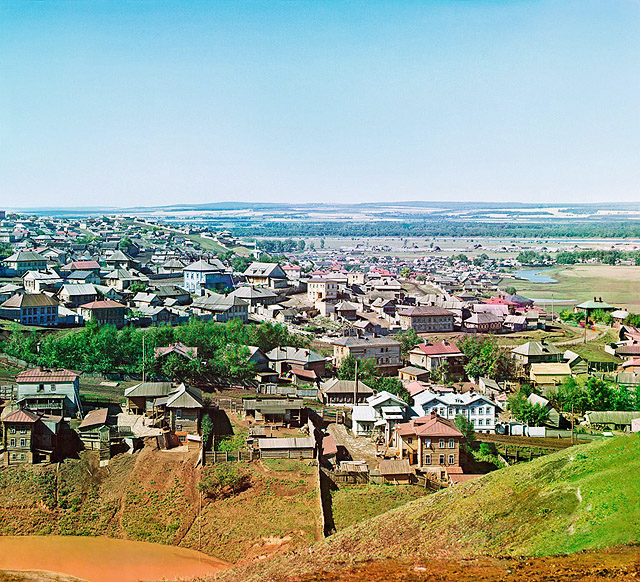
Sazonov grew up in Ufa (here, in 1910), also site of his first exile (from the Sergei Mikhailovich Prokudin-Gorskii Collection at the Library of Congress)

Yegor Sergeevich Sazonov was born on June 7 [O.S. May 26] 1879, in Petrovskoe, Urzhumsky Uyezd, Vyatka Governorate. His father was a wealthy timber merchant of the Old Believer faith in Ufa.

== Career ==
Sazonov was initially deeply religious and monarchist as a student, wanting to become a doctor. Sazonov studied at the Ufa boys' gymnasium. In 1901, he entered the Faculty of Medicine of the Imperial Moscow University, where he helped organize a student protest against the decision of the university, which expelled 183 students for anti-tsarist activities.

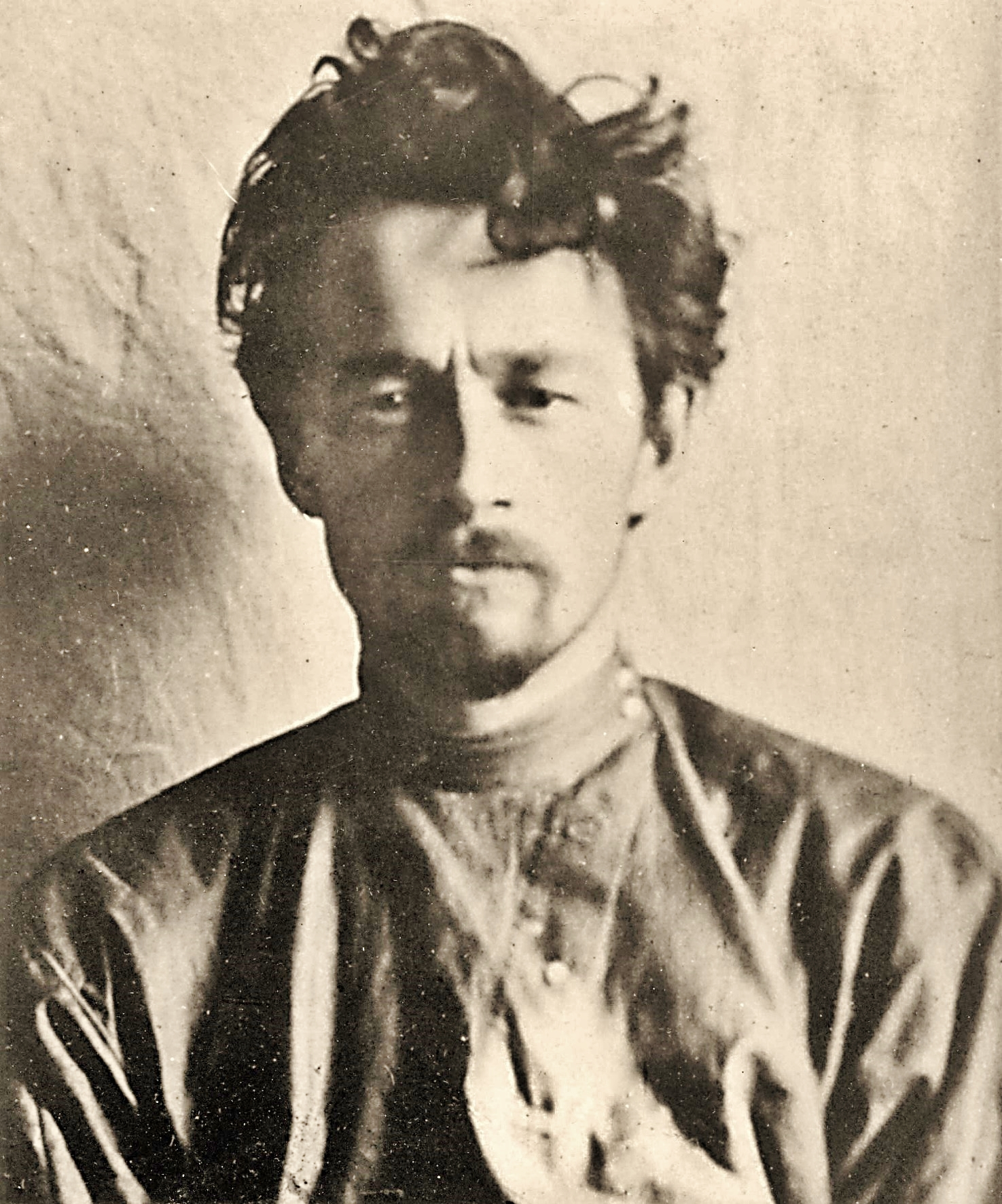
Sazonov after his first arrest (1902)

=== Socialist Revolutionary party ===
After being arrested, flogged, and expelled, Sazonov joined the Socialist Revolutionary Party, organized studies of socialism, and turned against the government. He said "It is not easy to reject the fundamental laws of humanity, but I have been forced to it. From now on I dedicate myself to open warfare with the government..."

After his expulsion, Sazonov was sent to exile in Ufa, where he started to study socialist and democratic literature. At the behest of his father he was released and later joined the Ural Union of Social Democrats and Socialist Revolutionaries. Shortly after he was once again arrested and thus was exiled to Siberia.

On March 16 (29), 1902, the police broke into his family's apartment with a search warrant. Sazonov had time to tear some sheets from his personal notebook and chew them, only to realize that in his haste he had destroyed the wrong pages. The police thus found the evidence of the existence in the city of clandestine activity coordinated by the Union. He was held in the Ufa prison where he went on a hunger strike and later transferred to Yakutsk. In July 1903, on his way to Eastern Siberia, Sazonov fled and left for Switzerland.

=== Terrorist Brigade ===
Abroad, Sazonov finally joined the Terrorist Bridge or Combat Organization of the Socialist-Revolutionary Party. With a fake passport and using a false name, he returned to Russia. The leaders of the Terrorist Brigade were Yevno Azef (a double agent and agent-provocateur working for the Russian secret police), Grigory Gershuni, and Boris Savinkov. Sazonov learned the trade of cab-driver in St. Petersburg.

=== Assassination of von Plehve ===
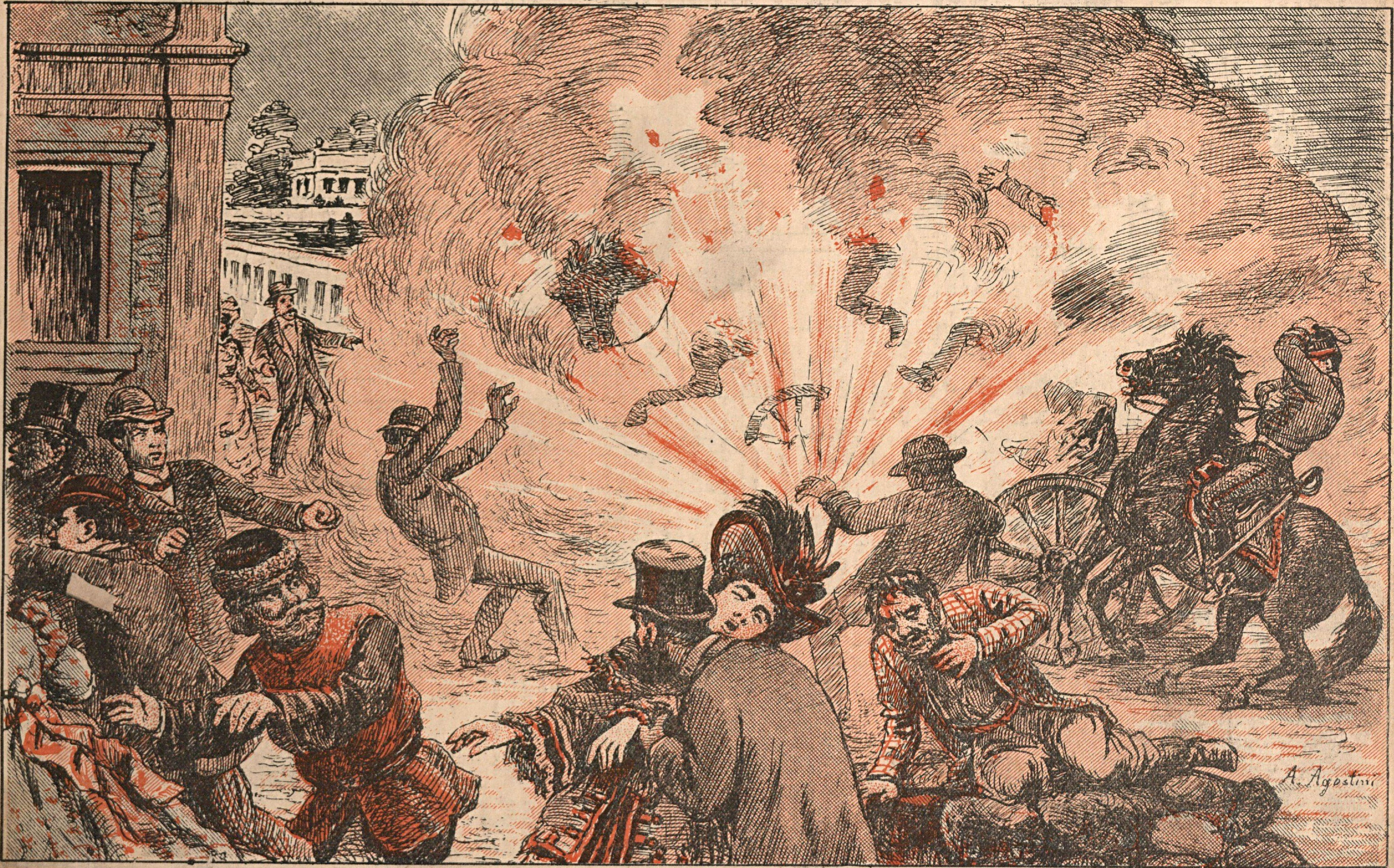
Assassination of Vyacheslav von Plehve by Sazonov and fellow members of the Terrorist Brigade

Vyacheslav von Plehve, Minister of Interior, known for his ruthlessness, had already approved of the brutal suppression of many workers's strikes. After the massacre of the Zlatoust miners (which left over sixty dead) and Plehve's approval of that measure (taken by the Governor of Ufa, Nikolai Bogdanovich), Gershuni, then head of the SR Combat Organization, targeted von Plehve for assassination. Under Azef, Gershuni sent Sazonov, Lev Sikorsky, Abram Borishansky, and Ivan Kalyayev to carry out the plan.

The assassination took place at Ismailovsky Prospekt in St. Petersburg, on July 15, 1904. The terrorists used seven-kilogram bombs, made by a local professor named Rouher. Two other assassins, Sikorski and Kalyayev, did not use their bombs. Sazonov succeeded in throwing his bomb under von Plehve's carriage. The bomb killed the minister instantly and wounded Sazonov, who was immediately arrested and beaten severely by the police. After assassinating Von Plehve, when asked by another revolutionary how he felt, Sazonov responded, "Pride and joy... only that."

Sazonov was deprived of all rights and assigned to indefinite detention in a convict prison and was imprisoned in the Shlisselburg Fortress. Then he was transferred to the Butyrka prison, from where he was sent to the Nerchinsk mines for forced labor. The amnesty of 1905 limited Sozonov's stay in hard labor for a certain period.

== Death ==
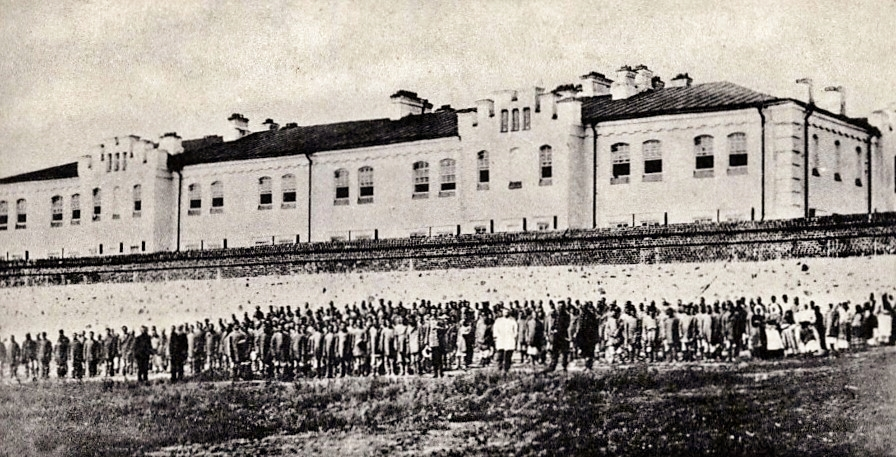
Gorny Zerentui prison, where Sazonov committed suicide

At the end of 1907, he was transferred to the Zerentui convict prison. The new head of the prison, I. Vysotsky, treated political prisoners like common criminals and extended corporal punishment to them. Having found fault for an insignificant reason, he ordered that political prisoners be flogged.

On December 10 [O. S. November 27] 1910, Sazonov committed suicide in a prison in Gorny Zerentui, Trans-Baikal region, "in protest [of] the cruel prison regime in the men's prisons of Nerchinsk," followed by mass protest at the prison. Sources differ on his caused of death, which include poison and self-immolation by kerosene.

== Legacy ==
Sazonov was initially buried at his place of death, but after the February Revolution, on May 25, 1917, his ashes were brought to Ufa. The reburial took place at the Sergievsky cemetery. A monument was erected on the grave in 1917.

Sazonov was treated as a hero to Jewish and Russian communities in the United States. He received so much applause that the Chicago Daily News said that "the Cubs should hire him as a pitcher."

In his 1911 novel Under Western Eyes, Joseph Conrad may have modeled the character "Victor Haldin" after Sazonov.

In 1923, his superior Boris Savinkov, when accused of terrorism against the Soviet Union, defended himself by saying he was too revolutionary to be accused, because he was once a "comrade of Yegor Sazonov."

Before his own death in 1941, Victor Serge wrote about Sazonov in Memoirs of a Revolutionary, 1901-1941, published posthumously in 1963.

In his 1952 memoir Witness, Whittaker Chambers named Sazonov as one of three people whom he most admired as he joined the CPUSA, along with Felix Djerjinsky and Eugen Leviné:

The Russian was not a Communist. He was a pre-Communist revolutionist named Kalyaev. (I should have said Sazonov.) He was arrested for a minor part in the assassination of the Tsarist prime minister, von Plehve. He was sent into Siberian exile to one of the worst prison camps, where the political prisoners were flogged. Kalyaev sought some way to protest this outrage to the world. The means were few, but at last he found a way. In protest against the flogging of other men, Kalyaev drenched himself in kerosene, set himself on fire and burned himself to death. That also is what it meant to be a Communist.

Between 1958 and 1968 while living in the GULAG, Aleksandr Solzhenitsyn wrote about Sazonov in his book The Gulag Archipelago.

== See also ==
- Yevno Azef
- Grigory Gershuni
- Boris Savinkov
- Ivan Kalyayev
