= Ivan Kalyayev =

Russian Empire poet and executed assassin (1877–1905)

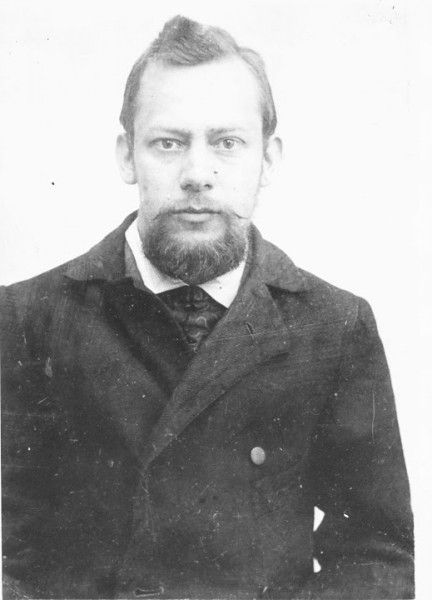
- Kaleyev c. 1900
- Born: Ivan Platonovich Kalyayev; 6 July 1877; Warsaw, Warsaw Governorate, Congress Poland, Russian Empire
- Died: 23 May 1905 (aged 27); Shlisselburg, Saint Petersburg Governorate, Russian Empire
- Cause of death: Execution by hanging
- Occupations: Poet, Socialist-Revolutionary Party member
- Known for: Assassinating Grand Duke Sergei Alexandrovich of Russia

Ivan Platonovich Kalyayev (Russian: Ива́н Плато́нович Каля́ев; 6 July 1877 – 23 May 1905) was a Russian poet, a member of the Socialist-Revolutionary Party. He is best known for his role in the assassination of Grand Duke Sergei Alexandrovich, which was an operation of the SR Combat Organization. Arrested at the scene, Kalyayev was convicted of murder and hanged.

== Early life ==
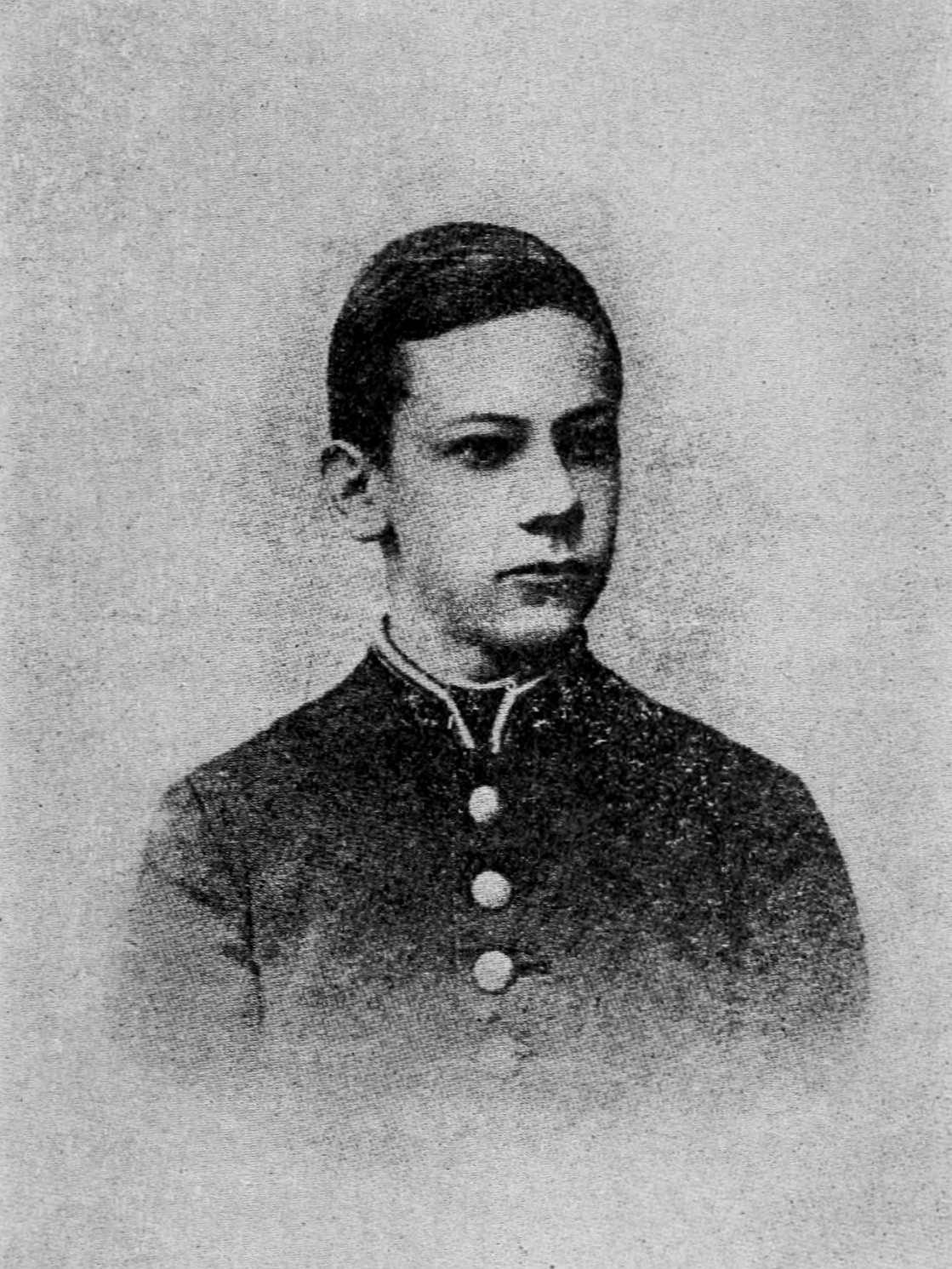
Kalyayev at the age of 18.

Kalyayev was born in Warsaw into the family of a Russian police inspector father Platon Kalyaev and a Polish mother Zofia Piotrowska who was the daughter of an impoverished nobleman. He attended Saint Petersburg University from (1897), but soon became involved in student protests, was briefly imprisoned, and then expelled from the University and sent into exile in Ekaterinoslav. Thereafter he tried to return to University, but was denied entrance due to his political activities. Kalyayev became a member of Vladimir Lenin's Union of Struggle for the Liberation of the Working Class and when he was 24, he joined the Russian Social Democratic Labour Party but soon broke with them, dissatisfied with what he considered "just talk", i.e. propaganda that did not lead to direct action. After serving his term he went to Lemberg (then in Austria-Hungary) to continue his education at Lemberg University, and became involved with the Russian émigré revolutionaries there. He was soon arrested in Berlin with revolutionary literature intended for Russia. The German government transferred Kalyayev to Russia. After a short imprisonment in Warsaw, Kalyayev was exiled to Yaroslavl.

== Bomber ==
In Yaroslavl, Kalyayev befriended the Socialist-Revolutionaries and writers Boris Savinkov and Aleksey Remizov, and decided to completely devote his life to revolutionary actions. At that time Kalyayev became convinced that political terror was the only way to realize his political ideas. He met Evno Azef, the commander of the SR Combat Organization and volunteered to perform political assassinations.

Kalyayev served as backup in the assassination of Interior Minister Vyacheslav Pleve. However, Pleve was killed by another member of the team, Yegor Sozonov, and Kalyayev did not ultimately need to use his bomb. The next to be killed was the General-Governor of Moscow and uncle of Tsar Nicholas II, Grand Duke Sergei Alexandrovich.

== Assassination of Grand Duke Sergei ==
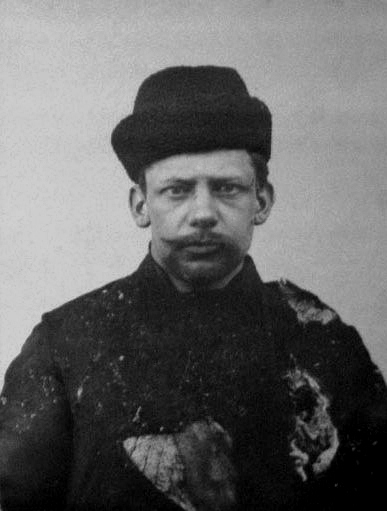
Photograph of Ivan Kalyayev taken just after the assassination. I threw the bomb from less than four steps. I was taken by the explosions, I saw the carriage flew to pieces...My overcoat was strewn with splinters of wood all around, it was torn and burnt, there was blood on my face...

The assassination was planned for 15 February 1905. On that day, the Duke was to visit a Bolshoi Theatre show that was a fundraiser for the Red Cross. Kalyayev was supposed to attack the carriage as it approached the theatre. Everything went as expected. Kalyaev was about to throw his bomb at the carriage of the Grand Duke, but he noticed that Sergei Alexandrovich's wife (Grand Duchess Elizabeth Fyodorovna) and young niece and nephew (children of the Grand Duke Pavel Alexandrovich) were also in the carriage, and he aborted the assassination.

He carried out the assassination two days later, killing the Grand Duke and his coachman as the Grand Duke was approaching his official residence in the Moscow Kremlin. Kalyayev was arrested immediately.

== Aftermath ==
According to Edvard Radzinsky,

"Elizabeth spent all the days before the burial in ceaseless prayer. On her husband's tombstone she wrote: 'Father, release them, they know not what they do.' She understood the words of the Gospels heart and soul, and on the eve of the funeral she demanded to be taken to the prison where Kalyayev was being held. Brought into his cell, she asked, 'Why did you kill my husband?' 'I killed Sergei Alexandrovich because he was a weapon of tyranny. I was taking revenge for the people.' 'Do not listen to your pride. Repent... and I will beg the Sovereign to give you your life. I will ask him for you. I myself have already forgiven you.' On the eve of revolution, she had already found a way out; forgiveness! Forgive through the impossible pain and blood -- and thereby stop it then, at the beginning, this bloody wheel. By her example, poor Ella appealed to society, calling upon the people to live in Christian faith. 'No!" replied Kalyayev. 'I do not repent. I must die for my deed and I will... My death will be more useful to my cause than Sergei Alexandrovich's death.' Kalyayev was sentenced to death. 'I am pleased with your sentence,' he told the judges. 'I hope that you will carry it out just as openly and publicly as I carried out the sentence of the Socialist Revolutionary Party. Learn to look the advancing revolution right in the face.'"

Kalyayev was hanged on 23 May 1905. This incident formed the basis for Albert Camus' 1949 play Les Justes.

== Poetry ==
Ivan Kalyayev was known to his friends by the nickname Poet and wrote several verses and prose. During his exile to Yaroslavl in 1902, Kalyayev, together with Aleksey Remizov, translated poems in prose by the Polish author Stanisław Przybyszewski. After his execution, the Socialist-Revolutionary Party published Kalyayev's book of poetry. His poetry was even included (without naming the author) in a popular reader. Today his works have been almost completely forgotten. A sample of Kalyayev's poetry is his Prayer.

== See also ==
- Boris Savinkov – another famous Russian terrorist and notable writer
- The Just Assassins (also translated The Just, French: Les Justes) – Albert Camus' play which retells the story of Kalyayev's assassination of Grand Duke Sergei and its aftermath.
