= Workers' Party for the Political Liberation of Russia =

Russian political party

Workers' Party for the Political Liberation of Russia Рабочая партия политического освобождения России
- Abbreviation: RPPOR
- Founded: 1899
- Dissolved: January 1902
- Merged into: Socialist Revolutionary Party
- Headquarters: Minsk
- Ideology: Neo-Narodism; Revolutionary socialism Russian Jews interests
- Political position: Far-left

The Workers' Party for the Political Liberation of Russia (Russian: Рабочая партия политического освобождения России, Rabochaya partiya politicheskogo osvobozhdeniyat rossii, abbreviated 'РППОР', RPPOR) was a political party in Russia, founded in 1899. The membership of the party included Grigory Gershuni and Catherine Breshkovsky (who would become two of the key architects of the Socialist Revolutionary Party) and its membership was predominantly Jewish. The party had its roots in a Minsk workers' study circle founded in 1895. In 1899 the group had around sixty members. The party directed most of its agitation towards Jewish workers, a fact that differed the party from other narodnik groups. The main base of the party was found in Bielorussia (which had a large Jewish population). The party, which functioned as a federation of autonomous local groups, had branches in Minsk, Białystok, Dvisnk, Ekaterinoslav, Zhitomir, Berdichev, and Saint Petersburg.

The party published a programmatic manifesto (edited by Gershuni and L. Rodionova-Kliacho) in 1900, titled "About Freedom". The manifesto identified autocracy as the main enemy of the people (rather than capitalism or the industrialists). The document proposed political terrorism as a means of struggle against Russian despotic rule.

The Workers' Party for the Political Liberation of Russia party was one of the groups that affiliated itself with the Socialist Revolutionary Party in 1902.
