= Moscow uprising of 1905 =

Uprising during the 1905 Russian Revolution

- Part of the 1905 Russian Revolution
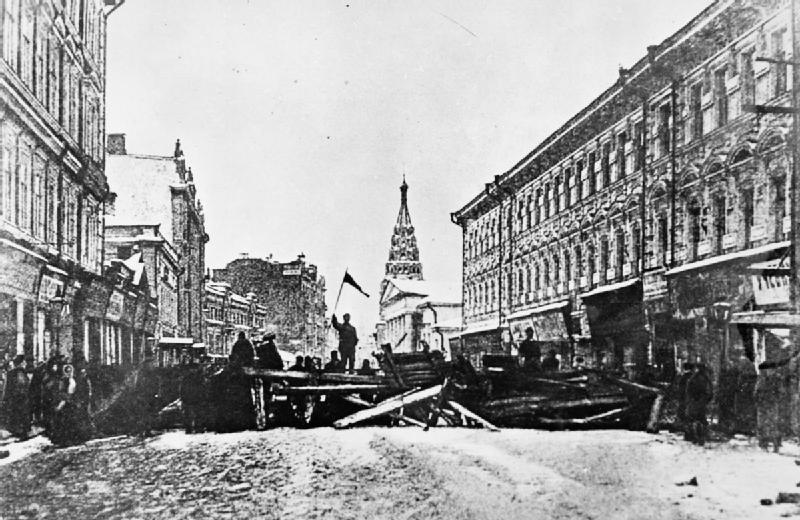
- Barricade in Moscow in December 1905
Date	7–18 December 1905
Location	Moscow, Russia
Result	Government victory

Belligerents
Russian Empire: Moscow Police; Semyonovsky Regiment	Revolutionaries: SRs; Mensheviks; Bolsheviks; Worker Militias

Commanders and leaders
(Russian Empire) Fyodor Dubasov (Russian Empire) Vladimir Dzhunkovsky	Zinovy Litvin-Sedoy

Strength
Unknown	Unknown

Casualties and losses
35 killed	1,059 killed

The Moscow uprising, centered in Moscow's Presnensky district between 7 and 18 December 1905, was the climax of the Russian Revolution of 1905. Thousands of workers joined an armed rebellion against the imperial government fighting for better societal conditions. The uprising ended in defeat for the revolutionaries and provoked a swift counter-revolution that lasted until 1907. The revolution of 1905 was a turning point in Russian history, and the Moscow uprising played an important role in fostering revolutionary sentiment among Russian workers. The Moscow revolutionaries gained experience during the uprising that helped them succeed years later in the October Revolution of 1917.

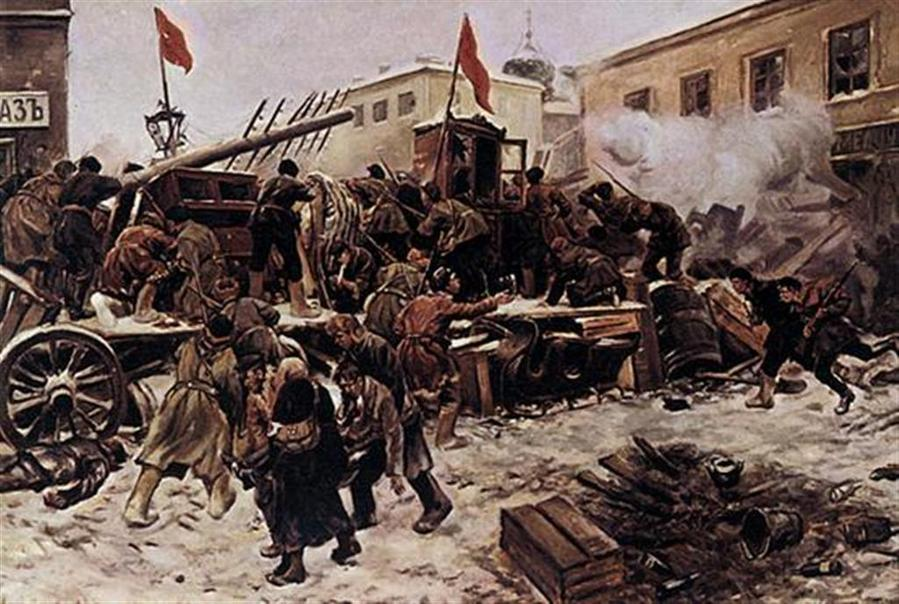
Fighting in Presnya District in Moscow during the uprising

== Background ==
Most left-wing revolutionaries viewed the October Manifesto as an attempt by Tsar Nicholas II to separate the middle and upper classes from the workers and peasants, whose social and political demands remained unanswered. Socialists continued to encourage revolutionary movements.

After months of delay, Lenin returned to Saint Petersburg from Geneva on 21 November [O.S. 8 November]. He immediately called for an armed uprising, indifferent to whether or not it succeeded:

"Victory?!...That for us is not the point at all...We should not harbour any illusions, we are realists, and let no-one imagine that we have to win. For that we are still too weak. The point is not about victory but about giving the regime a shake and attracting the masses to the movement. That is the whole point. And to say that because we cannot win we should not stage an insurrection-that is simply the talk of cowards."

The final provocation for the uprising was the arrest of the Saint Petersburg Soviet on 3 December.

Nicholas II's government knew an uprising was brewing and allowed it to come to fruition as a justification to crush the revolutionaries. The Tsar wrote to his mother: "Although the events in Moscow are very distressing and cause me much pain, it seems to me that they are for the best."

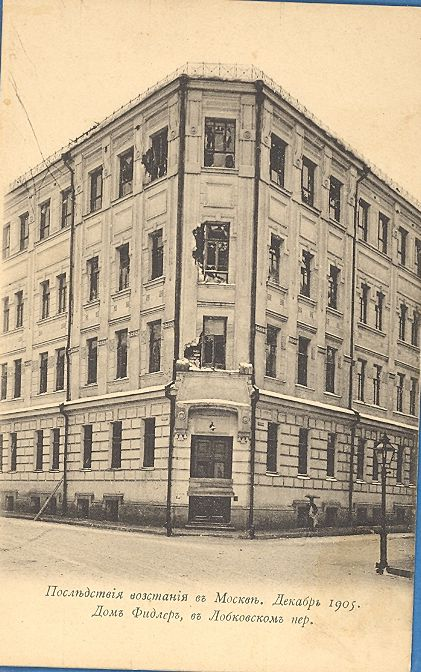
View of Fidler House after the streets fights of Government's troops with mutineers. Corner of present-day Makarenko and Zhukovskogo streets

== Revolt ==
On 3 December, about 150 representatives of Moscow's worker squads gathered at Fidler's technical school, which served as the worker's ministry of war. Despite the besieged group having a white flag, troops continued to shell the building from the afternoon of 3 December until the early morning of 4 December. The shelling resulted in most workers' deaths. The people of Moscow planned a strike on 5 December and called a general strike on 7 December. The strike remained peaceful until 9 December.

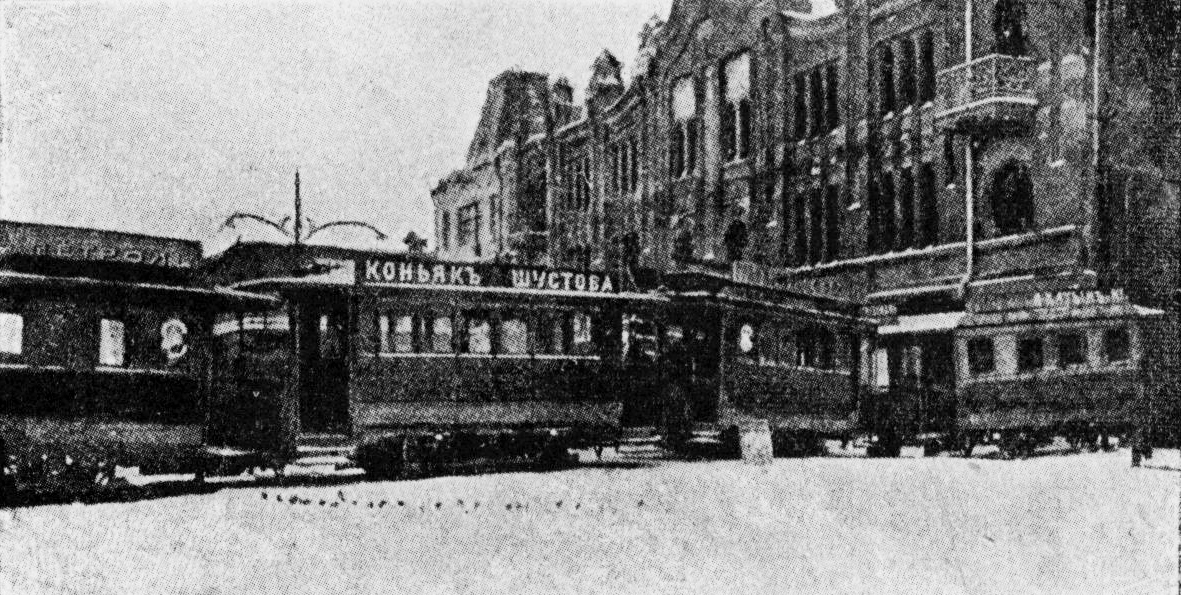
Barricade made of tram cars, Lesna Street

Four Soviets of Workers' Deputies coordinated the uprising. The governor of Moscow, Vice Admiral Fyodor Dubasov, tried to arrest the ringleaders, which provoked a citywide uprising. The revolt was based in Maxim Gorky's apartment—bombs were made in the study and food for the revolutionaries in the kitchen. Gorky disliked the Bolsheviks' dogmatic collectivism but saw them as allies against backward peasants and the Tsar. The Joint Council of Volunteer Fighting Squads armed the workers with 800 stockpiled weapons. They constructed barricades from whatever they could find, including overturned trams. 2,000 men held the barricades with 200 guns. The police tried to dismantle them but failed. Students and even some bourgeois who were angered at the government's violence joined the workers.

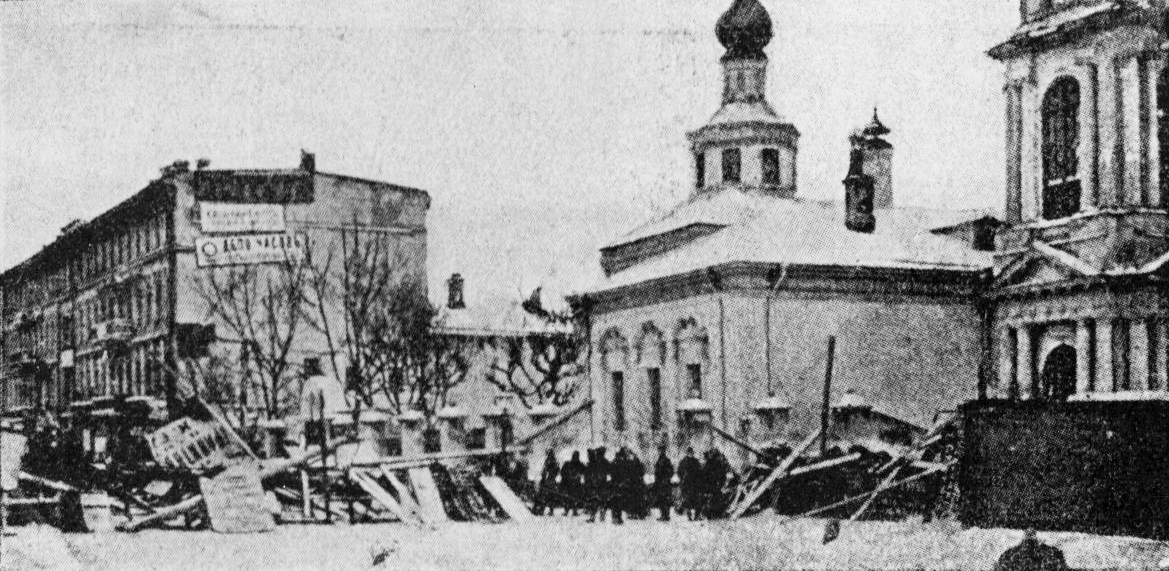
Barricade on the Arbat Street

On 10 December, the Socialist Revolutionaries bombed the Moscow headquarters for the Okhrana, the police force of the Russian Empire, at night.

December 11: The Bolsheviks issued a handbook on street fighting. The military wing of the Moscow Committee of the Social-Democratic Workers' Party sent out a pamphlet to its members during the uprising: "Comrades, our top-priority task is to hand power in the city over to the people. In the section we have seized we'll establish an elected government and introduce the 8-hour work day. We shall prove that under our government the rights and freedoms of everyone will be protected better than they are now."

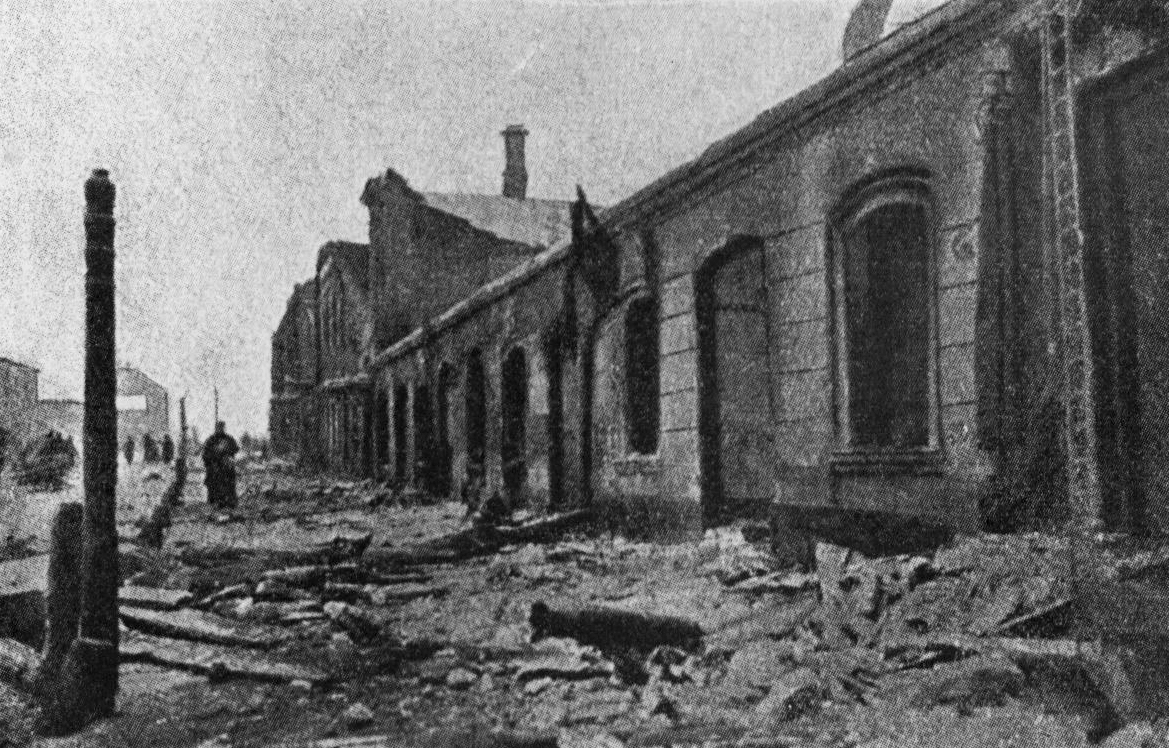
Damage on Bolshaya Presnya Street after artillery fire and a fire in the district

December 12: Six out of seven railway stations and many districts were under revolutionary control. Fifty officers were seized as they arrived by train. Troops and artillery were hemmed in the squares and Kremlin.

December 15: The head of the Moscow Okhrana was assassinated. The Moscow Soviet held its last meeting. The Semyonovsky Regiment of the Imperial Guard arrived in Moscow by rail from Saint Petersburg to reinforce the local garrison.

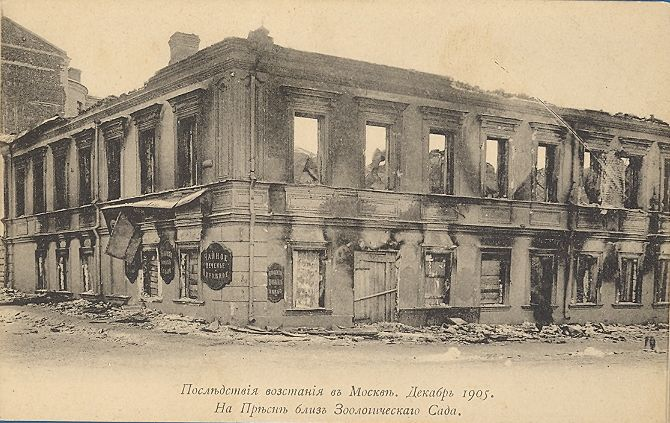
View of house in the Moscow Zoo area after the streets fights of Government's troops with mutineers

December 17: Presnia district was shelled.

December 18: General Georgiy Min, commander of the Semyonovsky Regiment, ordered the last assault: "Act without mercy. There will be no arrests."

December 19: The Moscow Committee of Social-Democratic Workers' Party ordered its comrades back to work. Presnensky commander Zinovy Litvin-Sedoy, issued a last announcement: "We are ending our struggle… we are alone in this world. All the people are looking at us — some with horror, others with deep sympathy. Blood, violence and death will follow in our footsteps. But it does not matter. The working class will win."

== Analysis ==
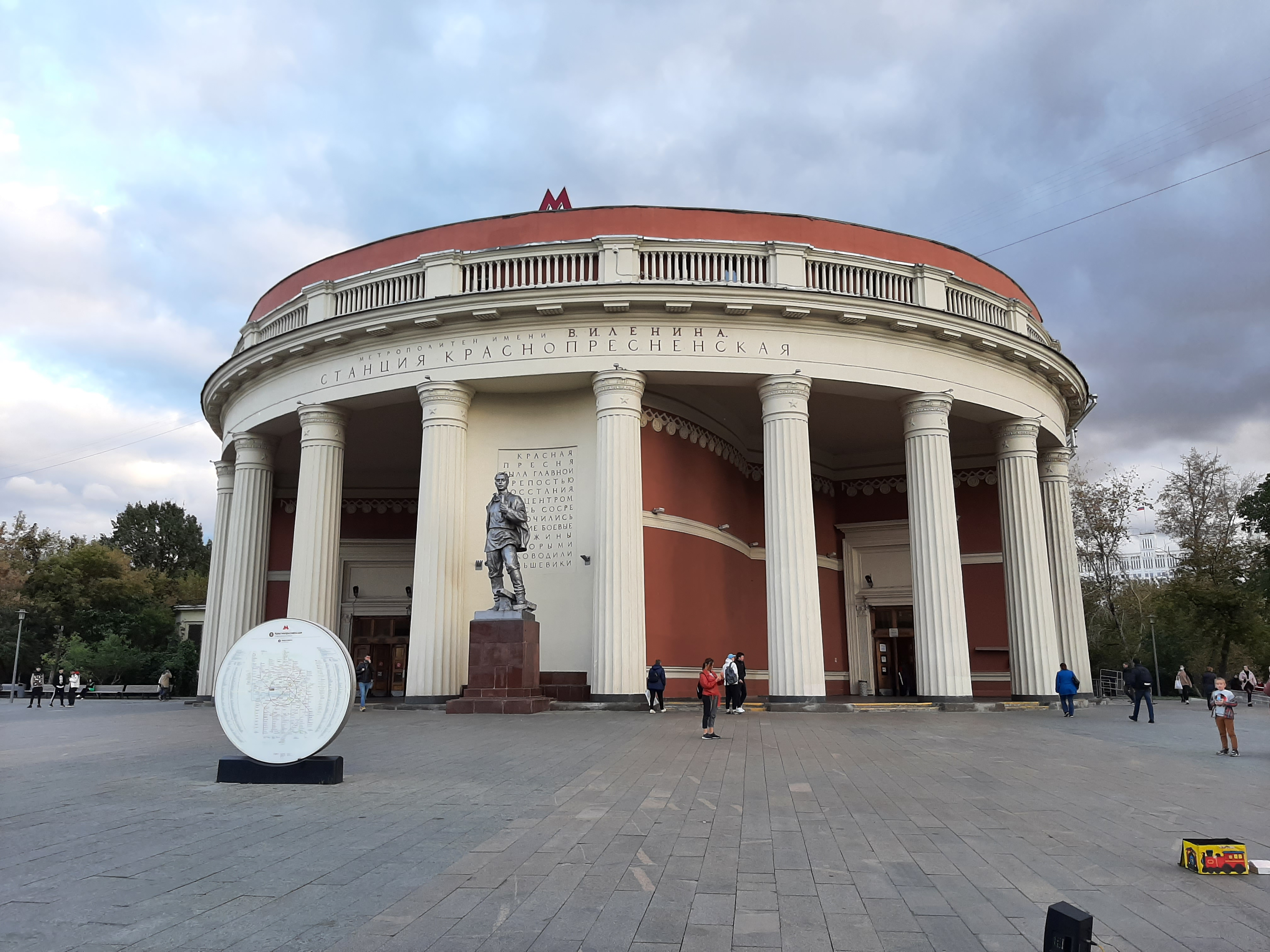
The pavilion of the Krasnopresnenskaya metro station in Moscow, in the historic Presnya district. A statue of a worker who participated in the Moscow Uprising is visible.

Following the proclamation of the October Manifesto and the end of the Russo-Japanese War there was limited hope for a socialist revolution, but the rebels in Moscow could have taken the Kremlin. They failed because each rebel area looked after its own and did not consider the city as a whole. The main rebel district was Presnensky, home to 150,000 citizens, mainly textile workers. It organized its own police instead of attacking the Kremlin. Another key failure was that the Nikolayevsky railway station remained in government hands. This allowed the Semyonovsky Regiment to arrive from St. Petersburg on 15 December and destroy the uprising. The Moscow garrison remained unused due to the government's fear of a mutiny.

35 soldiers were killed, while 1,059 rebels were killed, including 137 women and 86 children.

Less than a year later, on 13 August 1906, General Min was assassinated by Socialist Revolutionaries.
