= The Just Assassins =

1949 play by Albert Camus

- Author: Albert Camus
- Series: Collection Blanche
- Genre: Play
- Publisher: Gallimard
- Publication date: December 15, 1949
- Pages: 99

The Just Assassins (original French title: Les Justes, more literal translations would be The Just or The Righteous) is a 1949 play by French writer and philosopher Albert Camus.

The play is based on the true story of a group of Russian Socialist-Revolutionaries who assassinated the Grand Duke Sergei Alexandrovich in 1905, and explores the moral issues associated with murder and terrorism. In the play, all but one (Stepan) of the "Justes" are based upon historical terrorists, described in Memoirs of a Terrorist by Boris Savinkov.

== Plot with analysis ==
Act I In the apartment used by the terrorists

The 'justes' are a group of revolutionaries plotting to assassinate the Grand Duke with a bomb. The first attempt is meticulously set up, with Kaliayev selected to throw the bomb.

Act II as before

After a period of uncertainty as to the outcome of the first attempt, Kaliayev returns, saying he could not throw the bomb at the carriage, as it contained the Grand Duke's nephew and niece. Stepan is disgusted by this, pointing out that thousands of Russian children have died as a result of Tsarist oppression, but the others take Kaliayev's side, as killing children would harm their cause.

Act III as before

Kaliayev prepares for the second attempt and tries again, two days after the first try. He successfully kills the duke. Voinov leaves the group to join the Party's propaganda division.

Act IV in a prison

Kaliayev is in prison. He has a brief discussion with Foka before Skouratov enters. Skouratov discusses Kaliayev's actions with him before the Grand Duchess enters. She shows Kaliayev the human side of his crime (the actual death of the Grand Duke) and asks him to agree to being a murderer, not a revolutionary, in exchange for his life. Kaliayev is moved by her talk of her husband but stays firm. He says, "Let me prepare myself to die. If I did not die-- it's then I'd be a murderer." Skouratov reenters and makes Kaliayev an offer: either Kaliayev confesses and reveals the whereabouts of his fellows, or Skouratov will publish an article saying he repented his acts to the Grand Duchess, thereby making his fellows believe he betrayed them and their cause.

Act V At the apartment

It is the night of Kaliayev's execution. Annenkov, Dora and Stepan await news of him. Voinov returns for the same reason. Some suggest that Kaliayev may have betrayed them to save his own life, but Dora knows this is not true. This is confirmed shortly afterwards by news of Kaliayev's death. Dora, normally the most gentle of the group, takes on a Stepan-like attitude. She vows to throw herself into terrorism and either to destroy tyranny single-handed to avenge Kaliayev, or be caught, executed and thereby united with him.

== Cast ==
The original production of Les Justes was directed by Paul Œttly and first released on December 15, 1949.

- Maria Casarès as Dora Doulebov
- Michèle Lahaye as the Grand Duke
- Serge Reggiani as Ivan Kaliayev
- Michel Bouquet as Stepan Fedorov
- Yves Brainville as Boris Annenkov
- Jean Pommier as Alexis Voinov
- Paul Œttly as Skouratov
- Moncorbier as Foka
- Louis Perdoux as Prison Guard

== Characters ==
=== The "Justes" ===
Ivan Kaliayev ('Yanek') – The lead character of the play. It is he who throws the bomb that kills the Grand Duke, and goes to prison for it. Kaliayev is also known among the terrorists as 'the poet'. He, like the other 'justes', has sacrificed a good life to fight the tyranny of the Tsarist regime. Despite the sadness and danger of terrorism, Kaliayev repeatedly affirms his love for life — indeed, he is fighting so as to bring a better life to others. He and Stepan Fedorov frequently come into conflict. He used to be the lover of Dora Doulebov. Kaliayev is seen making a number of religious gestures, such as crossing himself. He is also extremely moral, and uncomfortable with the idea of killing a man. His only consolation is that, in killing the Grand Duke, he will reduce suffering for thousands of others ('La Russie sera belle') and that he will pay for the human side of his crime with his life. Even then, he makes certain that he kills only the Grand Duke. Ivan Kalyayev was the real name of the terrorist, as Camus notes in his introduction.

Stepan Fedorov – The only fictional revolutionary of the play, introduced by Camus to show his problems with the Communist party. Stepan enters the play having spent three years in prison before escaping to Switzerland (a reference to Lenin). As a consequence, he is very bitter and unable to appreciate the good aspects of life. He feels that 'freedom is a prison while even one man on Earth is enslaved', and frequently talks about insane acts of indiscriminate destruction, such as asking Dora 'how many bombs would it take to blow up Moscow?'. He also persistently asks to be allowed to throw the bomb, but the other members of the group see him as too unstable to be allowed to do so.

Dora Doulebov – Former lover of Kaliayev. She has had training in chemistry, and therefore acts as the group's bomb-maker. Dora, more than any other of the revolutionaries, remembers and talks fondly of her life before joining the Party. Though normally very gentle, Dora adopts a Stepan-like persona at the end of the play, wishing to avenge Kaliayev's death or die trying.

Boris Annenkov – The leader of the Party. Annenkov makes all the decisions about the assassination, such as who will throw the bomb. He acts in a mediating role in conflicts between Kaliayev and Stepan, and generally serves to calm the feelings of the other members of the group.

Alexis Voinov – A former university student, Voinov was thrown out of university for anti-Tsarist comments. Voinov places a very high value on truth, and feels he must fight tyranny actively. However, when he finds himself unable to throw his bomb in the first assassination attempt, he realises that he is not suited for direct violent action — he is afraid of the moment of deciding to throw the bomb, and he is ashamed of this. He decides instead to transfer to the propaganda division of the Party, saying that although the risks are the same, he does not have to see them.

=== Other characters ===
The Grand Duchess – Grand Duchess Elizabeth Fyodorovna, Widow of Grand Duke Serge. She appears in only one scene, confronting Kaliayev in prison about his actions. She emphasises the human side of the Grand Duke's death, talking about his little habits and good qualities. She asks Kaliayev to admit to being a murderer rather than a revolutionary, in exchange for a pardon, and to accept Christianity. Kaliayev finds his justification severely weakened, but manages to reject her offer.

Skouratov – A member of the secret police who visits Kaliayev in prison. Skouratov represents the hopelessness of struggling against a despotic society. He asks Kaliayev to betray his comrades in exchange for freedom for all of them, but Kaliayev refuses to do so. Skouratov then has published, or threatens to have publish, a newspaper article saying Kaliayev did betray them, so as to destroy the unity of the group. However, if he does so, the group do not believe him.

Foka – A man Kaliayev meets in prison who has murdered someone while drunk. Foka is sceptical towards Kaliayev's socialism, and is instead very acceptant of the world (when Kaliayev describes the socialist vision to him, Foka simply says it is heaven). He is serving a 20-year sentence, but acts as a hangman, getting a year off his sentence for each criminal he hangs.

Prison guard – An intriguingly important character. He represents the class struggle that was prevalent in Russia at the time; never striking but always in the background, in control.

== Adaptation ==
The play was the basis for the 1983 Mexican film Bajo la metralla, directed by Felipe Cazals.

The 1993 Malayalam telefilm Uyarthezhunnelppu, directed by Shyamaprasad, is another adaptation.

The 2017 Telugu (Indian) movie Raktham – The Blood directed by Rajesh Touchriver is also an adaptation of this Albert Camus play.
