= Fyodor Dubasov =

Former Vice Admiral in the imperial Russian Navy and governor general of Moscow

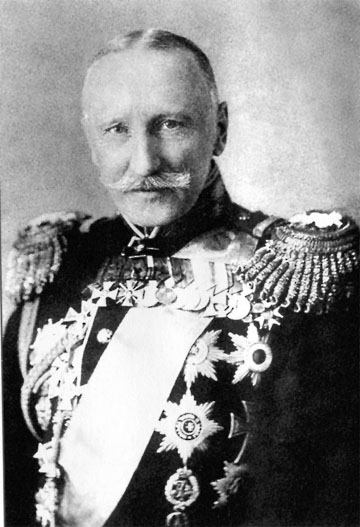
- Fyodor Dubasov, 1905-1906
- Born: 3 July 1845; Shutovo, Rzhevsky Uyezd, Tver Governorate, Russian Empire
- Died: 2 July 1912 (aged 66) Saint Petersburg, Saint Petersburg Governorate, Russian Empire
- Allegiance: Russian Empire
- Branch: Imperial Russian Navy
- Service years: 1870-1905
- Rank: Vice Admiral
- Conflicts: Russo-Turkish War
- Awards: Order of St. George; Order of St. Alexander Nevsky; Order of the White Eagle; Order of Saint Anna; Order of Saint Stanislaus; Order of the Rising Sun; Legion of Honour; Order of the Sword

Admiral Fyodor Vasilyevich Dubasov (Russian: Фёдор Васильевич Дубасов) (3 July (O.S. 21 June) 1845 – 2 July (O.S. 19 June) 1912, Saint Petersburg) served as Governor General of Moscow from 24 November 1905 to 5 July 1906.

Fyodor Dubasov was born into the noble family of the Dubasovy in Tver Governorate. His family had long been associated with the Imperial Russian Navy: one of his ancestors, Avtonom Dubasov, had participated in the capture of a Swedish galley in 1709.

== Naval Service ==
In 1870 Dubasov graduated from the Naval Cadet Corps in Petersburg; the equivalent of the modern Russian Naval Academy named after Nikolai Gerasimovich Kuznetsov. Fyodor Dubasov participated in the Russo-Turkish War of 1877-1878 as a minelayer commander with the Danube Military Flotilla. After the war, he commanded various vessels, including the cruiser Afrika from 1883 to 1885. He commanded the cruiser Vladimir Monomakh in 1889. Dubasov accompanied the future Tsar Nicholas II on his Asian Voyage. In 1891 he commanded the battleship Petr Velikyy. Dubasov was promoted to Rear-Admiral in 1893 and Vice-Admiral in 1889

In 1897–1899, Fyodor Dubasov was placed in charge of the Pacific Ocean Squadron. Under his leadership, the squadron took control over Port Arthur and Dalniy, after the Triple Intervention. In 1901–1905, Dubasov was appointed chairman of the Naval Technical Committee of the Russian Admiralty. In June 1905 he was elected a permanent member of the State Defense Council. In 1905 he was the Russian representative on the international committee investigating the Dogger Bank incident

== Dubasov's role in the Moscow Uprising of 1905 ==
In 1905 Admiral Dubasov was put in charge of punitive expeditions charged with crushing peasant rebellions in Chernigov, Poltava, and Kursk guberniyas. Upon becoming the governor general of Moscow, Dubasov openly characterized himself as the "barnburner". Aspiring to set up rigid administrative control at all levels, Fyodor Dubasov submitted memos to the tsar with suggestions to broaden the powers of governor general and to bring the Moscow garrison directly under his control (was refused). On 6 December 1905 Dubasov placed the garrison troops, the police, and gendarmerie on instant alert. On 7 December the Moscow Soviet called a general strike. Dubasov sanctioned the declaration of a state of emergency in the city and authorized mass arrests. On 8 December Fyodor Dubasov ordered the dispersion of a rally in the Aquarium Garden. On 9 December he sanctioned active involvement of the police by troops of the Moscow garrison whom he had concentrated in the center of City. A major part of the military force available was divided into two units (positioned respectively at the Theatre Square and the Manege Square). The reserve echelon was located in the Kremlin barracks. The government troops occupied the railway stations, State Bank, telegraph, post office, telephone exchange, and water supply. Dubasov called upon the city fire brigades and armed night watchmen to assist the army. On 11 December Fyodor the Admiral issued a decree, which made homeowners personally liable for "letting" the insurgents shoot at the government troops from roofs and windows of their houses. With the increase of numbers of arrested, Dubasov ordered the transferral of some of the prisoners to Petersburg. On 12–13 December he organized large-scale punitive actions against the rioters. As a result, the government troops got the upper hand on 14 December. The authorities introduced the curfew from 21:00 to 7:00 and published a decree forbidding all meetings.

Concern at the reliability of the infantry conscripts who made up the bulk of the permanent garrison of Moscow, had initially placed constraints on Dubasov's repression of the rising. Upon the arrival of the Leib Guards of the Semyonovsky Regiment to Moscow on 15 December Fyodor Dubasov ordered his troops to take control over all the railway stations in the capital (except for the Kursky Rail Terminal). He sanctioned the use of artillery for the suppression of the unrest in the Presnya district. Dubasov turned to the citizens of Moscow with an appeal to seize armed resistance, assist the police, and hand over the rebels. Those involved in the revolt "by deceit or by force" were offered to disarm the militants and take the side of the government troops. On 19 December the insurgency was crushed. On 20 December the Cabinet of Ministers issued funds in the amount of 100,000 rubles for Dubasov to distribute among the suffering population. On 21 December Fyodor Dubasov ordered the elimination of the remaining hotbeds of tension. Subsequently, Dubasov introduced a plan for the reorganization of military and civil administration of Moscow and the Moscow guberniya. On 23 April 1906 a member of the Socialist-Revolutionary Party Boris Vnorovsky-Mishchenko made an attempt on the life of Fyodor Dubasov by throwing a bomb under his carriage. The explosion killed Dubasov's adjutant and the terrorist himself and wounded the governor general and his coachman.

In July 1906, following the assassination attempt, Fyodor Dubasov was formally replaced as Governor General of Moscow . He was appointed as a member of the State Council.

== Later life ==
Dubasov retired to Saint Petersburg in poor health as a result of his injuries. He was involved in building the Church of the Saviour on the Waters in St Petersburg in memory of the Russian sailors killed in the Russo-Japanese War. He died in 1912, just a day before his 67th birthday and was buried in Alexander Nevsky Lavra.
