= Vyacheslav von Plehve =

Russian politician (1846–1904)

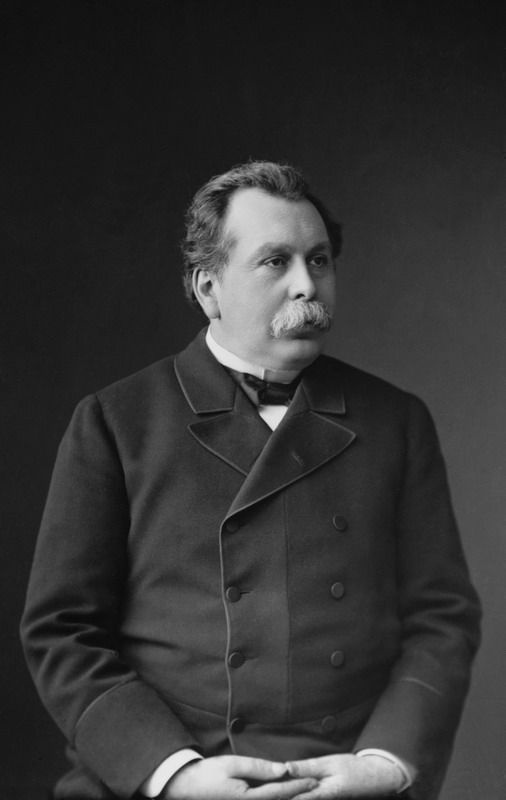
Vyacheslav von Plehve before 1904

Vyacheslav Konstantinovich von Plehve (Note: Also transliterated Pléhve, Pleve, and Plehwe.) (Russian: Вячесла́в Константи́нович фон Пле́ве, IPA: [vʲɪtɕɪˈslaf kənstɐnʲˈtʲinəvʲɪtɕ fɐn ˈplʲevʲɪ]; 20 April [O.S. 8 April] 1846 – 28 July [O.S. 15 July] 1904) was a Russian politician who served as the director of the police from 1881 to 1884 and later as the minister of the interior from 1902 until his assassination in 1904.

== Biography ==
Born in Meshchovsk, Kaluga Governorate, Russia, on 20 April 1846, Plehve was the only son of schoolteacher Konstantin von Plehve and Elizaveta Mikhailovna Shamaev, daughter of a minor landowner. In 1851, Plehve's family moved from Meshchovsk to Warsaw in Russian-controlled Congress Poland, where his father accepted a job as an instructor in a gymnasium.

After studying law at Imperial Moscow University, he joined the Ministry of Justice in 1867. He served as assistant prosecutor in the Vladimir circuit court and as a prosecutor in Vologda. In 1876, he was appointed assistant prosecutor of the Warsaw Chamber of Justice, and in 1879 as prosecutor of the Saint Petersburg Chamber of Justice.

In 1881, he investigated the murder of Alexander II and then joined the Interior Ministry as a Director of the Department of Police, also in charge of the Secret Police. He is credited with the destruction of numerous "People's Will" terrorist groups.

He became a member of the Governing Senate in 1884 and assistant minister of the Interior in 1885. As an assistant minister, at first under Count Dmitry Tolstoy (in office 1882-1889) and later under his successor, Ivan Durnovo (in office 1889-1895), Plehve had shown definite administrative talent.

Made an Actual Privy Counsellor in 1899, he was Finnish Minister Secretary of State from that year until 1904. He supported the abolition of the separate Finnish army in 1901.

In April 1902, following the assassination of Dmitry Sipyagin, Plehve was appointed minister of the interior and chief of Gendarmes. Under his leadership of the interior ministry, peasant uprisings were suppressed in the Poltava and Kharkov provinces after Plehve imposed harsh penalties for the revolting peasants. After a brief attempt at conciliation with the zemstvo conservatives failed, he relapsed—disbanding the police-supported labour unions (zubatovshchina). The same year, Plehve used his position as minister of interior to insist that Hirsh Lekert, who had tried to assassinate the governor of Vilnius, Victor von Wahl, be tried under wartime law. This virtually guaranteed a death-sentence.

In August 1903, Plehve met with Theodor Herzl in Saint Petersburg and discussed the establishment of Zionist societies in Russia. He proposed a Russian government request to the Ottoman Turks to obtain a charter for Jewish colonisation of Palestine.

Plehve became a target for Jewish revolutionaries after his meeting with Theodor Herzl although he had forwarded Herzl's proposals to Tsar Nicholas II.

After Plehve did nothing to prevent a bloody wave of anti-Jewish violence in 1903, the known double-agent Yevno Azef decided not to inform the Tsarist authorities of the plans of the Socialist Revolutionary Party to kill Plehve. He survived one attack in 1903, and two in 1904, before the Socialist-Revolutionary Combat Organization succeeded. On 28 July 1904, Plehve was travelling on his way to his weekly audience with the Emperor. At Izmailovsky Prospekt in Saint Petersburg, Igor Sazonov, a member of the Socialist Revolutionary Party, threw a bomb into Plehve's horse-drawn carriage, killing him at the age of 58.

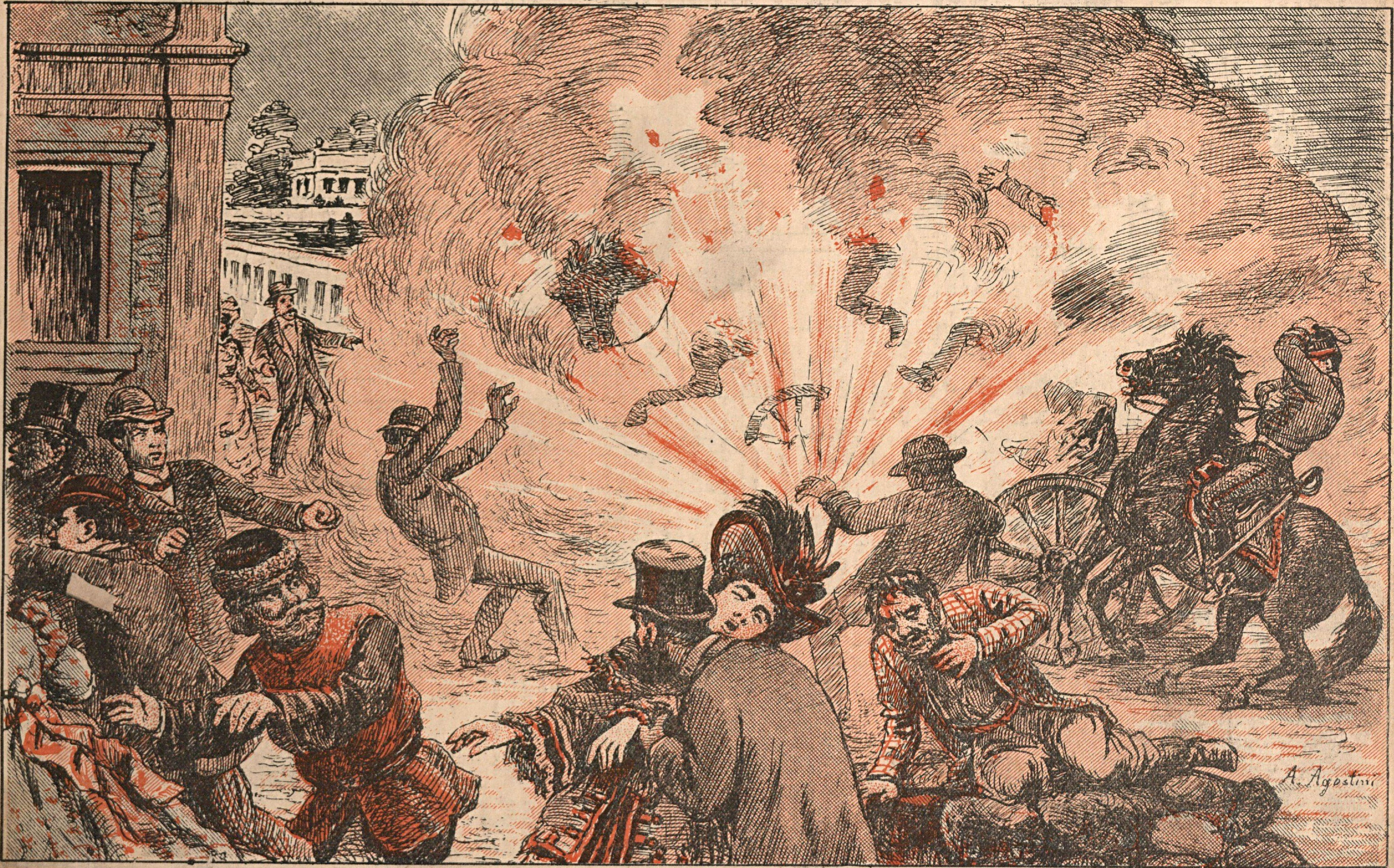
Assassination of Mr. Plehve, Minister of Interior (Angelo Agostini, O Malho, 1904).

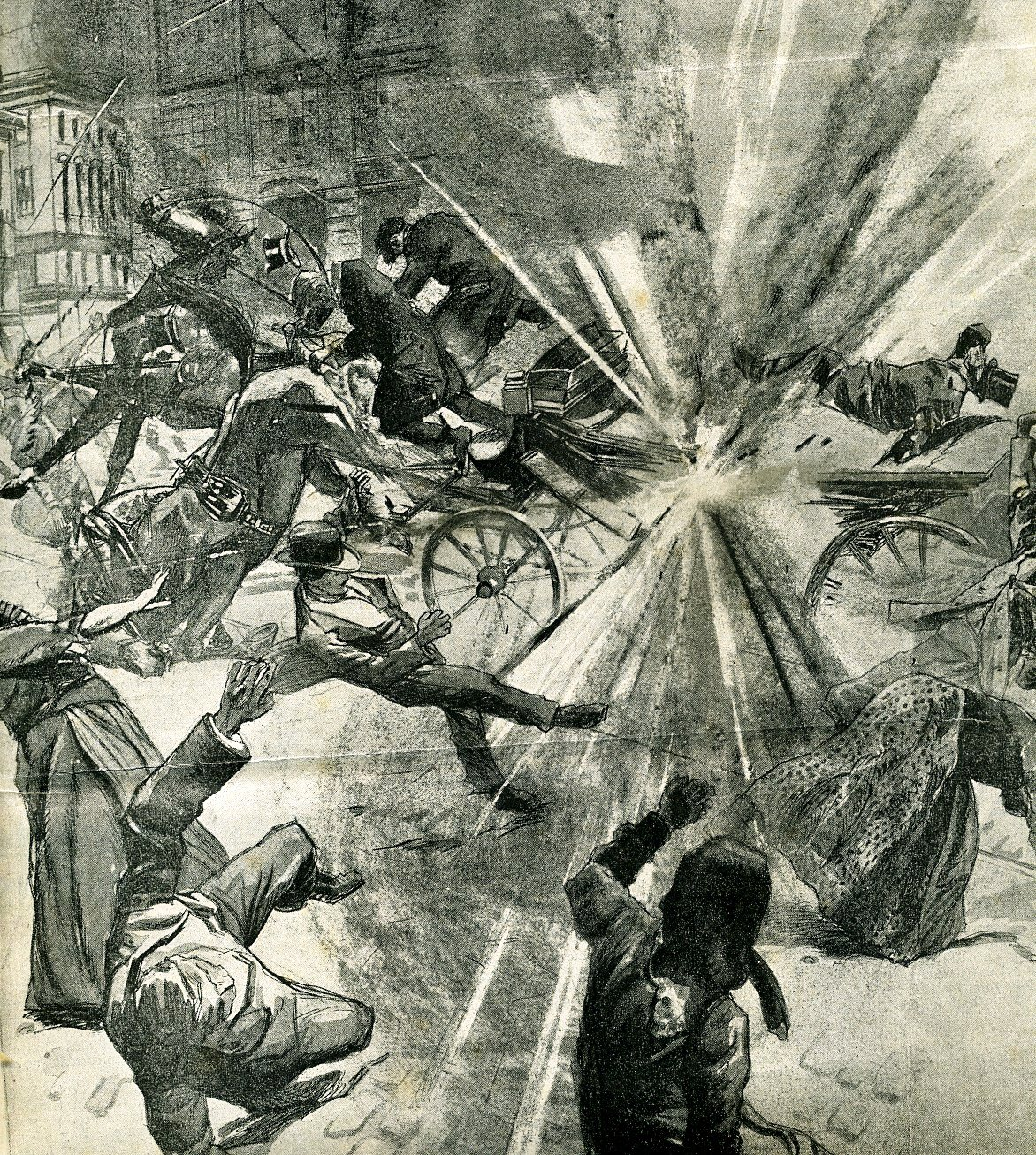
The assassination of Vyacheslav von Plehve, Le Patriote Illustré.

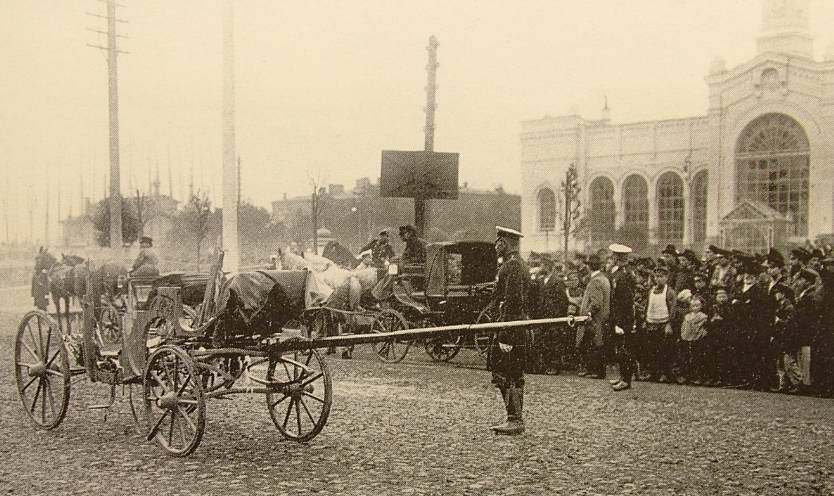
Scene of the assassination in Saint Petersburg on 15 July 1904

== Legacy ==
Because Plehve carried out the Russification of the provinces within the Russian Empire, he earned bitter hatred in Poland, Lithuania and especially in Finland. He despoiled the Armenian Apostolic Church, and was blamed for being accessory to the Kishinev pogroms. His logical mind and determined support of the autocratic principle gained the tsar's entire confidence. He opposed commercial development on ordinary European lines on the ground that it involved the existence both of a dangerous proletariat and of a prosperous middle class equally inimical to autocracy.

== Notes ==
Preceded by Dmitry Sergeyevich Sipyagin	Minister of Interior; 1902–1904	Succeeded by Prince Pyotr Dmitrievich Sviatopolk-Mirskii
Preceded by Victor Napoleon Procopé	Finnish Minister Secretary of State; 1899–1904	Succeeded by Edvard Oeström
