= Grigory Gershuni =

Russian revolutionary (1870–1908)

Gregory A. Gershuni
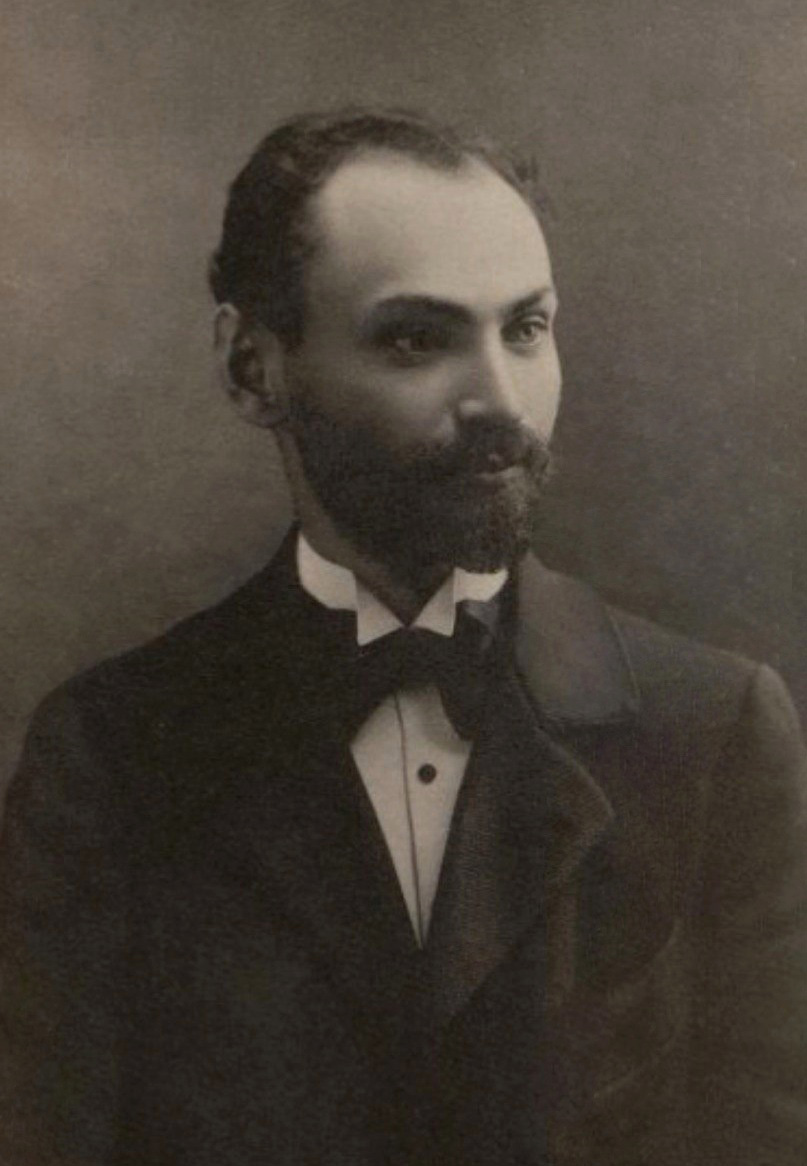
- Gershuni in 1901
- Born: 29 September [O.S. 17 September] 1870; Kaunas, Kovno Governorate, Russian Empire
- Died: 29 March [O.S. 16 March] 1908 (aged 37); Zurich, Switzerland

Grigory Andreyevich Gershuni (Russian: Григо́рий Андре́евич Гершу́ни; 29 September [O.S. 17 September] 1870 – 29 March [O.S. 16 March] 1908) was a Russian revolutionary and one of the founders of the Socialist-Revolutionary Party.

== Early life ==
Gershuni was born in Kaunas, in the Kovno Governorate of the Russian Empire (present-day Lithuania), to a petty bourgeois family of Lithuanian Jews. At the age of three his family moved to Šiauliai. At fifteen his uncle took him as an apprentice pharmacist and Gershuni traveled across Russia, including areas outside of the Pale of Settlement. In 1895 he began his pharmacy studies at Kiev University and became involved in student activities, for which he was briefly arrested. After graduation in 1897, he opened his own chemical-bacteriological laboratory in Minsk.

== Revolutionary life ==
Gershuni was a socialist and a founding member of the Workers' Party for the Political Liberation of Russia. This led to his arrest in 1900 by the Okhrana (secret police). After his release he joined with fellow revolutionaries including Catherine Breshkovsky, Viktor Chernov and Yevno Azef to establish the Socialist-Revolutionary Party in 1901. Gershuni also founded the SR Combat Organization in 1902, which planned and executed the assassination of Dmitry Sipyagin, the Minister of Interior, in April 1902 and of N. M. Bogdanovich, the Governor of Ufa, in May 1903. They failed to assassinate Prince Ivan Mikhailovich Obolensky, the Governor of Kharkov, in July 1902.

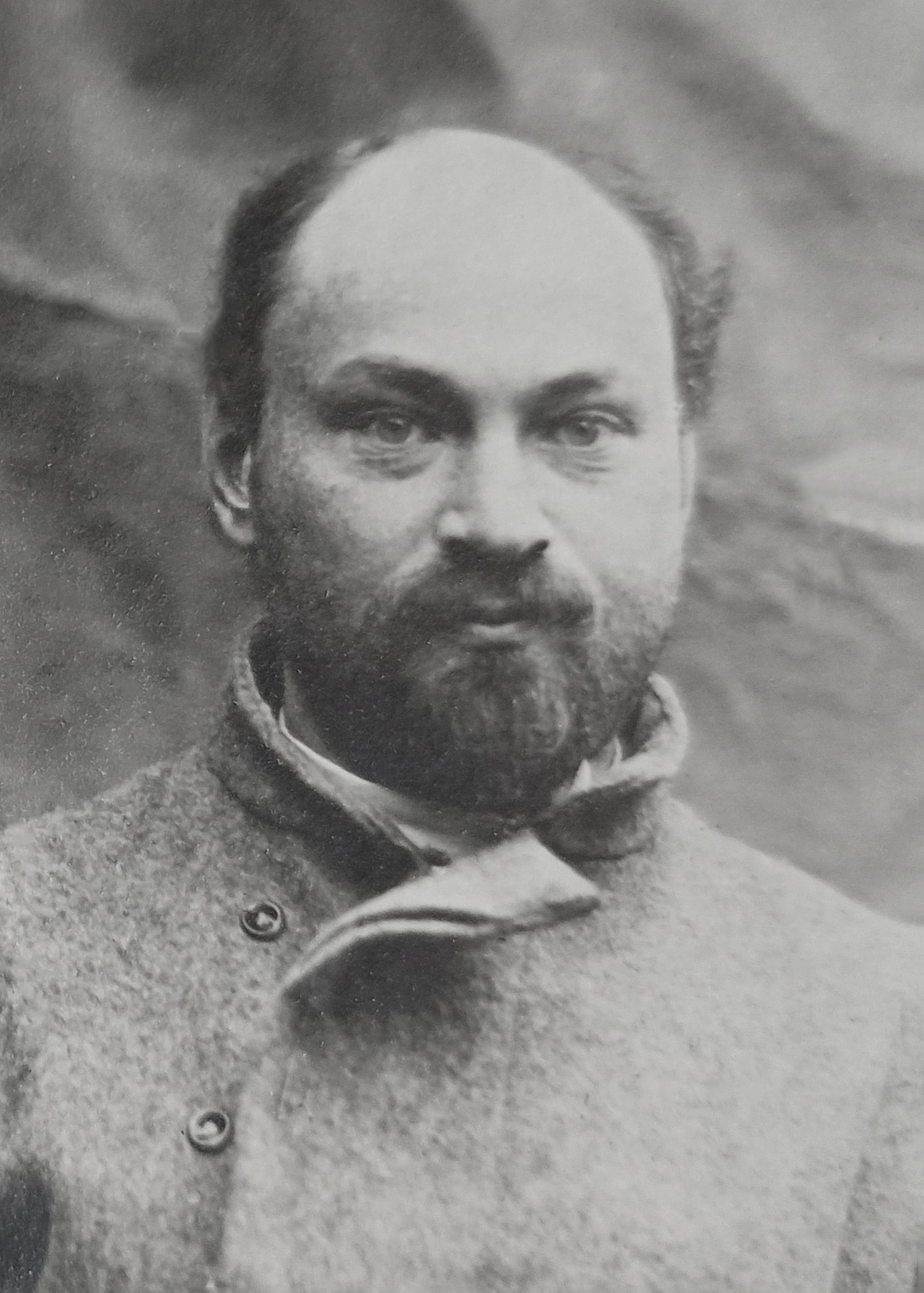
Gershuni after his arrest in 1903

Gershuni was unaware that Yevno Azef, his deputy, was working as an Okhrana spy. In May 1903, Gershuni was arrested in Kiev. In February 1904, Gershuni was tried by a military court in Saint Petersburg and received a death sentence, which later was reduced to life imprisonment at a hard labour camp by Tsar Nicholas II of Russia. In 1906, he hid in a barrel of sauerkraut and escaped from the Akatuy katorga to China.

From China he traveled to Japan and the United States, giving speeches from San Francisco to New York City in support of the socialist-revolutionary causes. In Chicago he met Jane Addams. He returned to Europe in February 1907 in time for the Second Extraordinary Party conference of the Socialist-Revolutionary Party. There he continued to argue for a campaign of terror to overthrow the Tsarist Empire in Russia. Gershuni strongly defended Azef against claims of being a traitor. However, he soon died in Zurich of tuberculosis.
