= Yevno Azef =

Russian revolutionary (1869–1918)

- Евно Азеф
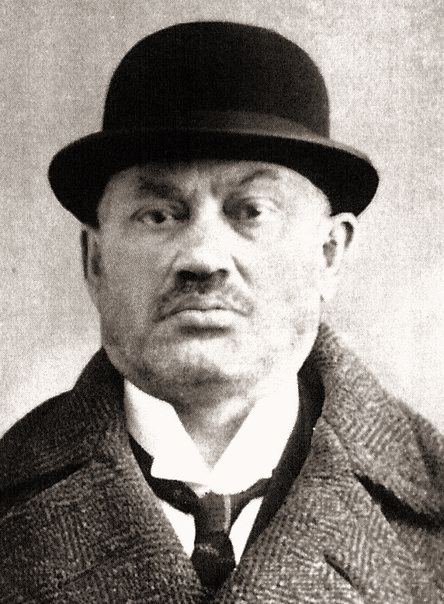
- Born: 1869; Lyskava, Russian Empire
- Died: 24 April 1918 (aged 48–49); Berlin, German Empire

Yevno Fishelevich Azef (Note: Also transliterated as Evno; Russian: Е́вно Фи́шелевич А́зеф, pronounced [ˈjevnə ˈfʲiʂɨlʲɪvʲɪtɕ ˈazʲɪf].) (born Yevgeny Filippovich Azef; (Note: Russian: Евге́ний Фили́ппович А́зеф, pronounced [jɪvˈɡʲenʲɪj fʲɪˈlʲipːəvʲɪtɕ ˈazʲɪf].) 1869 – 24 April 1918) was a Russian socialist revolutionary who also operated as a double agent and agent provocateur. He worked as both an organiser of assassinations for the Socialist Revolutionary Party and a police spy for the Okhrana, the Russian Empire's secret police. He rose through the ranks to become the leader of the Socialist Revolutionary Party's terrorist branch, the SR Combat Organization, from 1904 to 1908.

After the revolutionary Vladimir Burtsev unmasked his activity in 1909, Azef fled to Germany, where he died in 1918.

== Early life ==
Yevno Fishelevich Azef was born in Lyskava (now Brest Region, Belarus) in 1869, the second of seven children of a poor Jewish tailor. His father moved to Rostov with the family when Yevno was five and opened a drapery but barely made enough money to get his children through school. After leaving school around 1890, Azef worked as a journalist and a traveling salesman. In 1892, the police suspected him of distributing revolutionary literature. To avoid arrest, he embezzled 800 rubles and fled to Germany, first to Karlsruhe and then Darmstadt. There, he studied to become an electrical engineer and joined a group of Russian social democrats.

== Double agent ==
In April 1893, Azef wrote to the Okhrana, the Russian secret police, offering to inform on his fellow students, for money. Later that year, he moved to Berne in Switzerland, and in 1894 joined the Union of Socialist Revolutionaries Abroad, which was organised by the respected Narodnik couple Chaim Zhitlovsky and Vera Lokhova.

When he graduated, in 1899, the Okhrana ordered him to return to Russia, where he joined the Northern Union of Socialist Revolutionaries, led by Andrei Argunov, and became, in effect, his right-hand man, even though Azef wanted the revolutionaries to resume the use of terrorist tactics, while Argunov did not believe in violence. He valued Azef's ability to resolve practical problems, such as setting up an underground printing operation, but was unaware that he was being assisted by the Okhrana. In November 1901, Argunov sent him to Europe to help unify the Northern, Southern and foreign Socialist Revolutionary unions into a single organisation. Argunov was arrested as soon as Azef had left Russia. In Switzerland in 1902, Azef became a founding member of the Socialist Revolutionary Party, and served as deputy head of its combat organisation, headed by Grigory Gershuni, which was responsible for acts of terrorism.

Gershuni thought so highly of Azef that he nominated him as his successor, and so when Gershuni was arrested in spring 1903 after being betrayed by another double agent, Azef became head of the combat organisation, with Boris Savinkov as his deputy. Azef thus became both Russia's leading terrorist and most highly paid police informant. In that position he organized the assassination of Vyacheslav Plehve in 1904. Plehve, as minister of the interior, was Azef's nominal employer and the person who had ultimately authorised him to infiltrate the Socialist Revolutionary Party. Plehve had also made Gershuni's arrest the police's main priority, thus facilitating the rise of Azef. In 1905, Azef would organise the assassination of the Tsar's uncle Grand Duke Sergei Alexandrovich of Russia, who served as Governor-General of Moscow.

The success of those two assassinations gave Azef immense prestige within the Socialist Revolutionary Party. Because he was so trusted, he was able to deliver a long list of his rivals within the SR Party over to the Okhrana to be arrested. Their names included Anna Yakimova, a veteran of the plot to kill Tsar Alexander II who had served 24 years in prison, and Zinaida Kopolyannikova, who was hanged in August 1906 for assassinating the head of the Tsar's lifeguards. In 1905 alone, according to researchers who accessed police records after the 1917 revolution, Azef informed against 17 of his subordinates within the SR Combat Organisation.

The assassinations of the Interior Minister and the Tsar's uncle also set off a crisis within the Okhrana. The Director of Police, Alexei Lopukhin, resigned, and was replaced by his rival Pyotr Rachkovsky, whom he despised. One of Rachkovsky's first actions was to sack Leonid Ratayev, who had been acting as Azef's handler, and to personally take over supervision of him. Azef's double-dealing was also resented by the Okhrana's longer-serving officers, one of whom anonymously tipped off the Socialist Revolutionaries that the Okhrana had recruited two informers in their ranks, Azef, and a man named Tatarov. Boris Savinkov ordered Tatarov to be killed: he was stabbed to death on 4 April 1906, but the Socialist Revolutionaries could not believe that Azef was also a spy. Nonetheless, fearing more leaks from within the Okhrana, Azef emigrated to Geneva.

He was in Helsinki in February 1906, when he learnt from a go-between named Pinchas Rutenberg that Father Gapon, the popular hero of the 1905 Revolution, was also a police informant. Azef ordered that Gapon should be killed "like a snake", although he took care to ensure that his own paymaster, Rachkovsky, was not killed, too.

== Exposure ==
Late in 1906, Vladimir Burtsev, a left-wing magazine editor, was approached by Mikhail Bakay, an Okhrana officer and SR sympathizer, who provided him with a wealth of accurate information, including the presence of a spy in the leadership of the Socialist Revolutionary Party. The whistleblower did not know the identity of this spy (codename Raskin). Later, Burtsev spotted Azef riding through St Petersburg in an open cab when most revolutionaries were in hiding and suspected that he was the unidentified spy. Unable to prove his suspicions or to persuade any significant figures within the party to share them, Burtsev contrived to meet Alexei Lopukhin in the carriage of a train leaving Cologne and put it to him that Azef was a spy, which Lopukhin confirmed. Burtsev then wrote up the case against Azef and had it printed and dispatched to the Central Committee of the SR Party, who appointed three veteran revolutionaries (Vera Figner, German Lopatin, and Prince Kropotkin) to a court of inquiry, which held a month-long hearing in Paris and concluded that Burtsev's claims should be taken seriously. Learning where Burtsev had gained his information, Azef secretly visited Petersburg to pressure Lopukhin to repudiate his story. Instead, Lopukhin approached Azef's former mentor, Andrei Argunov, in Petersburg to verify Burtsev's testimony and travelled to London to give the same information to three of the party's representatives. In January 1909, the Central Committee ordered Azef's assassination and tried to lure him to an isolated villa in France, but he fled to Germany.

His wife, Ljuba Mankin, who had been unaware of his double-dealing, divorced him and emigrated to the United States. One of his last acts as a spy was to denounce Lopukhin, who was exiled to Siberia for blowing Azef's cover.

In Germany, Azef lived with a singer and worked as a corset salesman and stock speculator to invest the money he had amassed during his career as a double agent. He was constantly in fear of being recognised and killed. From 1915 to 1917, during World War I, he was interned by Germany as an enemy alien. In prison, he suffered from kidney disease.

== Death ==
Yevno Azef died of kidney failure in Berlin, German Empire, on 24 April 1918. He was buried in an unmarked grave in Friedhof Wilmersdorf.

== Books ==
- Nikolajewsky, B. Aseff the Spy: Russian Terrorist and Police Stool. Garden City, NY, 1934.
- Pevsner, G. La Doppia Vita di Evno Azev (1869–1918). Milano: Mondadori, 1936. 315 pp.
- Anna Geifman Entangled in Terror: The Azef Affair and the Russian Revolution. Scholarly Resources, 1999.
- Richard E. Rubenstein Comrade Valentine: The True Story of Azef the Spy—The Most Dangerous Man in Russia at the Time of the Last Czars. Harcourt Brace and Company, 1994.
- Shukman, H. (ed.) The Blackwell Encyclopedia of the Russian Revolution. Oxford, 1988.
- Hildermeier, M. Die sozialrevolutionäre Partei Russlands. Cologne, 1978.

=== Novels ===
- Rebecca West's The Birds Fall Down (1966) is a spy thriller based on the deeds of Azef.
- Roman Gul's novel Azef (originally General B.O., 1929; later edition OCLC 3229274) hewed closely to the facts, according to Allen Dulles.
- Joseph Conrad's novel Under Western Eyes (1911, OCLC 608066) used elements of the Azef story.

== See also ==
- Bibliography of the Russian Revolution and Civil War
- Outline of the Russian Revolution and Civil War
- Index of articles related to the Russian Revolution and Civil War
