= Inna Lubimenko =

Russian historian (1878–1959)

- Любименко Инна Ивановна
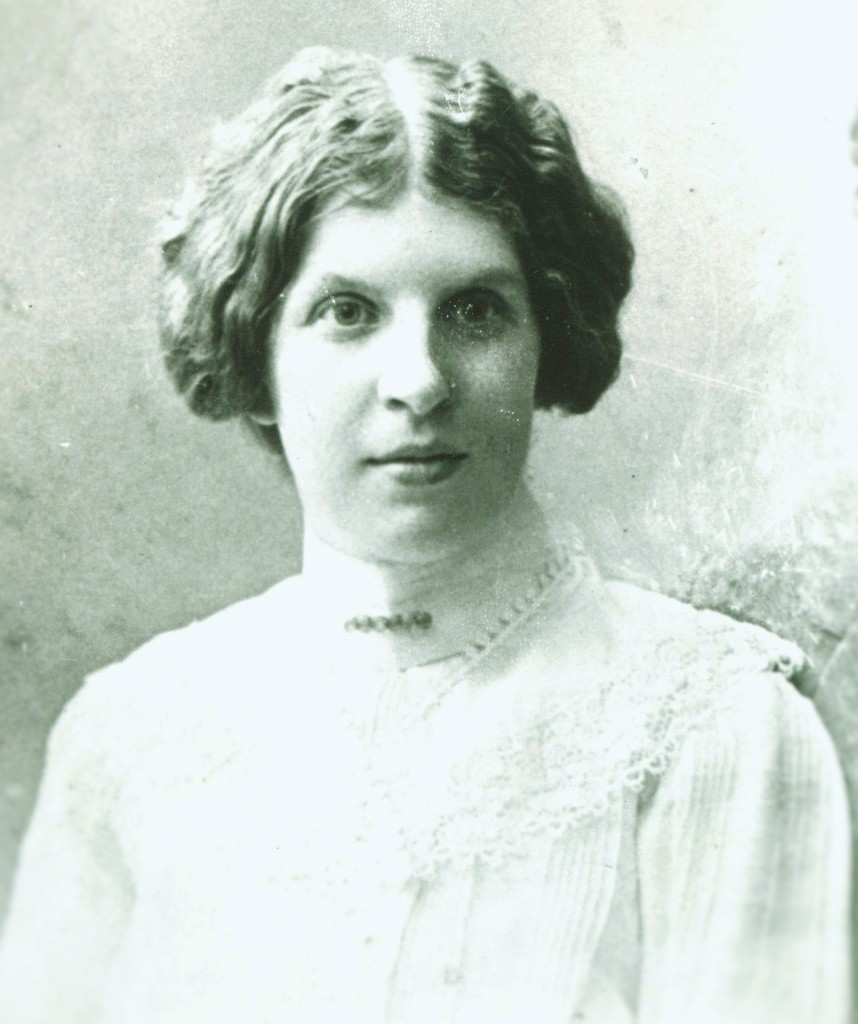
- Born: 1(13) April 1878; Saint Petersburg, Russian Empire
- Died: 15 January 1959; Leningrad, Soviet Union
- Occupation: Historian
- Known for: Writings on Anglo-Russian relations of the early modern period
- Spouse: V. N. Lyubimenko

Academic background
- Education: Obolenskaya Gymnasium
- Alma mater: Sorbonne
- Thesis: "Jean De Bretagne, Comte De Richmond: Sa Vie Et Son Activité En Angleterre, En Écosse Et En France (1266-1334)" (1908)
- Doctoral advisor: Charles Bémont

Inna Ivanovna Lubimenko (Любименко Инна Ивановна), or Lioubimenko, (1(13) April 1878 – 15 January 1959) was a Russian and Soviet historian of the early modern period and a specialist in Anglo-Russian relations. She earned her doctorate in Paris and travelled regularly to London and Moscow in the course of her researches, publishing articles in English language and French journals. She was the only woman to address the International Congress of Historical Studies in London in 1913.

From 1916 she was based in Russia, working as a researcher, archivist, and lecturer at official academic institutions, particularly the Academy of Sciences whose history she researched and helped to write. She was evacuated from Leningrad during the Second World War with her institute and received the medals for the "defence of Leningrad" and for "Valiant Labour in the Great Patriotic War of 1941-1945." After her retirement she wrote essays on the history of Saint Petersburg where she died in 1959.

== Early life and education ==
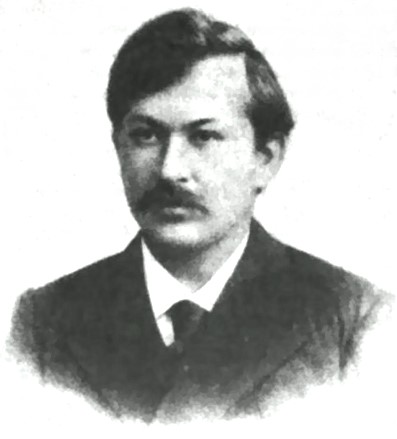
Inna's husband, Vladimir Nikolaevich Lyubimenko

Inna Lubimenko was born in Saint Petersburg, Russian Empire, on 1(13) April 1878. Her father was the botanist Ivan Parfenievich Borodin and her mother Alexandra Grigoryevna Peretz was a translator. One of her sisters was Myrrha Lot-Borodine.

Inna received her basic education at the Obolenskaya Gymnasium before taking higher classes in the history of the Middle Ages under Ivan Mikhaĭlovich Grevs and Georgīĭ Vasilevich Forsten, graduating in 1904.

On Grevs' advice, in 1905 she went to the Sorbonne in Paris. There she studied under Charles Bémont and received her doctorate on the subject of John of Brittany, Earl of Richmond. It was published in 1908.

She married the distinguished botanist and academician Vladimir Nikolaevich Lyubimenko, who worked in the Nikitsky Botanical Garden in Crimea where they lived for a time. He was also at the Sorbonne in 1905.

== Career ==
During her studies in Paris, Lubimenko made regular trips to London and Moscow and developed an interest in Anglo-Russian diplomatic and commercial relations of the early-modern period which became her specialist subject. Her first articles in this area appeared in French and Russian in 1912. She also wrote on Dutch and French relations with Russia.

She was the only woman to address the International Congress of Historical Studies in London in 1913 when she read a paper titled "The Correspondence of Queen Elizabeth with the Russian Czars". It was published in The American Historical Review in 1914 and told how the English accidentally made contact with the Russians in 1553 when the ship Edward Bonaventure was forced to seek shelter on the north coast of Russia due to weather conditions, leading to the English crew coming in contact with the court of Ivan the Terrible, the forming of the Russia Company, and diplomatic contacts between Ivan and Elizabeth I of England.

Later articles explored the subject through the sixteenth and seventeenth centuries from the diplomatic and trading perspectives, identifying the impact of one on the other in strengthening or loosening ties between England and Russia. Multi-part articles in French historical journals explored the different classes of persons who travelled to Russia and their activities there.

After Paris, Lubimenko joined the main Saint Petersburg botanical garden as a foreign correspondent and translator in 1916 before teaching and lecturing at various institutions including the Central Archive. In 1923 she attended the fifth International Congress of Historical Sciences in Brussels and in 1925 travelled to Latvia, Germany, France and England to study archiving methods there and acquire archival material.

Her health began to decline from 1926 but she continued to hold research positions at academic institutions in Russia, particularly the Academy of Sciences about whose founding and history she published a number of articles. She joined the Saint Petersburg branch of the Institute of History in March 1942 and was evacuated in July that year to Yelabuga, then to Tashkent, where she worked until 1944.

She was awarded medals for the "defence of Leningrad" and for "Valiant Labour in the Great Patriotic War of 1941-1945."

== Later life ==
Lubimenko retired in 1952 but continued to participate in academic life, writing essays on the history of Saint Petersburg for a volume on the history of the city that was published in 1955 and editing chapters of the first volume of the history of the Academy of Sciences. She died in Saint Petersburg on 15 January 1959. She received an obituary in the Revue Historique.

== Publications ==
=== Books ===
- Jean De Bretagne, Comte De Richmond: Sa Vie Et Son Activité En Angleterre, En Écosse Et En France (1266-1334). Picard, Paris, 1908.
- Les Relations Commerciales et Politiques de l'Angleterre avec la Russie Avant Pierre le Grand. Librairie Ancienne Honoré Champion, Paris, 1933.

=== Articles - English ===
- "The First relations of England with Russia", Russian Review, February 1914, pp. 54–73.
- "The Correspondence of Queen Elizabeth with the Russian Czars", The American Historical Review, Vol. 19, No. 3 (April 1914), pp. 525–542.
- "A Project for the Acquisition of Russia by James I", The English Historical Review, Vol. XXIX, Issue CXIV (April 1914), pp. 246–256.
- "A Suggestion for the Publication of the Correspondence of Queen Elizabeth with the Russian Czars", Transactions of the Royal Historical Society, Vol. IX (1915), pp. 111–122.
- "Letters illustrating the Relations of England and Russia in the Seventeenth Century", The English Historical Review, Vol. XXXII, Issue CXXV (January 1917), pp. 92–103.
- "The Correspondence of the First Stuarts with the First Romanovs", Transactions of the Royal Historical Society, Vol. 1 (1918), pp. 77–91.
- "The Struggle of the Dutch with the English for the Russian Market in the Seventeenth Century", Transactions of the Royal Historical Society, Vol. 7, December 1924, pp. 27–51. https://doi.org/10.2307/3678262
- "England's Part in the Discovery of Russia", The Slavonic Review, Vol. 6, No. 16 (June 1927), pp. 104–118.
- "Anglo-Russian Relations during the First English Revolution", Transactions of the Royal Historical Society, Vol. 11 (1928), pp. 39–59.

=== Articles - French ===
- "Un précurseur de Pierre le Grand, Boris Godounow", La Revue du mois, 10 February 1909, pp. 208–215.
- "Les Marchands Anglais en Russie au XVI e Siecle", Revue historique, T. 109, Fasc. 1 (1912), pp. 1–26.
- "Trois lettres inédites d’Elisabeth d’Angletterre à la cour de Russie" in Mélanges d’histoire offerts à M. Charles Bemont. Librairie Felix Alcon, Paris, 1913. pp. 549–557.
- "Les Relations Diplomatiques de L'Angleterre Avec la Russie au XVI e Siecle", Revue historique, T. 121, Fasc. 1 (1916), pp. 48–82.
- "Les Marchands Anglais en Russie au XVII e Siecle", Revue historique, T. 141, Fasc. 1 (1922), pp. 1–39.
- "Les projets d’alliance anglo—russe au XVIe et XVIIe siècles", Revue d’histoire diplomatique, T. 38, 1924, pp. 61–74.
- "Les Étrangers en Russie Avant Pierre le Grand: Diplomates, Militaires, Intellectuels", Revue des études slaves, Vol. 4, No. 1/2 (1924), pp. 84–100.
- "Les Étrangers en Russie Avant Pierre le Grand: Marchands, Travailleurs Techniques, Artisans, Agriculteurs", Revue des études slaves, Vol. 4, No. 3/4 (1924), pp. 264–281.
- "L’Organisation des archives dans la Russie des Sovets", Nederlandsch Archievenblad, 1925/26. No. 3.
- "Les Relations Diplomatiques de L'Angleterre Avec la Russie au XVII e Siecle", Revue historique, T. 153, Fasc. 1 (1926), pp. 1–39.
- "La science des archives dans la Russie des Sovets", Nederlandsch Archievenblad, 1926/27, Nos. 1–2.
- "Une nouvelle revue d’archives russes", Nederlandsch Archievenblad, 1927/28, No. 2.
- "Projet d’organisation dun «Bureau d’Archivéconomie» aux Archives Centrales de Moscou", Nederlandsch Archivenblad, 1927/28, No. 4.
- "Les archives de l’Oukraïne Sovétique", Nederlandsch Archievenblad, 1928/29, No. 3.
- "Contribution à l'histoire des relations commerciales franco-russes au XVIII e siècle", Revue d'histoire économique et sociale, Vol. 17, No. 3/4 (1929), pp. 363–402. (With Sergey Rojdestvensky)
- "La rôle comparatif des différents peuples dans la découverte et la description de la Russie", Revue de Synthèse historique, 1929, T. 48. pp. 38–56.
- "Un academicien russe a paris (D'après ses lettres inédites, 1780-1781)", Revue d'histoire moderne, T. 10e, No. 20, New Series, Tome 4 (Nov. - Dec., 1935), pp. 415–447.

=== Russian language works ===
Some of her works in Russian are:

==== Before 1920 ====
- "Английская торговая компания в России в XVI в.", Историческое обозрение. Vol. 16 (1911), pp. 1–23.
- "Первая английская торговая компания в России", Вестник Русско-английской торговой палаты. 1912, No. 4, pp. 132–134.
- "Английский ввоз в Россию в XVI в.", Вестник Русско-английской торговой палаты, 1912, No. 5-6, pp. 209–211.
- "Английский вывоз из России в XVI в.", Вестник Русско-английской торговой палаты, 1912, No. 7, pp. 269–279.
- "О высшем образовании в парижских школах", Труды I Всероссийского женского съезда. Saint Petersburg, 1909, pp. 623–630.
- История торговых сношений России с Англией. Vol. I 16th Century. Yuryev, 1912.
- "Английский проект 1612 г. о подчинении русского севера протекторату короля Иакова I", Научный исторический журнал, 1914, No. 5. pp. 1–16.
- "Прусская историческая школа и ее политическая роль", Современник, 1915, No. 3, pp. 127–141.
- "Англичане в допетровской Руси", Русская мысль, 1915, No. 3, pp. 67–93.
- "Французский ученый о войне и мире (Е. Denis. La guerre. Paris, 1915)", Русская мысль, 1915, No. 5, pp. 5–12.
- "Переписка и дипломатические сношения первых Романовых с первыми Стюартами", Журнал Министерства народного просвещения, July, pp. 53–103.
- "Несколько замечаний в ответ на рецензию г-на А.Изюмоза", Журнал Министерства народного просвещения, March 1916, pp. 186–190.
- "Новые работы по истории сношений Московской Руси с Англией", Исторические известия, 1916, No. 2, pp. 14–26.
- "Проекты англо-русского союза в XVI и XVII вв.", Исторические известия, 1916, No. 3-4, pp. 29–53.
- "Англия и война (A. Chevrillon. Angleterre et la guerre. Paris, 1916)", Русская мысль, 1916, No. 7-8, pp. 9–14.
- "Из прошлого лекарственного и врачебного дела на Руси", Биржевые ведомости утр, 1916, 3 November.
- "Как живут бельгийцы под германским владычеством", Биржевые ведомости утр, 1916, 29 November.
- "Врачебное и лекарственное дело в Московском государстве", Русский исторический журнал, 1917. Vol. 3-4. pp. 1–36.

==== 1920s ====
- "Труд иноземцев в Московском государстве", Архив истории труда в России, 1923, Vols. 6–7. pp. 52–74.
- "Московский рынок как арена борьбы Голландии с Англией", Русское прошлое, 1923. Vol. 5. pp. 1–23.
- "Брюссельский интернациональный конгресс историков", Анналы, 1923, Vol. 4, pp. 319–320.
- "О библиографическом указателе по иностранной архивной литературе", Архивное дело, 1925, No. 2, pp. 160–164.
- "Общегерманский государственный архив", Архивное дело, 1925, No. 3-4, pp. 196–200.
- "Рижский государственный архив", Архивное дело, 1926, No. 5-6, pp. 183–184.
- "Архив немецкого Рейха в Потсдаме", Архивное дело, 1926, No. 5-6, pp. 185–188.
- "Из отчета о заграничной командировке летом 1925 г", Архивное дело, 1926, No. 7, pp. 126–135.
- "Рейнско-Вестфальский экономический архив в Кельне", Архивное дело, 1926, No. 7, pp. 137–138.
- "Новейшие архивные постройки на Западе и их оборудование", Архивное дело, 1926, No. 8-9, pp. 132–138.
- "Отчет главного архивиста о состоянии архивного дела в Голландии за 1924 г.", Архивное дело, 1927, No. 10, pp. 95–97.
- "Новые формы научной работы в Англии", Научный работник, 1927, No. 7-8, pp. 61–71.
- "Новое архивное образование в Бельгии", Архивное дело, 1928, No. 14, pp. 98–99.
- "Союз голландских архивистов", Архивное дело, 1928, No. 15, pp. 88–90.
- "Нариси архивноi библioграфii на заходi за останi 15 рокiв", Apxiвнa справа, 1928, No. 8, pp. 75–80.

==== 1930s ====
- "Французски apxiви пiсля iмперiялiстичноi вiйни", Apxiвнa справа, 1931, No. 4 (15), pp. 35–46.
- "Насколько доступны архивы заграничных стран исследователям", Архивное дело, 1931, No. 24-25, pp. 105–111.
- "Ученая корреспонденция Конференции Академии наук", Вестник Академии наук, 1934, No. 4, pp. 27–38.
- "Здание Кунсткамеры", Вестник Академии наук, 1934, No. 7-8, pp. 51–58.
- "Академик в заграничной командировке в XVIII сVol.", Вестник Академии наук, 1934, No. 9, pp. 23–28.
- "Письма акад. Зуева из его экспедиции на юг России (1781-1782)", Вестник Академии наук, 1934, No. 11-12, pp. 57–66.
- "Об основании Российской Академии", Архив истории науки и техники, Saint Petersburg, 1935, No. 6, pp. 97–116.
- "Заграничная командировка акад. А.И.Лекселя в 1780-1781 гг.", Архив истории науки и техники, Saint Petersburg, 1936, No. 8, pp. 327–358.
- "К вопросу об изучении истории академий наук во Франции и в Германии", Архив истории науки и техники, Saint Petersburg, 1936, No. 8, pp. 405–415.
- "Подготовка русских академических кадров в XVIII сVol.", Вестник Академии наук, 1936, No. 2, pp. 53–56.
- "Ученая корреспонденция Академии наук XVIII сVol. (1766-1782)", Книжные новости, 1937, No. 6, pp. 26–27.
- Ученая корреспонденция Академии наук XVIII в. Научное описание. 1766-1782. Moscow & Saint Petersburg, 1937. 606 pp.
- "Биография В.Н.Любименко", Lyubimenka, Kiev, 1938, pp. 5–13.
- "Государственные архивы Бельгии с 1930 по 1936", Архивное дело, 1939, No. 51, pp. 136–139.

==== 1940s ====
- "Планы английской интервенции в России в начале XVII сVol.", Советская наука, 1941, No. 2. pp. 12–27.
- Очерки по истории Академии наук. Исторические науки (совMoscow с И.У.Будовницем и др.). Moscow & Saint Petersburg, 1945.
- "Рождение Академии наук", Смена, 11 June 1945.
- "Колыбель русской науки", Смена, 13 June 1945.
- "Иван Парфентьевич Бородин", Советская ботаника, 1947, No. 3, p. 168.

==== 1950s ====
- "Россия и Англия в XVII в." in Английская буржуазная революция XVII в. Moscow, 1954. Vol. II. pp. 90–117.
- "Культурная жизнь Петербурга в 60-90-х годах XVIII в." in Очерки по истории Ленинграда. Saint Petersburg, 1955. Vol. 1. pp. 410–428. (With Vladimir Vernadsky)
