= Alexey Obolensky =

Russian artillery general (1819–1884)

Alexey Vasilyevich Obolensky
- Алексей Васильевич Оболенский
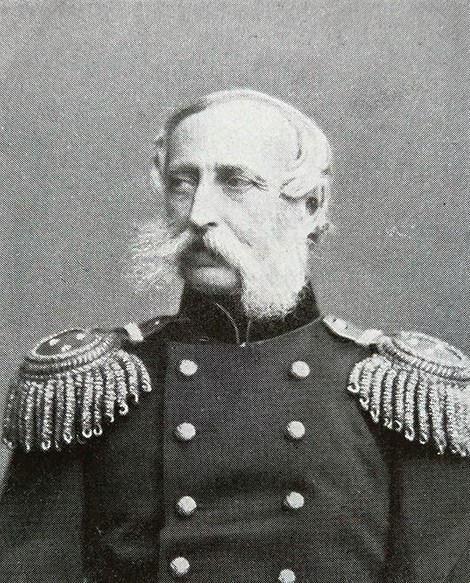

Yaroslavl Governor
- In office January 8, 1861 – May 9, 1861
- Preceded by: Alexey Buturlin
- Succeeded by: Ivan Unkovsky

Moscow Governor
- In office 1861–1866
- Preceded by: Fyodor Kornilov
- Succeeded by: Alexander Sivers

Personal details
- Born: June 4, 1819
- Died: December 13, 1884 (aged 65) Saint Petersburg
- Spouse: Zoya Sumarokova
- Children: Zoya Obolenskaya
- Parents: Vasily Obolensky (father); Ekaterina Musina–Pushkina (mother)
- Education: Physics and Mathematics Department of the Faculty of Philosophy of the Imperial Moscow University
- Awards: Order of Saint Alexander Nevsky; Order of the White Eagle; Order of Saint Vladimir; Order of Saint Anna

Military service
- Allegiance: Russian Empire
- Years of service: 1838
- Rank: General of Artillery
- Battles/wars: Hungarian Revolution of 1848; Crimean War

Prince Alexey Vasilyevich Obolensky (Russian: Алексей Васильевич Оболенский; 1819–1884) was an Artillery General, head of the Moscow Governorate in 1861–1866. Representative of the princely family Obolensky.

== Biography ==
Born June 4, 1819, in the family of Major General Vasily Obolensky and Ekaterina Musina–Pushkina. Having received an excellent education at home and at the Physics and Mathematics Department of Moscow University, Obolensky passed the officer's exam at the Mikhailovsky Artillery School in 1838. In the same year, on April 8, he entered military service as a Fireworker of the 4th Class of the Life Guards of the 1st Artillery Brigade in the No. 1 Light Battery. Two years later he was promoted to warrant officer with a transfer from the 1st to the 2nd Battery, and three years later he was transferred to the same rank in the Life Guards Horse Artillery. On October 10 of the same year, he was promoted to second lieutenant, and on December 6, 1846, to lieutenant.

The following year, Obolensky was appointed adjutant to the Head of the Guards Artillery Sumarokov, but he stayed in this position for only a few months. On April 10, 1848, Prince Obolensky was promoted to staff captain and in November of the same year was appointed adjutant to Grand Duke Mikhail Pavlovich, commander–in–chief of the guards and grenadier corps. The following year, on September 19, he was appointed adjutant wing, and on December 6, he was promoted to captain.

Obolensky carried out the Hungarian Campaign in the retinue of Grand Duke Mikhail Pavlovich, with whom he returned to Warsaw, and soon after the death of the Grand Duke, accompanied his body to Saint Petersburg. Two years later, for the excellent performance of the Highest Orders, he was awarded the Order of Saint Anna, 3rd Degree; in April 1852, Obolensky was appointed commander of a battery of the Life Guards Horse Artillery. In July of that year, he was promoted to colonel. From the time of his appointment as adjutant wing, Obolensky repeatedly carried out the Highest Assignments assigned to him, such as: he conducted an investigation about the fire on June 10, 1850, in Samara and distributed there to the burnt residents the money donated for this by the Sovereign; supervised the recruitment in Ryazan, Podolsk, Volyn, Smolensk, Mogilev and other provinces.

With the beginning of the Crimean Campaign, Obolensky was sent to Novocherkassk to monitor the formation of five Don Batteries, and after that, by order of General Khomutov, he was sent to Sevastopol for reinforcements. In this campaign, Obolensky took part in the battle of September 8, 1854, then in the Battle on the Black River, where the successful actions of the battery under his command greatly contributed to the overall success, and for this deed the prince was awarded the Order of Saint Vladimir, 4th Degree with a Bow. Then, at the beginning of the next year, Obolensky traveled by courier to Saint Petersburg. Upon the death of Emperor Nicholas I, he was sent to Novocherkassk to swear in the Don Army, after which he returned to Sevastopol again. Here he participated in the battle on August 4, and from August 10 to 21, he was on the defensive line in Sevastopol. For excellent courage shown during the Defense of Sevastopol, Obolensky was awarded a Golden Saber with the Inscription "For Courage".

Acting as an aide–de–camp, in 1858, he was also a member of a commission established in Moscow, chaired by Lieutenant General Tuchkov, on the case of unrest and abuse of allowance for the troops of the former Crimean Army, and the following year he conducted an investigation into the causes slow construction of Orthodox churches in the landlord estates of the Vitebsk Governorate. On April 17, 1860, Obolensky was promoted to major general with appointment to the Retinue of His Imperial Majesty and enrollment in field horse artillery, and on January 8 of the following year he was appointed acting military and civilian Governor of the Yaroslavl Governorate, from where he was soon transferred to the post of governor of the Moscow Governorate. In Yaroslavl and in Moscow, he worked very energetically to carry out the Peasant Reform, and in addition, he acted as vice–chairman of the Committee on Prisons. In 1866, Obolensky, at the request, was dismissed from the post of Moscow Governor, leaving the prince in the retinue of His Imperial Majesty.

On April 16, 1867, he was promoted to lieutenant general with enrollment in the reserve troops and leaving the prince in field horse artillery. In the same year he was appointed a senator, and he was ordered to be present in the 1st Branch of the 5th Department of the Governing Senate. Two years later he was awarded the Order of Saint Vladimir of the 2nd Degree, and in May 1875, he was elected an honorary magistrate of the Olgopolsky Judicial District of the Podolsk Province. The prince's further awards were the orders of the White Eagle and Saint Alexander Nevsky. In 1878, he was elected an honorary justice of the peace of the Cherikov Peace District of Mogilev Province. On January 1, 1881, by the Highest Decree, he was appointed to the presence in the Department of Heraldry of the Governing Senate, and two years later, on May 15, 1883, he was promoted to general of artillery, leaving the prince in all positions held.

Obolensky was distinguished by rare spiritual qualities: kindness, responsiveness and modesty. In Saint Petersburg, for a long time, he maintained at his own expense a free canteen for the poor for 200 people. In addition, as a trustee of the first female private gymnasium of his relative Princess Alexandra Obolenskaya, he did a lot of good for the gymnasium.

Obolensky died suddenly in Saint Petersburg from heart failure on December 13, 1884.

== Family ==
Obolensky's wife was Countess Zoya Sumarokova (1828–1897), daughter of General Sergei Sumarokov. From the mid–60s, she lived in Switzerland in a civil marriage with a Polish emigrant Mrochkovsky, under the influence of her husband she became an anarchist, Bakunin and Reclus visited her house. In marriage, she had five children, four of whom were taken from her by the Swiss government and returned to their father in Saint Petersburg. Alexander Herzen wrote about the family drama of General Alexey Obolensky in the Bell. Their children were:

- Ekaterina (1850–1929), the eldest of the children (15 years old at the time of her return to Saint Petersburg). During her first marriage (from July 30, 1867; Dresden) she was married to Alexander Mordvinov (1842–1889), having become a widow, she married the famous doctor Sergey Botkin
- Sergei (August 25, 1851, Pavlovsk – April 28, 1878), lieutenant of the Cavalier Guard Regiment, in 1873–1877, he was at the Russian embassy in Rome. He was buried next to his sister in Rome, later his ashes were reburied in the Estate of Olkha, Yukhnovsky District, Smolensk Province
- Maria (July 1, 1854 – March 25, 1873), beloved of the artist Vasily Polenov; while caring for the sick children of the Mamontovs, she contracted measles and died a few days later: the measles was complicated by pneumonia. She was buried in the Roman Catholic cemetery on Testaccio Hill
- Alexey (1856, Warsaw – 1910), married to Elena Diterikhs (1862–1918) (in her first marriage she was married to Ivan Shcheglovitov)
- Zoya (April 11, 1858 – 1897), baptized on April 19, 1858, in the Panteleimon Church with the perception of grandfather Sergei Sumarokov and his sister Maria Sumarokova; married to Nikolai Rodzianko.

Obolensky's brother, Andrei, was married to Alexandra Dyakova, the founder of the gymnasium. Their son was Vladimir, a prominent figure in the Zemstvo Movement, the Constitutional Democratic Party, a deputy of the First State Duma, a memoirist.

Obolensky's sister, Ekaterina (1820–1871), was married to the chief of the gendarmes, Alexander Potapov.

== Sources ==
- Evgeny Yastrebtsov. Obolensky, Alexey Vasilyevich // Russian Biographical Dictionary: in 25 Volumes – Saint Petersburg – Moscow, 1896–1918
