= Lyubimenko =

Lyubimenko is a surname. Notable people with the surname include:

- Vladimir Nikolaevich Lyubimenko (1873–1937), Russian botanist and academician
- Inna Lubimenko, or Lioubimenko, (1878–1959), Russian and Soviet historian of the early modern period and a specialist in Anglo-Russian relations
