= Vasily Obolensky =

Russian army general (1780 - 1834)

Vasily Petrovich Obolensky
- Василий Петрович Оболенский
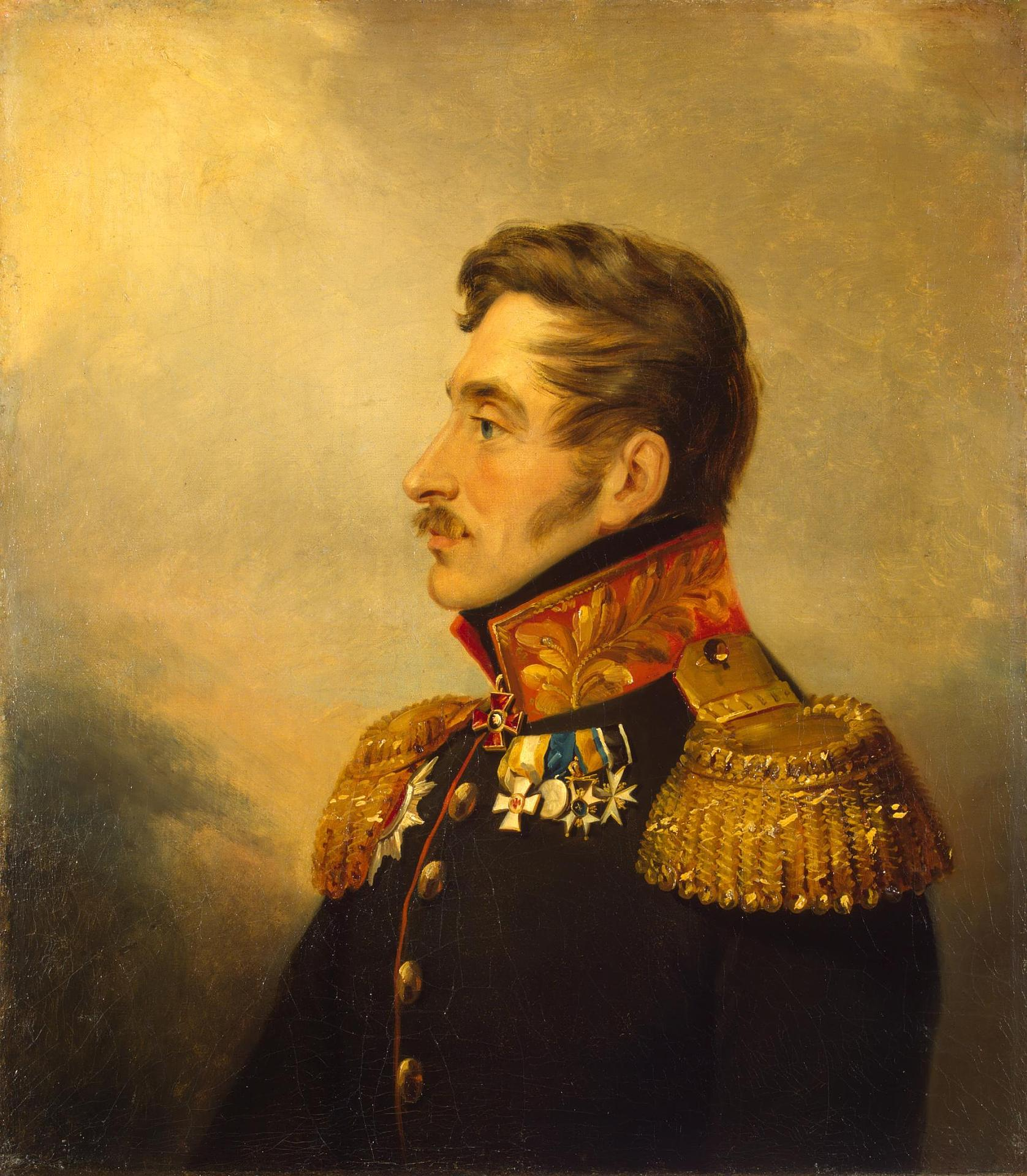
- Portrait of Vasily Obolensky from the workshop of George Dawe. Military Gallery of the Winter Palace, State Hermitage Museum (Saint Petersburg)
- Born: January 5, 1780
- Died: February 5, 1834 (aged 54)
- Children: Alexey Obolensky
- Military career
- Allegiance: Russian Empire
- Service years: 1785 – 1822 (with a break)
- Rank: Major General
- Conflicts: Napoleonic Wars
- Awards: Order of Saint Anna; Order of Saint Vladimir; Order of Saint George; Golden Weapon "For Bravery"; Pour le Mérite; Order of the Red Eagle; Order of the Sword

Prince Vasily Petrovich Obolensky (1780–1834) was a major general in the Russian Army during the Napoleonic Wars, from the Obolensky family.

== Biography ==
Born into a large family of Prince Pyotr Obolensky (1742–1822) and Princess Ekaterina Vyazemskaya (1741–1811), the aunt of Prince Andrei Vyazemsky. Brother Alexander was a senator, Kaluga Governor.

Already at the age of 3, Vasily Obolensky was enlisted in military service in 1783 – in the Narva Infantry Regiment with the rank of sergeant. On June 25, 1785, he received the rank of ensign, on July 4 – second lieutenant; on August 12, he was promoted to captain. In 1792, he retired with the rank of major, without actually starting active service.

In 1801, however, he was again enrolled in service – already in active duty, in the Olonets Musketeer Regiment. In 1805 and 1806–1807, he took part in the war with the French, receiving several orders for campaigns against them. On October 14, 1811, being at that time part of the Life Guards Uhlan Regiment, he received the rank of colonel and the position of adjutant to Prince George of Oldenburg.

On June 5, 1812, Obolensky began the formation of regular Cossack regiments on the territory of modern Ukraine. On June 7, 1812, he personally led the 3rd Ukrainian Cossack Regiment. In September of the same year, he launched a raid into the Duchy of Warsaw, commanding one of the flying detachments of partisans.

On September 3, 1813, he was appointed aide–de–camp, and on February 24, 1813, he was appointed chief of the 3rd Ukrainian Regiment, at the head of which, being part of the troops under the command of Blücher, he fought against the French, in particular under Katzbach. He took part in the battle of Kalisz, in the raid of the flying detachment of General Sergei Lansky on the territory of the Kingdom of Westphalia, later in the battle of Lützen, in which he commanded three cavalry regiments, near Bautzen, Reichenbach, Görlitz, as well as in rearguard battles. On September 28, 1813, he received the rank of major general. For his distinction in the battle of Goldberg, the Prussian King Frederick William III approved the awarding of Obolensky with the Order of Merit.

For bravery shown in the battle of Lützen, he was nominated for the Order of Saint George, 4th Class, but ultimately received it later for long service, since the award for bravery was not approved by the Cavalry Duma. For participation in the so–called Battle of the Nations he received the Order of Saint Anna, 1st Degree. In 1814, he took part in the siege of Mainz and a number of other battles. On September 1, 1814, he received the post of commander of the 2nd Brigade of the Ukrainian Cossack Regular Division. From October 26, 1816, he served as duty general of the 2nd Army.

For health reasons, on January 19, 1822, he retired "in uniform" and died 12 years later. The grave in the Novodevichy Convent was lost during the Soviet years.

== Family ==
Wife (from February 13, 1818) – Countess Ekaterina Musina–Pushkina (1786–1870), maid of honor of the court, daughter of Count Alexey Musin–Pushkin and Ekaterina Volkonskaya. As a dowry, Obolensky received an estate in the Kaluga Province. Before her marriage, she suffered from nervous attacks and head shaking after, in June 1806, she fell from a bridge into the river with her father and older sister and the entire crew and was saved by a miracle; she was hardly found in the water. Ashamed of her illness, she hid even from the servants during seizures. For seven years she was treated in Saint Petersburg by different doctors, tried electrical treatment, but her home doctor Karl Grossman was able to cure her. Had children in marriage:

- Alexey (1819, Paris – 1884), artillery general, senator, governor. Married since 1847 to maid of honor Zoya Sumarokova (1827–1897), daughter of Sergei Sumarokov;
- Catherine (August 19, 1820 – 1871), since 1840 married to Alexander Potapov, chief of gendarmes (1874–1876);
- Sofia (January 24, 1822 – 1891), since 1843, married to Prince Boris Meshchersky (1818–1884), their son Boris was a Privy Councilor and Chamberlain. According to a contemporary, Princess Meshcherskaya was "of average height, flexible and slender, with a very thin waist. Her complexion was dark, with a slight blush, her black large eyes had something special and captivating. She passionately loved to dance, had a lot of natural intelligence, resourcefulness and loved to joke subtly and laugh at her neighbors with an innocent humor that added a lot of charm to her conversation". The princess worked actively in charitable institutions, at the end of her life she was fond of painting, and the author of memoirs;
- Alexander (1823–1865);
- Andrey (1824–1875), married to Alexandra Dyakova (1831–1890), founder of the gymnasium;
- Georgy (Yuri, Egor) (1826–1886), participant in the Sevastopol Defense, lieutenant general, Smolensk Provincial Leader of the Nobility (1882–1886);
- Natalya (1827–1892), since 1850, married to Alexander Karamzin, son of the famous historian Nikolay Karamzin.
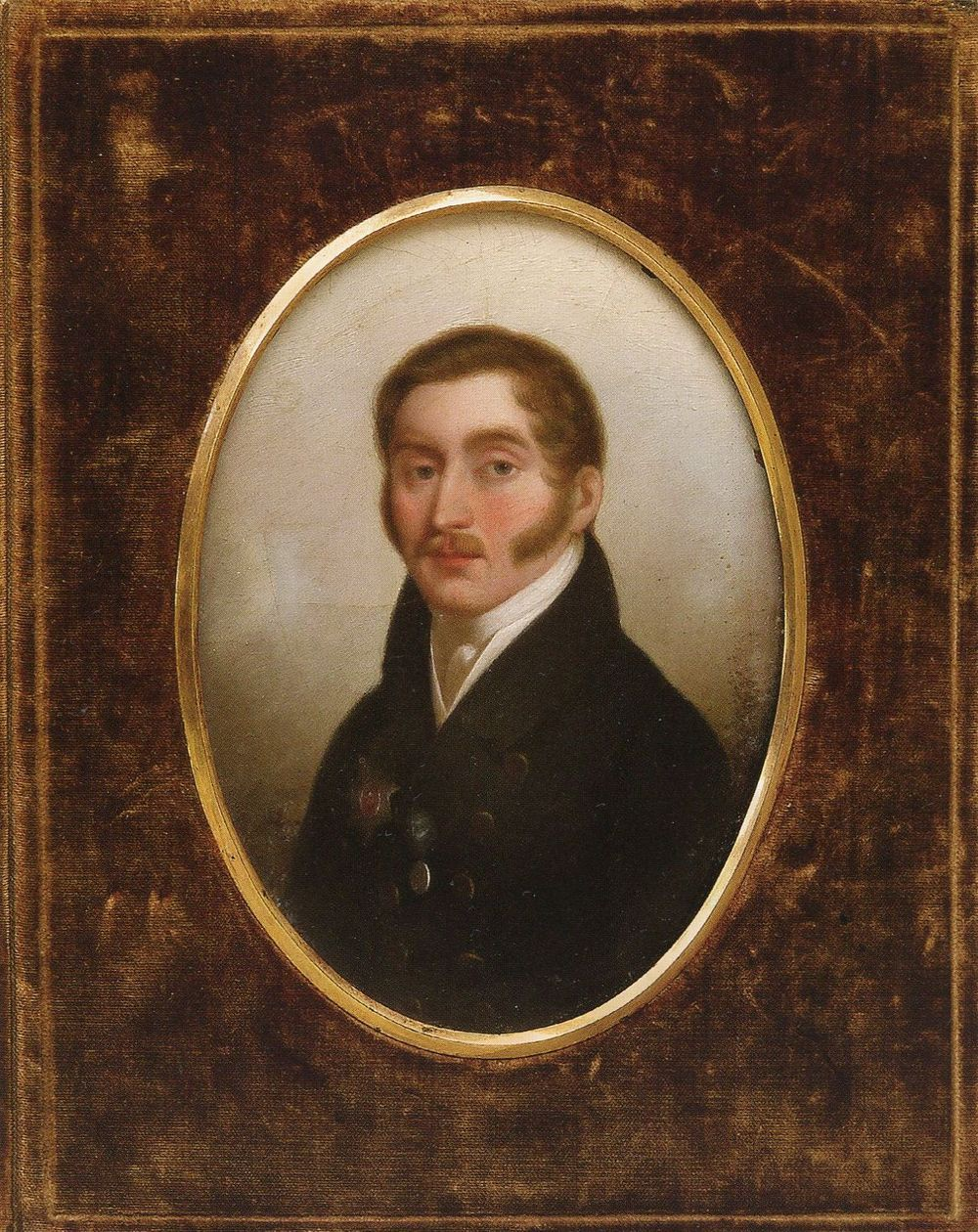
Vasily Obolensky. 1830s

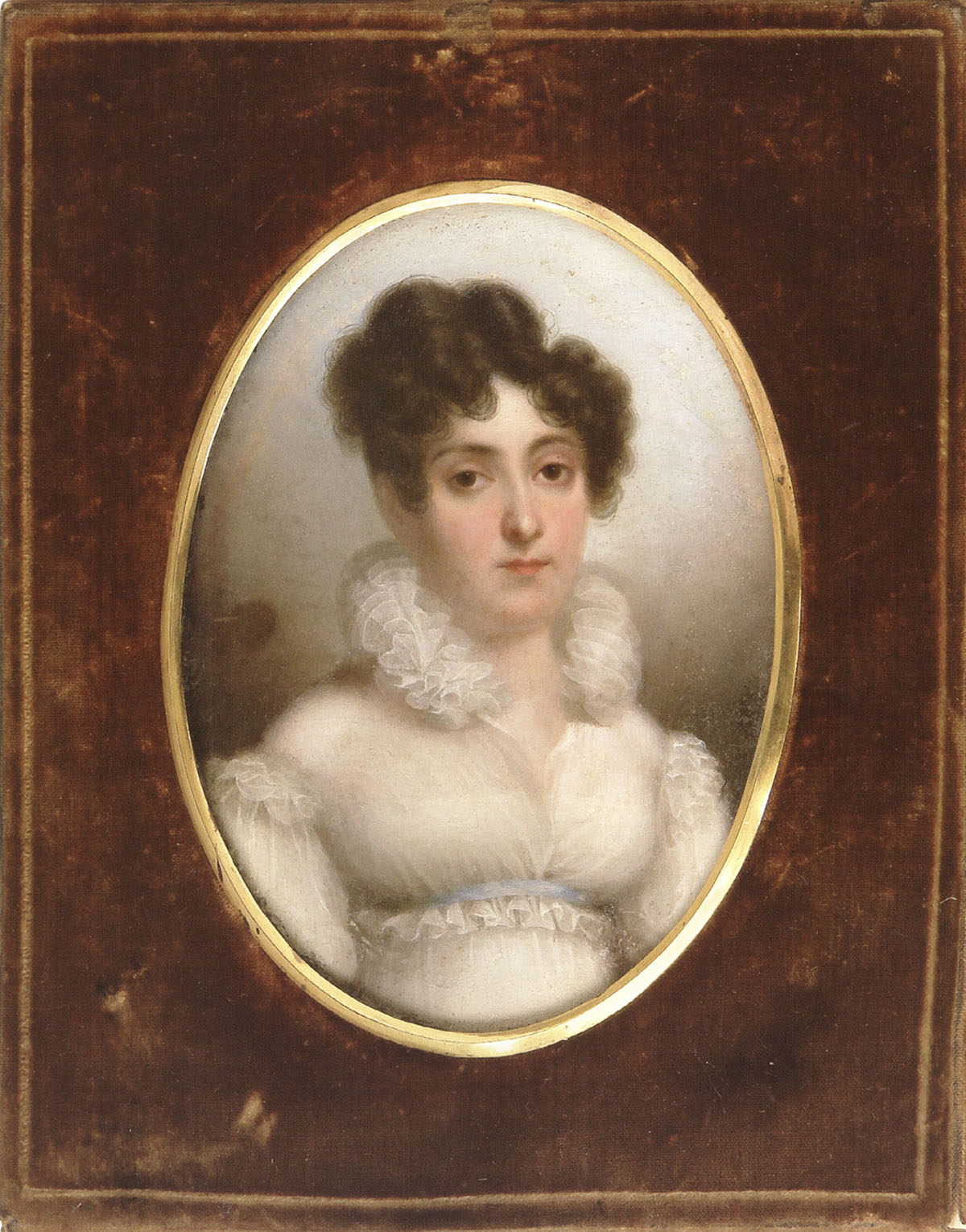
Ekaterina Alekseevna, wife

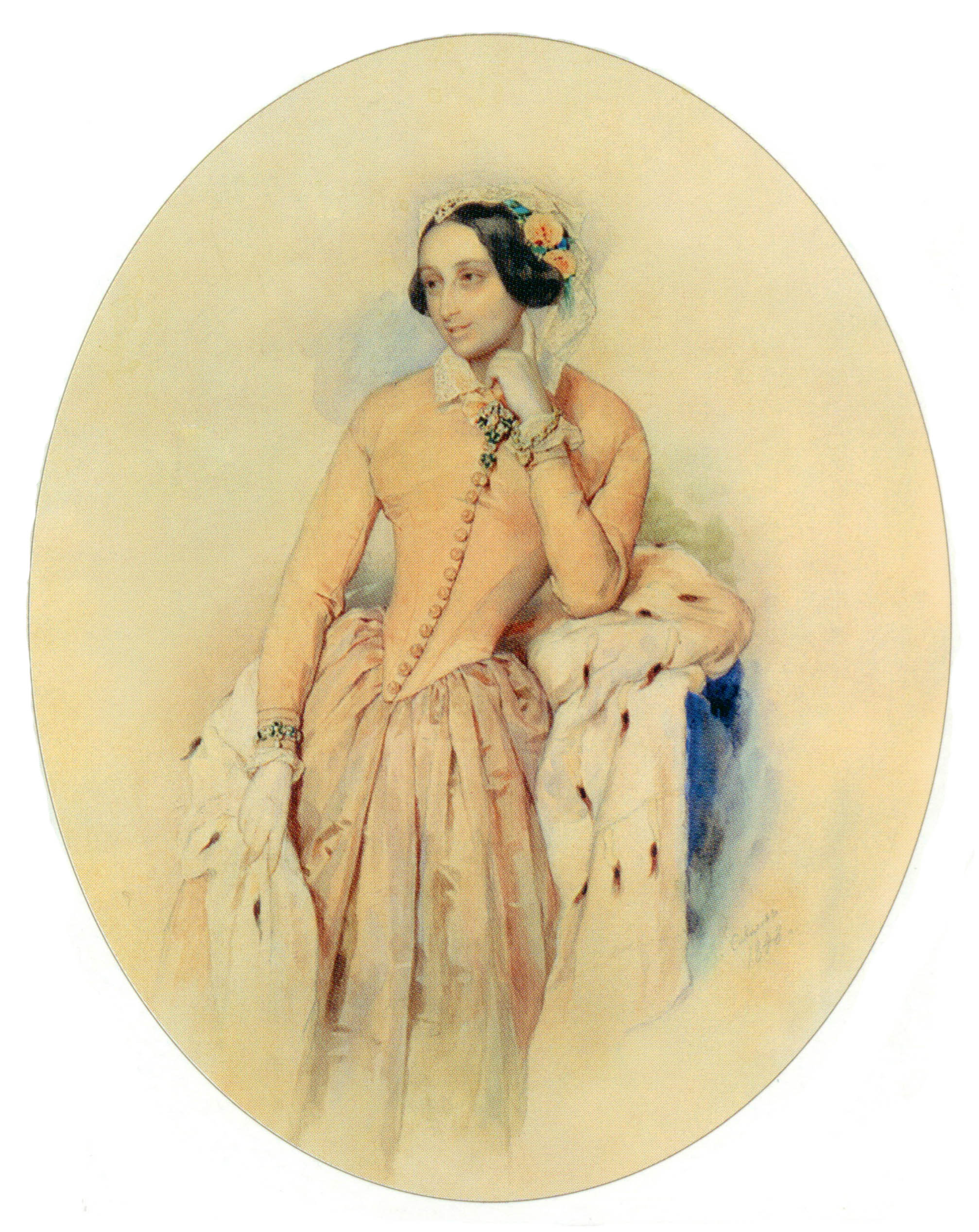
Sofya Vasilievna, daughter
