= Letopis =

- Type: Monthly
- Format: thick journal
- Owner(s): Alexander N. Tikhonov
- Editor-in-chief: A. F. Radzishevsky
- Editor: Maxim Gorky
- Political alignment: Social Democracy
- Language: Russian
- Ceased publication: December 1917
- Headquarters: 1 B. Monetnaya Street, St Petersburg
- Circulation: 10,000-12,000

Letopis (Russian: Летопись, in English, "Chronicle") was a Russian monthly journal published in St Petersburg from December 1915 until December 1917. It had a range of material including literary, scientific and political material. Its political stance was to oppose nationalism and the First World War. Officially A. F. Radzishevsky was the editor but in practice Maxim Gorky edited the journal.

Under the Tsarist regime Letopis was continually censored for an anti-war stance. Nikolai Sukhanov, described how the editors used to meet in Gorky's flat, in particular during the February Revolution:

"One after another people both known and unknown to me, to Gorky himself as well as to me, kept coming in. They came in for consultation, to share impressions, to make enquiries and to find out what was going on in various circles. Gorky naturally had connections throughout Petersburg, from top to bottom. We began to talk and we, the editors of Letopis, soon set up a united front against representatives of the Left, the internationalist representatives of our own views, heedless of the charges of betrayal of our own watchwords at the decisive moment."

Many of the contributors were involved in the Free Association for the Development and Dissemination of Positive Science (SARRPN) after it was founded in March 1917.

In 1917 the Letopis also made a stand against the Bolsheviks, condemning the Bolshevik seizure of power in October 1917.

== Contributors ==
Letopis attracted a large range of notable contributors:

- Boris Avilov
- Vladimir Bazarov
- Isaac Babel
- Alexander Blok
- Alexander Bogdanov
- Valery Bryusov
- Ivan Bunin
- Osip Yermansky
- Sergei Yesenin
- Anatole France
- Maxim Gorky
- Lev Kamenev
- Platon Kerzhentsev
- Yuri Larin
- Jack London
- Vladimir Mayakovsky
- Mikhail Olminsky
- Mikhail Prishvin
- A.F. Radzishevsky
- Romain Rolland
- Maria Smith-Falkner
- Nikolai Sukhanov
- Alexander Tikhonov
- Kliment Timiryazev
- Emile Verhaeren
- H. G. Wells
