= L. V. Dubbelt =

Russian soldier and police chief

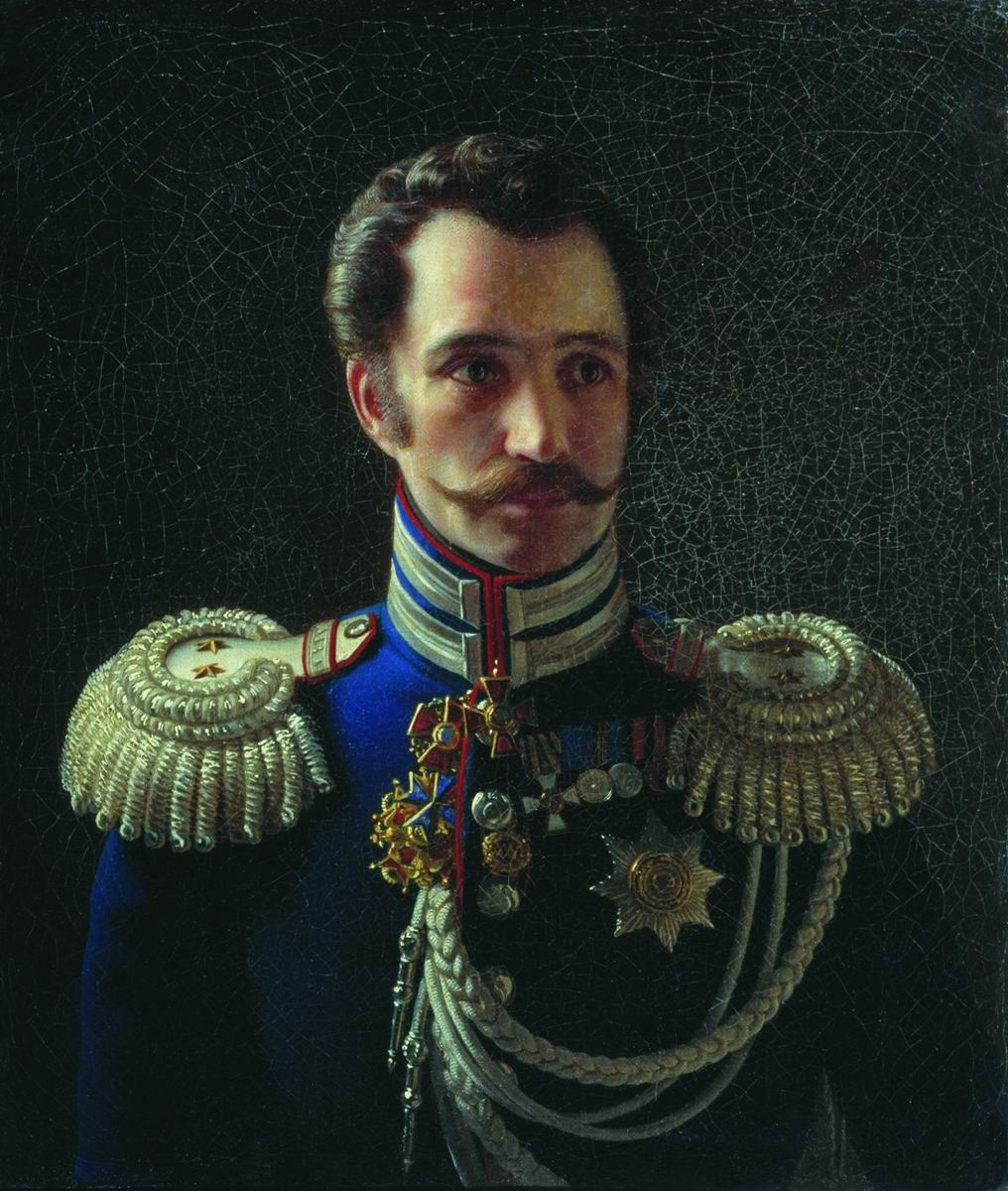
General Leontij Dubelt, as painted in the 1840s by Alexey Tyranov

Leontiy Vasilievich Dubbelt (also transliterated as Dubelt, Russian: Леонтий Васильевич Дубельт) (1792–1862) was a Russian Imperial general and statesman, primarily renowned for his service as the police-chief under Emperor Nicholas I (r. 1825–1855). Dubelt fought against the Grande Armée at the Battle of Borodino in 1812 and briefly came under suspicion of involvement in the Decembrist conspiracy of 1825. Colonel Dubelt resigned from the Imperial Russian Army in 1828 and joined the Corps of Gendarmes - the Russian Empire's uniformed security police. He held senior rank from 1839 to 1856 in the feared Third Section and largely specialised in censorship. In the course of his career he took part in secret-service cases involving writers and intellectuals such as Pushkin (posthumously investigated in 1837), Lermontov (banished to the Caucasus in 1837), Saltykov-Shchedrin (arrested and exiled in 1848) and Turgenev (arrested and exiled in 1852.
