= Free Association for the Development and Dissemination of Positive Science =

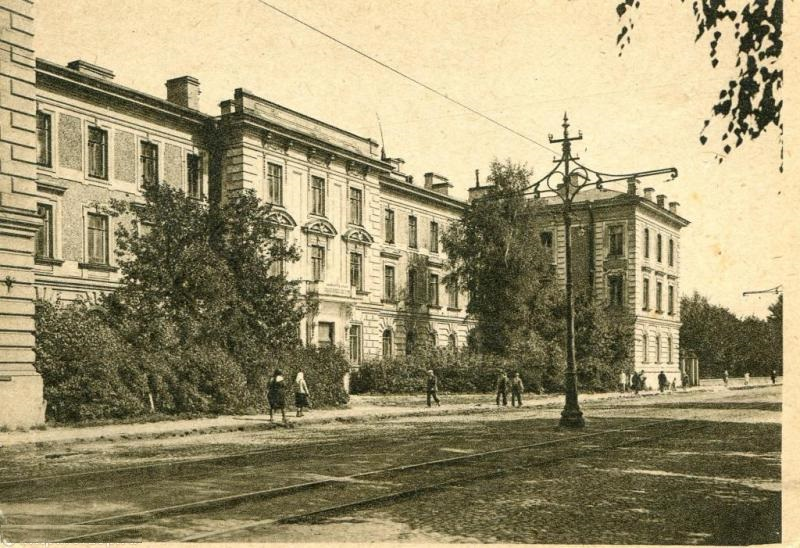
Women's Medical Institute, venue of the inaugural meeting

The Free Association for the Development and Dissemination of Positive Science (Svobodnaia Assotsiatsia dlia Razvitiia i Rasprostraneniia Polozhitel'nykh Nauk – SARRPN) was an organisation established in Russia shortly after the February Revolution in 1917. It was founded on 28 March at the Women's Medical Institute, attended by 96 representatives of the exact scientists. It was organised by members of the Russian Academy of Sciences such as Vladimir Vernadsky, Ivan Borodin, Aleksey Krylov, Vladimir Steklov and Ivan Pavlov. They were joined by the novelist Maxim Gorky, the Bolshevik engineer Leonid Krasin and the physicists Dmitri Egorov and Dimitri Rozhdestvensky. The association aimed to facilitate the application of science to the problems of backwardness and ignorance of Russian society and thus help realise the economic potential of the country.

Over the next two months the association organised three meetings in Petrograd and Moscow attracting such political figures as Pavel Milyukov, Alexander Kerensky and Nikolai Sukhanov.
