= Third department =

The Third Department or third department may refer to:

- Third Section of His Imperial Majesty's Own Chancellery, a secret investigatory department in Imperial Russia
- Third Department of the New York Supreme Court, Appellate Division
- Third Department of the People's Liberation Army of China
