= Nikolai Sukhanov =

Russian Menshevik Internationalist and chronicler of the Russian Revolution (1882–1940)

- Николай Суханов
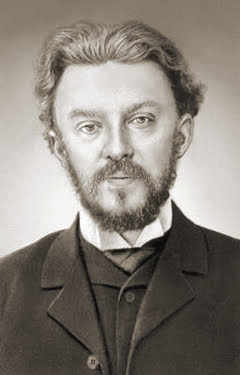
- Born: Nikolai Nikolayevich Himmer; 27 November [O.S. 9 December] 1882; Moscow Russian Empire
- Died: June 29, 1940 (aged 57); Omsk, RSFSR, USSR
- Occupations: Russian Revolutionary and political dissident, economist, publicist, writer
- Political party: Menshevik Internationalist

Nikolai Nikolaevich Gimmer (Russian: Никола́й Никола́евич Ги́ммер); commonly known as Nikolai Sukhanov (Russian: Никола́й Суха́нов) (9 December [O.S. 27 November] 1882 – 29 June 1940) was a Russian Menshevik Internationalist and chronicler of the Russian Revolution. On June 29, 1940, he was convicted on false charges by the Soviet government and shot. He was rehabilitated in reputation after Joseph Stalin’s death in 1953.

== Life ==
Sukhanov was born in Moscow. His father, of German descent, was a railway employee, and his mother a midwife. His parents split after his birth, and his mother was exiled for seven years in a sensational court case to Siberia for bigamy; in 1898 commuted into one-year prison. Himmer gave private lessons while he was at high school. Like his grandmother he was captivated by Tolstoy and Tolstoyanism.

He graduated from the First Moscow gymnasium in 1901 and left for Paris, where he attended lectures at the Russian Higher School of Social Sciences. After returning to Russia in 1903, he became a student at the Faculty of History and Philosophy at the Moscow University.

== Early revolutionary activities ==
In 1900–1902 he traveled through Russia, and met with several revolutionaries (e.g. Lenin, Trotsky, Martov, and Chernov) in Paris. In 1903 he began to study Philology and Philosophy in Moscow, and joined the Socialist Revolutionary Party. Sukhanov became active in propaganda on agrarian reform and lecturing. Following his arrest in May 1904 for possession of illegal literature, he was given an 18-month sentence in the Taganka Prison.

After he was liberated by a crowd in October 1905, he took part in the uprising in Moscow in December. Sukhanov became a contributor to Russkoe Bogatstvo (Russian Wealth) and legally published two books on agricultural reform. He was involved in the Socialist Revolutionary Party and argued with its leaders on how to properly interpret the Narodniks and Marxism. He was rearrested in 1911 and sentenced to exile in Arkhangelsk. During this period his wife left him and moved to Poland with her two sons, after which Sukhanov remarried Galina Flaksermann. Following his release in early March, and having benefited from the amnesty during the festivities of the Romanov Tercentenary, he returned to St. Petersburg, where he became an editor of the radical journal Sovremennik (Contemporary) and Letopis (Chronicle). published by Maxim Gorky. He worked under his own name for the Ministry of Agriculture. As an internationalist he opposed Russia going into war with Germany and Austria.

== The February Revolution (1917) ==
At the beginning of the revolution, Sukhanov was not attached to any party in particular. During the February Revolution in 1917 Sukhanov was one of the founding members of the executive committee of the Petrograd Soviet. An advocate of peace negotiations, Sukhanov opposed the aggressive war policies of Alexander Kerensky and Alexander Guchkov, members of the Russian Provisional Government. Sukhanov had been friendly with Anatoly Lunacharsky but did not follow the latter when Lunacharsky joined the Bolsheviks. He became an editor of Novaya Zhizn.

While working at the Agrarian Institute of the Communist Academy, he opposed Stalin's extreme measures concerning collectivization and industrialization. He was arrested in July 1930. At the 1931 Menshevik Trial, an early show trial by Stalin, Sukhanov was sentenced to exile to Tobolsk in Siberia with a 10-year prison sentence. He worked there as a German teacher. In 1937, he was accused of being a spy working for Nazi Germany and engaging in anti-Soviet agitation. He was sentenced to death by the tribunal of the Siberian Military District, and he was executed on 29 June 1940.

== Memoirs ==
Between 1919 and 1921, Sukhanov wrote a seven-volume memoir of the Russian Revolution of 1917. It was first published in Berlin in 1922, but was suppressed under Joseph Stalin in the 1930s. His memoirs display his disdain for the liberals and their socialist allies alike in the Provisional Government as well as for the Bolsheviks.

In 1967, a German translation appeared of the first volume. In 1955 a one-volume abridged version was published in English under the title The Russian Revolution 1917: A Personal Record by N. N Sukhanov, edited by Joel Carmichael. A Princeton University Press edition was published in 1984 and reissued in 2014. In Russia, his works were under lock and key until 1991 when, for the first time, a reprint was published. In 1992, a special rehabilitation committee declared that all accusations against him had been baseless.
