= Alexey Tyranov =

Russian painter

- Алексей Васильевич Тыранов
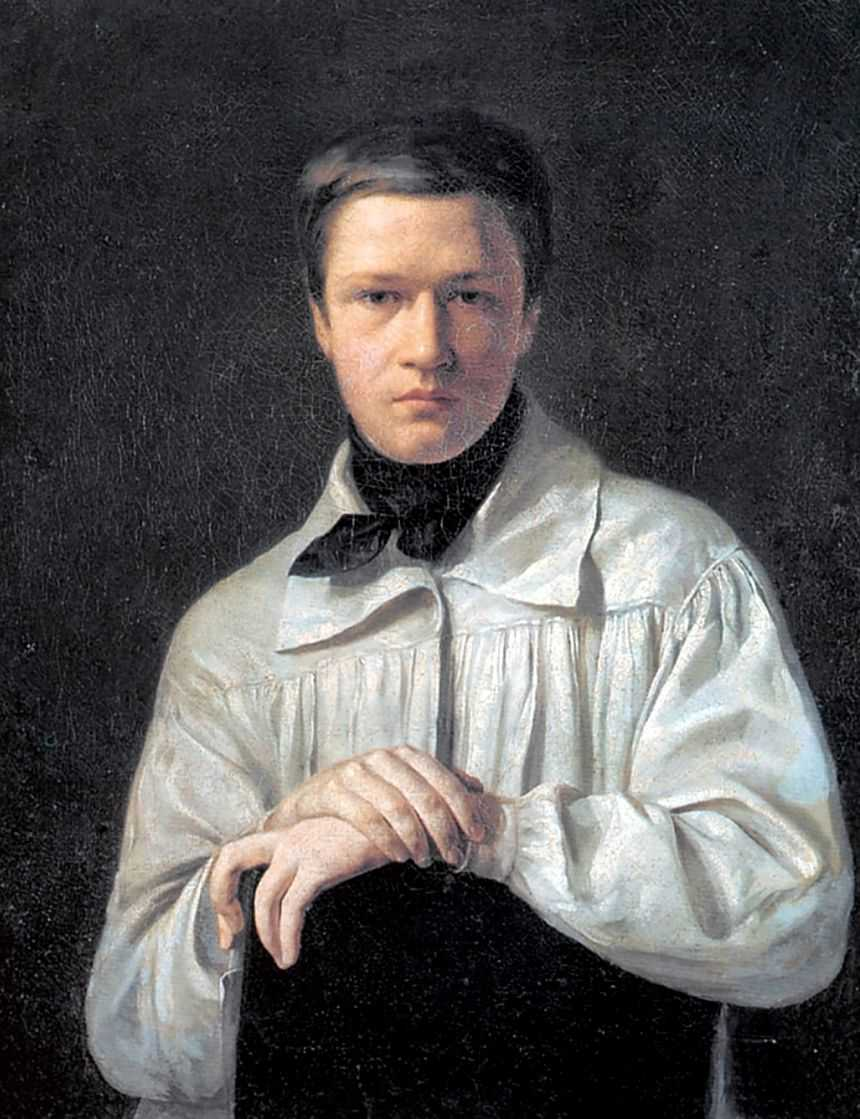
- Self-portrait (1825)
- Born: 1808; Bezhetsk
- Died: August 3, 1859 (aged 50–51); Kashin
- Education: Alexey Venetsianov; Karl Bryullov
- Known for: Painting
- Awards: Big Gold Medal of the Imperial Academy of Arts (1830)
- Elected: Member Academy of Arts (1839)

Alexey Vasilievich Tyranov (Russian: Алексей Васильевич Тыранов; 1808 in Bezhetsk – 3 August 1859 in Kashin) was a Russian portrait and genre painter.

== Biography ==
He was the son of a poor tradesman. After completing primary school in Bezhetsk, he attended the gymnasium in Tver, but was unable to complete his studies due to a lack of money. He returned home and began working for his brother Mikhail, who was an icon painter.

In 1824, while with his brother at the Monastery of St. Nicholas in Terebeni in Tver, he met the painter Alexey Venetsianov, who invited him to study at his art school in the nearby village of Safonkovo. After completing his studies there, he received Venetsianov's recommendation to audit classes at the Imperial Academy of Fine Arts and was granted permission to work at the Hermitage.

During this time, he made lithographs of Venetsianov's works on behalf of the Imperial Society for the Encouragement of the Arts. In 1830, the Academy awarded him a gold medal and named him an "Artist" in 1832. In 1836, he became a member of the Academy and began working with Karl Briullov. Three years later, he was named an "Academician" and was awarded a stipend to study in Rome.

After falling in love with one of his Italian models, he took her with him to Saint Petersburg in 1842. Two years later, she ran away with all of his money, which caused an emotional breakdown that left him mentally disturbed and subject to hypochondria. For long periods, he was unable to work and fell into poverty. Although he was eventually awarded a small pension by the Academy, he found it necessary to go live with his brother in Kashin and died there shortly after, apparently from tuberculosis.

== Selected paintings ==
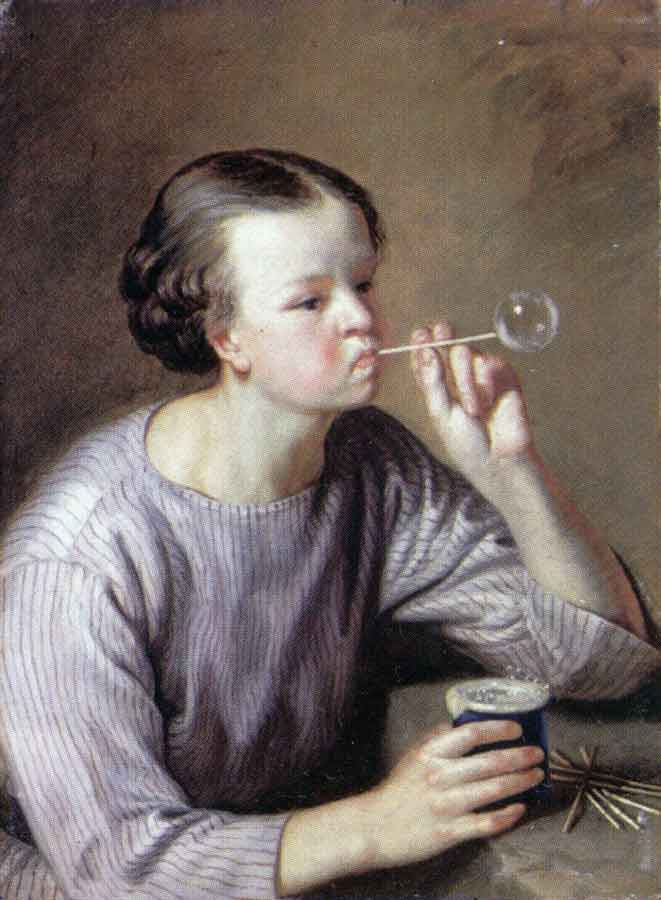
Boy with Bubbles

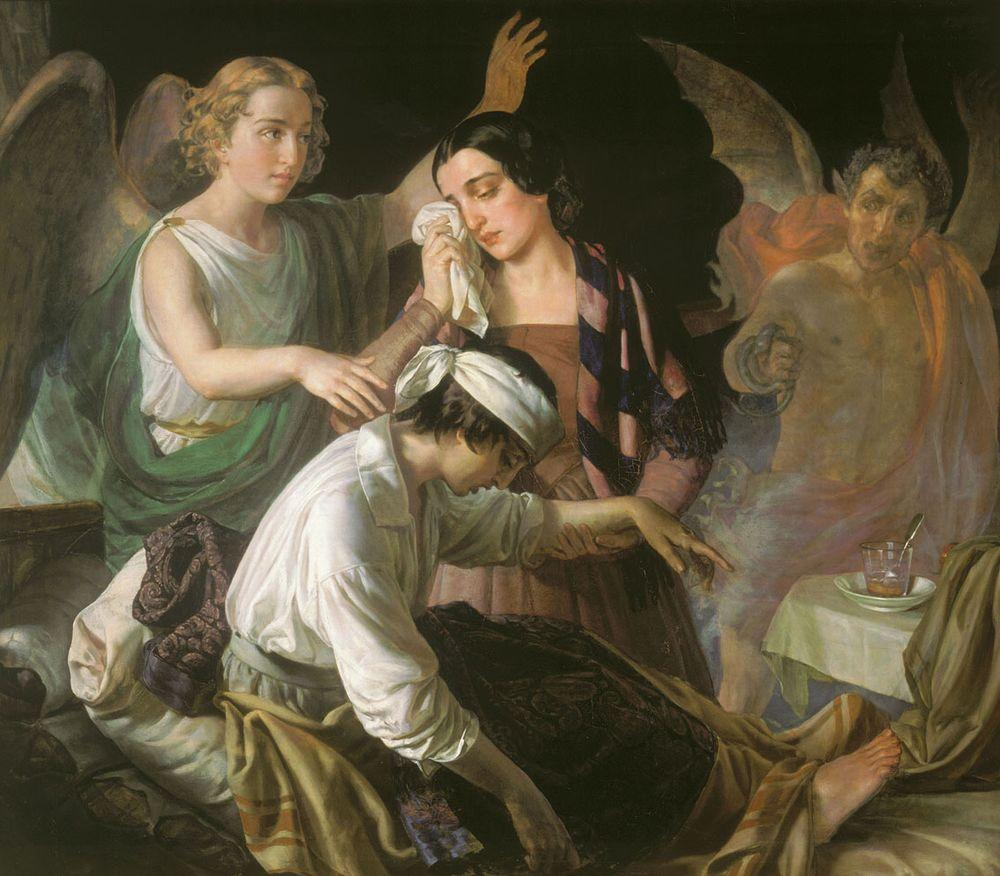
Angel Fighting for
Possession of a Soul

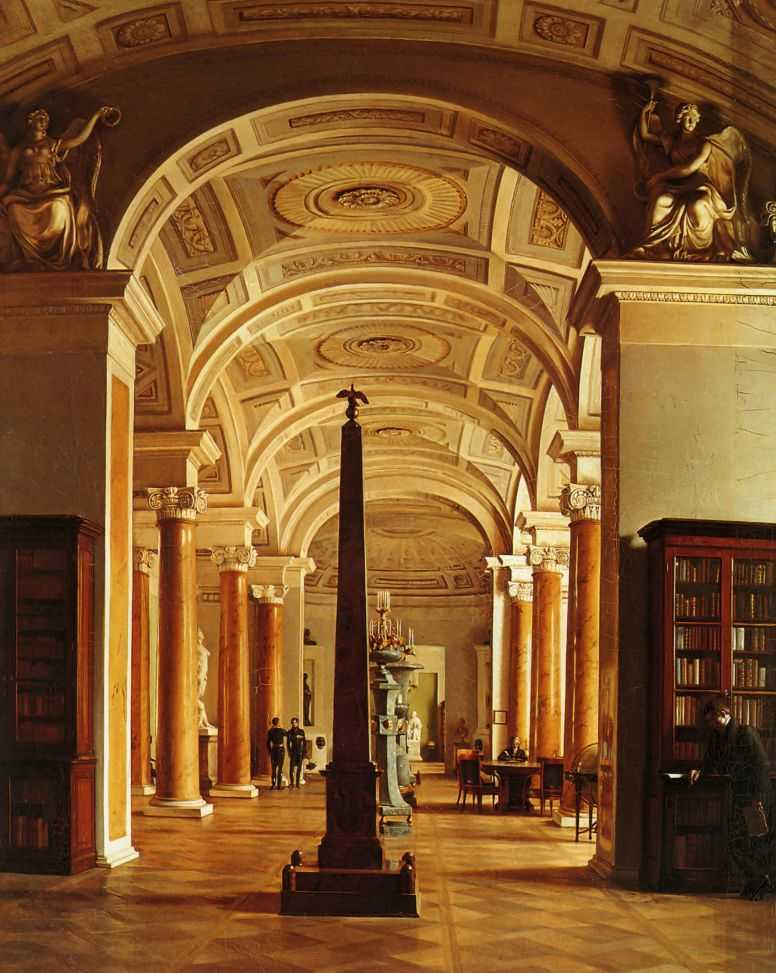
Interior view of the Hermitage Library

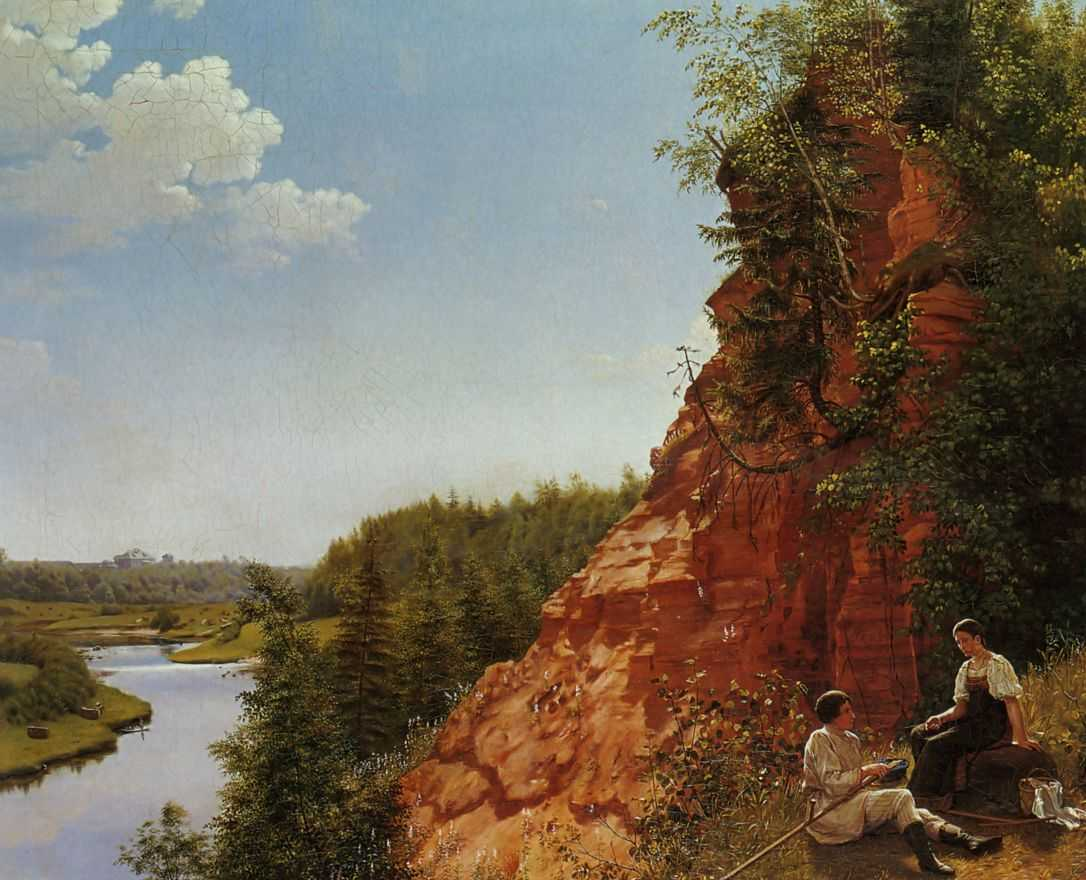
View of the Tosna River

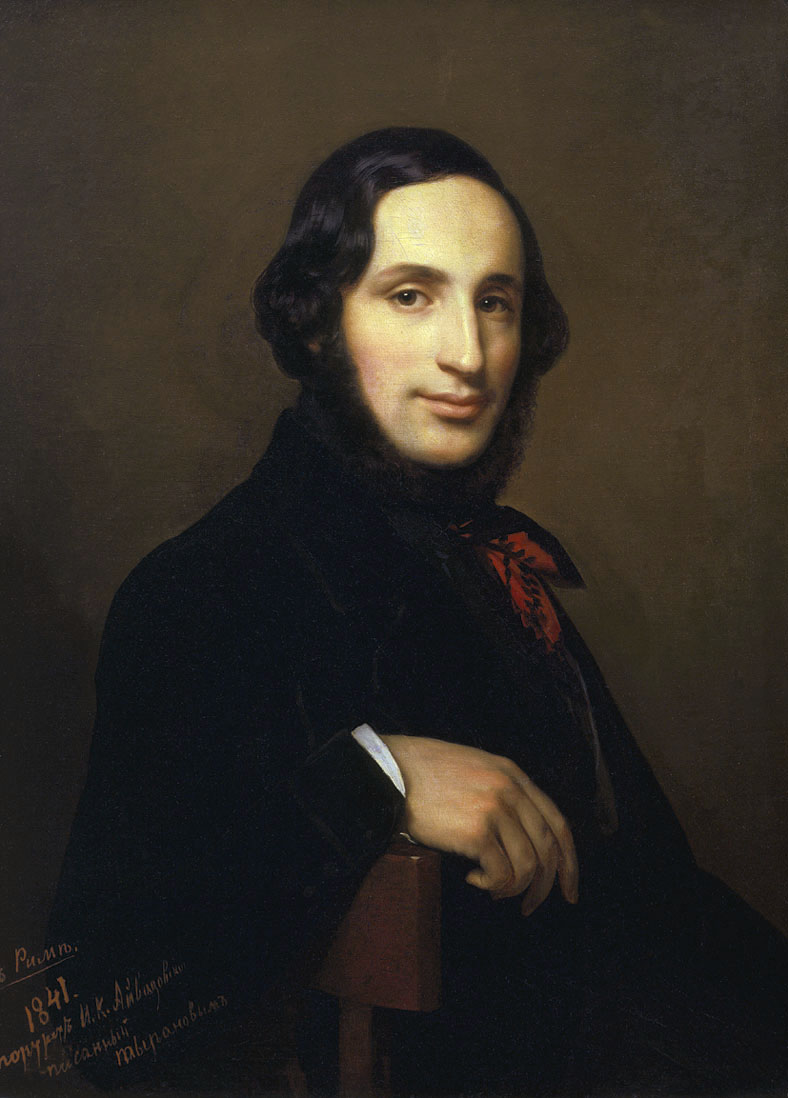
Ivan Aivazovsky

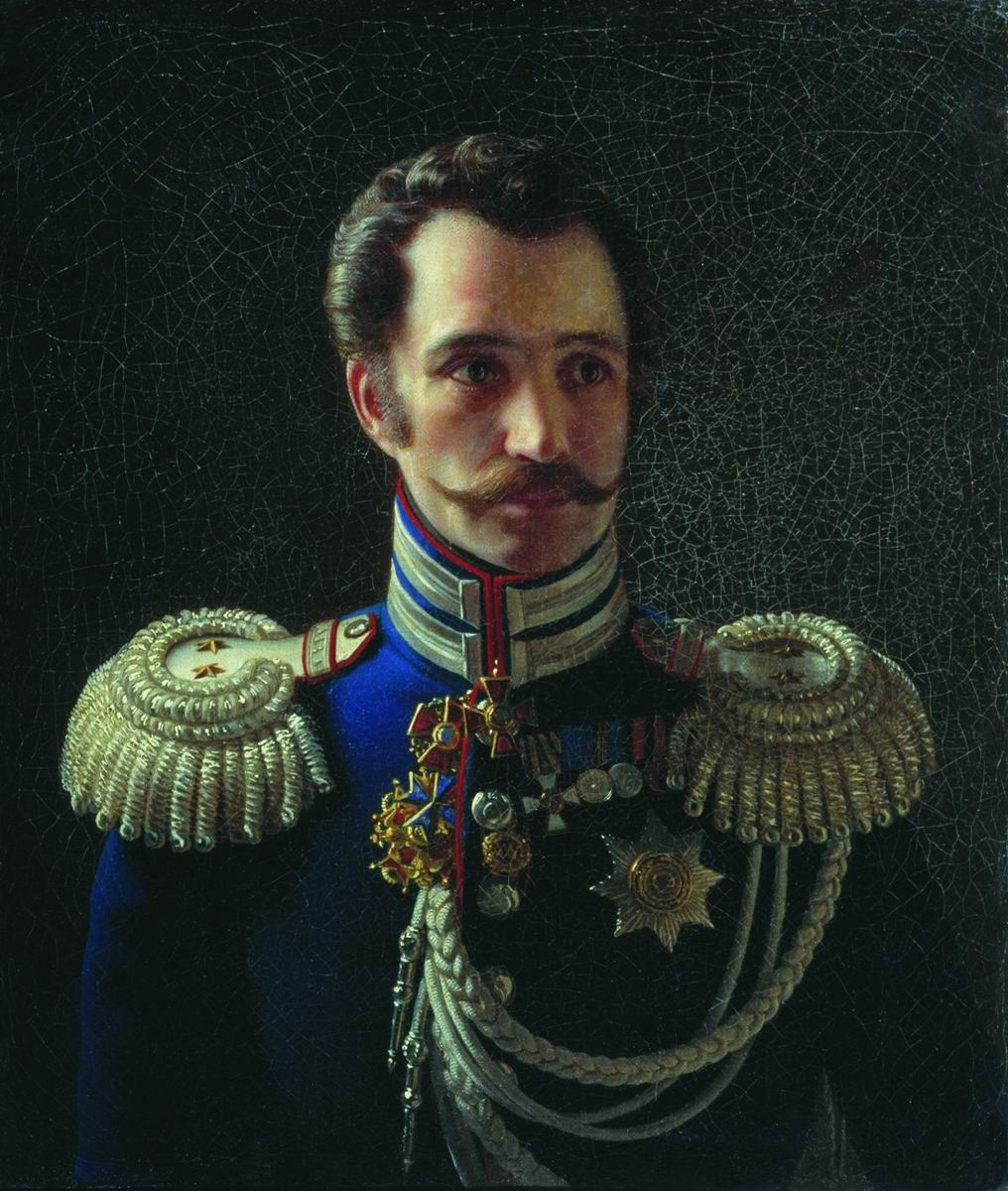
Leontiy Dubbelt

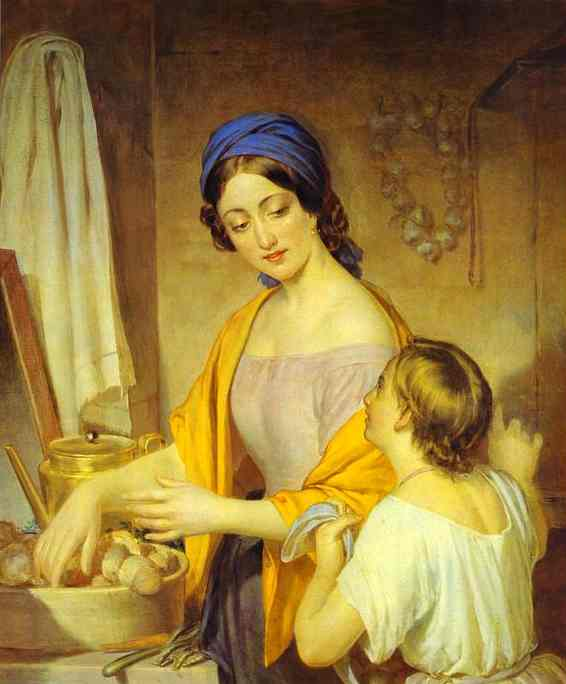
Young Housewife

== See also ==
- List of Russian artists
