= Alexander Tikhonov (publisher) =

Alexander Nikolaevich Tikhonov (Russian: Алекса́ндр Никола́евич Ти́хонов; 1 November [O.S. 20 October] 1880, Verkhneserginskii Zavod – 27 August 1956, Moscow) was a Russian Empire and Soviet writer and publisher. He was the publisher of Letopis (1915–1917), Novaya Zhizn (1917–1918).

In 1905 Tikhonov published a number of short stories, articles, and reviews. Then in 1908 he graduated from St. Petersburg Mining Institute. He was a friend of Maxim Gorky and was the editor of the fiction department of the Bolshevik newspapers Zvezda and Pravda.

After the October Revolution Tikhonov became the director of various publishing houses. From 1919 to 1924 he was director of the publishing house Vsemirnaya literatura (World Literature) under the People's Commissariat for Education. He was the editor of the magazines Vostok, Russian Contemporary, Contemporary West. Later he headed the publishing house of the Russian writers' artel Krug, the publishing house Federation, in 1930–1936 he was the editor-in-chief of the publishing house Academia, edited the series History of Factories and Plants, Life of Remarkable People and Historical Novels. During World War II he was director of the publishing house Sovetsky Pisatel.

Tikhonov died in Moscow in 1956 and was buried at the Novodevichy Cemetery.

A portrait of Tikhonov by the artist Yury Annenkov was sold for £4,002,500 at Christie's on 24 November 2014.
