= Novaya Zhizn (Mensheviks) =

Menshevik-run newspaper

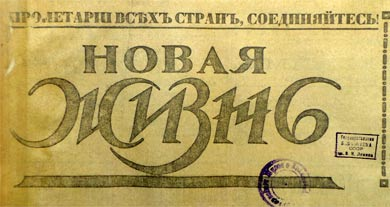
Novaya Zhizn masthead

Novaya Zhizn (Russian: Новая жизнь, New Life) was a daily newspaper published by a group of Mensheviks associated with the literary magazine Letopis, including Nikolai Sukhanov, Vladimir Bazarov, Stroev, Denitsky and A. N. Tikhonov. It was published in Petrograd from 18 April (1 May) 1917 until 16 July 1918 (with a total of 354 issues) and then in Moscow from June to July 1918, when it was closed down. The most known contributor was Maxim Gorky. The Swedish correspondent of the newspaper was Paul Olberg. Its run was interrupted in September 1917, when publication was suspended on the orders of the Russian Provisional Government. Before the October Revolution, Bolshevik leaders Zinoviev and Kamenev published their opposition in this newspaper, leaking the news and jeopardizing the coup d'etat. This move was later used against them by Stalin.

It should not be confused with the Bolsheviks' paper Novaya Zhizn, which was published for two months in 1905.
