= Alexander von Benckendorff =

Russian statesman (1781–1844)

Graf Alexander von Benckendorff
- Александр Христофорович Бенкендорф
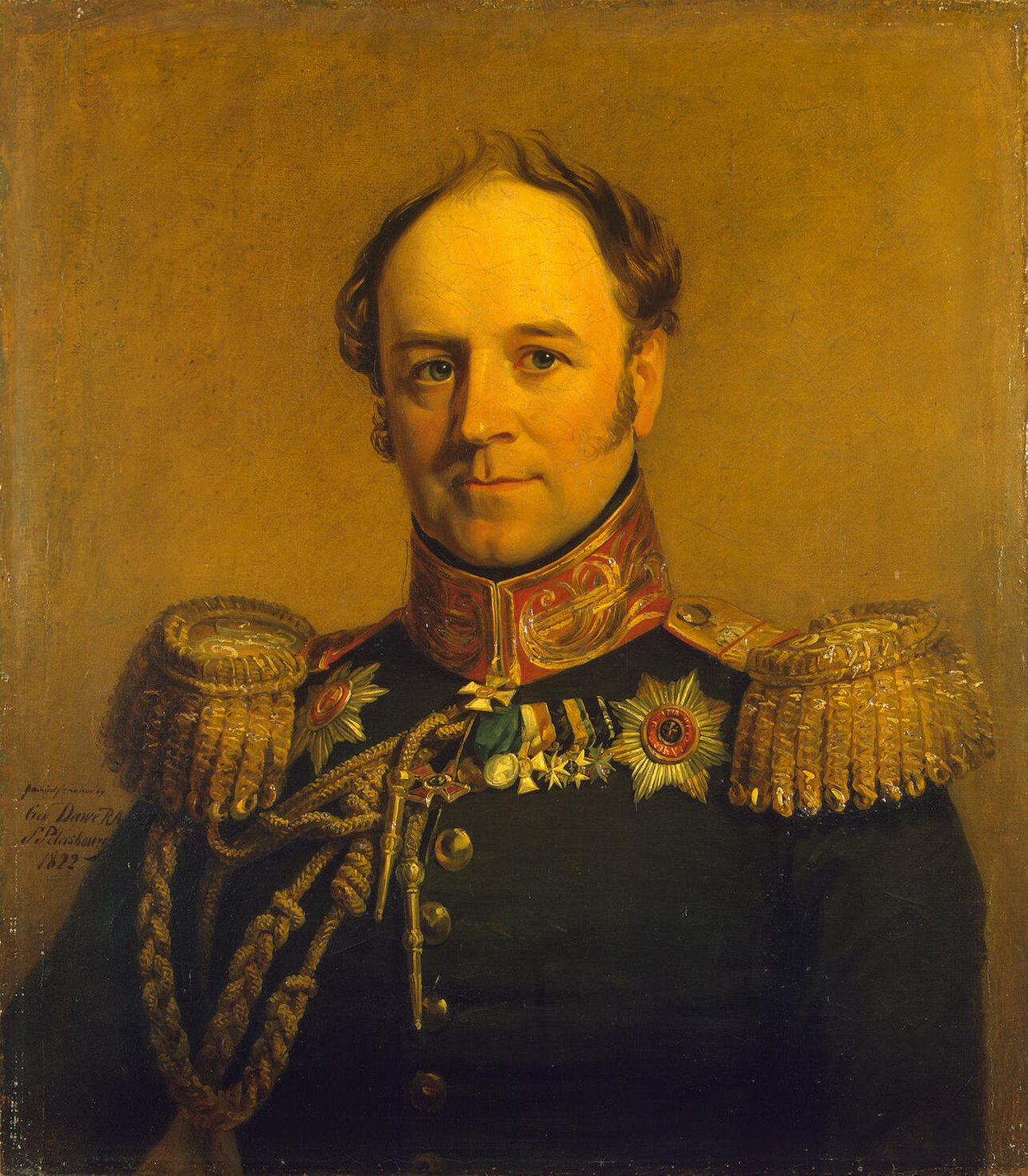
- Portrait by George Dawe, 1822
- Born: Konstantin Alexander Karl Wilhelm Christoph Graf von Benckendorff; 4 July 1781; Reval, Russian Empire
- Died: 5 October 1844 (aged 63); Dagö, Russian Empire
- Burial place: Keila-Joa
- Spouse: Elisaveta Donez-Sacharshevskaya
- Children: 3
- Military career
- Allegiance: Russia
- Branch: Cavalry
- Rank: General
- Unit: Semyonovsky Life-Guards Regiment
- Commands: Partisan (Cossack irregular) units
- Conflicts: French invasion of Russia
- Awards: Order of the White Eagle

Konstantin Alexander Karl Wilhelm Christoph Graf von Benckendorff (Russian: Александр Христофорович Бенкендорф, romanized: Aleksander Khristoforovich Benkendorf, 4 July [O.S. 23 June] 1781 or 1783 – 5 October [O.S. 23 September] 1844) was a Russian cavalry general and statesman of Baltic German descent. He was also the adjutant general of Alexander I and a commander of partisan (Kossak irregular) units during the French invasion of Russia. He is most frequently remembered for his later role, under Nicholas I, as the founding head of the Gendarmes and the secret police in Russia known as the Third Section.

== Family and career ==
Alexander von Benckendorff was born into the Benckendorff family of the Baltic German nobility in Reval (present-day Tallinn, Estonia), son of General Baron Christoph von Benckendorff (Friedrichsham, 12 January 1749 – Kolga, 10 June 1823), who served as the military governor of Livonia, and of his wife Baroness Anna Juliane Charlotte Schilling von Canstatt (Thalheim, 31 July 1744 – Riga, 11 March 1797), who held a high position at the Romanov court as senior lady-in-waiting and best friend of Empress Maria Fyodorovna (the second wife of the Emperor Paul). His paternal grandparents were Johann Michael von Benckendorff and his wife Sophie von Löwenstern. Alexander von Benckendorff's younger brother Konstantin von Benckendorff (1785–1828) became a general and diplomat, and his sister Dorothea von Lieven (1785–1857) a socialite and political force in London and Paris. His other sister, Maria von Benckendorff (1784–1841), married Ivan Georgievitch Sevitsch.

Having received his education at a Jesuit boarding school, Benckendorff started military service in 1798 in the Semyonovsky Life-Guards Regiment. Benckendorff then served as aide-de-camp to the czar. In 1803, while bearing the rank of Colonel he arrived in the Septinsular Republic. He was tasked with raising the nucleus of the Greek Legion, becoming the first commander of the unit. He then became the commander of the Souliote Legion component of the Greek Legion until his return to Russia in March 1805. Benckendorff had developed an amiable relationship with his Souliot subordinates, requesting the czar to be sent back to his previous unit. His request was denied, but Benckendorff remained a philhellene until the end of his life.

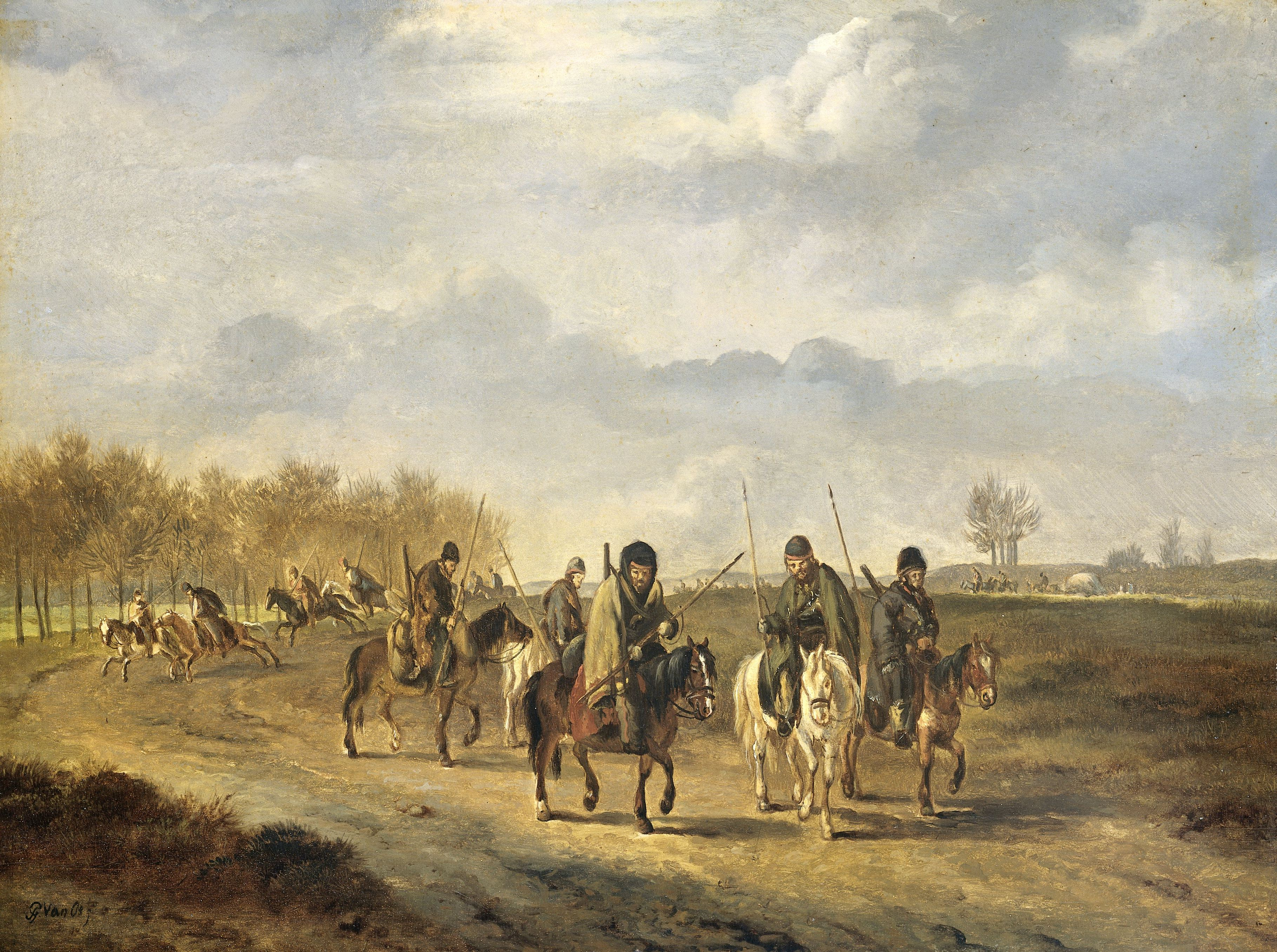
Kozakken op een landweg bij Bergen in Noord-Holland, 1813, SK-A-4067

During Napoleon's invasion of Russia in 1812, Benckendorff led the Velizh offensive, taking three French generals prisoner and more than 6000 lower ranks. When the Grande Armée left Moscow (October 1812), he became the commander of its garrison. In the foreign campaigns following, he defeated a French contingent at Tempelberg and became one of the first Russians to enter Berlin. He further distinguished himself at the Battle of Leipzig. On 2 November 1813 he arrived at Bad Bentheim. In 22 November he crossed the IJssel with a vanguard regiment from Bashkortostan (under Prince Fyodor Fyodorovich Gagarin). On 27 November he left Harderwijk to cross the Zuiderzee by boat. He consulted Krayenhoff. On 1 December the strategic Muiden Castle was taken. On 2 December he was received the townhall by William I of the Netherlands, the provisional king. Benckendorff passed Loevestein when he went to Tilburg and Breda. After British and Prussian forces arrived to succeed him, his unit proceeded to take Louvain and Mechelen, liberating 300 imprisoned Englishmen captured in Spain. On 1 February they surrounded Brussels. It seems he went to Düsseldorf alone. (At the end of March the French surrendered, which was followed by Treaty of Fontainebleau (1814))

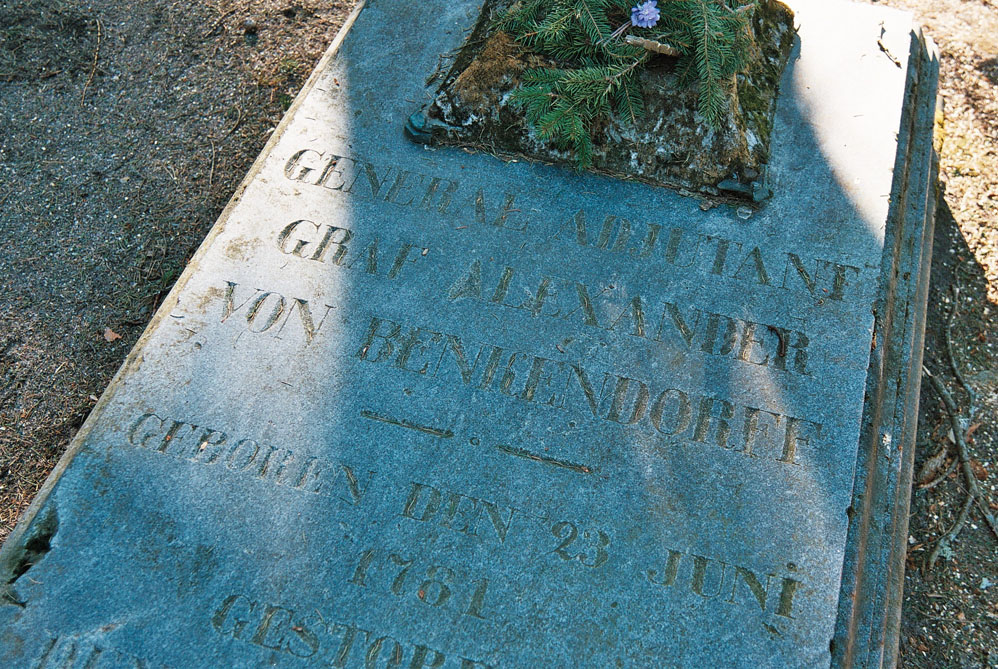
Grave of Alexander von Benckendorff in Keila-Joa, Estonia, 2009

In 1821 he attempted to warn Emperor Alexander I of the threat from the Decembrist clandestine organisation, but the Tsar ignored his note. After the 1825 Decembrist Revolt he sat on the investigation committee and lobbied for the establishment of a Corps of Gendarmes and of a secret police, the Third Section of the Imperial Chancellery. He served as the first Chief of Gendarmes and executive director of the Third Section from 1826 to 1844. Under his management, the Third Section established, inter alia, strict censorship over literature and theatre performances. His aim for Russian historiography was reflected in his statement that "Russia's past was admirable, its present is more than magnificent and as for its future — it is beyond anything that the boldest mind can imagine." In his rôle as Chief Censor, he became involved in the tragic death (1837) of Alexander Pushkin in an unnecessary duel, an involvement that for long made him an unmentionable in Russian historiography.

Yet by temperament, he was the very opposite of a proto-Dzerzhinsky or a proto-Beria. He suffered from a bizarre tendency to forget his own name, and periodically had to be reminded of it by consulting his own visiting card. From the mid-1830s, his family seat was the Gothic Revival manor, Schloss Fall (now Keila-Joa) near Tallinn in present-day Estonia. He died in Hiiumaa.

In 1817 Alexander von Benckendorff married Elisaveta Andreyevna Donets-Zacharzhevskaya (11 September 1788 – Berlin, 7 December 1857). The couple had three daughters:

- Countess Anna Alexandrovna Benckendorff (11 September 1818 – Lengyel, 19 November 1900), married to Count Rudolf Appony de Nagy-Appony
- Countess Maria Alexandrovna Benckendorff (Saint Petersburg, 24 May 1820 – Rome, 4 November 1880) married in Saint Petersburg on 12 January 1838 as his first wife Prince Grigori Petrovich Volkonsky (Saint Petersburg, 28 March 1808 – Menton (Nice), 7 May 1882)
- Countess Sophia Alexandrovna Benckendorff (Keila-Joa, 2 August 1825 – Paris, 5 March 1875), married to Pavel Grigorievich Demidov and to Prince Sergei Viktorovich Kotchubey.

== Benckendorff's notes ==
A recent Russian publication reveals his own view of his early life: Zapiski Benkendorfa: Otechestvennaia voina; 1813 god: Osvobozhdenie Niderlandov (Benkendorff's Notes. The Patriotic War; 1813: The Liberation of the Netherlands): Yaziki slavyanskikh kul'tur, Moscow, 2001. ISBN 5-7859-0228-1. This book reproduces two sections of Benckendorff's private notes that had not seen publication since 1903, very lively on the events of the Napoleonic war, correspondences with his contemporaries, Bagration and others, and associated regimental histories.

According to that book, Benckendorff kept personal notes and diaries throughout his life. One additional source for his notes, in this case from the late 1830s, can be found in volume 91 of the journal Istoricheskii vestnik for 1903.

== Sources ==
- Mikaberidze, Alexander (2005). Russian Officer Corps of the Revolutionary and Napoleonic Wars. Casemate Publishers. ISBN 978-1611210026.
- Pappas, Nicholas Charles (2021). "European Officers and the Mainland Irregular Forces on the Ionian Islands, 1798–1814: A Comparison of Command and Tactics" (PDF). Athens Journal of Mediterranean Studies. 7 (2): 119–142. doi:10.30958/ajms.7-2-3. ISSN 2407-9480. S2CID 233819074.
