= Ivan Borodin =

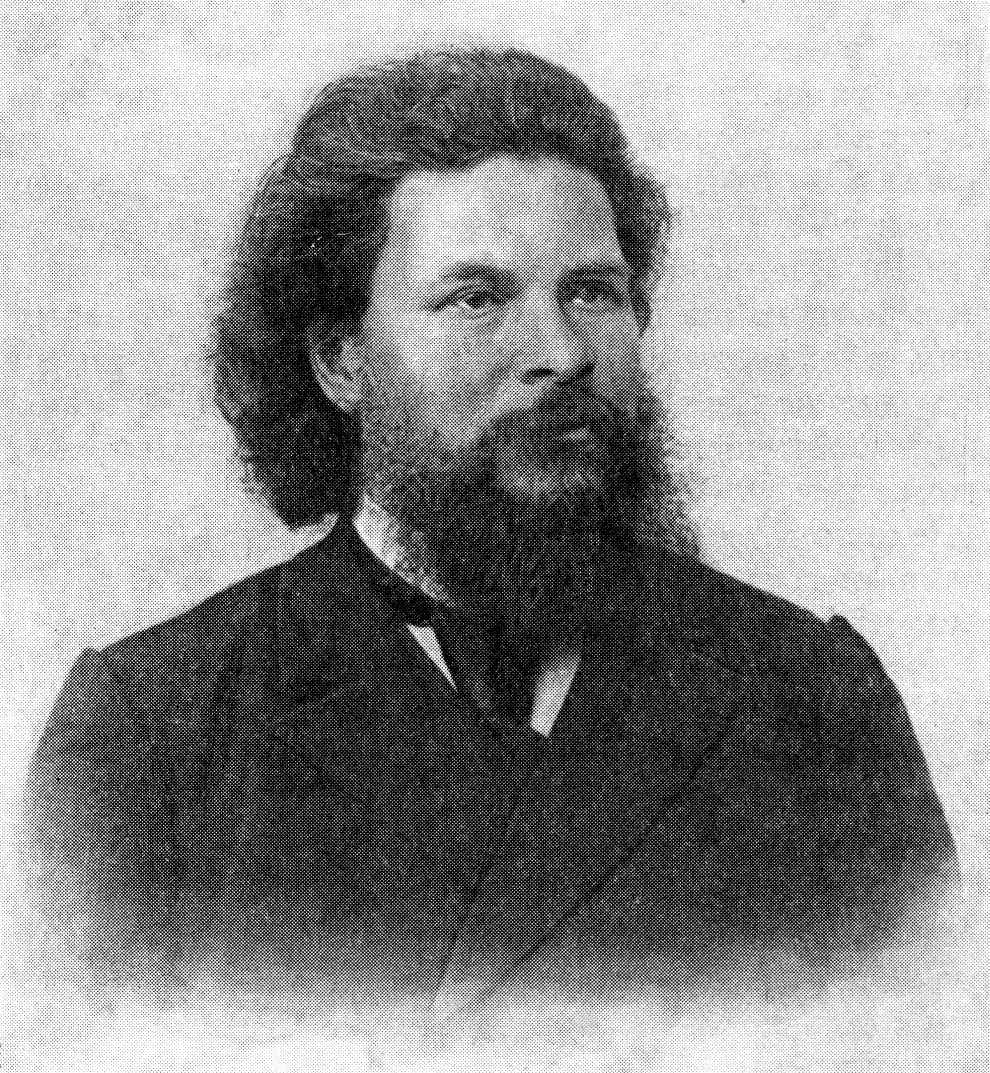
Ivan P. Borodin

Ivan Parfenievich Borodin (Иван Парфеньевич Бородин; 30 January 1847 - 5 March 1930) was a Russian botanist, academician, and the founding president of the Russian Botanical Society. A number of plants, including the genus Borodinia, are named after him.

Borodin, a pupil of Andrey Beketov and Andrey Famintsyn, is credited with the discovery (1880–1882) of crystallizing chlorophyll. Richard Willstätter, a famous authority on chlorophyll chemistry, named this substance Borodin crystals. From 1902, he was an academician of the Russian Academy of Sciences. From 1902, he served as the director of the Botanical Museum of the Academy of Sciences.

During the First Russian Revolution, Borodin publicly criticized absolute monarchy. On Borodin's initiative, the Russian Botanical Society was established in 1915, and he served as its president until the end of his life. From October 1917 to May 1919, I. P. Borodin was the vice-president of the Russian Academy of Sciences. From 1917 to 1919, he was the director of the Petrograd Botanical Garden.

In the 1920s, Borodin opposed the election of prominent Bolsheviks as members of the Academy of Sciences. He was one of the first Russians to campaign for the protection of natural spaces. His daughters were the theologian Myrrha Lot-Borodine (the wife of Ferdinand Lot) and the historian Inna Lubimenko.
