= Boris Avilov =

Russian Marxist (1874–1938)

Boris Vasilievich Avilov (1874–1938) was a Russian Marxist who left the Bolsheviks as he did not go along with their support for Lenin. He joined Vladimir Bazarov, Gavriil Lindov and others to form the United Social-Democrat Internationalists. They set out to bring together the Menshevik-Internationalists with the more moderate Bolsheviks into a new group. Despite always being very small, the group wielded a certain influence through the editorial line of their widely-read newspaper Novaya zhizn in 1917–18. At the Second All-Russia Congress of Soviets in October 1917 the group remained at the congress although the Mensheviks and Socialist-Revolutionaries walked out in protest over the Bolshevik seizure of power.
