= Alexander Drenteln =

- Александр Романович Дрентельн
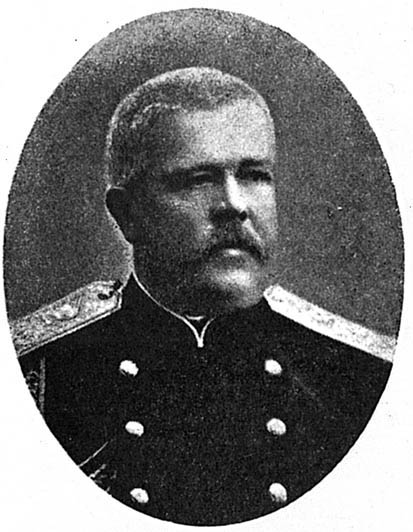
- Born: 1820
- Died: 1888 (aged 67–68)
- Military career
- Allegiance: Russian
- Rank: General
- Commands: Third Section of His Imperial Majesty's Chancellery
- Awards: Order of Saint Stanislaus (House of Romanov)

Alexander Romanovich Drenteln (Russian: Алекса́ндр Рома́нович Дре́нтельн) (1820–1888) was a Russian general.

He held the rank of General of the Infantry, and held the positions of:

- Adjutant General of the H. I. M. Retinue,
- Chief of Gendarmes,
- the last Executive Head of the Third Section of His Imperial Majesty's Chancellery (1878–1880),
- Commander of the Odessa Military District (1880–1881).

On March 25, 1879, he was the target of a failed assassination attempt by Russian nihilists.

== Awards ==
- Order of Saint Stanislaus (House of Romanov), 1st class, 1863
- Order of Saint Anna, 1st class, 1868
