= Myrrha Lot-Borodine =

Russian-French scholar of medieval literature (1882–1954)

Myrrha Lot-Borodine (1882–1954) was a Russian-born French academic who specialized in French and Anglo-Saxon medieval literature and Eastern Orthodox theology. She was the daughter of Ivan Parfenievich Borodin and married Ferdinand Lot. They had three daughters. The eldest, Irène, married Boris Vildé. The historian Inna Lubimenko was her sister.

== Works ==
- La Femme dans l'œuvre de Chrétien de Troyes, (A. Picard et fils, 1909)
- Le roman russe contemporain (1900–1912), (Libraire Léopold Cerf, 1912)
- (with Ferdinand Lot) Etude sur le Lancelot en prose, (H. Champion, 1918)
- Trois essais sur le roman de Lancelot du Lac et la Quête du Saint Graal, (H. Champion, 1919)
- Tristan et Lancelot, Imprimerie Peyriller, Rouchon et Gamon, 1924
- Nicolas Cabasilas: un maître de la spiritualité byzantine au XIV. Siècle, (Éditions de l'Orante, 1958)
- De l'amour profane à l'amour sacré, (Nizet, 1961)
- La déification de l'homme selon la doctrine des pères grecs, with a preface by Jean Daniélou, (Cerf, 1970).
