= Ferdinand Lot =

French historian (1866–1952)

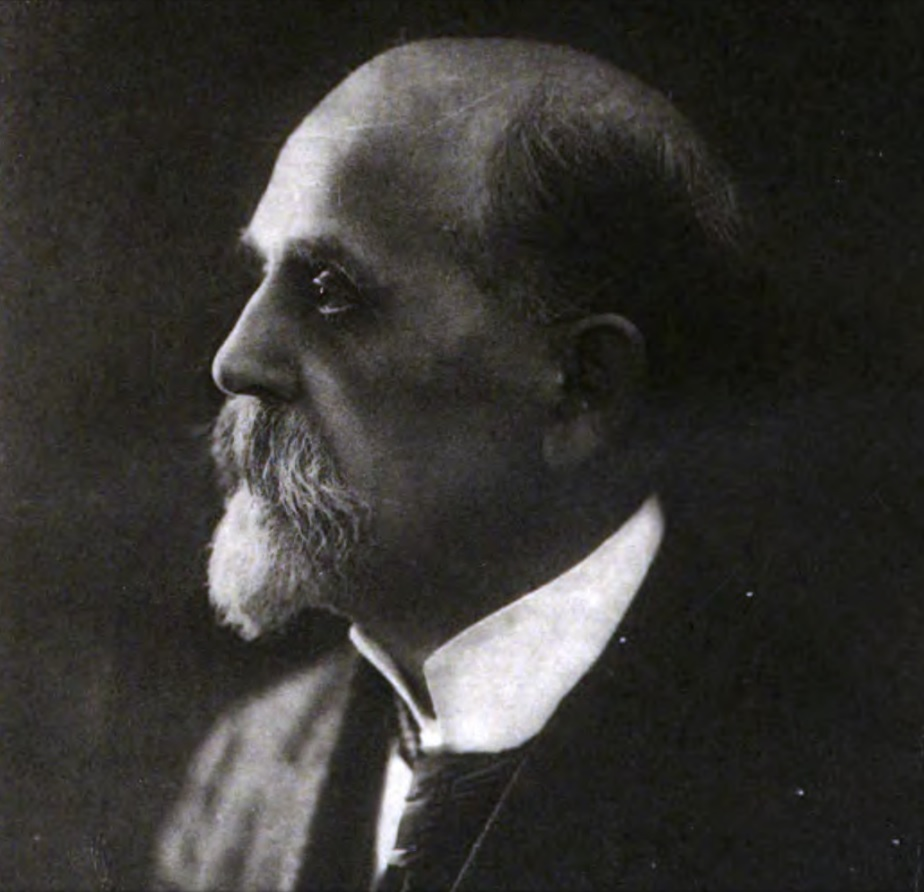
Ferdinand Lot

Ferdinand Victor Henri Lot (Le Plessis Piquet, 20 September 1866 – Fontenay-aux-Roses, 20 July 1952) was a French historian and medievalist. His masterpiece, The End of the Ancient World and the Beginnings of the Middle Ages (1927), presents an alternative account of the fall of the Roman Empire than does Edward Gibbon's Decline and Fall of the Roman Empire, which had set the tone for Enlightenment scholarship in blaming the fall of classical civilization on Christianity.

Lot was a member of the Académie des Inscriptions et Belles-Lettres, part of the Institut de France, and an honorary professor at the Sorbonne.

Lot married the Russian-French medieval scholar Myrrha Lot-Borodine in 1909.

== Select bibliography ==
- The End of the Ancient World and the Beginning of the Middle Ages. London: Kegan Paul, 1931. (La Fin du monde antique et le début du Moyen Age.)
- La France, des origines à la guerre de cent ans. (Paris: Gallimard, 1941).
- L'Art militaire et les armées au Moyen Âge (Paris, 1946).
- La Gaule, Les fondements ethniques, sociaux et politiques de la nation française. (Paris: Fayard, 1947).
