= Histoire, Économie et Société =

- Discipline: History
- Language: French

Publication details
- History: 1908–present
- Publisher: Armand Colin (France)
- Frequency: Quarterly

Standard abbreviations
- ISO 4: Hist. Écon. Soc.

Indexing
- ISSN: 0752-5702 (print); 1777-5906 (web)

Histoire, Économie et Société is a French history journal. It was established in 1908 as the Revue d'histoire des doctrines économiques et sociales and became the Revue d'histoire économique et sociale in 1913. It acquired its current name in 1982. It is indexed by ABC-CLIO, FRANCIS (INIST), Ingenta, and JournalSeek.
