= Special Corps of Gendarmes =

Security police in the Russian Empire

Separate Corps of Gendarmes Отдельный корпус жандармов

Agency overview
- Formed: 1827
- Dissolved: 1917
- Employees: 5,200

Jurisdictional structure
- Operations jurisdiction: Russian Empire
- General nature: Gendarmerie

Operational structure
- Overseen by: Guberniya

The Separate Corps of Gendarmes (Russian: Отдельный корпус жандармов) was the uniformed security police of the Imperial Russian Army in the Russian Empire during the 19th and early 20th centuries. Its main responsibilities were law enforcement and state security.

The responsibilities of the Gendarmes also included the execution of court orders, pursuit of fugitives, riot control, and detainment of "unusual" criminals. Gendarmes could also be assigned to assist local police and officials.

== Establishment ==
The precursors of the Corps were the Imperial Army Gendarmerie regiment (formed in 1815 and based on the Borisoglebsk Dragoon Regiment) and Gendarmerie units of the Separate Corps of the Internal Guards (raised 1811). Following the 1825 Decembrist revolt, the new Russian Emperor, Nicholas I, established the office of the Chief of Gendarmes in July 1826 and appointed General Count Alexander Benkendorf to it; all of the gendarmes were subordinate to the Chief. Benkendorf was also appointed executive director of the newly formed Third Section of the Imperial Chancellery although the office of the Head of the Third Section did not formally merge with that of the Chief of Gendarmes until 1839.

== Organisation ==
In 1836, the Gendarmerie of the Internal Guards was transformed into the Separate Corps of Gendarmes, under the Chief of Gendarmes. The Commander of the Corps and Chief of Staff of the Corps were also Directors of the Third Section under the executive director. The Corps was divided into seven territorial Districts, six of them located in Russia and one in the Kingdom of Poland, each having a Directorate. The Main Directorate, along with additional Gubernial Directorates, was also created. The Army's Gendarmerie regiment joined the Corps in 1842.

As of 1867 statute, the Corps consisted of:

- Main Directorate
- Surveillance staff
- Caucasus, Warsaw and Siberia Districts
- Gubernial Directorates (56)
- Uyezd Directorates (50)
- Railroad Directorates
- St. Petersburg, Moscow and Warsaw divisions
- Mounted units (13)

== Expanded role ==
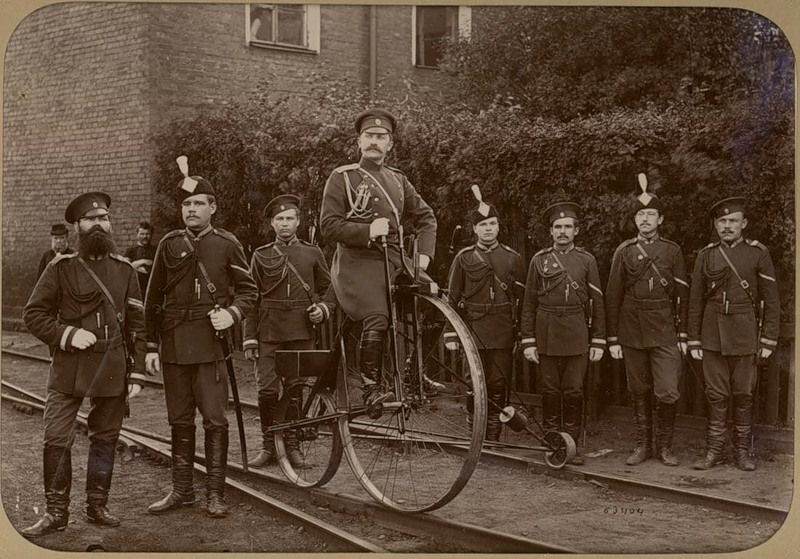
Russian Gendarmes, circa 1890

In 1871, the Gendarmes acquired the right to investigate both political and criminal cases, as the judicial investigators were dismissed.

Only the most competent army officers holding noble ranks could be appointed to the Corps of Gendarmes. In August 1880, both the Third Section and the Separate Corps of Gendarmes came under the authority of the Minister of Internal Affairs, as proposed by Count Loris-Melikov. The Minister of Internal Affairs took up the office of Chief of Gendarmes, and the Commander of the Corps became his Deputy. Many Gendarme officers were transferred to the new Department of Police.

Following the 1902 assassination of MVD Minister Dmitry Sergeyevich Sipyagin, the state security authorities of the Gendarmerie Directorates was transferred to the Okhrana and counterintelligence units of the General Staff and the Department of Police.

== Disbandment ==
During the February 1917 Russian Revolution, Gendarmes stationed at Kronstadt remained loyal to the tsarist regime, fired on demonstrators and were later imprisoned for trial. On 17 March [O.S. 4 March] 1917 the Corps of Gendarmes was formally abolished by the order of the Provisional Committee of the State Duma, along with the regular tsarist police.

== Directors ==
- Alexander von Benckendorff (1826–1844, its founder and first chief)
- Vasily Andreyevich Dolgorukov (?–?)
- Aleksandr Potapov (1861–1864)
- Pyotr Andreyevich Shuvalov (1866–?)
- Alexander Drenteln (1878–1880)
- Pyotr Dmitrievich Sviatopolk-Mirskii (1900–1905)

== Ranks and uniforms ==
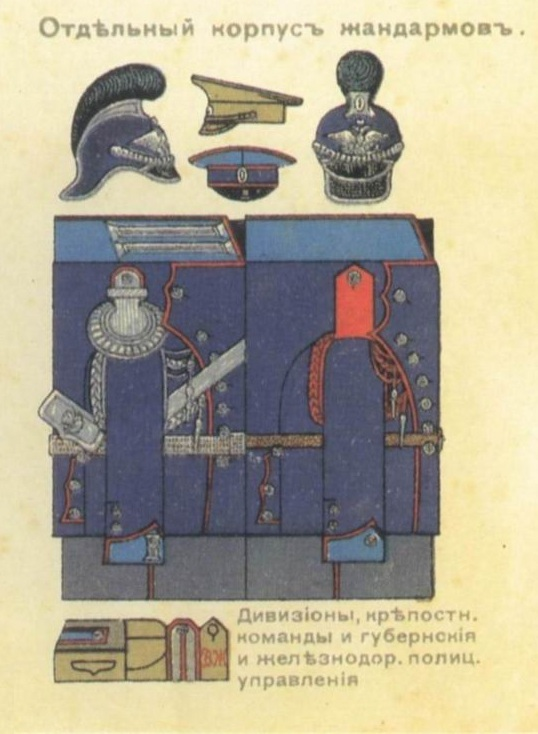
Uniform of gendarmes 1911

The Gendarmes used cavalry ranks of the Russian military ranks system introduced in 1826. Most branches of the Separate Corps wore light blue uniforms in contrast to the dark green of the regular army and police. Gendarmes of the Railroad Directorates were, however, distinguished by dark blue tunics. Khaki-grey service uniforms were worn for ordinary duties after 1909.

The 1909–1914 dress uniforms shown opposite are derived from the detailed set of Russian Army coloured plates prepared by Colonel V.K. Shenk and published by the Imperial War Ministry in 1911.

=== Rank insignia, 1884–1907 ===
Commissioned officer ranks

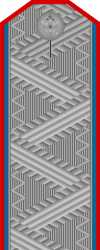
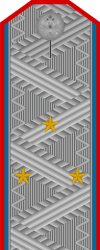
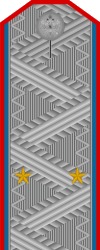
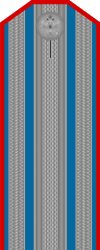
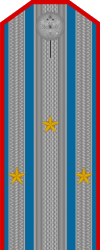
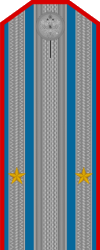
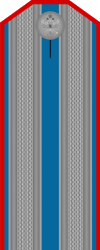
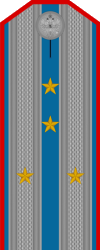
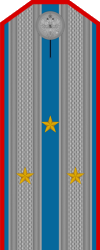
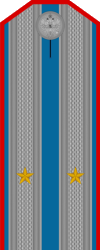
Rank group	General / flag officers			Senior officers			Junior officers
	Генерала-от-кавалерии; Generala-ot-kavalerii	Генера́л-лейтена́нт; Generál-leytenánt	Генера́л-майо́р; Generál-mayór	Полко́вник; Polkóvnik	Подполко́вник; Podpolkóvnik	Майо́р; Majór	Ротмистр; Rotmistr	Штабс-ротмистр; Shtabs-rotmistr	Поручик; Poruchik	Корнет; Kornet

Other ranks

Rank group	Senior NCOs			Junior NCOs	Enlisted
	Вахмистр; Vakhmistr	Ста́рший унтер-офицер Stárshiy unter-ofitser	Мла́дший унтер-офицер Mládshiy unter-ofitser	Ефре́йтор; Efréĭtor	жандарм Zhandarm

== See also ==
- Jailbirds of Kerensky
- Ministry of Police of Imperial Russia
- National Guard of Russia
- Police Department of Russia
- Internal Troops
