= Archievenblad =

Dutch academic journal

- Discipline: Archival science
- Language: Dutch

Publication details
- History: Nederlandsch Archievenblad (1892–1996), Archievenblad (1997–present)
- Publisher: Koninklijke Vereniging van Archivarissen; Vereniging van Archivarissen (Netherlands)
- Frequency: 6

Standard abbreviations
- ISO 4: Archievenblad

Indexing
- ISSN: 1385-4186
- LCCN: 92055790 sv 92055790
- OCLC no.: 782247753
- ISSN: 0028-2049

Links
- Journal homepage; Online access

Archievenblad is a Dutch journal of archival science. Written in Dutch, it is the official journal of the Koninklijke Vereniging van Archivarissen in Nederland (Royal Association of Archivists in the Netherlands), and is free to members.

== History ==
The journal was formed by a merger of Nieuws van Archieven and Nederlandsch Archievenblad, which was first published in 1892, after the Netherlands Society of Archivists was founded in 1891. The inaugural issue of Nederlandsch Archievenblad set forth several basic principles which later formed the foundation of the Manual for the Arrangement and Description of Archives (1898), which was translated into German, Italian, French, and English, and was widely regarded as "the bible of modern archivists".

By 1911, the Nederlandsch Archievenblad had established an international reputation for discussing "the most varied and complex archival questions". The Archievenblad was published without a break during the two World Wars. After the First World War, Archievenblad was the forum for intense debate about whether archivists, as a profession, should be undertaking their own historical research.

== Content ==
Although the format of the early volumes of the Nederlandsch Archievenblad varied somewhat, by the time it published its 45th volume in 1938, the structure of the series was generally consistent. Each issue had an "official" section featuring reports, archival laws, and the association's constitution; once a year, it also published a list of members. The "nonofficial" section regularly featured articles and contributions; at times, it also included necrologies, book reviews, and short news items.

By 1990, Het Nederlands Archievenblad was published quarterly. According to an article by Dutch Association of Archivists (VAN) president Frank Keverling Buisman marking the organisation's centennial, the journal "[provided] a lively forum for debate on professional and technical matters", in addition to reporting on the association's activities and research. He also noted that a "longstanding tradition" was the publication of the presidential address of the Dutch Association of Archivists (VAN).
