= Domestic Archives =

Domestic Archives (Отечественные архивы)
- Language: Russian
- Edited by: Bondareva Tatyana Ivanovna

Publication details
- History: 1923
- Publisher: Independent board of the journal (Russia)
- Frequency: Bi-monthly
- Open access: No

Standard abbreviations
- ISO 4: Domest. Arch.

Indexing
- ISSN: 0869-4427
- OCLC no.: 470459191

Links
- Journal homepage

Domestic Archives (Отечественные архивы) is a peer-reviewed academic journal of archival science published in Russia.

It was published as Архивное дело (Archival

Информационный бюллетень Главного архивного управления МВД СССР (Information Bulletin of the Main Archival Directorate of the Ministry of Internal Affairs of the USSR), and from 1959 to 1965 Вопросы архивоведения (Issues of Archival Studies). From 1966 to 1991 it was Советские архивы (Soviet Archives.
