= Vladimir Nikolaevich Lyubimenko =

Russian and Soviet botanist and academician

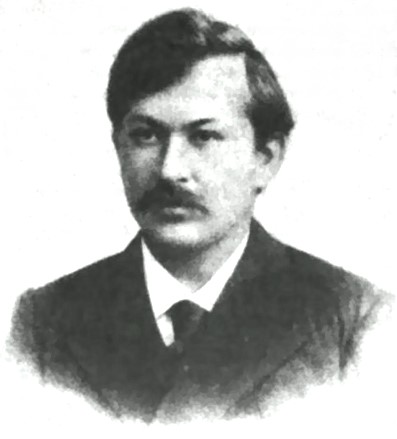
Vladimir Nikolaevich Lyubimenko

Vladimir Nikolaevich Lyubimenko (1873–1937) was a Russian and Soviet botanist and academician who worked in the Nikitsky Botanical Garden in Crimea. He researched and wrote on the process of photosynthesis in shade-tolerant plants.

His wife was the historian Inna Lubimenko (1878–1959).

== Selected publications ==
- "On culturing of medicinal herbs on the southern coast of Crimea", Vestnik Russkoy Flory, 1915 (3), pp. 144–50.
- Tabachnaya Promyshlennost v Rossii. Petrograd, 1916.
- Syedobnye Dikorastushchiye Rasteniya Severnoy Polosy Rossii. 2 vols. Petrograd, 1918. (With N. A. Monteverde and A. F. Sulima-Samoylo)
- Chay i Yego Kultura v Rossii. Petrograd, 1919.
