= Third Section of His Imperial Majesty's Own Chancellery =

Police department in Imperial Russia

Coordinates: 59.9366°N 30.3431°E

The Third Section of His Imperial Majesty's Own Chancellery (Russian: Tretiye Otdeleniye, or III отделение собственной Е.И.В канцелярии III otdeleniye sobstvennoy E.I.V. kantselyarii; in full: Третье отделение Собственной Его Императорского Величества канцелярии Tretye otdeleniye Sobstvennoy Yego Yimperatorskogo Velichestva kantselyarii, sometimes translated as Third Department) was a secret-police department set up in Imperial Russia. As a successor organisation to the Tayny Prikaz of 1654 to 1676, to the Privy Chancellery of 1686 to 1801, and to the Specialty Chancellery, it effectively served as the Imperial régime's secret police for much of its existence. The organization was relatively small. When founded in July 1826 by Emperor Nicholas I it included only sixteen investigators. Their number increased to forty in 1855. The Third Section disbanded in 1880, replaced by the Police Department and by the Okhrana.

== Creation and purpose ==
The Decembrist Revolt of December 14, 1825, shook Emperor Nicholas I's (r. 1825-1855) confidence in his control and led him to desire an effective tool against sedition and revolution. Created by imperial decree on June 25, 1826, Emperor Nicholas' thirtieth birthday, the Third Section was Nicholas' personal police force. Although Nicholas gave Count Alexander Benckendorff, the first Head Controller of the Section, few specific instructions, the Emperor intended the Third Section to act as Russia's “moral and political guardian.” Just as Russia had ambassadors to other nations keeping the Emperor apprised of political conditions abroad, Nicholas saw the officers of the Third Section, the Gendarmes, as domestic ambassadors who listened, if surreptitiously, to the political discussions of everyday Russians. As ambassadors and moral guardians, the Gendarmerie was ostensibly tasked with guiding Russians along the political path the Emperor desired; however, the Gendarmerie gradually became a counter-revolutionary force rather than a group of “moral physicians.”

Count Alexander Benckendorff was the Head Controller of the Section from 1826. He was the person who tried to warn Alexander I of the Decembrist plot; thus Nicholas I saw him as the perfect head of the secret force. He also served as Chief of Gendarmes, but the office of the Executive Director of the Third Section was not formally merged with the Chief of Gendarmes until 1829.

== Tasks and responsibilities ==
This list enumerates the functions of the Third Section as Emperor Nicholas I described to the Director of the Special Chancellery of the Ministry of Internal Affairs:

1. All orders and announcements in all instances of the higher police.
2. Information concerning the number of various sects and heretical religious groups existing within the state.
3. Information concerning the distribution of counterfeit money, stamps, documents, etc., the investigation and further prosecution of which is to remain in the jurisdiction of the Ministries of Finance and Internal Affairs.
4. Detailed information concerning all persons under police surveillance, as ordered.
5. The exile and arrest of suspicious or dangerous persons.
6. Economic and supervisory administration of all places of imprisonment in which state prisoners are kept.
7. All orders and instructions with regard to foreigners living in Russia, travelling in the country, or leaving it.
8. Information concerning all events, without exception.
9. Statistical information relating to the police.

=== Surveillance ===
In the wake of the Decembrist Revolt, Emperor Nicholas wanted above all to know what his people were thinking about his regime and to remain apprised of any growing conspiracies in order to stop them before they caused potential unrest. Thus, the main task of the Third Section was surveillance. In 1836, a year with no foreign wars that might increase domestic sedition, the Third Section had 1,631 individuals under surveillance, 1,080 of those for political reasons; this included everything from monitoring the actions of potentially dangerous civilians to assigning Third Section agents to pose as officials inside Russian governmental agencies to surveil senior officers and statesmen. Anyone under the Emperor could be watched since the Third Section answered to Nicholas alone. At one point in the early 1850s, Third Section agents were even detailed to monitor every move of Grand Duke Konstantin Nikolaievich, Chief of Russia's Navy and Nicholas' second son. However, since the agents of the Third Section generally surveilled only powerful nobles or bureaucrats or those suspected of treasonous acts, the Section's reports to Emperor Nicholas, which had been intended to keep the Emperor accurately informed, gave Nicholas an incomplete view of the general mood of his people.

=== Censorship ===
In addition to monitoring actions and oral speech, the Third Section also played an important role in censorship of printed works. Although the Ministry of Education created the censorship laws and did the busywork of searching for objectionable material, Ministry censors were instructed to inform the Third Section of authors who violated the regulations. However, rather than wait to surveil only authors who had violated the censorship regulations, Third Section agents preferred to surveil certain authors and then, once suspicious activity was spotted, reject that author's material even if it had passed the censors. In 1832, the Third Section gained the ability to reject publishers or editors of new periodicals on moral grounds, effectively putting the section in control of new periodicals, which could be established only with the Emperor's approval. In the early 1830s, the Section attempted to apply its mandate to be a moral guide to Russians by encouraging publications it deemed good for the Empire rather than just punishing the authors of damaging works. For example, when Mikhail Pogodin wrote an article supporting Russia's historic right to Lithuania, the Third Section offered him a reward.

=== Propaganda ===
One practical project that the Third Section attempted as part of its duties as moral guardian of Russia was not only to inform the Emperor of the public's opinion but also to try to influence that opinion in the Imperial regime's favor, both in Russia and abroad. Indeed, one of Count Benckendorff's first actions as Head Controller had been the creation and distribution in English, French, and German translations of an account of the Decembrist Revolt that presented the Emperor's actions in a positive light to western Europeans. The Third Section also employed Russians living abroad not only to keep the Section apprised of foreign politics but also to write responses to attacks on Russia published in the foreign press. Additionally, the Third Section used any publications under its direct control, like the Polish newspaper Tygodnik Peterburgski (Petersburg Weekly), to publish pro-Russian articles in other European nations. However little success the Third Section's modest propaganda efforts met in foreign presses, it had even less success domestically: rather than print pro-Nicholas propaganda of its own to improve Russians’ opinions of the Emperor, the Third Section resorted to pushing even broader censorship of Russian periodicals, threatening in 1848 to punish publishers not only for running seditious articles but even if the publication's “tone and tendency” was not positive enough. During the series of European revolutions of 1848, the Third Section forbade any Russian periodical from printing any article of news describing a European nation facing a revolution.

== Failures and dissolution ==
While the Third Section served as the Tsar's deputy for 55 years, the organization had its share of failures and administrative shortcomings. For its entire history, the Third Section's surveillance had been imperfect; not only did the gendarmes often fail to surveil people who were actually plotting, in one case, they even allowed Sophia Perovsky, who later led the successful plot to assassinate Tsar Alexander II (r. 1855-1881), to escape from them at a railroad station.

Although the Third Section was dissolved on August 8, 1880, nearly seven months before Tsar Alexander's assassination on March 2, 1881, there were several assassinations and attempted assassinations which did occur under the Section's watch. Gregory Goldenberg assassinated the Governor of Kharkov, Prince Dmitry Kropotkin, on February 9, 1879, under the Third Section's eye. Even General Drenteln, the Head Controller of the Third Section, was nearly assassinated on March 13 of that same year. These failures aside, perhaps the most damaging to the Third Section's reputation was its failure to stop, or even to detect, the six attempts to assassinate Tsar Alexander II, including the successful attempt in 1881. The first failed attempt on the Tsar's life, by the nihilist Dmitry Karakozov on April 4, 1866, led Prince Dolgorukov, the head of the section, to resign out of shame for his and the Section's failure to protect Alexander II.

There was a second attempt on Alexander II's life in Paris in 1867, but it was not until the third attempt, this time by the revolutionary Alexander Solovyov, on April 2, 1879, that the Tsar took concrete actions to remove power and responsibility from the Third Section, with which he was becoming quickly disillusioned. Alexander effected this removal of power by granting the responsibility for investigation of political crimes, previously the domain of the Third Section, to the Governors-General of Moscow, Kiev, Warsaw, Odessa, Kharkov, and Saint Petersburg. Two more assassination attempts on the Tsar were made after the decentralization of the Third Section. In November 1879, The People's Will, a revolutionary group, attempted to blow up the Tsar's train as he travelled from the Crimea to Moscow; however, one bomb failed to detonate and the second destroyed only a shipment of jam meant for the Tsar. The fifth and final unsuccessful assassination attempt occurred February 5, 1880 when a carpenter, Stephen Khalturin, detonated a bomb which he had secreted under the Tsar's dining room at the Winter Palace; the bomb killed numerous soldiers and failed to kill Alexander only because he was late for dinner that night. Although the Third Section had had reason to suspect that there might be an attempt made on the Tsar's life at the Winter Palace (agents had discovered blueprints of the palace with strange markings during a search of a suspicious person's house in St. Petersburg weeks before the attempt) the Section had been unable to search the palace or to keep it under surveillance in large part because the Tsar's mistress lived there and so the secret police had to pretend to ignore activities at the palace.

In the end, the powerful image of the Section and the Gendarmes was largely undermined when they failed to suppress the rising revolutionary movement and acts of terrorism against government officials. The large network of informers and agents often supplied nothing more than rumors and slanders.

On March 3, 1880, Count Loris-Melikov, the chairman of the Supreme Executive Committee that Alexander created in the wake of the Winter Palace bombing to address the wave of revolutionary terrorism, took control of the Third Section and Gendarmerie from General Drenteln and appointed Major-General Cherevin as acting Head Controller. Soon after this change of command, an investigation of the Third Section uncovered a high level of disorganization within the section. Not only did the Third Section have a long backlog of cases to settle (nearly eleven hundred), but various offices of the Section did not even agree on what suspicious people needed to be surveilled. Rather than sort out the confusion and make the Third Section an effective and efficient secret police once again, Count Loris-Melikov ordered it abolished on August 8, 1880.

== Heads of the Third Section ==
- General of the Cavalry Count Alexander Khristoforovich Benkendorf (1826–1844)
- General of the Cavalry Count Alexey Fyodorovich Orlov (1844–1856)
- General of the Cavalry Prince Vasily Andreyevich Dolgorukov (1856–1866)
- General of the Cavalry Count Pyotr Andreyevich Shuvalov (1866–1874)
- General of the Cavalry Alexander Lvovich Potapov (1874–1876)
- Adjutant general Nikolay Vladimirovich Mezentsev (1876–1878)
- Major general Nikolai Dmitrievich Seliverstov (1878)
- General of the Infantry Alexander Romanovich Drenteln (1878–1880)
- Major general Pyotr Alexandrovich Cherevin (1880)

Managers

- 1826-1831 Fock, Maxim Yakovlevich von
- 1831-1839 Mordvinov, Alexander Nikolaevich
- 1839-1856 Dubelt, Leonty Vasilievich
- 1856-1861 Alexander Yegorovich Timashev
- April — October 1861 Count Shuvalov, Pyotr Andreevich
- 1861-1864 Potapov, Alexander Lvovich
- 1864-1871 Mezentsov, Nikolai Vladimirovich
- 1871-1878 Schulz, Alexander Frantsevich
- 1878-1880 Schmitt, Nikita Konradovich (Kondratievich)

Gendarme Corps Chief of Staff

- 1835-1856 Dubelt, Leonty Vasilievich
- 1856-1861 Timashev, Alexander Egorovich
- April-October 1861 Count Shuvalov, Pyotr Andreevich
- 1861-1864 Potapov, Alexander Lvovich
- 1864-1871 Mezentsov, Nikolai Vladimirovich
- 1871-1874 Levashov, Nikolai Vasilievich
- 1874-1876 Mezentsov, Nikolai Vladimirovich
- 1876-1877 Nikiforaki, Anton Nikolaevich
- 1878 Seliverstov, Nikolai Dmitrievich
- 1878-1880 Cherevin, Peter Alexandrovich

== Departments of the Third Section ==
The Third Section was organized into the following departments (ekspeditsiya); although there was no strict allocation of tasks among different offices.:

- I - supreme police (political crimes and enemies of the regime)
- II - counterfeiting, religious sects, murders, penitentiary, serfdom
- III - aliens
- IV - incidents, staff matters
- V (1842) - censorship of theatre plays (performed by the 1st department since 1828)

== See also ==
- Oprichnik
- Ministry of Police of Imperial Russia
- Okhrana
- Cheka
