= College of Princess Obolenskaya =

School in Saint Petersburg, Russia

The College of Princess AA Obolensky (Гимназия княгини А. А. Оболенской) was a girls' school in St Petersburg in Russia between 1870 and 1918. It was a secondary education school founded by princess Alexandra Alekseevna Obolensky with the purpose of giving girls the level of education necessary to attend university courses. It was as such a pioneer institution in Russia and the second of its kind.
