= Sovremennik (1911–1915) =

Russian monthly magazine

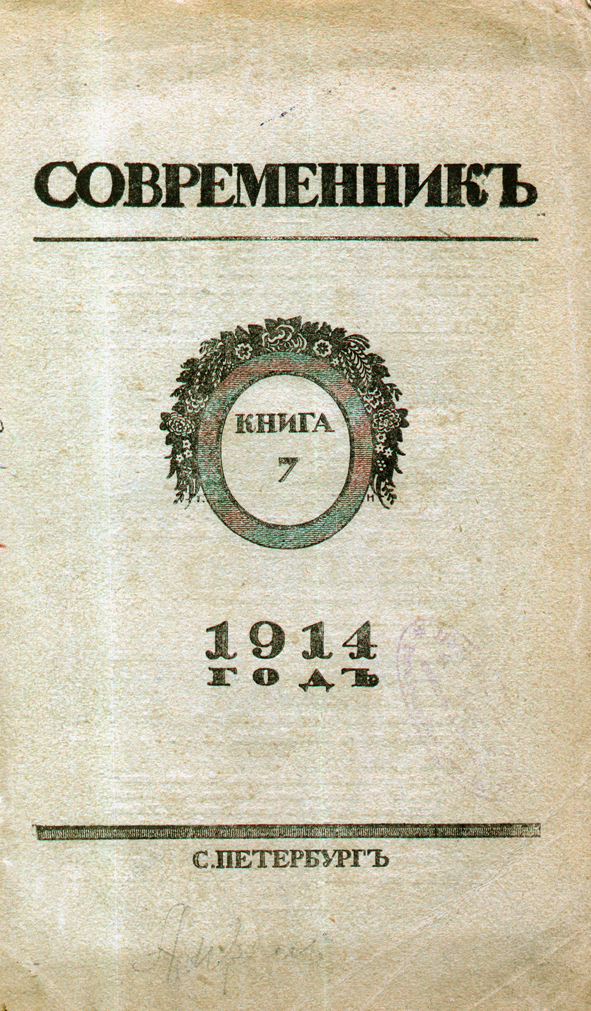
Современник

Sovremennik (Russian: Современник, The Contemporary) was a Russian monthly magazine of "literature, politics, science, history, art and social life". It was published from 1911 to 1915 in Saint Petersburg. Its political philosophy was a cross between Narodism and Marxism. The first editor was Alexander Amfiteatrov with the support of Maxim Gorky who withdrew under the influence of Vladimir Lenin.
