= Aleksandr Potapov (statesman) =

Russian statesman

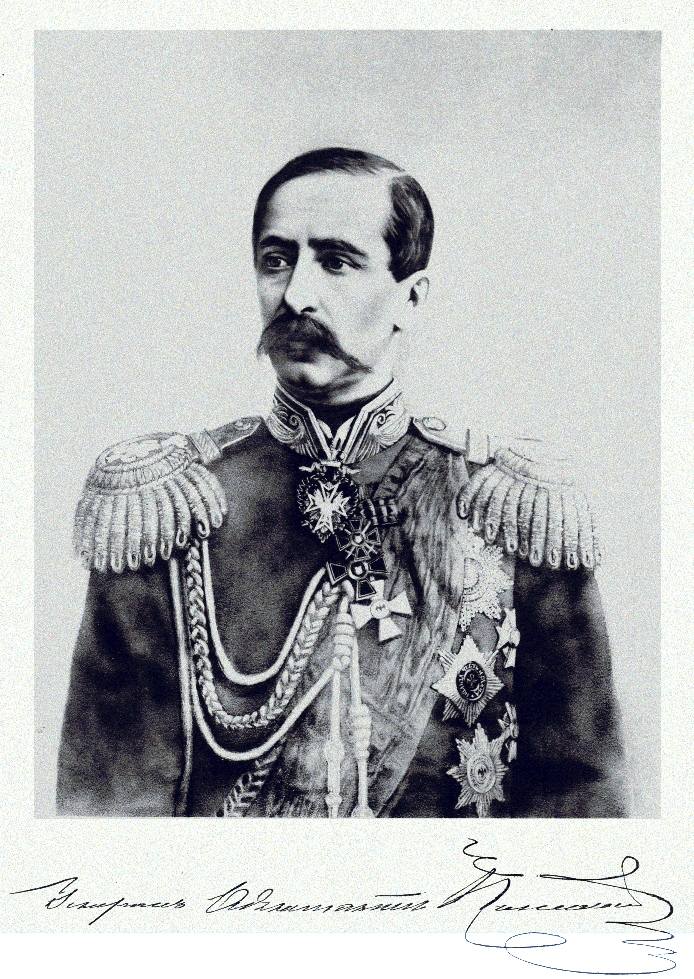
Alexandr Potapov

Alexander Lvovich Potapov (Russian: Алекса́ндр Льво́вич Пота́пов; 16 September 1818, in Voronezh Governorate – 24 October 1886, in Saint Petersburg) was a Russian statesman.

Potapov was Chief of Staff of the Special Corps of Gendarmes from 1861 to 1864, Governor-General of Vilna from 1868 to 1874, and Chief of Gendarmes and Executive Head of the Third Section of H.I.M. Chancellery from 1874 to 1876.

His wife was Princess Ekaterina Vassilievna Obolensky (1820–1871).
