= 1906 Bolshevik raid on the Tsarevich Giorgi =

The 1906 Bolshevik raid on the Tsarevich Giorgi took place on September 20, 1906 (Julian calendar) when Tsarevich Giorgi, 2,200 ton steamship 285 feet long, commanded by captain Sinkevich, was travelling from Odessa to Batum carrying vast amounts of money. The ship stopped off at Novorossiysk, Sukhum and New Athos for wage deliveries. Twenty-five Bolshevik gunmen led by Joseph Stalin slipped aboard armed with Mauser firearms and grenades; at 1:15 am they and four renegade sailors took over the ship.

Stalin said: "We're revolutionaries through and through, not criminals. We need cash for the Revolution and we'll take only Treasury funds. Obey my commands and there'll be no bloodshed. But if you're thinking of resisting, we'll kill you all and blow up the ship."

They stole at least 16,000 roubles. Stalin left each sailor a 10 rouble tip for not resisting. The officers were held hostage in a lifeboat until all the cash was delivered, the sailors then rowed the Bolsheviks ashore. The alarm was not raised for seven hours; none of the raiders were caught.

== See also ==
- Dusheti treasury heist
- 1907 Tiflis bank robbery
