= Jānis Čoke =

Latvian revolutionary

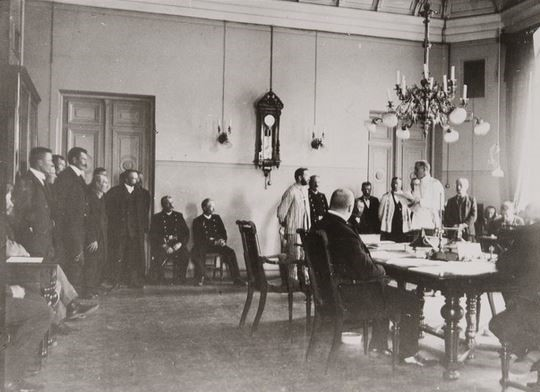
Jānis Čoke (middle) in court

Jānis Čoke (24 September 1878 in Idus parish (now Valmiera Municipality), Kreis Wolmar, Governorate of Livonia – 9 June 1910 in Turku, Grand Duchy of Finland) was a Latvian revolutionary who is known for his involvement in the 1906 robbery of the branch of Russian State Bank in Helsinki.

== Life ==
Čoke was an industrial worker who joined the Latvian Social Democratic Workers' Party in 1902 and became a member on the party's militant wing. During the 1905 Russian Revolution, Čoke founded the revolutionary organization Brašie which was related with several prison riots and attacks against the gendarmerie in Riga.

In February 1906, the Latvian revolutionary Jānis Luters formed a group of 15 revolutionaries. The gang was sent to Finland to rob the Russian State Bank branch in Helsinki. The Latvians were assisted by Finnish activists who opposed the Tsarist regime. With Čoke as the leader, the bank was robbed on 26 February.

After the robbery, Čoke fled to Tampere where he handed the money over to the Russian Bolshevik Nikolay Burenin. He was soon caught in a local hotel, and taken to the police station, where Čoke managed to kill two police officers and one civil person assisting on his arrest.

Čoke was sentenced to life in prison. He died in the Kakola prison in Turku in June 1910. Official cause was pneumonia, but others claimed he died in "suspicious circumstances".
