= Kamo (Bolshevik) =

Armenian Bolshevik revolutionary (1882–1922)

- Կամո
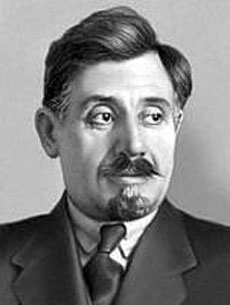
- Simon "Kamo" Ter-Petrosian in 1922
- Born: Simon Arshaki Ter-Petrosian; 27 May 1882; Gori, Georgia Governorate, Russian Empire
- Died: 14 July 1922 (aged 40); Tiflis, Georgian SSR
- Cause of death: Car accident
- Other name: Kamo
- Known for: 1907 Tiflis bank robbery
- Awards: Order Of The Red Banner (Georgian SSR)

Simon Arshaki Ter-Petrosian (Russian: Симон Аршакович Тер-Петросян, romanized: Simon Arshakovich Ter-Petrosyan; Armenian: Սիմոն «Կամո» Տէր Պետրոսեան; 27 May 1882 – 14 July 1922), better known by his nom de guerre of Kamo (Russian: Камо), was an Old Bolshevik revolutionary and an early companion to Soviet leader Joseph Stalin.

From 1903 to 1912, Kamo, a master of disguise, carried out a number of militant operations on behalf of the Bolshevik faction of the Russian Social-Democratic Labour Party, mostly in Georgia, then part of the Russian Empire. He is best known for his central role in the 1907 Tiflis bank robbery, organised by Bolshevik leaders to raise funds for their party activities. For his militant activities he was arrested in Berlin in 1907 but feigned insanity both in German and later Russian prisons, eventually escaping from prison and fleeing the country. He was recaptured in 1912 after another attempted armed robbery and sentenced to death. The death sentence was commuted to life imprisonment as part of the celebrations of the Romanov Tercentenary.

Kamo was released after the February 1917 Russian Revolution. He died in 1922 after being hit by a truck while riding a bicycle in Tiflis. Kamo was buried and had a monument erected in his honor in Pushkin Gardens, near Yerevan Square, but, following the rise to power of Zviad Gamsakhurdia in Georgia in 1991, a threat arose to the safety of the burial of the famous Bolshevik, and relatives transferred Kamo's ashes to the Vakiskoe cemetery, to the grave of his sister Javair.

The name "Kamo" originated from Ter-Petrosian's lack of fluency in the Russian language. One of Stalin's acolytes, Vardoyan, was teaching Kamo Russian grammar, Kamo kept saying kamo instead of komu (кому, "to whom"). Stalin lost his temper, but then laughed: "komu not kamo! Try to remember it bicho [boy]".

== Early life (1882–1902) ==
Simon Ter-Petrosian was born in Gori, Tiflis Governorate, to an Armenian family. His father was a wealthy contractor, who reputedly tyrannised his family. Kamo's mother was 16 when she gave birth to him. He was the oldest of about a dozen children, of whom five survived infancy.

As a child, Kamo liked to get into fights with his peers and would come home beaten. When he was seven, his parents sent him to an Armenian school, although the family spoke Georgian at home, and he struggled with lessons in Armenian. At 11, he was transferred to a municipal school and forced to learn Russian, according to his official biography. According to another source, his parents hired a personal tutor who tried to teach him how to read and write Russian when he was seven.

In 1892, when he was 10 years old, he witnessed a public execution of two people in Gori, ordered to hang by the local Georgian noble. Stepan Shahumyan, who later also became a notable Bolshevik, saw the scene as well.

Kamo's grandfather, a priest, wanted to send him to the Tiflis Theological Seminary, but his mother felt he was too young to go away to school. As a result, Kamo stayed at home and was enrolled in 1895 in a local school, where he remained for three years until being expelled. Ter-Petrosian later recounted his experiences in the local school:

During the three years I spent at school, I not only failed to learn a single thing, but what's more, I forgot what I had learned previously. I forgot entirely how to speak Russian and I was a terrible student. In my spare time, I would go fishing or steal fruit. On a few occasions I was almost caught. But when I reached high school, I grew fond of geography and history. I loved to read about wars and heroes. I was deeply religious and sang in the church choir.

After being expelled, Kamo was sent off to Tiflis to enter the seminary as his grandfather had desired. In Tiflis, Ter-Petrosian met Joseph Stalin (real name, Ioseb Besarionis dze Jughashvili), whose mother, Ketevan, was a friend of Kamo's father. Stalin was a day student at the seminary and helped Ter-Petrosian prepare to enter the seminary. Stalin was expelled from the seminary in 1899; followed by Kamo, who was expelled in 1901. Kamo rejoined Stalin, who tried to teach him Marxism and better Russian but gave up in despair. He had wanted to be an army officer but his father had just gone bankrupt, losing all control over his son.

== Becoming a revolutionary ==
In 1902, Kamo joined a secret Social Democratic organization in Tiflis. He was given the tasks of distributing leaflets, organizing meetings, gathering outlawed publications, and moving illegal printing presses. After the Batumi uprising, Kamo was imprisoned along with Stalin.

In February 1903, the organization asked Kamo along with other revolutionaries to hand out leaflets at a local theatre. Though Kamo's colleagues did not show up to hand out leaflets, Kamo proceeded to the theater by himself and hurled 500 leaflets out of the balcony of the darkened theater before the curtain went up. He then left the theatre before the police arrived. Kamo then watched from across the street as the police proceeded to search everyone exiting the theatre and arrest suspects. Because of his daring during this episode, the revolutionary organization entrusted Kamo with more dangerous tasks.

In December 1903, a gendarme stopped Kamo, searched his bag, and found outlawed revolutionary literature. Kamo was arrested and imprisoned. For his first four months in prison, he was put in solitary confinement and then moved to the general prison population. After being moved, Kamo caught malaria and as part of his therapy, was allowed to walk in the prison yard during the morning. One day while walking through the prison yard, he noticed that his guard was not looking and scaled the nearby prison wall. After escaping from the prison, Kamo quickly hailed a passing carriage and was able to meet up with fellow revolutionaries. Kamo described this experience later:

I shall never forget the sensation of freedom which I experienced after scaling that wall. The sun shone, the waves sparkled, I had freedom at last. I wanted to run. Never did I experience such joy.

During the Revolution of 1905, Kamo made contact with Vladimir Lenin and other leading Bolsheviks. Lenin's widow Nadezhda Krupskaya wrote, years later that:

This fighting man, with his colossal courage, his unwavering strength of will and his fearlessness, seemed at the same time an extraordinarily unsophisticated fellow, a rather naive and gentle comrade. He was passionately attached to Ilyich (Lenin), Krasin and Bogdanov ... He made good friends with my mother, and told her all about his aunts and sisters. Kamo often travelled between Finland and Petersburg, and always went fully armed. Mother used to tie his revolvers on his back each time with particular care.

Kamo never wrote anything. Instead he trained new revolutionaries. He claimed the best places to hide from the Okhrana were brothels. He had affairs with his landlady, a Jewish nurse and other women just to get money to survive. He became friends with the Georgian Bolshevik Ordzhonikidze, begging him to "become my assistant." In late 1905 he fatally shot an Armenian three times for stealing money he was meant to guard.

After the 1905 Revolution, the Russian government demanded that all radical groups disarm. The Russian Social Democratic Labour Party ("RSDLP") were split between more moderate Mensheviks who favored disarming, and the hard line Bolsheviks, who kept their weapons. State security forces then moved to confiscate Bolshevik arms and suppress the group. Kamo led the defense of the Bolshevik stronghold in Tiflis against the police and army, commanded by General Fyodor Gryazonov. On 31 January [O.S. 18 January] 1906, state forces crushed the rebels in the Tiflis workers' district. Kamo was almost killed in the firefight, and was captured. He was tortured by the Cossacks who nearly cut off his nose, but he said nothing. Stalin said: "He could bear any pain, an astonishing person." Kamo soon escaped from prison a second time by "exchanging identity papers with an ignorant peasant." After his escape, Kamo went to the bomb factory of Leonid Krasin, a fellow Bolshevik revolutionary. On 28 July [O.S. 15 July] 1906, he was present at Stalin's wedding reception to Ketevan Svanidze.

=== Expropriations ===
To fund revolutionary activities, Bolshevik leader Vladimir Lenin endorsed the use of "expropriations", a euphemism for armed robbery of state banks. Lenin instructed Stalin to create a group of expropriators that would not be directly affiliated with the Bolsheviks. He told Stalin "put at the head of the group an individual who would die rather than reveal the plan should he be arrested." Stalin appointed Kamo.

Kamo's group consisted of approximately 10 people. For his band of "expropriators", Kamo recruited young Georgian women who used their looks to gain information about transfer of State Bank funds.

In the fall of 1906, Maxim Litvinov was sent to the Caucasus by Krasin to work with Kamo to gain more funds for the revolutionary cause. Litvinov and Kamo worked to obtain ammunition in Varna, Bulgaria that was to be smuggled into the Caucasus. The ammunition was loaded onto a small yacht called Zara. Kamo was to sail the boat back to Russia with five other sailors. Kamo acted as the ship's cook. Kamo rigged a bomb to destroy the Zara, with the detonator in his cabin, to ensure the Zara would never be captured by Russian police.

Zara ran into a storm as she was leaving Varna. Water leaked into the hull and flooded the engines. With Zara disabled, Kamo tried to detonate the bomb, but it did not explode. Instead, the Zara was stranded, without means of calling for help. After twenty hours, with the crew half-frozen and half-dead, they were found by a fishing boat. Soon after they got off, the Zara capsized. The crew all made it back to Russia separately, though most of them were arrested (but not Kamo).

== 1907 Tiflis bank robbery ==
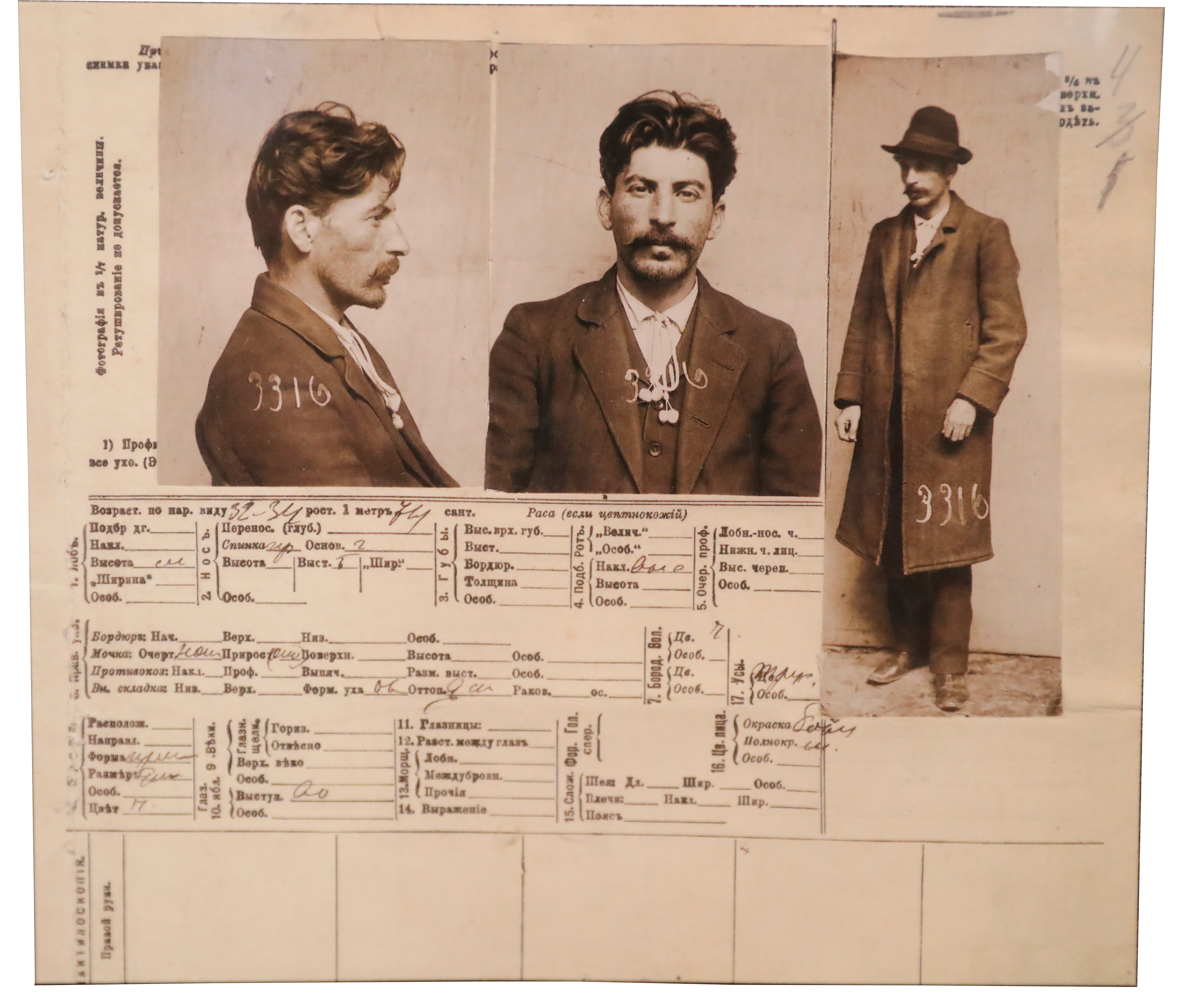
The information card on "I. V. Stalin", from the files of the Tsarist secret police in Saint Petersburg, 1911

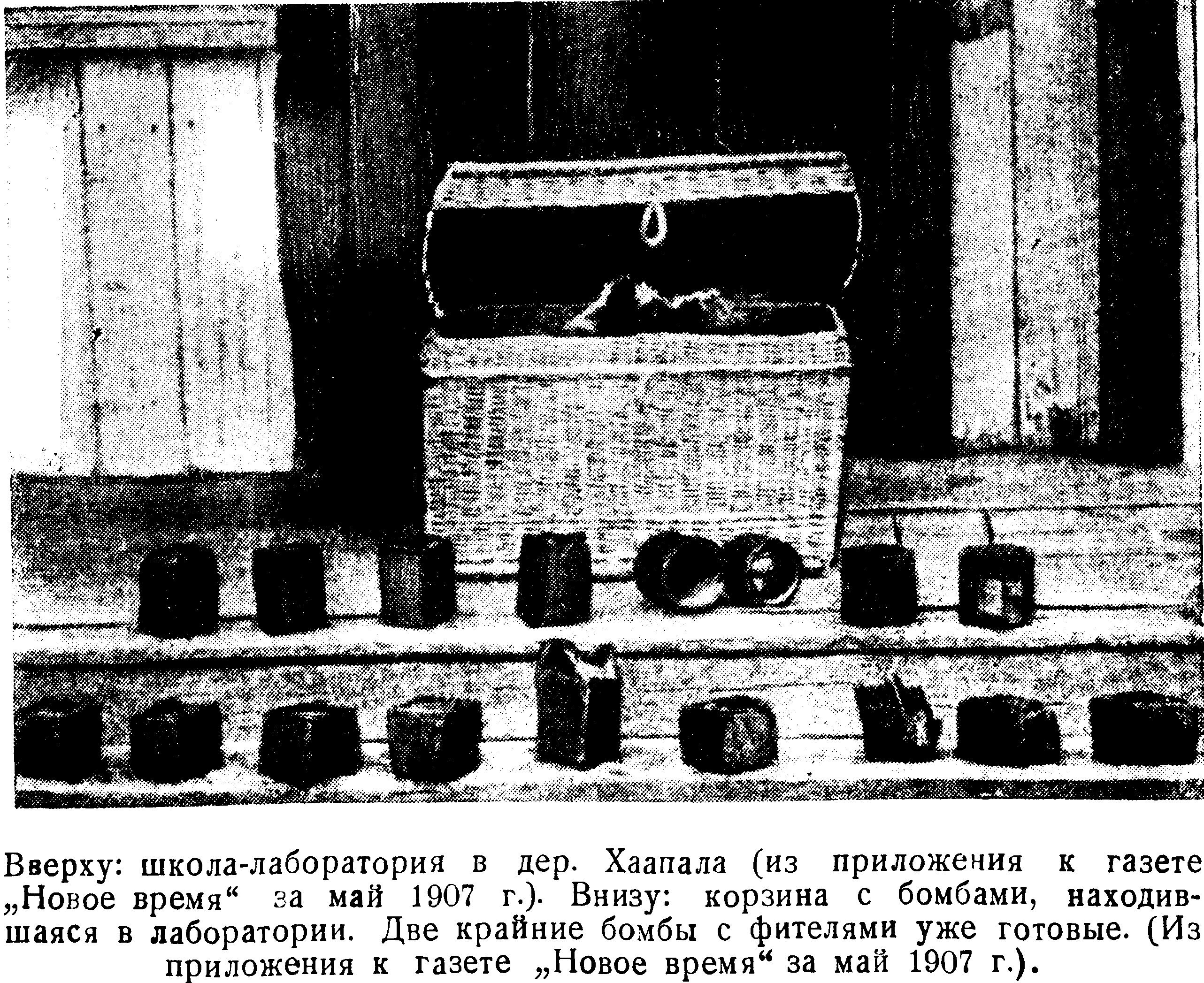
Bombs found in 1907 in a Bolshevik explosives lab in Finland

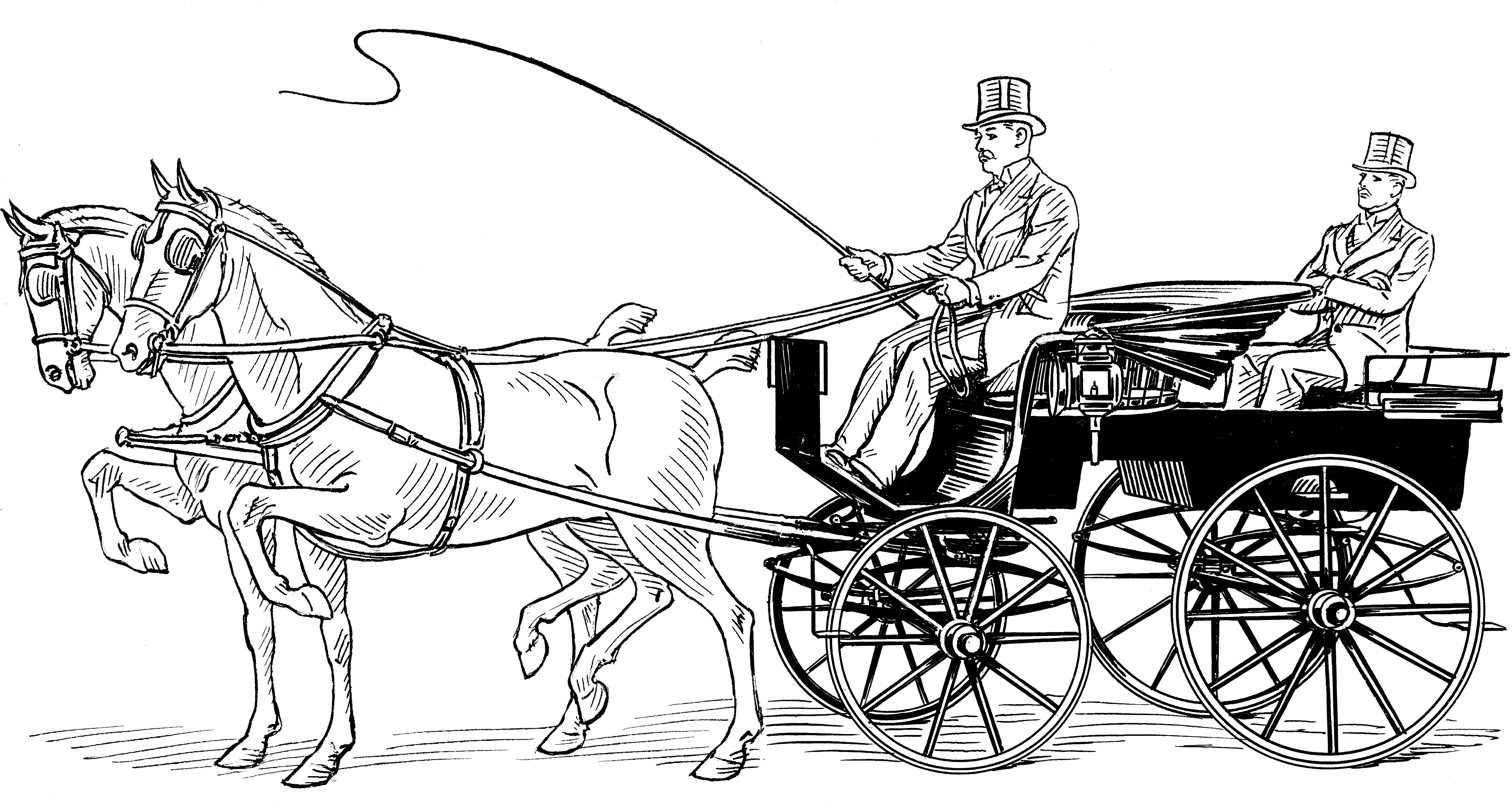
Picture of a typical phaeton, used in the robbery

In April 1907, high ranking Bolsheviks decided that Stalin and Kamo should organize a robbery in Tiflis to obtain funds to purchase arms. Through his connections, Stalin managed to discover from an old friend that there was going to be a large shipment of money by horse-drawn carriage to the Tiflis Bank on 26 June 1907.

In preparation for the robbery, Kamo's gang smuggled bombs into Tiflis by hiding them inside a sofa. Only weeks before the robbery, Kamo accidentally set off one of Krasin's bombs while trying to set the fuse. The blast from the bomb severely injured Kamo's eye, leaving a permanent scar. Kamo was confined to his bed for a month due to intense pain, and had not fully recovered by the time of the robbery.

On the day of the robbery, the robbers all took their places in Yerevan Square dressed as peasants and waited on street corners with revolvers and grenades. In contrast to the other robbers, Kamo was disguised as a cavalry captain and came to the square in a horse–drawn phaeton, a type of open carriage.

The bank's stagecoach made its way through the crowded square at about 10:30 am. When the stagecoach was close enough, one of the robbers gave a signal to attack. Once the signal was given, robbers pulled the fuses on their grenades and threw them at the carriage. The resulting explosions killed horses and guards. The robbers then began shooting at the various security men guarding the stagecoach, as well as those securing the square.

Though the explosions had killed many of the guards and horses, one of the horses harnessed to the stagecoach was injured but still alive. The bleeding animal bolted from the scene pulling the stagecoach with it. Two of the robbers and Kamo chased after the runaway money-laden stagecoach. One of the robbers threw another grenade at the escaping stagecoach, killing the horse and stopping the stagecoach. After the stagecoach was stopped, Kamo raced to the stopped carriage in his phaeton, firing his pistol as he drove. Once he got to the stagecoach, other robbers who had reached the coach helped throw the money into Kamo's carriage.

After securing the money, Kamo quickly rode out of the square and encountered a police carriage ridden by the deputy police chief. Instead of turning away, Kamo pretended to be part of the security forces and shouted to the deputy that "the money's safe. Run to the square." The deputy obeyed the apparent captain of cavalry, and it was only much later that he realized that he had been fooled by an escaping robber.

Kamo then rode to the gang's headquarters where he changed out of his uniform. All of the robbers quickly scattered, and none were caught in the act by the authorities.

Fifty people lay wounded in the square along with the dead humans and horses. The authorities stated that only three people had died, but documents in the Okhrana archives reveal that the true number was around forty.

The State Bank was not sure how much it actually lost from the robbery, but the best estimates were that around 341,000 rubles were stolen, worth approximately $3.4 million in 2008 United States dollars. Of the 341,000 in rubles taken, about 91,000 were in small untraceable bills, but around 250,000 rubles were in large 500-ruble notes with serial numbers known to the police. This made them very difficult to exchange undetected.

A large portion of the stolen money was eventually moved by Kamo, who took the money to Lenin in Finland, which was then part of the Russian Empire. Kamo then spent the remaining summer months staying with Lenin at his dacha. That fall, Kamo left Finland to buy arms for future activities; he traveled to Paris, then to Belgium to buy arms and ammunition, then to Bulgaria to buy 200 detonators.

== Captures and trials ==
"[R]esigned to death, absolutely calm. On my grave there should already be grass growing six feet high. One can't escape death forever. One must die some day. But I will try my luck again. Try any way of escape. Perhaps we shall once more have the laugh over our enemies...I am in irons. Do what you like. I am ready for anything."
— Note from Kamo to fellow prisoner in 1912 while awaiting the death penalty.

After his purchase in Bulgaria, Kamo traveled to Berlin and delivered a letter from Lenin to a prominent Bolshevik, Dr. Yakov Zhitomirsky, asking the doctor for medical assistance to treat Kamo's still injured eye. Lenin had been hoping to help the man who had successfully executed the robbery, but unintentionally turned Kamo over to a double agent. Zhitomirsky had been secretly working as an agent of the Russian government and quickly informed the Okhrana about his encounter with Kamo. The Okhrana then asked the Berlin police to arrest Kamo. When they did so, they found a forged Austrian passport and a suitcase with 200 detonators, which he was planning to use in another large bank robbery.

After being arrested in Berlin, Kamo received a note from Krasin through his lawyer Oskar Cohn telling Kamo to feign insanity so that he would be declared unfit to stand trial. To demonstrate his insanity, Kamo refused food, tore his clothes, tore out his hair, attempted suicide by hanging himself, slashed his wrists, and ate his own excrement. In order to make sure that Kamo was not faking his condition, German doctors stuck pins under his nails, struck him in the back with a long needle, and burned him with hot irons, but he did not break his act. After all of these tests, the chief doctor of the Berlin asylum wrote in June 1909 that "there is no foundation to the belief that [Kamo] is feigning insanity. He is without doubt mentally ill, is incapable of appearing before a court, or of serving sentence. It is extremely doubtful that he can completely recover."

In 1909, Kamo was extradited to a Russian prison where he continued to feign insanity. In April 1910, Kamo was tried for his role in the Tiflis robbery. At trial, Kamo continued to act insane by ignoring the proceedings and instead openly feeding a pet bird that he had snuck into the proceedings in his shirt. The trial was suspended while officials examined Kamo's sanity. The court eventually found that he was sane when he committed the Tiflis robbery, but was presently mentally ill and should be confined until he recovered.

In August 1911, after feigning insanity for more than three years, Kamo escaped from the psychiatric ward of the Tiflis prison by sawing through his window bars and climbing down a homemade rope.

Kamo later discussed his experiences at feigning insanity for over three years:

"What can I tell you? They threw me about, hit me over the legs and the like. One of the men forced me to look into the mirror. There I saw – not the reflection of myself, but rather of some thin, ape-like man, gruesome and horrible looking, grinding his teeth. I thought to myself, 'Maybe I've really gone mad!' It was a terrible moment, but I regained my bearings and spat upon the mirror. You know I think they liked that....I thought a great deal: 'Will I survive or will I really go mad?' That was not good. I did not have faith in myself, see? ... [The authorities], of course, know their business, their science. But they do not know the Caucasians. Maybe every Caucasian is insane, as far as they are concerned. Well, who will drive whom mad? Nothing developed. They stuck to their guns and I to mine. In Tiflis, they didn't torture me. Apparently they thought that the Germans can make no mistakes."

After escaping, Kamo met up with Lenin in Paris. Kamo was distressed to hear that a "rupture had occurred" between Lenin, Bogdanov, and Krasin. Kamo told Lenin about his arrest and how he had simulated insanity while in prison. After leaving Paris, Kamo eventually met up with Krasin and planned another armed robbery. Kamo was caught before the robbery took place and was put on trial in Tiflis for his exploits including the Tiflis bank robbery. This time while imprisoned, Kamo did not feign insanity and was given four death sentences.

Seemingly doomed to death, Kamo then had the good luck along with other prisoners to have his sentence commuted to a long prison term as part of the celebrations of the Romanov dynasty tricentennial. Kamo was released from prison after the February Revolution in 1917.

== Later life and death ==
Kamo, after his release from prison and the seizing of power by the Bolsheviks, seemed bored with the new life outside of prison. Stalin introduced him to Lenin as: "The old bank robber-terrorist of the Caucasus." He paced the halls of the Kremlin until he was allowed to create his own band of men who would help raid money on the other side of the Eastern Front to support the country.

Having been given permission to create his own gang, Kamo would test all of his new members to make sure that they were up to the task. Kamo would test his new recruits by taking the new recruits to a forest clearing and have them be attacked by fake White army members, bound to a tree, and then put through a fake execution to test their courage. Kamo said that with this test "you could be absolutely sure [your comrades] wouldn't let you down."

After the wars were over, Kamo worked in the Soviet Customs office. He died in a 1922 road accident when a truck hit him while he was cycling.

Kamo was buried with honors and a wreath was placed on his bier with an inscription stating "To the unforgettable Kamo, from Lenin and Krupskaya." Ironically, Kamo, the man who had been found guilty and sentenced to death for the robbery that took place in Yerevan Square, was buried and had a monument erected in his honor (replacing Pushkin's statue) in Pushkin Gardens, near Yerevan Square. Kamo's monument was later removed and Kamo has been buried elsewhere.

== Bibliography ==
- Sebag-Montefiore, Simon (2007). Young Stalin (ePub ed.). Weidenfeld & Nicolson. ISBN 978-0297850687.
- Brackman, Roman (29 September 2000). "Chapter 7 – The Great Tiflis Bank Robbery". The secret file of Joseph Stalin: a hidden life. Psychology Press. pp. 58–66. ISBN 0-7146-5050-1.
- Kun, Miklós (2003). "Chapter 5 – Why Stalin was called a 'Mail-Coach Robber'". Stalin: an unknown portrait. Central European University Press. pp. 74–80. ISBN 963-9241-19-9.
- Shub, David (July 1960). "Kamo-the Legendary Old Bolshevik of the Caucasus". Russian Review. 19 (3): 227–247. doi:10.2307/126539. JSTOR 126539.
- Sebag Montefiore, Simon (2008). "Prologue: The Bank Robbery". Young Stalin. Random House, Inc. pp. 3–18. ISBN 978-1-4000-9613-8.
- Souvarine, Boris (2005). "Chapter IV – A Professional Revoluationary". Stalin: A Critical Survey of Bolshevism. Kessinger Publishing. pp. 92–106. ISBN 1-4191-1307-0.
- Ulam, Adam (1998). "The Years of Waiting: 1908–1917". The Bolsheviks: the intellectual and political history of the triumph of communism in Russia. Harvard University Press. pp. 279–280. ISBN 0-674-07830-6.
