= Freedom Square, Tbilisi =

Freedom Square – Liberty Square
- თავისუფლების მოედანი (Georgian)
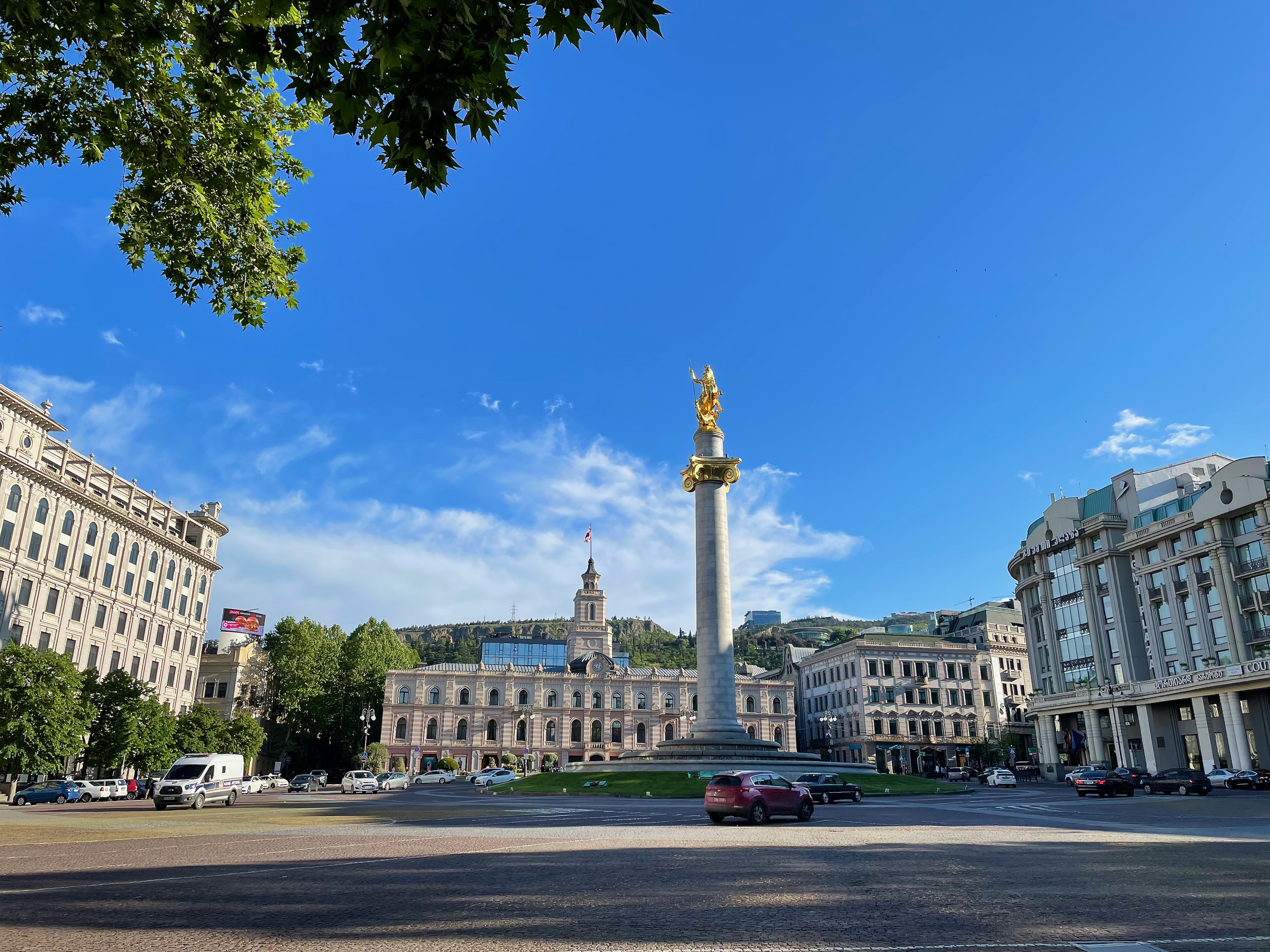

- Location within Tbilisi
- 41°41′36″N 44°48′06″E
- Location: Tbilisi, Georgia

History
- Built: Early 19th century

Site notes
- Architectural styles: Neoclassical and Modern with some Pseudo-moorish elements.

Freedom Square or Liberty Square is located in the center of Tbilisi, Georgia, at the eastern end of Rustaveli Avenue (in Georgian, it is თავისუფლების მოედანი Tavisuplebis moedani, pronounced [tʰavisupʰlebis moedani]).

Under Imperial Russia it was known as Erivansky or Paskevich-Erivansky Square (Georgian: ერევანსკის მოედანი, Erevansk'is moedani, Russian: Эриванская площадь, Erivanskaya ploshchad.) While part of the Soviet Union, it was Beria Square (Georgian: ბერიას მოედანი, Berias moedani) and Lenin Square (Georgian: ლენინის მოედანი, Leninis moedani).

== History ==
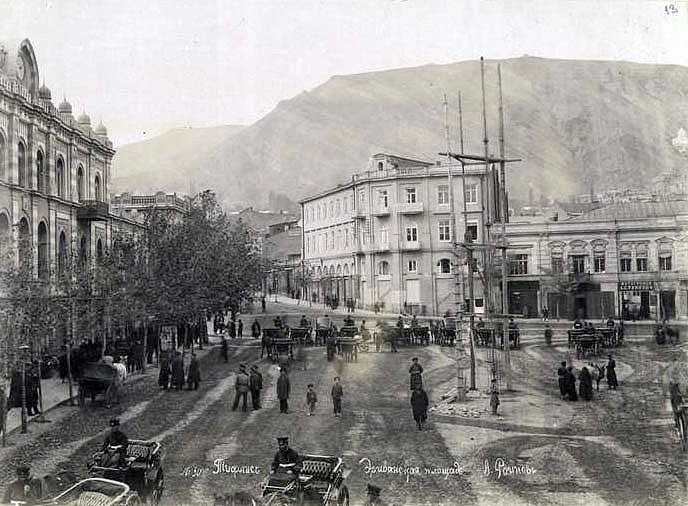
Paskevich-Erivansky Square in the 1870s

The square was originally named after Ivan Paskevich, Count of Erivan, a general in the Russian Imperial Army of Ukrainian descent, who earned his title in honor of his conquest of Erivan (present-day Yerevan) for the Russian Empire. During the Soviet era, the square was renamed twice: first to "Beria Square", and then "Lenin Square". The location was first named Freedom Square in 1918, during the foundation of the First Georgian Republic following the collapse of the Russian Empire.

Freedom Square was the site of the 1907 Tiflis bank robbery. It has also been the site of various mass demonstrations including those for Georgia's independence (from the Soviet Union), the Rose Revolution, and others. In 2005, U.S. President George W. Bush and Georgian President Mikheil Saakashvili addressed a crowd of an estimated 100,000 people to mark the 60th anniversary of the end of World War II. During this event, Georgian-Armenian Vladimir Arutyunian threw a live grenade at the two presidents in an unsuccessful assassination attempt.

== Monuments ==
Abutting the north side of Freedom Square is a small open space with a fountain and a bust of Alexander Pushkin. Nearby the famous communist Kamo (Simon Ter-Petrossian) was once buried, but during Stalin's rule his remains were moved to an undisclosed location.

Tbilisi City Assembly is situated on the square. Other buildings include the former Bank of Georgia head office and the Courtyard by Marriott Tbilisi. The square will also accommodate the Old Tbilisi local government office, the building works of which are already started.

During the Soviet period, the square featured a large statue of Vladimir Lenin, which was built in 1956 and symbolically torn down in August 1991. On November 23, 2006, the Liberty Monument depicting St George slaying the dragon, created by Zurab Tsereteli was unveiled in the same place.

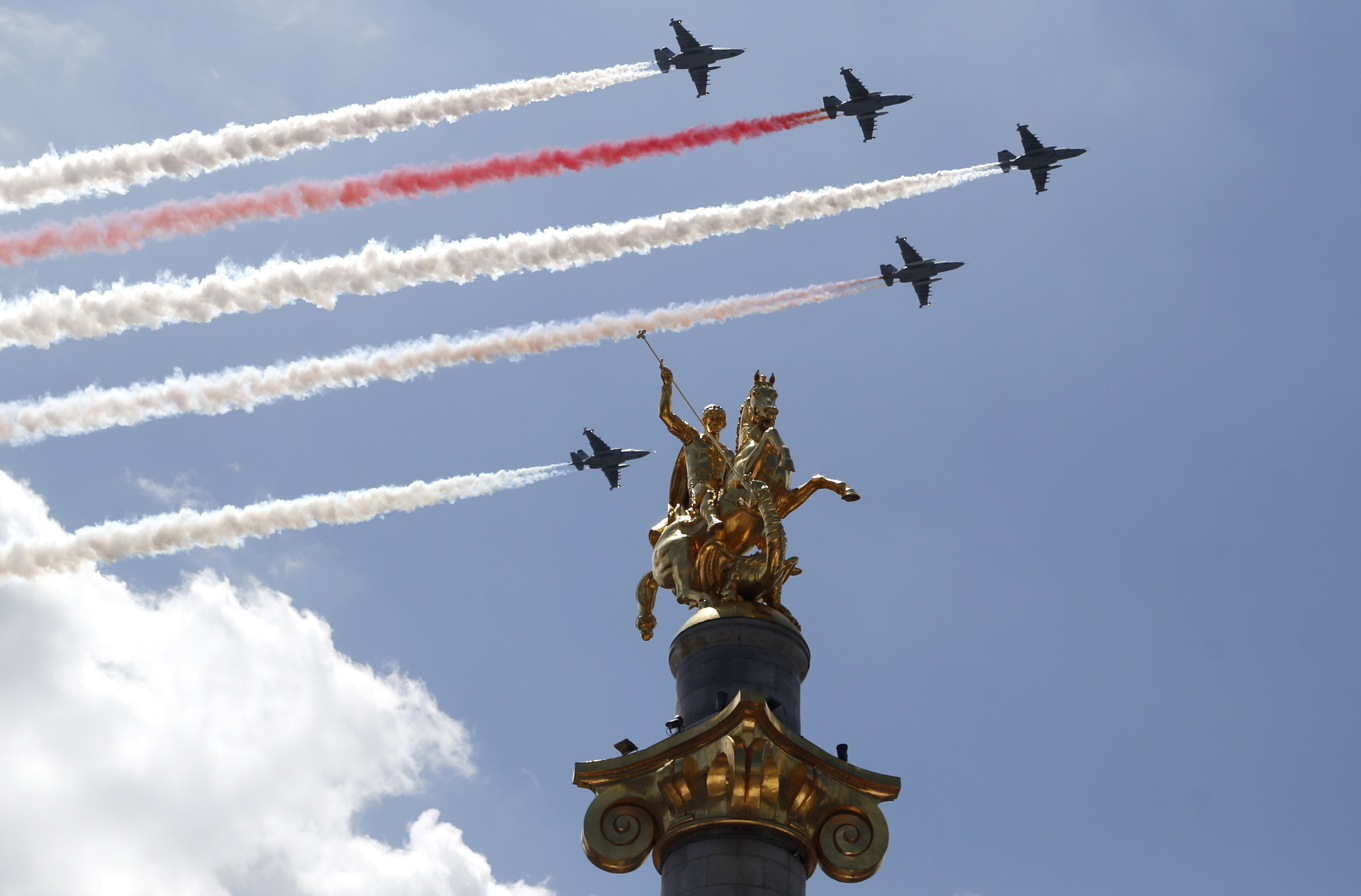
Georgian Independence Day celebrations on Freedom Square

Branching out from this square are six streets: Rustaveli Avenue, Pushkin Street, Kote Apkhazi Street, Shalva Dadiani Street, Galaktion Tabidze Street and Giorgi Leonidze Street.

== Gallery ==
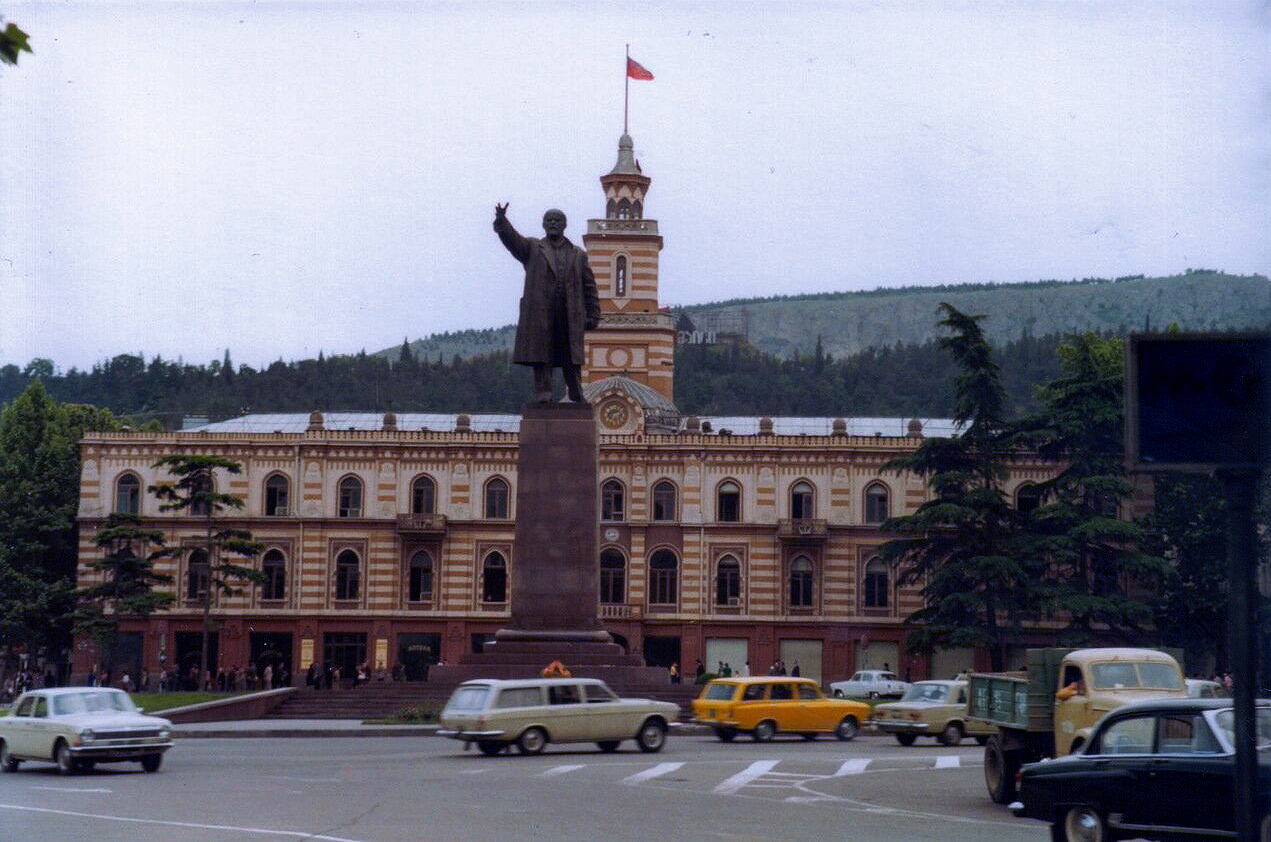
Lenin Square in 1976

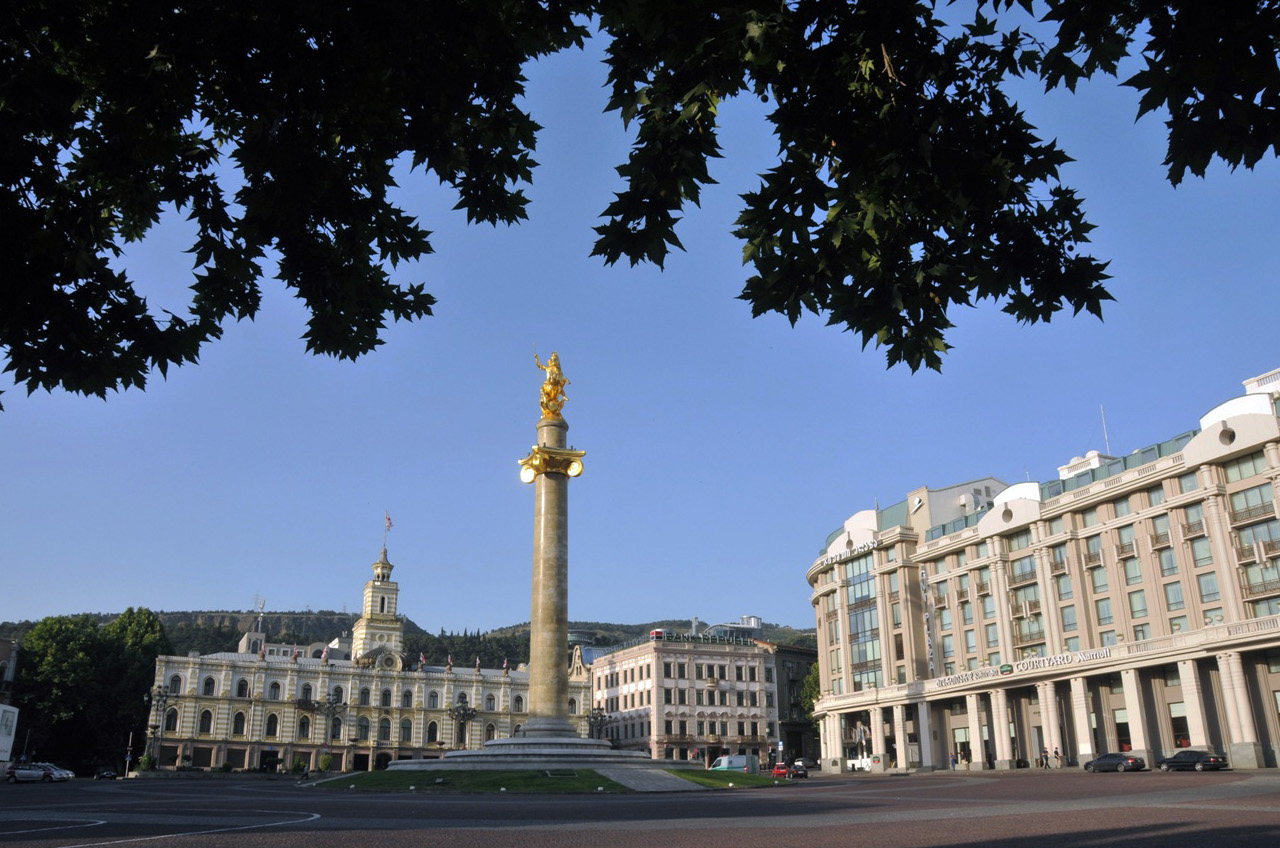
Freedom Square in 2000s

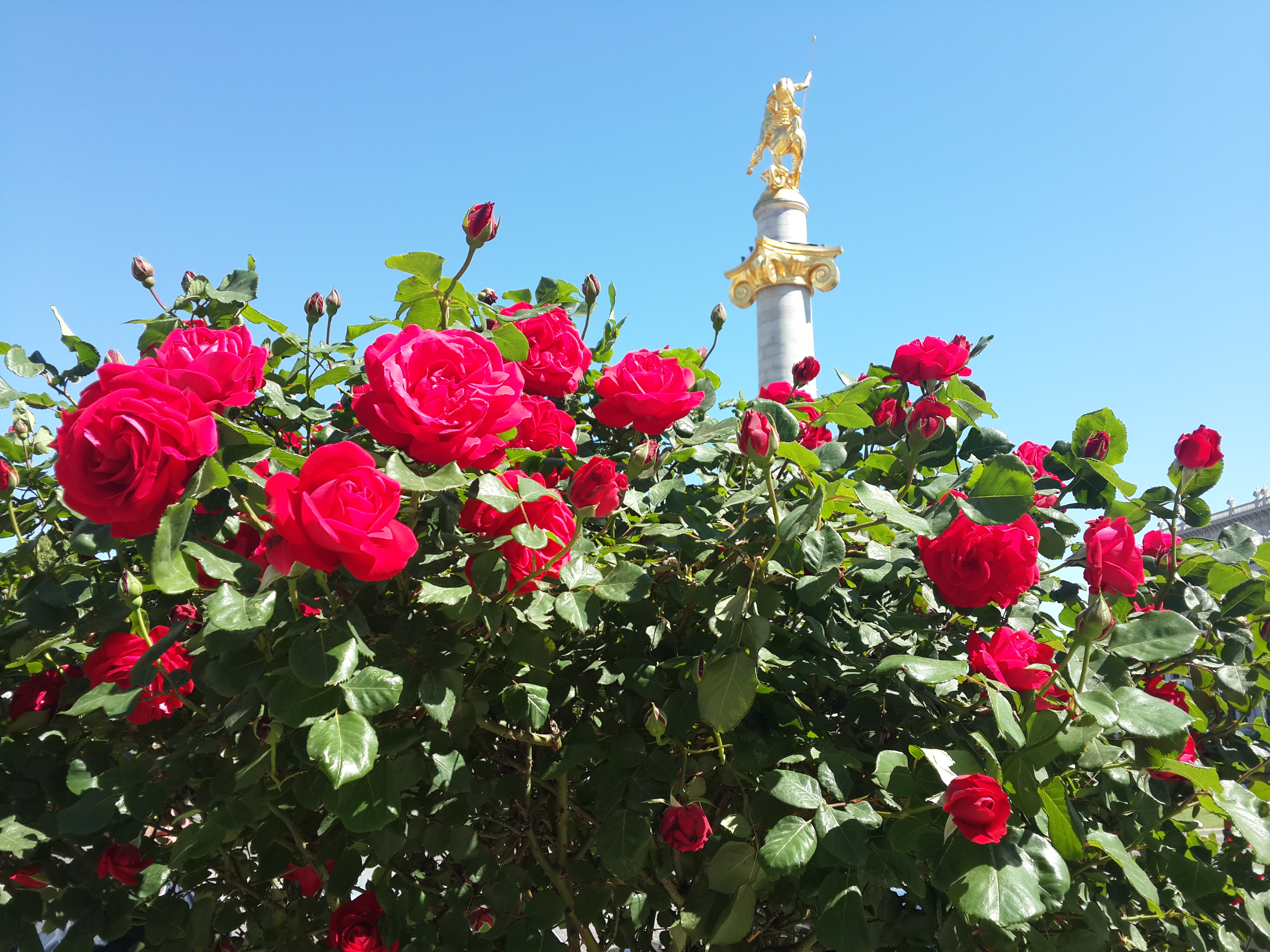
Roses at Liberty Square, Tbilisi

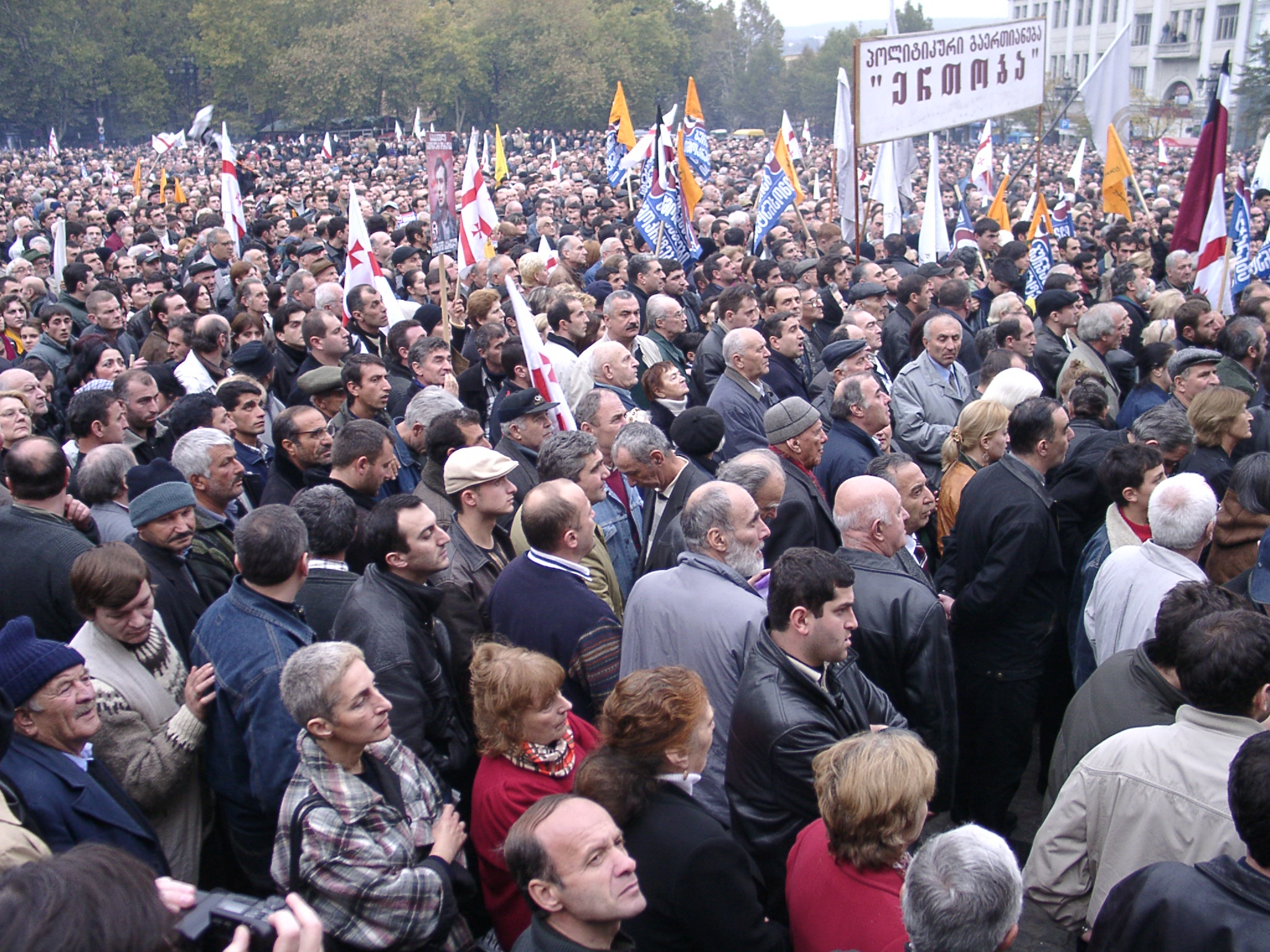
Demonstration for Rose Revolution in Freedom Square
