= 1906 Helsinki bank robbery =

Politically motivated bank robbery in Grand Duchy of Finland

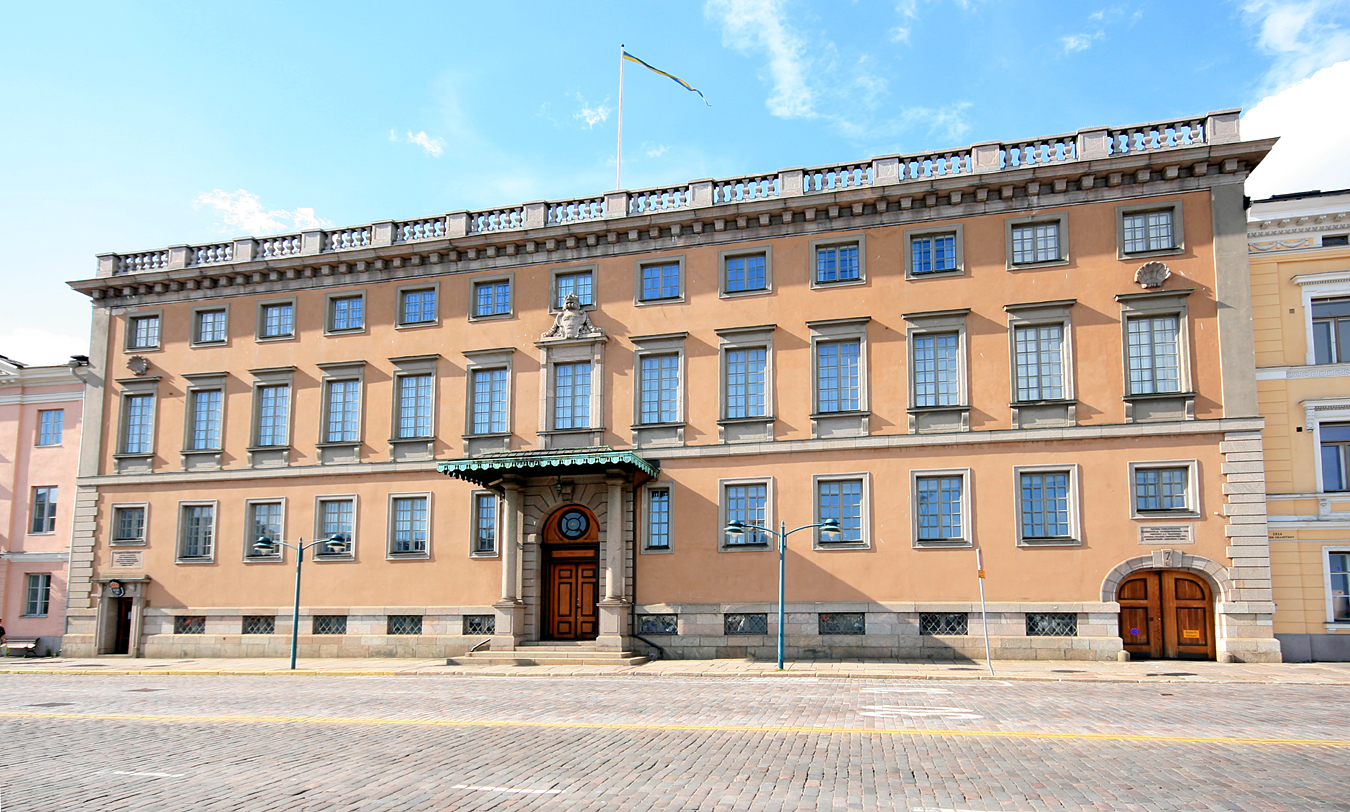
Former building of the State Bank of the Russian Empire in Helsinki. Now Embassy of Sweden.

1906 Helsinki bank robbery was an armed robbery on 26 February 1906 in Helsinki, Grand Duchy of Finland. A branch of Russian State Bank was robbed by members of the Latvian Social Democratic Workers' Party to fund Bolshevik revolutionary activities in Russia.

The robbery was organized by Russian revolutionary Nikolay Burenin and executed by a gang of 15 Latvian revolutionaries who killed a guard and escaped with 170,743 rubles (equivalent to around US$1.7 million in 2013). A notable participant in the robbery was Jānis Žāklis, who is widely suspected of being the alleged mastermind of the robberies that led to the Siege of Sidney Street known as Peter the Painter. Burenin was a concert pianist who was playing in Tampere on the same evening. On their way to meet him, three gang members were captured in the village of Kerava after one Russian gendarme was shot dead. The gang leader Jānis Čoke and three other robbers were able to reach Tampere where they handed the money over to Burenin. He later fled with it to the United States on Maxim Gorki's fund raising trip as his personal secretary.

Jānis Čoke was captured three days later in Tampere. He managed to kill three people including one policeman before he was arrested. Čoke was sentenced to three life sentences plus 19 years. He died of pneumonia in June 1910.

== See also ==
- Dusheti treasury heist
- 1907 Tiflis bank robbery
