= Jacob Zhitomirsky =

Russian doctor and secret agent

Jacob (Yakov) Zhitomirsky (Russian: Яков Абрамович Житомирский; party alias Otsov (Отцов); Okhrana aliases Andre and Daudet) was a prominent Bolshevik best known for being a secret agent of the Okhrana.

== Biography ==
He was recruited by Okhrana in 1902, while studying at the University of Berlin. Zhitomirsky was active in Berlin RSPLP group, reporting its activities to the Russian police, until 1907 when Bolsheviks were expelled from Berlin by German authorities and Zhitomirsky moved to Paris.

He attended 5th RSDLP Congress in London.

In 1908, he was given twenty 500-ruble notes by the people involved in the 1907 Tiflis bank robbery. Unable to exchange notes, he passed this money to the vice-director of the Russian Department of Police Vissarionov, during his visit to Paris.

During World War I he served as a doctor with the Russian Expeditionary Force in France and reported about revolutionary propaganda among the Russian troops.
