= Freedom Monument (Tbilisi) =

Monument in Tbilisi, Georgia

- თავისუფლების მონუმენტი
- Interactive map of Freedom Monument
- Location: Freedom Square, Tbilisi, Tbilisi, Georgia
- Coordinates: 41°41′36.24″N 44°48′05.26″E
- Designer: Zurab Tsereteli
- Material: Granite, Bronze, Gold
- Height: 35 metres (115 ft)
- Completion date: 2006
- Dedicated to: Freedom and independence of the Georgian nation

The Freedom Monument (Georgian: თავისუფლების მონუმენტი; tavisuplebis monument'i), commonly known as the St. George Statue, is a memorial located in Tbilisi, Georgia, dedicated to the freedom and independence of the Georgian nation. Unveiled in 2006 in Tbilisi's central square, the monument of granite and gold is 35 metres (115 ft) high and is easily spotted from any point of the city. The actual statue — 5.6 metres (18 ft) tall, made of bronze and covered with gold — is a gift to the city from its creator, Georgian sculptor Zurab Tsereteli.

== Gallery ==
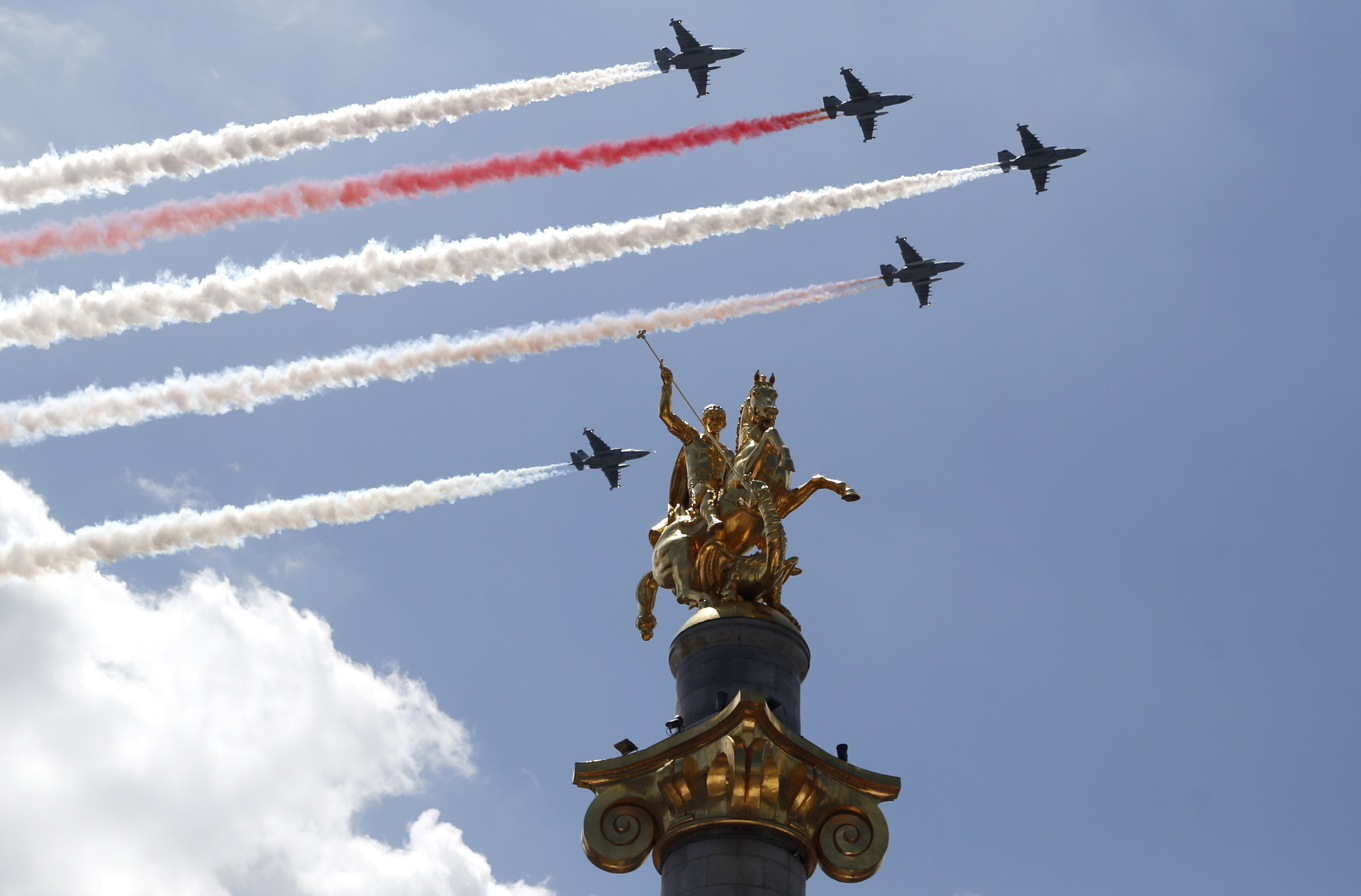

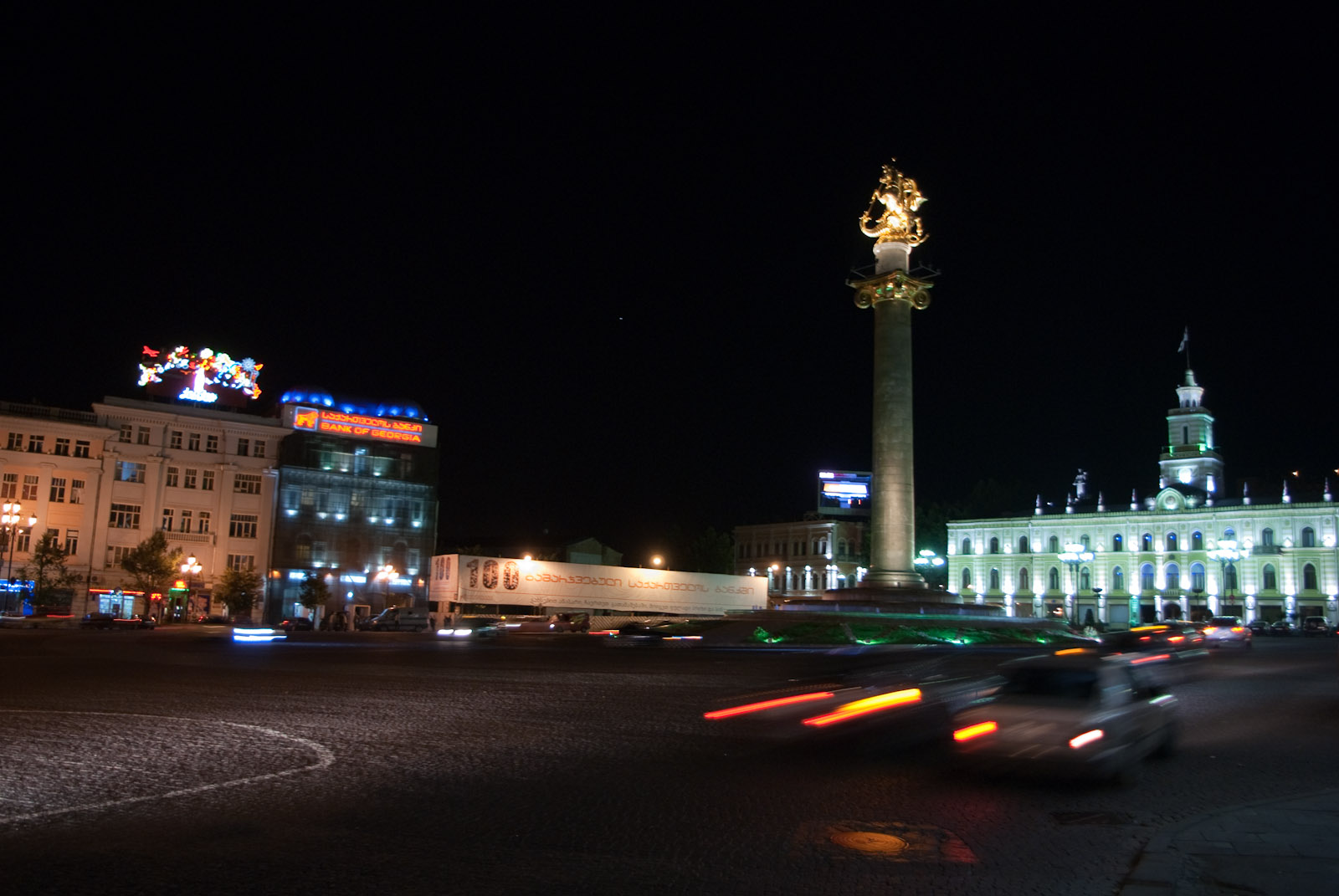

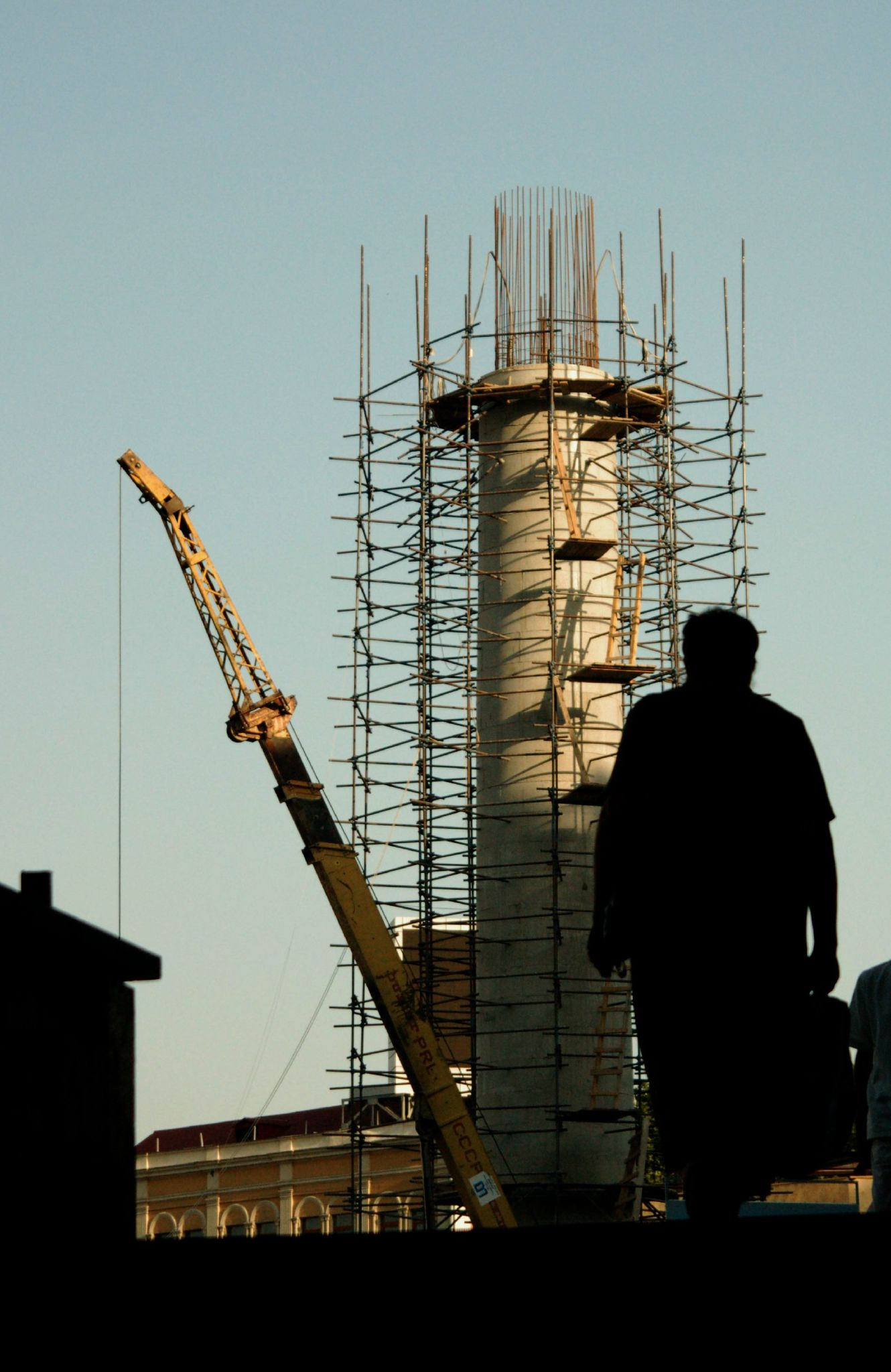

== See also ==
- Freedom Square, Tbilisi
