= Dusheti treasury heist =

1906 robbery in Dusheti, Georgia

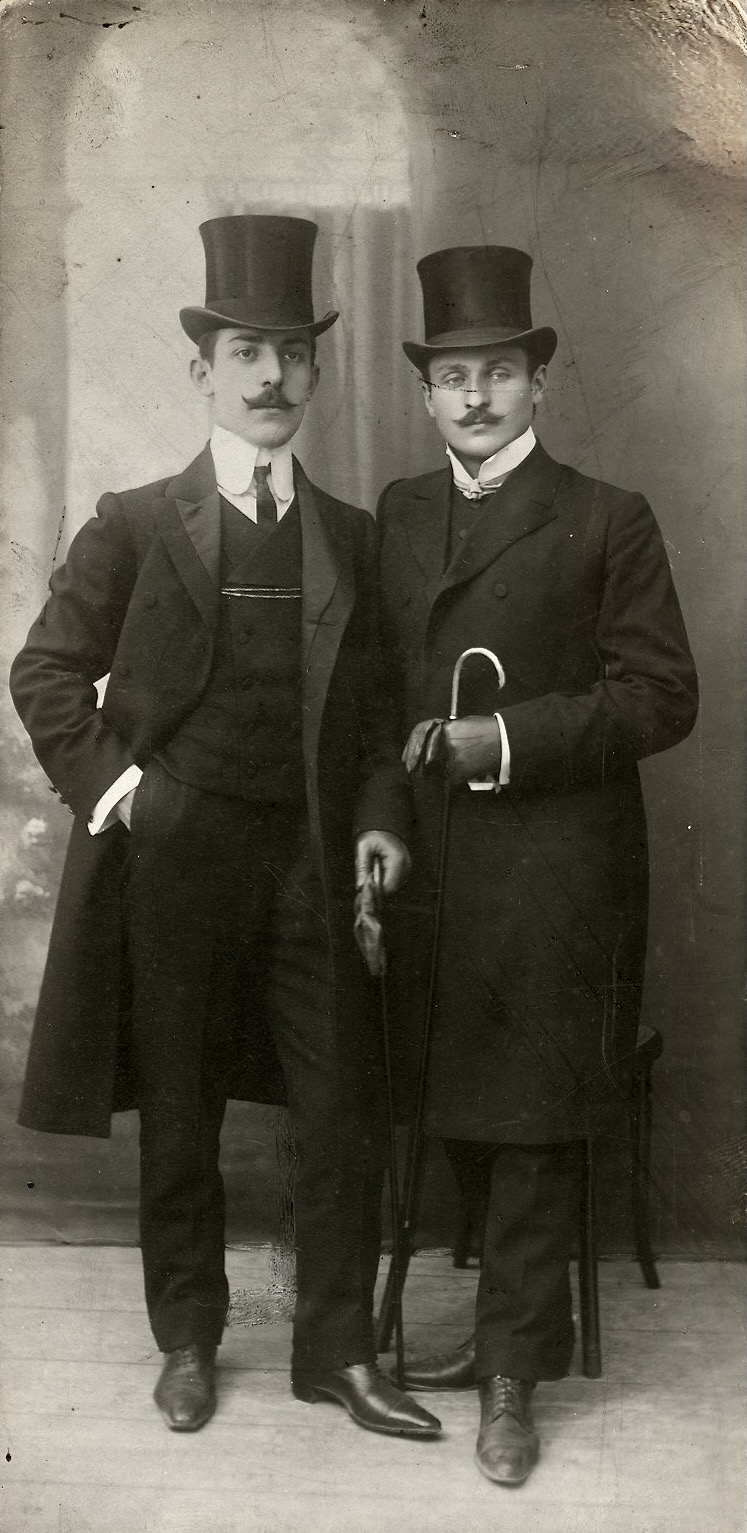
George and Leo Kereselidze, who were among the main organizers of the robbery, posing for a photo in Tbilisi, Georgia

A large scale robbery of Russian Imperial treasury occurred on 12 April 1906 (OS) in the Dusheti uezd of the Tiflis Governorate, in what is now Georgia, then part of the Russian Empire. It occurred with the backdrop of rising Georgian nationalism, as well as overall political instability that followed the Russian Revolution of 1905.

The robbery was masterminded by Georgian nationalists Leo Kereselidze, his brother George Kereselidze, and other militant members of the Georgian Socialist-Federalist Revolutionary Party. The intended purpose of the robbery was to finance pro-Georgian revolutionary activities aimed at securing additional political autonomy, and ultimately independence, from the Russian Empire. It was among the most significant robberies of its era, resulting in the theft of at least 315,000 rubles, (equivalent to ₽34 trillion in 2023). By some accounts, the stolen amount was even higher at 360,000 rubles, which made it a larger heist than the better known 1907 Tiflis bank robbery conducted by Joseph Stalin and his Bolshevik associates. Unlike the Tiflis bank robbery, however, the Socialist-Federalist heist in Dusheti did not involve killing.

== Preparation ==
Georgian officers of the Russian Imperial Army, who were on active duty in the region, had access to intelligence about the guard squad stationed at the Dushety treasury and relayed these sensitive details to the Kereselidze brothers. George Kreselidze then forged a decree issued by the Chief of Staff of the Caucasus Military District to a military commander located in Dusheti, ordering the removal of the treasury’s guard squad.

On March 26, a Socialist-Federalist accomplice impersonating a Caucasus Military District official, submitted the forged decree to the Mtskheta police office. On April 12 at midnight, a group of Socialist-Federalists who were disguised as soldiers of the 263rd Regiment guard squad were allowed to enter the compound by unsuspecting staff. The regiment of impersonators had ensured that every detail of their uniforms was accounted for, including the white-bottomed hats normally worn by the relevant regiment. As a result, the treasury employees opened the door to them. Upon gaining entry, the group disarmed and bound the treasury officials and made away with the money stored there. There were no deaths reported.

== Aftermath ==
Due to their involvement in this robbery, Leo and George Kereselidze became fugitives from the Russian police and fled to Geneva, Switzerland. At least some of the money stayed with Leo, who allegedly took it with him as he went into exile, with some members of the emigré community remarking on his apparent wealth. The rest of the funds were disbursed to the moderate wing of the party and largely spent on publishing subversive literature. Not everyone within the party was content with how the funds were distributed, which was apparently what led to the organizers of the robbery being reported to the Tsarist gendarmerie in the first place.

Russian diplomats approached the Swiss authorities with a request to arrest and extradite Leo, George, and their associate Nestor Magalashvili, for prosecution in Russia. All three were initially arrested in Geneva. During the trial, legal scholar Ernest Nys was among the experts who testified on the legality of Russia's annexation of Georgia starting in 1801 in violation of the Treaty of Georgievsk. Leo recalled that during the court hearings "everyone knew of Georgia’s right to fight Russia with weapons and all other means to restore independence". Ultimately, the Swiss Federal Tribunal acquitted all three defendants on February 12, 1907 after they successfully argued that Russia's case against them was politically motivated and took place with the backdrop of violent repressions.

== See also ==
- 1907 Tiflis bank robbery
- 1906 Helsinki bank robbery
