= Nikolay Burenin =

Personal details
- Born: Nikolay Yevgenyevich Burenin; December 17, 1874 Saint Petersburg, Russian Empire
- Died: June 30, 1962 (aged 87) Leningrad, Soviet Union
- Party: Russian Social Democratic Labour Party; Communist Party of the Soviet Union
- Occupation: Revolutionary, writer, pianist
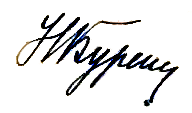
- Signature

Nikolay Yevgenyevich Burenin (Russian: Николай Евгеньевич Буренин, also known with aliases "German Fedorovich", "German", "Neburenin" and "Viktor Petrovich"; December 17, 1874 – June 30, 1962) was a Russian Bolshevik revolutionary, writer, concert pianist and music collector who worked as an organizer and specialist for Bolshevik illegal operations. He was a member of the Union of Soviet Writers.

== Life ==
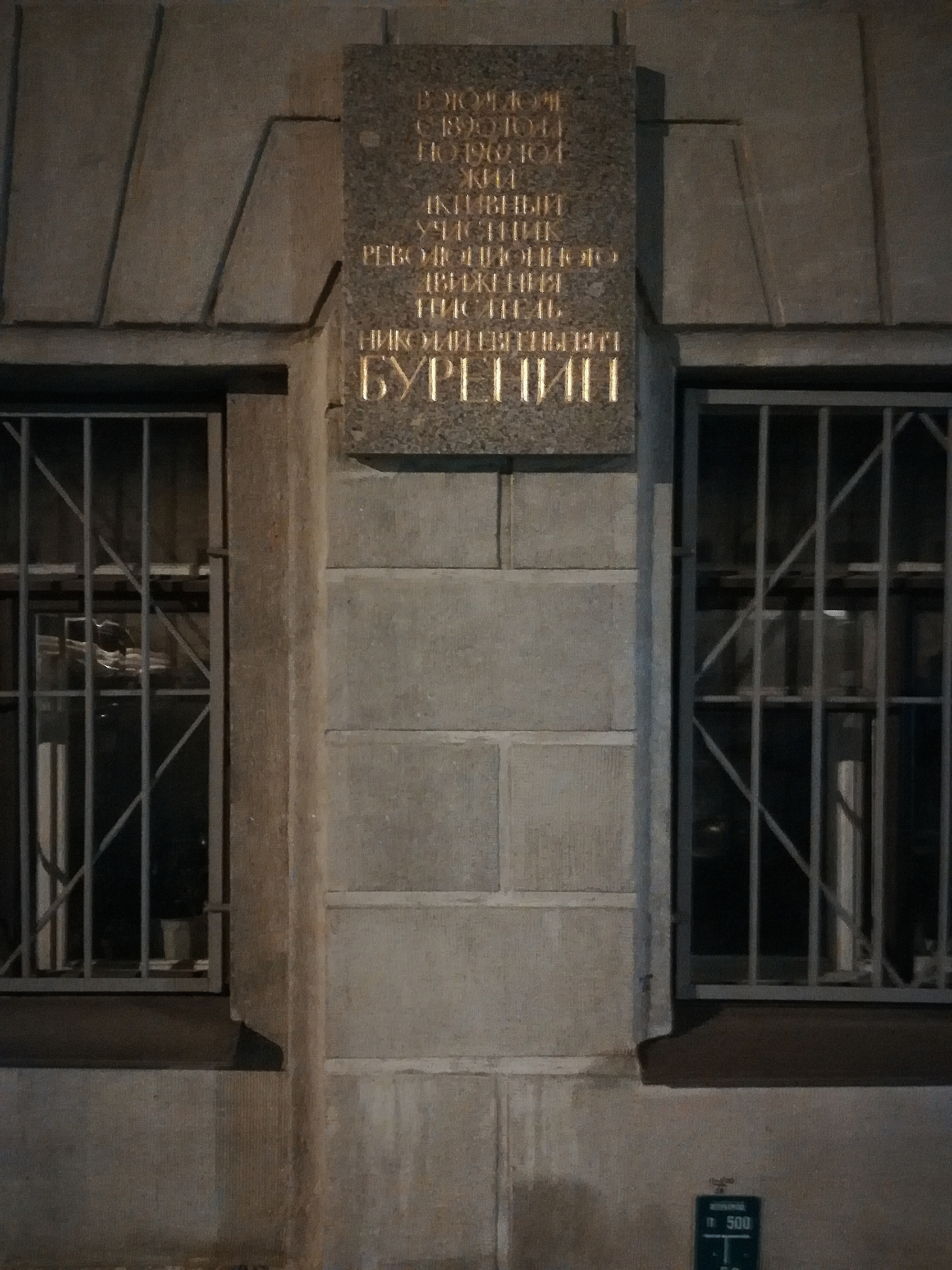
Commemorative plaque to Burenin in Saint-Petersburg.

Burenin was born in Saint Petersburg into a wealthy merchant family. He graduated from the Petrovskoye School of Commerce in 1892 and studied later at the Imperial Academy of Arts. He worked as concert pianist and joined the Russian revolutionary movement in 1901. Burenin was a member of the Russian Social Democratic Labour Party since 1904.

The Burenin family owned a mansion in Kirjasalo near the border between Russia and its autonomous part Grand Duchy of Finland. It was used for smuggling weapons and illegal literature across the border and for organizing border crossings for delegates of the 4th and 5th Congress of the Russian Social Democratic Labour Party. Transports arrived at the Roshchino railway station where they were picked by Burenin and his associates. He was also organizing underground printing presses and warehouses for propaganda literature, arranged safe houses and raised funds for the revolutionary action. Burenin was involved with the 1905 attempt to smuggle arms for the Finnish resistance with steamboat John Grafton and the 1906 robbery of Russian State Bank branch in Helsinki.

After the bank robbery Burenin traveled to the United States as Maxim Gorky's personal secretary on his fund-raising trip. In November 1906 Gorky, Maria Andreyeva and Burenin arrived in Italy. He spent three months on the island of Capri as Gorky stayed there for seven years. Burenin was arrested in 1907 and kept in Kresty Prison for one year but still continued his activities in the Bolshevik movement. After the October Revolution he worked in the People's Commissariat for Education and later in the theater department of the Department of Public Education in Saint Petersburg. In the 1920s Burenin served as a trade representative in Finland (1920–1925) and in Germany (1925–1929). In the early 1930s Burenin was working on the archives relating to the history of the Russian revolution. He retired in 1935. Burenin's memoirs were published posthumously in 1967.

== Memory ==
In the Krasnogvardeysky District of Saint Petersburg is a street named after Burenin. His musical collection is archived in the National Library of Russia. It is suggested that the character "Behemoth" in Mikhail Bulgakov's novel The Master and Margarita was inspired by Burenin.

== Works ==
- Три месяца на острове Капри (Three months on the Island of Capri, 1939)
- Люди большевистского подполья (People of the Bolshevik Underground, 1958)
- Памятные годы (Memoirs, 1967)

== Honors ==
- Order of the Red Banner of Labour
