= Elias Tcherikower =

Ukrainian Jewish historian

- Born: July 31, 1881; Poltava
- Died: August 8, 1943 (aged 62); New York City
- Occupation: Historian
- Known for: Historian of Jewish life and anti-Jewish violence in the Russian Empire; co-founder of YIVO
- Spouse: Rebecca Tcherikower (married circa 1910–1963)

Elias Tcherikower (Note: also known as Eliahu Tcherikover, Elye Tsherikover, Eliahu Tcherikower, Elias Tscherikower, and I. M. Cherikover) (Yiddish: אליהו טשעריקאָװער; July 31, 1881 – August 8, 1943) was a Ukrainian Jewish historian and co-founder of the Yiddish Scientific Institute (YIVO).

== Biography ==
Tcherikower was born and raised in Poltava, Russian Empire (now Ukraine), where his father was a pioneer of the Hovevei Zion movement. He attended gymnasium in Odessa, and went on to university in Saint Petersburg. His participation in the Russian revolutionary movement led to his arrest at a Menshevik meeting during the 1905 revolution, after which he spent a year in prison.

He published his first article – an essay in Russian on the Yiddish writer Sholem Yankev Abramovitsh ("Mendele Moykher Sforim: An attempt at a critical characteristic") – in 1905, in the Russian-language Zionist journal Evreiskaia zhizn (Jewish life). For the next ten years he wrote mainly in Russian; after 1915 most of his work was in Yiddish. Tcherikower contributed biographies and a variety of other articles to the Russian-language Jewish encyclopedia Evreiskaia entsiklopedia. He was also active in the Society for the Promotion of Culture among the Jews of Russia, an educational and civic association founded in 1863; he edited the society's journal and wrote a history of it that appeared in 1913 (Istoriia obshchestva dlia rasprostraneniia prosveshcheniia mezhdu evreiami v rossii).

During the First World War, Tcherikower spent time in the United States, arriving in New York City in the summer of 1915. There he had contact with the socialist Zionist leader and Yiddish linguist Ber Borochov, who was a childhood friend, and, under Borochov's influence, began to write in Yiddish for socialist- and nationalist-oriented Yiddish journals and newspapers. He returned to Russia sometime after the outbreak of the revolution in 1917, and then in late 1918 moved to Kyiv, in the newly independent state of Ukraine. At that time, under the Ukrainian People's Republic, ethnic minorities, including Jews, had been granted a degree of cultural and political autonomy. Tcherikower was active at the Folks-Verlag (People's press), one of several Yiddish publishing houses that operated in Kyiv around this time.

In the spring of 1919, a wave of anti-Jewish violence spread through Ukraine, including Kyiv, and Tcherikower turned his attention to gathering documentation of the events in the Jewish communities, leading the "Editorial Board for Collecting and Investigating Material Pertaining to the Pogroms in the Ukraine." Among his collaborators were Nokhem Shtif, Jacob Lestschinsky, Jacob Ze'ev Wolf Latzky Bertholdi, and Nokhem Gergel. The archive assembled by these scholars eventually served as the basis of several historical works in Yiddish about the events.

When the Soviets gained control of Ukraine in 1921, Tcherikower and other Yiddish activists in Kyiv fled the city; he and his wife Riva (Rebecca), taking the archive with them, went first to Moscow and then to Berlin. A significant contingent of Russian Jewish artists and scholars similarly took up residence in Berlin in the early 1920s, including the scholars with whom Tcherikower had worked in Kyiv, as well as the esteemed Jewish historian Simon Dubnow, whom Tcherikower regarded as a mentor. During this period several Yiddish and Hebrew publishing houses were established in Berlin, providing Tcherikower and his colleagues opportunities to publish scholarly works in Yiddish.

In August 1925, at a conference held in Berlin, Tcherikower, along with Max Weinreich and Nokhem Shtif, was among the co-founders of the Jewish research institute YIVO, dedicated to East European Jewish history and culture. Although the institute initially had its central office in Berlin, much of its activities were centered in Vilna (Vilnius, Lithuania), which became its official headquarters within the following year. Tcherikower became the leader of the Historical Section of the new institute (one of four research divisions), which held its founding meeting on October 31, 1925 at Dubnow's apartment in Berlin.

In 1926 to 1927, Tcherikower played a key role in the preparation of the defense of Sholom Schwartzbard, who was on trial in Paris for the assassination of the Ukrainian leader Symon Petliura, and who had allegedly acted in retaliation for Petliura's role in the pogroms carried out by Ukrainian forces in 1919, during the Russian Civil War. In this work Tcherikower, assisted by his wife, brought to bear materials in the pogrom-related archive he and his colleagues had assembled.

Tcherikower is also often remembered for his research on the notorious Protocols of the Elders of Zion in the context of the Berne Trial of 1933–1935. He headed a group of historians, including Vladimir Burtsev and Sergei Svatikov, who gathered evidence and gave testimony for the prosecution concerning the fraudulent nature of the Protocols.

In 1939 Tcherikower, then living in France, co-edited, with Yisroel (Israel) Efroykin (1884–1954), the new Yiddish-language journal Oyfn sheydveg (At the Crossroads), with Zelig Kalmanovitch as a major contributor. The three colleagues, who had all advocated for diaspora nationalism and Yiddishism, aimed to reevaluate their cultural and political views on the future of the Jewish people.

When the Germans invaded France in June 1940, Tcherikower and his wife fled their Paris apartment, and headed for the south of France. They eventually managed to obtain visas with the help of the American branch of YIVO, and emigrated to the United States in September 1940, settling in New York City.

Tcherikower had continued to chair the Historical Section of YIVO until 1939, and after his arrival in New York he served as the section's research secretary at YIVO's new headquarters there. He died in New York City in 1943.

== Personal life ==
Tcherikower's wife Riva, or Rebecca Tcherikower (née Teplitsky) (1884–1963) was his life partner from the time of his youth; they married around 1910. After the couple settled in New York City, in 1940, Rebecca Tcherikower worked as an archivist at the new YIVO headquarters (YIVO Institute for Jewish Research). She died in New York on July 7, 1963.

== Works ==
In English

- "Jewish Martyrology and Jewish Historiography." Yivo Annual of Jewish Social Science, vol. 1 (1946), p. 9–23

In Yiddish

- Antisemitizm un pogromen in Ukraine in di yorn 1917–1918 [Anti-Semitism and pogroms in the Ukraine in the years 1917–1918]. Berlin: Yidisher literarisher farlag, 1923
- Di Ukrainer pogromen in yor 1919 [The Ukrainian pogroms in 1919]. New York: YIVO, 1965

== See also ==
- Berne Trial
- Henryk Baran
- Protocols of Zion
