= List of writers on antisemitism =

This is a list of authors in the field of antisemitism in alphabetical order.

== A ==
- Yitzchok Adlerstein
- Theodor W. Adorno
- Götz Aly
- Yitzhak Arad
- Hannah Arendt
- Dan Ariely

== B ==
- Henryk Baran
- Mitchell G. Bard
- Avraham Barkai
- Yehuda Bauer
- Zygmunt Bauman
- Joel Beinin
- Wolfgang Benz
- Michael Berenbaum
- Werner Bergmann
- Randolph L. Braham
- Martin Broszat
- Christopher Browning
- Barbara Stern Burstin

== C ==
- David Cesarani
- Phyllis Chesler
- Detlev Claussen
- Richard I. Cohen
- Irwin Cotler
- John S. Curtiss

== D ==
- Lucy Dawidowicz
- Cesare G. De Michelis
- Jacques Derrida
- Alan Dershowitz
- Dan Diner
- Bernward Dörner
- Debórah Dwork

== E ==
- Todd Endelman
- David Engel
- Robert Ericksen
- Yoram Ettinger
- Andrew Ezergailis

== F ==
- Avner Falk
- Michael C. Fenenbock
- Norman Finkelstein
- Wolfgang Frindte
- Reuven Firestone
- Jack Fischel
- Abraham Foxman
- Edward Flannery
- Paula Fredriksen
- Lillian C. Freudmann

== G ==
- Jane Gerber
- Manfred Gerstenfeld
- Sander Gilman
- Andrew Goldberg
- Daniel Goldhagen
- Stephan Grigat
- Tom Gross

== H ==
- Arthur Hertzberg
- Raul Hilberg
- David Hirsh
- Colin Holmes
- Klaus Holz
- Max Horkheimer

== I ==
- Jules Isaac

== J ==
- Amy-Jill Levine
- Josef Joffe
- Steven L. Jacobs

== K ==
- Jacob Katz
- Brian Klug
- Daniel Kulla
- Matthias Küntzel

== L ==
- Günther Lachmann
- Richard Landes
- Gavin I. Langmuir
- Claude Lanzmann
- Walter Laqueur
- Gisela C. Lebzelter
- Primo Levi
- Emmanuel Levinas
- Richard S. Levy
- Bernard Lewis
- Albert Lindemann
- Deborah Lipstadt
- Peter Longerich
- Yaacov Lozowick

== M ==
- Kevin B. MacDonald
- Paul Wilhelm Massing
- David Meir-Levi
- Albert Memmi

== N ==
- János Nyíri

== P ==
- Talcott Parsons
- Kurt Pätzold
- Armin Pfahl-Traughber
- Léon Poliakov
- Moishe Postone

== R ==
- Doron Rabinovici
- Hans-Peter Raddatz
- Eva Gabriele Reichmann
- Lars Rensmann
- Amnon Rubinstein

== S ==
- Jonathan Sacks
- Samuel Sandmel
- Jean-Paul Sartre
- Wolfgang Scheffler (historian)
- Gabriel Schoenfeld
- Julius H. Schoeps
- Ulrich Sieg
- Ernst Simmel
- Charles A. Small
- Sybille Steinbacher
- Gabor Steingart
- Kenneth S. Stern

== T ==
- Pierre-André Taguieff
- Tilman Tarach

== U ==
- Udo Ulfkotte

== V ==
- Shulamit Volkov

== W ==
- Peter Waldbauer
- Bari Weiss (born 1984) - opinion writer and editor
- John Weiss (born 1927)
- Alfred Wiener
- René Wildangel
- Robert Wistrich
- Michael Wolffsohn

== See also ==
- Anti-Zionism
- Bibliography of The Holocaust
- Israel studies
- Zionism
