= Michael Hagemeister =

German historian (born 1951)

Michael Hagemeister (born 9 January 1951) is a German historian and Slavist, an authority on The Protocols of the Elders of Zion and on Sergei Nilus.

Hagemeister was employed at the universities of Marburg, Bochum, Basel, Innsbruck, Frankfurt (Oder) (Viadrina European University), and Berlin. Hagemeister served as researcher at the Department of History of the University of Basel and as temporary professor at the Department of History of LMU Munich and at the Department of East European History at Viadrina European University, Frankfurt (Oder).

Hagemeister wrote his doctoral thesis on the Russian philosopher Nikolai Fyodorov (1829–1903). In his current research he concentrates on the origins and early history of The Protocols of the Elders of Zion and the life and work of the Russian religious and apocalyptic writer Sergei Nilus (1862–1929).

== Early life ==
Hagemeister was born on 9 January 1951 in Ellwangen, Baden-Württemberg.

== Research on the Protocols ==
The Protocols of the Elders of Zion, first published in the Russian Empire in 1903, is a well-known forgery that claims to detail a long-term Jewish plan for world domination. The origins of the document are shrouded in mystery and many theories have been proposed. The theory that had received the most support until recently was presented at the Berne Trial of 1933–1935, in which two Jewish organizations sued the Swiss distributors of the Protocols. The plaintiffs invited witnesses who testified that the Protocols was originally written in France in the late 1890s by agents of the Russian secret police and later translated into Russian. According to their version, the main perpetrators were police commander Pyotr Rachkovsky and his unsavoury collaborator Matvei Golovinski. This account became generally accepted following the publication of Norman Cohn's Warrant for Genocide in 1966, which added many details to it.

Hagemeister's research into the origins of the Protocols led him to discount both the French origin of the document and the involvement of the Russian secret police. He discovered that the chief witness for the prosecution at the Berne trial had demanded a large sum of money in advance and that the plaintiffs themselves considered him highly suspect. His historical research supports the textual analysis of Cesare G. De Michelis, who concluded that the forgery was originally written in Russian in 1902–3 by unknown person(s). Among the experts who have accepted Hagemeister's theory is Richard S. Levy, who called him "the leading authority on this subject".

== Publications ==
- Die Protokolle der Weisen von Zion’ - eine Anti-Utopie oder der Große Plan in der Geschichte? (‘The Protocols of the Elders of Zion’ - an anti-Utopia or the Great Plan in History’),
- Vladimir Solov’ev and Sergej Nilus: Apocalypticism and Judeophobia,
- The Protocols of the Elders of Zion and the Myth of a Jewish Conspiracy in Post-Soviet Russia,
- The Protocols of the Elders of Zion: Between History and Fiction,
- Anti-Semitism, Occultism, and Theories of Conspiracy in Contemporary Russia – The Case of Ilya Glazunov,
- Die Eroberung des Raums und die Beherrschung der Zeit: Utopische, apokalyptische und magisch-okkulte Elemente in den Zukunftsentwürfen der Sowjetzeit (‘The Conquest of Space and the Mastery of Time: Utopian, Apocalyptic and Magical-Occult Elements in the Future Designs of the Soviet Era’),
- The Protocols of the Elders of Zion and the Myth of a Jewish Conspiracy in Post-Soviet Russia,
- Russian Émigrés in the Bern Trial of the “Protocols of the Elders of Zion” (1933-1935),
- The Protocols of the Elders of Zion in Court. The Bern Trials, 1933-1937,
- The Conquest of Space and the Bliss of the Atoms – Konstantin Tsiolkovskii,
- Konstantin Tsiolkovskii and the Occult Roots of Soviet Space Travel,
- “The Antichrist as an Imminent Political Possibility”. Sergei Nilus and the Apocalyptical Reading of The Protocols of the Elders of Zion,
- The American Connection. Leslie Fry and the Protocols of the Elders of Zion,
- The Protocols of the Elders of Zion – a Forgery?
- The Perennial Conspiracy Theory: Reflections on the History of the Protocols of the Elders of Zion
- (Together with Boris Groys, as editor) Die Neue Menschheit. Biopolitische Utopien in Rußland zu Beginn des zwanzigsten Jahrhunderts (The New Humankind. Biopolitical Utopias in Russia at the Beginning of the Twentieth Century).
- (Together with Birgit Menzel and Bernice Rosenthal, as editor) The New Age of Russia. Occult and Esoteric Dimensions.
- (Together with Eva Horn, as editor) Die Fiktion von der jüdischen Weltverschwörung. Zu Text und Kontext der „Protokolle der Weisen von Zion“ (The Fiction of the Jewish World-Conspiracy. Text and Context of the „Protocols of the Elders of Zion“).
