= Matvei Golovinski =

Russian-French journalist and writer

Matvei Vasilyevich Golovinski (alternatively, Mathieu) (Russian: Матвей Васильевич Головинский) (6 March 1865 – 1920) was a Russian-French writer, journalist and political activist. He is a leading suspected writer of The Protocols of the Elders of Zion a work of black propaganda to convince the public they were being targeted by International Jewry. Scholars supporting Golovinski's authorship include modern Russian historian Mikhail Lepekhine, who in 1999 studied previously closed French archives stored in Moscow containing information supporting the claim. Golovinski was a colleage of Pyotr Rachkovsky, who was similarly linked to the Protocols in the Berne Trial.

== Life ==
Matvei Golovinski was born into an aristocratic family in the village of Ivashevka (Ивашевка), in the Syzransky Uyezd of the Simbirsk Governorate of the Russian Empire. His father, Vasili Golovinski (Василий Головинский) was a friend of Fyodor Dostoyevsky. Both were members of the progressive Petrashevsky Circle, sentenced to the capital punishment as conspirators and both were pardoned later. Vasili Golovinski died in 1875 and Matvei Golovinski was reared by his mother and the French nanny.

While studying jurisprudence, Golovinski joined an antisemitic counter-revolutionary group Holy Brotherhood ("Святое Братство"). Upon graduation, he worked for the Okhrana, secretly arranging pro-government coverage in the press. Golovinski's career almost collapsed and he had to leave the country after his activities were publicly exposed by Maxim Gorky. In France, he wrote and published articles on assignments of the Chief of Russian secret service in Paris, Pyotr Rachkovsky.

After the October Revolution of 1917, Golovinsky switched sides and worked for the Bolsheviks until his death in 1920.

== Authorship of the Protocols ==
On 19 November 1999, Patrick Bishop reported from Paris:

Research by a leading Russian historian, Mikhail Lepekhine, in recently opened archives has found the forgery to be the work of Mathieu Golovinski, opportunistic scion of an aristocratic but rebellious family that drifted into a life of espionage and propaganda work. After working for the czarist secret service, he later changed sides and joined the Bolsheviks. Mr. Lepekhine’s findings, published in the French magazine L'Express, would appear to clear up the last remaining mystery surrounding the Protocols.

In his 2001 book The Question of the Authorship of "The Protocols of the Elders of Zion", a Ukrainian scholar Vadim Skuratovsky offers a scrupulous and extensive literary, historical and linguistic analysis of the original Russian language text of the Protocols. Skuratovsky provides evidence that Charles Joly, a son of Maurice Joly (on whose writings the Protocols are based), visited Saint Petersburg in 1902 and that Golovinsky and Charles Joly worked together at Le Figaro in Paris. Skuratovsky also traces the influences of Dostoyevsky's prose (in particular, The Grand Inquisitor and The Possessed) on Golovinsky's writings, including The Protocols.

In his book The Non-Existent Manuscript. A Study of the Protocols of the Sages of Zion, Italian researcher Cesare De Michelis writes that the hypothesis of Golovinski's authorship was based on a statement by Princess Catherine Radziwill, who claimed that she had seen a manuscript of the Protocols written by Golovinsky, Rachkovsky and Manusevich in 1905, but in 1905 Golovinsky and Rachkovsky had already left Paris and moved to Saint-Petersburg. Princess Radziwill was known to be an unreliable source. Also, the protocols had been mentioned already in the press in 1902.

Golovinski had been linked to the work before; the German writer Konrad Heiden identified him as an author of the Protocols in 1944.

== Books ==
- A New English-Russian and Russian-English Dictionary. London, 1912. (Many later editions.)

Published under the pen-name of Doctor Faust:

- From a Writer's Notebook. M. M. Levin edition. Moscow, 1910. [Belles-lettres and autobiographical prose]
- The Black Book of German Atrocities. Saint Peterburg, 1914.
- An Experience of Criticism of Bourgeois Morals. A. Karelin's translation from French. With a preface by the author. 1919. (The supposed 1910 French original has not been discovered.)
- Conversations with My Grandfather about Typhus. Published by V.M. Bonch-Bruevich (Velichkinoj).

== In popular culture ==
Golovinsky appears in Umberto Eco's novel The Cemetery of Prague, in which he receives the first draft of Protocols from the unreliable narrator, Simonini, who has created them at the behest of Rachkovsky.
