= Alexandre du Chayla =

Count Armand Alexandre de Blanquet du Chayla (25 March 1885 – 1945) was a French nobleman who converted to Russian Orthodoxy. He is chiefly remembered for giving crucial evidence and/or testimony for the prosecution at the Berne Trial in 1935 against the notorious Protocols of Zion.

Du Chayla had been a journalist at the time of the 1913 blood-libel trial of Mendel Beilis and had written in support of the accusation. At Berne he insisted on payment of 4,000 Swiss francs for his testimony, which the plaintiffs found difficulty raising. Michael Hagemeister wrote that du Chayla's testimony was full of factual errors and inconsistencies, but unfortunately still taints the historiography of the Protocols.

== See also ==
- Berne Trial
- Henryk Baran
- Protocols of Zion
