= The Dialogue in Hell Between Machiavelli and Montesquieu =

Nineteenth century French political satire

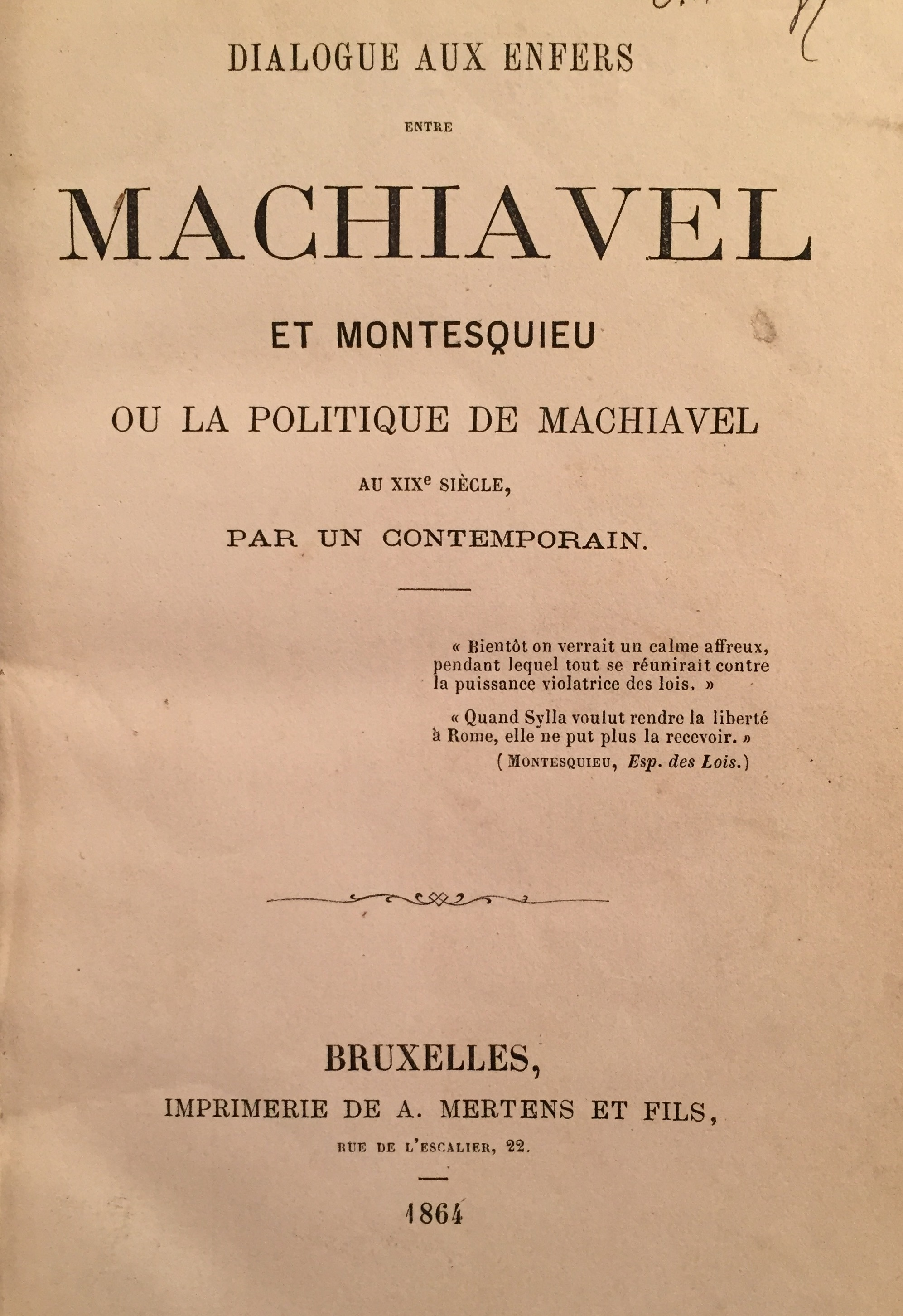
- Dialogue aux enfers, 1864
- Author: Maurice Joly
- Original title: Dialogue aux enfers entre Machiavel et Montesquieu
- Genre: Parody, Dialogue
- Publication date: 1864

The Dialogue in Hell Between Machiavelli and Montesquieu (in the original French, Dialogue aux enfers entre Machiavel et Montesquieu ou la politique de Machiavel au XIXe siècle) is a political satire written by French attorney Maurice Joly (initially released anonymously in Brussels, Belgium, under the generic label of "a contemporary") in protest against the regime of Napoleon III (a.k.a. Louis-Napoléon Bonaparte), who ruled France from 1848 to 1870. It was translated into English in 2002. Small portions were translated in 1967 as an appendix to Norman Cohn's Warrant for Genocide, which identifies it as the main source of the later Protocols of the Elders of Zion, though The Dialogue itself makes no mention of Jews.

The piece uses the literary device of a dialogue of the dead, invented by ancient Roman writer Lucian and introduced into the French belles-lettres by Bernard de Fontenelle in the 18th century. Shadows of the historical characters of Niccolò Machiavelli and Montesquieu meet in Hell in the year 1864 and dispute on politics. In this way Joly tried to cover up a direct, and then illegal, criticism of Louis-Napoleon's rule.

== Summary ==
Joly relates in his 1870 autobiography that one evening, while thinking of economist Abbé Galiani's treatise Dialogues sur le commerce des blés ("Dialogues on the commerce in wheat") and walking by Pont Royal, he was inspired to write a dialogue between Montesquieu and Machiavelli. The noble baron Montesquieu would make the case for liberalism; the Florentine politician Machiavelli would present the case for despotism.

Machiavelli claims that he "... wouldn't even need twenty years to transform utterly the most indomitable European character and render it as a docile under tyranny as the debased people of Asia". Montesquieu insists that the liberal spirit of the peoples is invincible. In 25 dialogues, step by step, Machiavelli, who by Joly's plot covertly represents Napoleon III, explains how he would replace freedom with despotism in any given European country: "... Absolute power will no longer be an accident of fortune but will become a need" of the modern society. At the end, Machiavelli prevails. In the curtain-line Montesquieu exclaims "Eternal God, what have you permitted!...".

The book was published anonymously (par un contemporain, by a contemporary) in Brussels in 1864 and smuggled into France for distribution, but the print run was seized by the police immediately upon crossing the border. The police swiftly tracked down its author, and Joly was arrested. The book was banned. On 25 April 1865, he was sentenced to 18 months at the Sainte-Pélagie Prison in Paris. The second edition of "Dialogues" was issued in 1868 under Joly's name.

Campaigning against Napoleon III at the 1870 French constitutional referendum, Joly wrote an epilogue to his "Dialogue". It was published at Le Gaulois and La Cloche magazines.

== Legacy ==
In the beginning of the 20th century Joly's book was used as a basis for The Protocols of the Elders of Zion, an infamous Russian-made antisemitic literary forgery. There is an abundance of evidence (some of which was presented at the Berne Trial) that The Protocols were lavishly plagiarized from The Dialogue.

Joly's book, however, was a satire on French politics of the Second Republic and Second Empire and contained no antisemitic material (or indeed any references to Jews at all); the anonymous authors of the Protocols interpolated a sinister Jewish cabal for the original's references to members of the government of Napoleon III.
