= Henryk Baran =

American academic

Henryk Baran is a scholar, author, and professor currently at the State University of New York, Albany (SUNY) holding a position in the Department of Languages, Literature & Culture. He is particularly immersed in the Russian language and culture. He is also an authority on the 'career' of Protocols of Zion in the former Russian Empire.

After attending the Bronx High School of Science, and achieving early admission to MIT, Prof. Baran received his B.S. in mathematics from the Massachusetts Institute of Technology in 1967. He received his M.A. in Slavic languages and Literature from Harvard University in 1969, and his Ph.D. in 1976.

Of particular interest to historians of the notorious Protocols of Zion is Baran's presentation of his research on two individuals, Sergei Svatikov (1880–1942), and Alexandre du Chayla (1885–1945). The former was a historian, and a political figure. The latter was a French nobleman who converted to Russian Orthodoxy. Both played significant roles, on the side of the prosecution against the Protocols, at the Berne Trial of 1935. Until this presentation, not much was known about these individuals apart from their public participation at said trial. Prof. Baran made his presentation (in a paper) based on Western and Russian archival repositories. His paper presents new light on the relationship among Svatikov, Du Chayla, and on other individuals who either presented evidence or testified at the Berne Trial. Other individuals considered include Elias Tscherikower, a historian, and Vladimir Burtsev, a journalist and a political figure.

== Academic focus ==
Russian Silver Age literature, Russian avant-garde; poetics; history of Slavic philology within a broad intellectual and political context; history of the forgery "Protocols of the Elders of Zion"

== Life ==
Three-time Fulbright Award winner, Henryk Baran of the Department of Languages, Literatures, and Cultures has taught more than 60 courses in his long career, and was recognized for his research contributions last July with an honorary doctorate from the Russian State University for the Humanities in Moscow.

Baran received his graduate training in the Slavic Department of Harvard University, where he studied with Roman Jakobson, one of the leading scholars of language, literature and linguistics in the 20th century and an expert on Russian poetry. Baran's dissertation was a study of Russian futurist poet Velmir Khlebnikov. Even before completing his dissertation, he published two papers on Khlebnikov, one in a festschrift for Taranovsky and the other in the literary journal Russian Literature. Baran's research has been included in 70 articles and book chapters, as well as four edited books. A founding editor of Elementa: Journal of Slavic Studies and Comparative Cultural Semiotics, Baran was also associate editor of the Slavic and East European Journal.

His administrative experience at UAlbany includes seven years as department chair and service as graduate adviser and coordinator for the Slavic studies program. Baran has also been invited to speak at some of the most prestigious departments and programs both here and abroad, including those at Harvard, Princeton, NYU, Ohio State University, Oberlin College, Institute of Russian Language (Moscow), Institute of World Literature (Moscow), Helsinki University and Russian State University of the Humanities (Moscow).

== Works ==
- Semiotics and structuralism:

readings from the Soviet Union
edited with an introduction by Henryk Baran
translated by William Mandel, Henryk Baran, and A. J. Hollander
(White Plains, NY: International Arts and Science Press, 1976)
ISBN 0-87332-075-1

- Jakobsonian poetics and Slavic narrative:

from Pushkin to Solzhenitsyn
Krystyna Pomorska; edited by Henryk Baran.
(Durham, NC: Duke University Press, 1992)
ISBN 0-8223-1233-6

- Roman I︠A︡kobson:

teksty, dokumenty, issledovanii︠a︡
[redakt︠s︡ionnai︠a︡ kollegii︠a︡, Kh. Báran (otv. redaktor) ... et al.]
= Roman Jakobson : texts, documents, studies / [editorial board, Henryk Baran (chair) ... et al.]
(Moskva: Rossiĭskiĭ gos. gumanitarnyĭ universitet, 1999)
ISBN 5-7281-0261-1

- Evaluation of education and research in Slavonic and Baltic studies

Henryk Baran ... [et al.]
(Helsinki: Edita, 2000?)
ISBN 951-37-3294-0

- O Khlebnikove: konteksty, istochniki, mify

Khenrik Baran.
(Moskva: Rossiĭskiĭ gos. gumanitarnyĭ universitet, 2002)
ISBN 5-7281-0337-5

- Pisʹma i zametki N.S. Trubet︠s︡kogo

[vstup. st. V.N. Toporova; podgot. k izd. R. I︠A︡kobsona pri uchastii Kh. Barana, O. Ronena, M. Teĭlor]
(Moskva: I︠A︡zyki slavi︠a︡nskoĭ kulʹtury, 1975, 2004)
ISBN 5-94457-170-5
