= Byloye =

Petersburg magazine (1906 -1907 and 1917 - 1926)

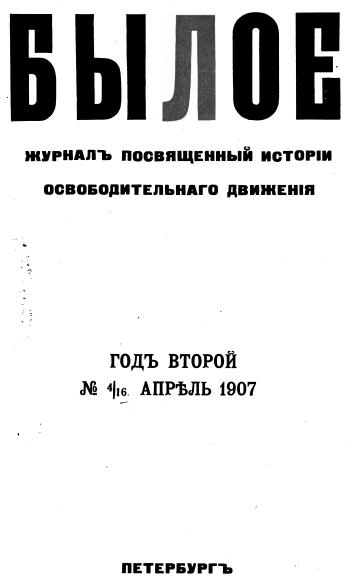
- Cover of issue n. 4, April 1907, of Byloye
- Editor: Vasily Yakovlevich Bogucharsky
- Editor: Pavel Eliseevich Shchegolev
- Editor: Vladimir L. Burtsev
- Categories: History
- Frequency: Monthly
- Circulation: 30,000 (1906–1907); 6,000 (1917–1926)
- Publisher: Nikolay Elpidiforovich Paramonov (from 1906); Pavel E. Shchegolev (from 1917); Vladimir L. Burtsev
- Founder: Vladimir L. Burtsev
- First issue: 1900
- Final issue: 1926
- Country: Russian Empire
- Based in: London; Geneva; Paris; Saint Petersburg
- Language: Russian
- OCLC: 5665918

Byloye (Russian: Былое, The Past) was a monthly historical magazine published in the Russian Empire by Nikolay Elpidiforovich Paramonov and edited by Vasily Y. Bogucharsky (1861–1915), Pavel E. Shchegolev (1877–1931) and Vladimir L. Burtsev (1862–1942).

Published during 1900–1907, 1908–1912 and 1917–1926, its focus was the history of the revolutionary movement in Russia, from the 18th century to the Russian Revolution of 1905-1907.

== History ==
Between 1900 and 1904, Vladimir Burtsev published 6 issues abroad, in London, Geneva and Paris. Its contents were on the 1860–1880s movements, especially about Narodnaya Volya (People's Will), a populist terrorist organisation, whose views and tactics were idealised by the magazine. Some of the materials published were old illegal literature, but also unreleased memoirs.

In the late autumn of 1905, Burtsev returned to Russia from exile and asked permission to the authorities to publish Byloye, which he was immediately denied. He convinced Bogucharsky and Shchegolev to become editors of the magazine, and got Nikolay Elpidiforovich Paramonov (1876–1951), owner of the Donskaya Rech publishing house, to publish the magazine.

On January 28, 1906, Byloye was reprinted in Saint Petersburg, Russia, following censorship approval, with a monthly edition under the subheading Журналъ пocвященный иcтopiи ocвoбoдитeльнaгo движeнiя (Journal dedicated to the history of the revolutionary movement).

In October 1907, by decree of the St. Petersburg gradonachalnik, publication of Byloye was suspended.

In March 1909, by decision of the St. Petersburg Trial Chamber, Shchegolev was sentenced to three years of solitary confinement "for distributing works with the deliberate intention of provoking rebellion". Bogucharsky was deported abroad, and Burtsev, who had experience in being repeatedly expelled, left Russia in good time. Byloye resumed publication in 1917 and continued until 1926, published and edited by Shchegolev.
