= Sergei Svatikov =

Russian historian and political figure (1880–1942)

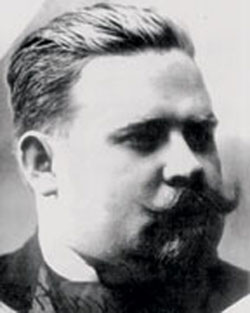
Sergei Svatikov

Sergei Grigorievich Svatikov (Russian: Серге́й Григо́рьевич Сва́тиков; 1880 – 25 January 1942) was a Russian historian and political figure who presented critical evidence and/or testimony in 1935 in the Berne Trial regarding the notorious Protocols of Zion.

== See also ==
- Berne Trial
- Henryk Baran
