= Arthur Baumgarten =

German-Swiss jurist and legal philosopher)

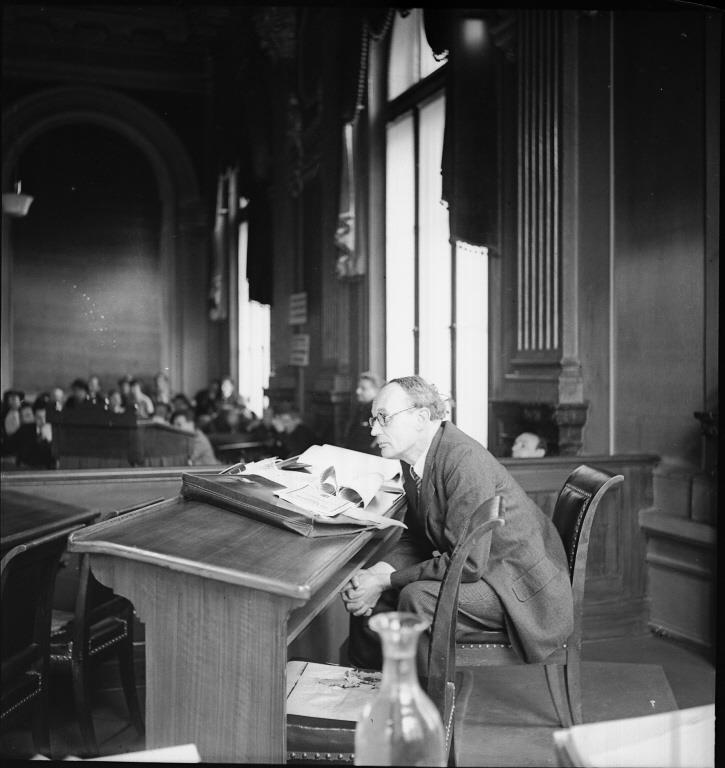
Arthur Baumgarten, 1935 at the Berne Trial

Arthur Edwin Paul Baumgarten (31 March 1884 in Königsberg, East Prussia – 27 November 1966 in East Berlin, East Germany) was a German-Swiss jurist and legal philosopher. After voluntary exile in Switzerland, Baumgarten became a prominent legal scholar in East Germany.

== Biography ==
Baumgarten was born on 31 March 1884 in Königsberg, East Prussia, a son of the anatomist and bacteriologist Paul Baumgarten. He visited the Humanistisches Gymnasium in Tübingen, where he graduated in 1902, and went on to study jurisprudence in Tübingen, Geneva and Leipzig.

He earned a doctorate in jurisprudence in 1909 in Berlin. His doctoral advisor was Franz von Liszt. In the same year, he became professor for criminal law at the University of Cologne. In the years from 1923 to 1930, he taught in Basel. Following a stay in Frankfurt am Main, Baumgarten chose voluntary exile in Switzerland by returning to Basel, as the Nazis eventually took power in Germany in the summer of 1933. There he taught legal philosophy from 1933 to 1946.

In 1935, he visited the Soviet Union, where he contacted likewise exiled German communists. In 1944, he co-founded the Swiss Party of Labor.

In 1946, he accepted an invitation as visiting professor in Leipzig. Eventually, he was appointed full professor in Berlin in 1948. From 1952 to 1960, he was the president of German Academy for State- and Legal Sciences.

Baumgarten died on 27 November 1966 in Berlin, East Germany. He remained a Swiss citizen until his death.

== Legacy ==
Baumgarten's main field of interest was legal philosophy. Originally unimpressed and opposed to Marxism and socialist conceptions of life, he later turned towards Marxism himself. As a legal philosopher, he sought to combine the ideals of the Age of Enlightenment and a Marxist interpretation of socialism. Albeit briefly an important figure in legal affairs in young East Germany, his views were in content largely opposed by East German legal theory dominated by figures like Walter Ulbricht and Karl Polak. Despite similar views having been popular among some of his contemporaries, such as Karl Bönninger and Hermann Klenner, they were suppressed early-on by Ulbricht and Polak, most notably at the Babelsberg Conference. While Baumgarten was always held in high regard at a personal level, the influence of Ulbricht and Polak caused his ideas to gain little traction in the audience of the time.
