= Cesare G. De Michelis =

Professor of Russian literature

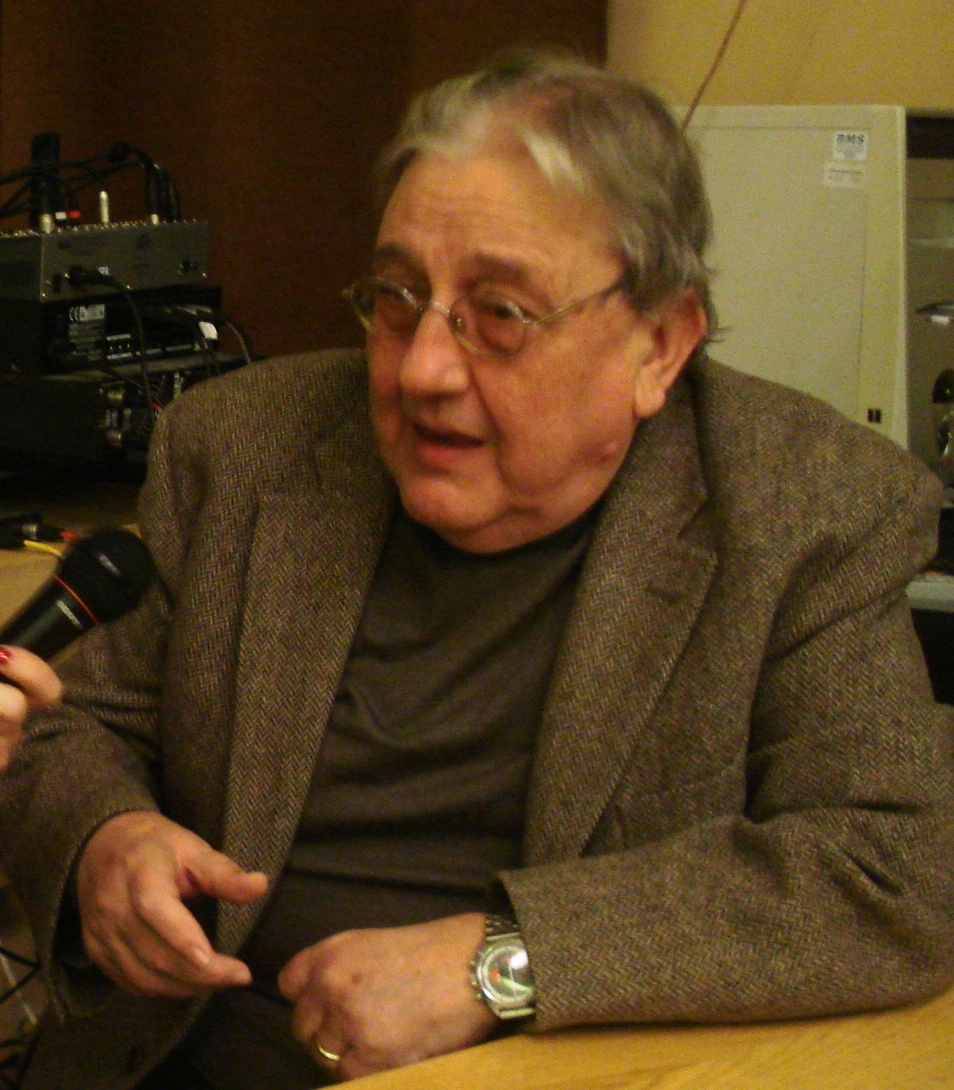

Cesare G. De Michelis (born 20 April 1944) is a scholar and professor of Russian literature at the University of Rome Tor Vergata, Italy.

== Biography ==
De Michelis was born in Rome. He is also an authority on the notorious plagiarism, hoax, and literary forgery known as The Protocols of the Elders of Zion. According to de Michelis, "twenty-odd editions had appeared in Russia between 1903 and 1912". He gives the text the acronymous name, "PSM", from its Russian title (romanized) Protocoly sionskikh mudretsov (Cyrillic: Протоколы сионских мудрецов). He also informs us that in 1919 PSM entered the "world at large" in "German, Swedish, Polish, English, Hungarian, and French editions." The first edition in Italian appeared in 1921. Arguably the analysis by De Michelis of the Protocols of the Learned Elders of Zion is the most important work on the subject since the publication of Norman Cohn's Warrant for Genocide in 1967/1970.

== Work ==
Pages 183-395 are a reconstruction of the original Russian manuscript as it hypothetically existed. The transliterated three-word title of the tract is Protocols [of the] Zionist Elders (the source of the acronym "PSM"). The rest of the book (pages 1–182 and 396-419) is the scholarly textual, philological, and bibliographical study of the antisemitic text. The author claims that he has identified and authenticated nine distinct printings of five editions of this single text, which may be reduced to three redactions.

1. K: original; an apparent work in progress.
2. X: second redaction.
3. Y: third redaction.

The full list of printings and editions are as follows.

- Q: hypothetical source proposed by Michelis, providing the basis for K and Y.
  - M: Mikhail Osipovich Menshikov (1902) - The first textual reference to the Protocols, in a far-right newspaper article; claims that they were stolen by a "French journalist" in Nice, and quotes a line.
  - K: Krusevan, P. (1903) - Michelis demonstrates that this is the earliest version, but it was published in a tiny, poor-quality paper, vanished from historical record until the 1934 Berne Trial, and has never been translated. Untitled, in 22 unnumbered chapters. Many marks of Ukrainian origin.
    - L: Hippolytus Lutostansky (1904) - A direct quote of K; no revision, but useful chronological evidence. (p. 9)
  - Z: hypothetical redaction after K but before X or Y.
    - X: 27 Protocols, arising out of Z.
      - A1: Anonymous (1905) - Published anonymously by a White Russian government press, and based on K.
      - B: Butmi (1906a) - Based on A1, but cross-contaminated with Y.
    - Y: 24 Protocols, re-edited, but not derived directly from Z -- implying the existence of a Q.
      - A2 Anonymous (1905) - Resembles A1, but with some new material.
      - N Nilus (1905) - Significant re-editing, seemingly using A2 as a basis, but introducing a large amount of material taken from Maurice Joly. Basis of most translations.
        - I: Anonymous [1917]/[1996] - A concise abridgment on N. Attributes the text to Theodor Herzl.
      - B3 Butmi (1906a) - Butmi revises his own text to include material from Y.
      - D Demcenko (1906)
  - R: A much shorter document, sharing a source with K and X but not Y.
    - R1: G. Skalon; Unknown original date [1996] - Published in 1996 by Yuri Begunov, who demonstrated the existence of the R branch through philology, claiming that it dated to the 19th century and proved a "Jewish" origin.
    - R2: N. Mordvinov (1905) - Abridgment using similar sources as R1.
    - R3: Anonymous (1906) - Close copy of R2.
    - R4: Anonymous (1906) - Copy of R2 with additional material.

Michelis was able to get his hands on a rare 1903 edition of the daily newspaper Znamya (Banner). He does not explain where he found this newspaper which does not appear in Russian library catalogs. He writes that the paper published the forgery as an authentic reproduction of a document, under the headline "Programa zavoevanija mira evrejami", which he translates into English as "The Jewish Programme for the Conquest of the World". According to de Michelis, the actual title of the purported authentic document is given to it by the translator. In Russian, the title of the document published by the newspaper is as follows: Protokoly zasedanij "vsemirnogo sojuza franmasonov i sionskix mudrecov." This de Michelis translates into English as "The protocols of the sessions of the 'World Alliance of Freemasons and of the Sages of Zion'".

Michelis' work also may be said to present us with the definitive Russian language edition of the complete restored text. The question remains as to whether or not the alleged original French language edition of the late nineteenth century ever existed. Michelis shows that the "French original" is an extremely shadowy and mysterious document; its existence is supposed by almost everyone, and some claim it is still extant, but very few claim to have actually seen it. Carlo Ginzburg, while acknowledging this, points to extensive circumstantial evidence that there were individuals in France who may have wished to produce such a document and had Joly's source text.

== Publications ==
- L'avanguardia trasversale - Il futurismo tra Italia e Russia, Marsilio ed., Venezia 2009 ISBN 978-88-317-9713-9
- The Non-Existent Manuscript: a Study of the Protocols of the Sages of Zion, Studies in Antisemitism Series. University of Nebraska Press, 2004. ISBN 0-8032-1727-7.
- Cesare G. De Michelis (1944–2004). I giorni e le opere. Lineamenti biografici e scientifici 1944/2004, Voland ed., Roma 2004
- Pasternak, La Nuova Italia, ed. Firenze 1968
- Le illusioni e i simboli (K.M. Fofanov), Marsilio ed., Venezia 1973
- Il futurismo italiano in Russia, De Donato ed., Bari 1973
- Il tredicesimo apostolo, Claudiana ed., Torino 1975
- I nomi dell'Avversario, Meynier ed., Torino 1989
- La Valdesia di Novgorod. «Giudaizzanti» e prima riforma (sec. XV), Claudiana ed., Torino, 1993
- Il manoscritto inesistente. "I Protocolli dei savi di Sion: un apocrifo del XX secolo", Marsilio ed., Venezia 1998 (2ª ed. 2004)
- trad. rus. «Protokoly sionskich mudrecov» nesušestvujuščij manuskript, ili podlog veka, Met-Kovčeg, Minsk-Moscow 2006
- La giudeofobia in Russia, Bollati Boringhieri ed., Torino 2001

== See also ==
- Hadassa Ben-Itto
- Michael Hagemeister
- Protocols of the Elders of Zion
- Velikoe v malom
