= Konrad Heiden =

German American journalist and historian

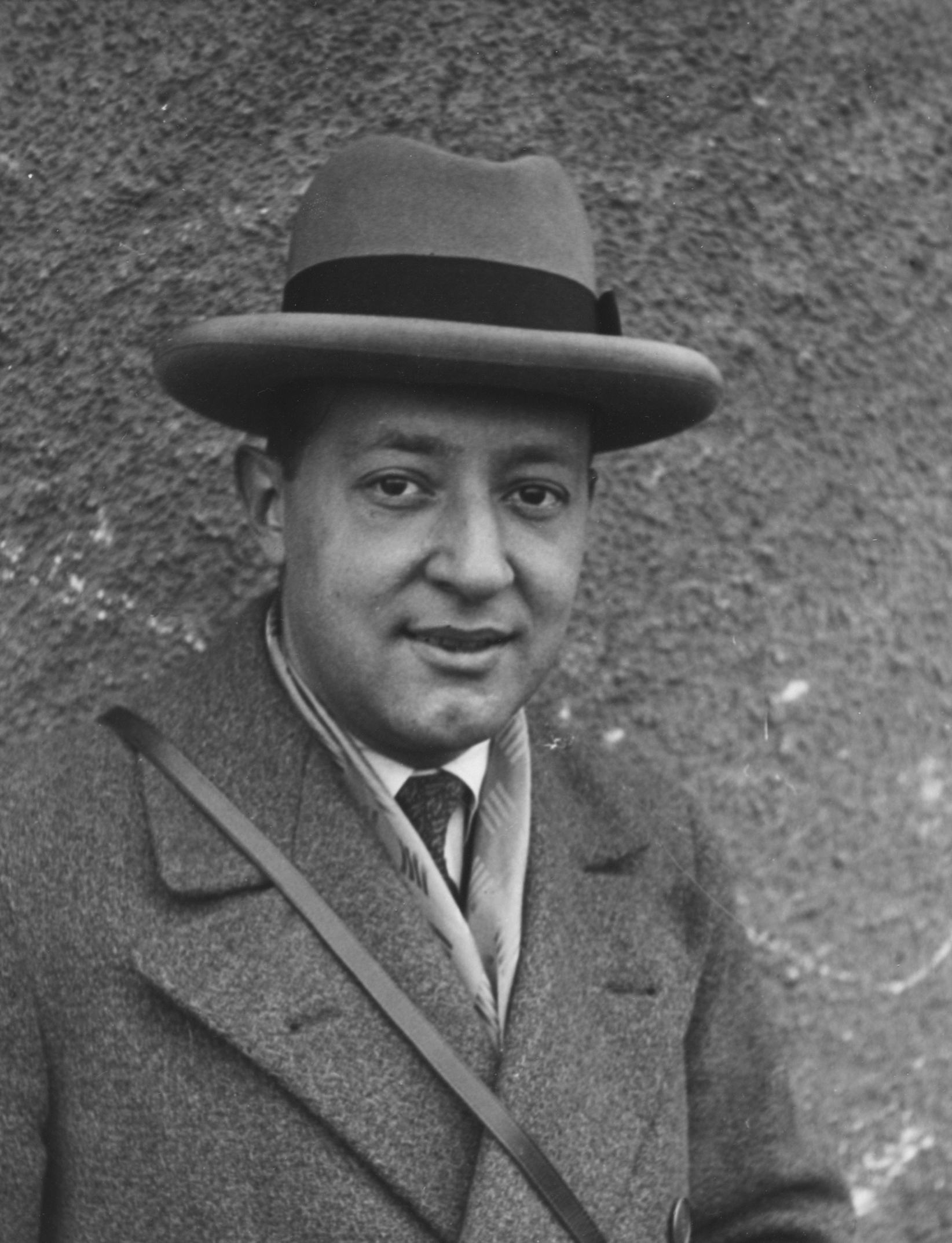
Konrad Heiden

Konrad Heiden (7 August 1901 – 18 June 1966) was a German-American journalist and historian of the Weimar Republic and Nazi eras, most noted for the first influential biographies of Adolf Hitler. Often, he wrote under the pseudonym "Klaus Bredow."

== Life ==
Heiden was born in Munich, Bavaria. He spent his youth in Frankfurt, where his father worked as a union organizer and member of the municipal council, while his mother was a homemaker. His mother was of Jewish origin. Having obtained his high school Abitur, he returned to Munich to study law and economics at the Ludwig-Maximilians-Universität München (LMU). At the university, he organized a republican and democratic student body and, like his father, became a member of the Social Democratic Party (SPD). He graduated in 1923 and began his career as a journalist.

In the political turmoils of the Weimar Republic, Heiden was one of the first critical observers of the rise of Nazism in Germany after he attended a party's meeting in Munich in 1921. He worked for the Frankfurter Zeitung and the Vossische Zeitung, from 1930 as a correspondent in Berlin, but became a freelancer in 1932. In the same year, he published his first book History of National Socialism, released by Rowohlt Verlag with a circulation of 5,000 copies. Upon the Nazi seizure of power in January 1933, he fled into exile; first to the Saar territory, then moved to Zürich in Switzerland from June to December 1933, and again to Saarbrücken where he published two writings on the coming Saar status referendum. After the vote in favour of Nazi Germany in January 1935, he moved to France.

In Zürich, Heiden published his book Birth of the Third Reich in 1934. He, together with other emigrants like Albert Einstein, Heinrich Mann and Thomas Mann struggled for the liberation of Carl von Ossietzky imprisoned at Esterwegen concentration camp and began a campaign for awarding him the 1935 Nobel Peace Prize. Upon his flight to France, he worked as editor in chief of the German-language exile magazine Das Neue Tage-Buch published by Leopold Schwarzschild. In 1937, his German citizenship was withdrawn and his property confiscated.

Upon the outbreak of World War II, Heiden was at first interned by the French authorities. During the German occupation of France in 1940, he managed to escape to the United States via Lisbon with the help of Varian Fry and the International Rescue Committee. He arrived in New York City in late October. In 1944, Heiden published his highly successful biography Der Führer – Hitler's Rise to Power, released by Houghton Mifflin and reprinted by both the US Book of the Month Club and the UK Left Book Club. In the same year, he identified Matvei Golovinski as an author of the Protocols of the Elders of Zion.

After the war, Heiden travelled back to West Germany from December 1951 to May 1952. He published several articles and contributions in Süddeutscher Rundfunk and Radio Bremen broadcasts and continued to write for Life magazine. He finally received US citizenship.

Heiden's last years were affected by deteriorating Parkinson's disease. He died at the Beth Abraham Hospital in New York City on 18 June 1966, having lived in the United States for 26 years after fleeing from Germany.

== Work ==
Heiden's book, The New Inquisition, published jointly by Modern Age Books, Inc. and Alliance Book Corporation, in New York in 1939, with a translation from German by Heinz Norden, includes a series of personal, but necessarily anonymous accounts by German Jews of violent persecution under the Nazi regime accelerating from the time of the fall of 1938 and a prediction of the Final Solution planned by the Nazi regime:

To drive 600,000 people by robbery into hunger, by hunger into desperation, by desperation into wild outbreaks, and by such outbreaks into the waiting knife—such is the coolly calculated plan. Mass murder is the goal, a massacre such as history has not seen—certainly not since Tamerlane and Mithridates. We can only venture guesses as to the technical forms these mass executions are to take.

Heiden's book includes some of the earliest firsthand reports popularly read in the United States from Jews who fell victim to torture and internment at Dachau near Munich, Sachsenhausen or Oranienburg near Berlin, or Buchenwald near Weimar following the mass arrests of 1938.

== Legacy and influence ==
Heiden’s works were amply used and frequently cited by Hannah Arendt in her Origins of Totalitarianism.

== Selected works ==
- History of National Socialism (Berlin, 1932)
- Birth of the Third Reich (Zürich, 1934)
- Hitler: A Biography (Zürich, appeared in two volumes, 1936–1937)
- The New Inquisition (New York City, 1939)
- One Man against Europe (Penguin Books), 1939
- Der Führer – Hitler's Rise to Power (Boston, 1944)

== See also ==
- List of Adolf Hitler books
