= Misbahul Islam Faruqi =

Pakistani writer

Subedar Misbahul Islam Faruqi
- مصباح الاسلام فاروقی
- Born: 18 October 1923; Meerut, British India
- Died: 14 November 1976 (aged 53); Lahore, Pakistan
- Citizenship: British India; Pakistan
- Education: Aligarh Muslim University
- Occupations: writer, editor, translator, journalist, thinker and military officer
- Writing career
- Language: English, Urdu
- Military career
- Allegiance: British Indian Army
- Rank: Subedar
- Conflicts: World War II

Misbahul Islam Faruqi (18 October 1923 – 14 November 1976) was a Pakistani writer, editor, translator, journalist, thinker and military officer in the British Indian Army.

He was born on 18 October 1923, in Meerut. He received BA from Aligarh Muslim University in 1943. He joined the British Indian Army during World War II and was promoted to the rank of Subedar. Subedar Farooqi was fluent in both Urdu and English.

He died on 14 November 1976 in Lahore and was buried there.

== Literary works ==
He was the editor of the Lahore daily Tasneem and Qasid. He was also in charge of the broadcasting department of the Tehreek-e-Islami. He was a regular contributor to Chirag-e-Rah Karachi. His books also translated The Protocols of the Elders of Zion with the title Jewish conspiracy and the Muslim world in the late 1960s and republished in 2001.

- Birth control : its social, political, economic, moral and religious aspects. OCLC 918217732.
- The religion of truth. OCLC 293286.
- Jewish conspiracy and the Muslim world, with complete text of the Protocols of the learned elders of Zion. OCLC 35764.
- Freemasonry; a critical study. OCLC 133696.
- Jewish conspiracy and the Muslim world. OCLC 244786127.
- Introducing Maududi. OCLC 7020670.
- Islam today. OCLC 20040760.
