= Meynier =

Meynier is a surname. Notable people with the surname include:

- André Meynier (1901–1983), French geographer
- Charles Meynier (1763 or 1768–1832), French painter
- Geronimo Meynier (1941–2021), Italian teen film actor
- Jean-Baptiste Meynier (1749–1813), French general
- Octave Meynier (1874–1961), French military officer
