= Vladimir Burtsev =

Russian revolutionary, scholar, journalist, publisher and editor

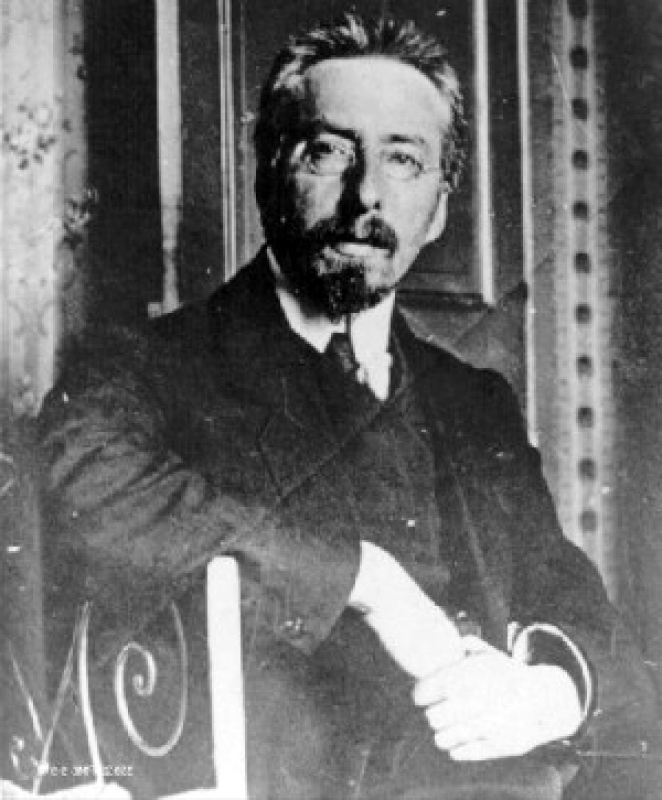
- Born: Vladimir L'vovich Burtsev; November 17, 1862; Fort-Aleksandrovsky, Transcaspian Oblast, Russian Empire
- Died: 21 August 1942 (aged 79); Paris, Nazi-occupied France
- Resting place: Sainte-Geneviève-des-Bois Russian Cemetery
- Occupation(s): Revolutionary activist, scholar, publisher

Vladimir Lvovich Burtsev (Russian: Влади́мир Льво́вич Бу́рцев; November 17, 1862 – August 21, 1942) was a revolutionary activist, scholar, publisher and editor of several Russian language periodicals. He became famous by exposing a great number of agents provocateurs, notably Yevno Azef in 1908. Because of his own revolutionary activities and his harsh criticism of the imperial regime, including personal criticism of emperor Nicholas II, he was imprisoned several times in various European countries. In the course of his life, Burtsev fought oppressive policies from Tsarism in Imperial Russia, followed by the Bolsheviks and later Adolf Hitler's National Socialism.

== Early life (1862–1886) ==
Burtsev was born in Fort-Aleksandrovsky, in the Transcaspian Oblast of the Russian Empire (present-day Kazakhstan) to a military family. In 1882, he was expelled from Saint Petersburg State University and in 1885 from Kazan State University for taking part in student disturbances. As a member of Narodnaya Volya, he was imprisoned for two years (for about a year in the Peter and Paul Fortress) and in 1886 exiled to the Irkutsk region of Eastern Siberia.

== Exile and publications (1888–1914) ==
In 1888 Burtsev managed to escape from exile and emigrate to Switzerland. In 1889 he co-founded magazine Svobodnaya Rossiya (Свободная Россия, A Free Russia) but it survived only three issues. "In 1890 . . . Burtsev, wanted by the czarist police, boarded a British boat bound from Constantinople to London. When the ship found itself surrounded by Turkish police vessels with Russians on board, the captain refused their demand to hand over the fugitive, announcing: “This is English territory. And I am a gentleman!”

In 1898, Burtsev was arrested by British police for advocating, in his magazine Narodovolets (Народоволец, A Member of Narodnaya Volya), the assassination of Nicholas II. Burtsev was found guilty and sentenced to 18 months at hard labour. On his release he went on to publish it in Switzerland, resulting in his permanent ban from that country.

In London, he published the two-volume book Za Sto Let (1800–1896) (За сто лет (1800–1896), For Hundred Years (1800–1896)). He founded and published six issues of Byloye (Былое, The Past), a historical magazine. After the Russian Revolution of 1905 Burtsev briefly returned illegally to Russia and founded the Russian version of the Byloye magazine. Upon his return to the West in 1907, Burtsev began publishing the magazine Obshcheye Delo (Общее дело, Common Cause) which was a continuation of the foreign edition of Byloye beginning with the 7th issue.

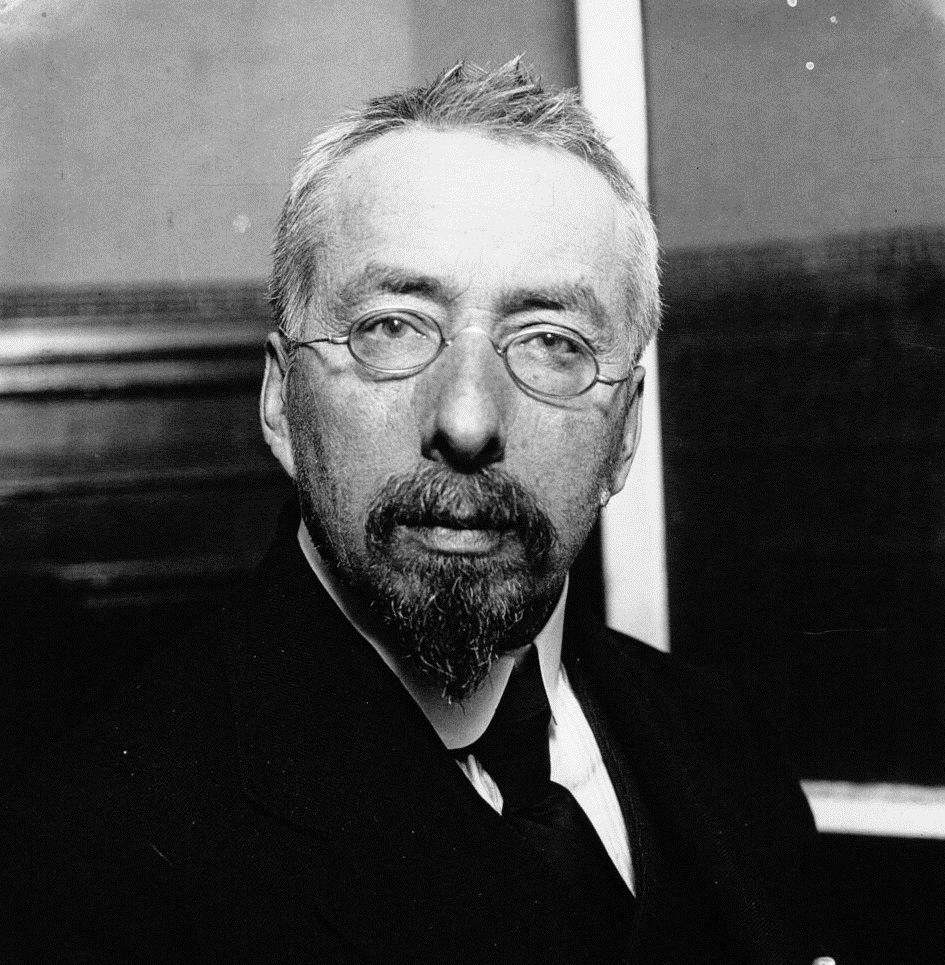
Burtsev in 1913

By exposing numerous Tsarist agent provocateurs such as Yevno Azef, Burtsev gained fame as a counterintelligence expert and became known as "the Sherlock Holmes of the Revolution".

== World War I and the Bolsheviks (1914–1921) ==
At the outset of World War I in 1914 he repatriated, was arrested at the border and again exiled to Siberia. Amnestied in 1915, he returned to Petrograd.

Burtsev strenuously opposed the Bolsheviks. In 1917 he accused Lenin and his comrades of being agents of Germany. In his article Either Us or the Germans and Those with Them (Russian Freedom, July 7, 1917), he listed the major enemies of Russia:

1. Bolsheviks, whose demagoguery puts their own goals above the interests of Russia
2. Reactionary forces
3. German agents and spies. The Bolsheviks are, and always have been, the agents of Wilhelm II.

On the day of the October Revolution, he was arrested on orders of Leon Trotsky, which led some historians to count him as the first political prisoner in the USSR.

Despite their political differences and public disputes in the press, Maxim Gorky pleaded for Burtsev's release and in February 1918 he was indeed freed and left Soviet Russia. Burtsev spent the rest of his life as an emigre, first in Finland, then Sweden and later in France. During the Russian Civil War, he supported the White Movement of Admiral Kolchak and General Anton Denikin.

His numerous attempts to bring all anti-Bolshevik forces together under one ideological umbrella did not succeed.

== Later life and death (1921–1942) ==
In 1921 Burtsev co-founded and became chairman of the Russian National Committee.

Bookcover of Burtsev's The Protocols of the Elders of Zion: A Proven Forgery

In 1930s, Burtsev fought against fascism and antisemitism. In 1934–1935 he was a witness in the Berne Trial, exposing the Okhrana's role in creating the infamous fraud The Protocols of the Elders of Zion. In 1938 in Paris he published a book The Protocols of the Elders of Zion: A Proven Forgery. Burtsev died in poverty in Paris in 1942 from a blood infection and was buried at the Sainte-Geneviève-des-Bois Russian Cemetery.

Burtsev's activities are described in great detail by Yury Davydov in his novel Bestseller.

== Publications ==
- Белый террор при Александре III (White Terror under Alexander III, 1890?)
- Долой царя! - London, 1901 (Down with the tsar!)
- Историко-революционный альманах (Historical-Revolutionary Almanach)
- О войне (About War, 1916)
- Проклятие вам, большевики! Открытое письмо большевикам." (Condemnation on You, Bolsheviks! Open letter, Stockholm, 1918)
- В борьбе с большевиками и немцами. (Fighting with the Bolsheviks and Germans, Paris, 1919. Issue 1 of newspaper "Общее дело" (1917)
- Articles in the newspapers Будущее and Общее дело (1917).
- Борьба за свободную Россию: Из воспоминаний (1882–1924). Vol. I. - Berlin: Гамаюн, 1924. (Struggle for Free Russia. Memoirs)
- Юбилей предателей и убийц (1917–1927). (Jubilee of Traitors and Murderers)
- В погоне за провокаторами. М.-Л., 1928. (Репринт - М., 1989) (In pursuit of provocateurs.)
- В защиту правды. Перестанут ли клеветать? Дело генерала П.П. Дьяконова. Дело полковника А.Н. Попова и полковника И.А. де Роберти. Заговор молчания. - Paris: Общее дело, 1931. (In Defense of the Truth. Will They Stop the Slander? The Case of Gen. Diakonov)
- Боритесь с ГПУ! - Paris: Общее дело, 1932. (Fight the GPU!)
- Браудо Александр Исаевич (1846–1924): Очерки и воспоминания. - Paris. (Braudo Alexander Isayevich)
- Кружок русско-еврейской интеллигенции в Париже, 1937. (one of authors). (Circle of Russian-Jewish Emigration in Paris)
- «Протоколы Сионских мудрецов» - доказанный подлог. - Paris, 1938 (The Protocols of the Elders of Zion: Proven Forgery) (Republished by Слово, 1991).
- Преступления и наказания большевиков. По поводу 20-летнего юбилея предателей и убийц. – Paris: Дом книги, 1938. (Crimes and Punishments of the Bolsheviks. 20 Year Jubilee of Traitors and Murderers)

== Editor and publisher ==
- «Былое» (The Past)
- «Общее дело» (1909–1910) (The Common Cause)
- «Будущее» (1911–1914) (The Future)
- «Общее дело», «Наше общее дело» (1918–1922, 1928–1933) (The Common Cause, Our Common Cause)
- «Борьба за Россию» (1926–1931) (The Struggle for Russia)

== See also ==
- Henryk Baran
- Protocols of Zion
- Berne Trial
