= Richard S. Levy =

American professor of German history

Richard Simon Levy (May 10, 1940 – June 23, 2021) was a professor of Modern German History at the University of Illinois at Chicago from 1971 until his retirement in 2019. He is most noted for his contributions to history in debunking several antisemitic myths, as well as uncovering many others. Levy was featured on a TV documentary concerning The Protocols of the Elders of Zion, A Deadly Deception, which aired on the History Channel on May 11, 1999. Levy died of prostate cancer at his home on June 23, 2021, at the age of 81.

== Works ==
=== Books ===
- The Downfall of the Anti-Semitic Political Parties in Imperial Germany (1975), Yale University Press. ISBN 0-300-01803-7.
- A Lie and a Libel: The History of the Protocols of the Elders of Zion (1995), University of Nebraska Press. ISBN 0-8032-9245-7.

=== Edited books ===
- Antisemitism in the Modern World: An Anthology of Texts (1990), D.C. Heath. ISBN 0-669-24340-X.
- with Albert S. Lindemann, Antisemitism: A history (Oxford UP, 2010).
- Antisemitism: Historical Encyclopedia of Prejudice and Persecution (2 vol. 2005). ABC-Clio. ISBN 1-85109-444-X.

=== Articles ===
- "A Lie and a Libel: The Protocols of the Elders of Zion in Recent History," in L. J. Greenspoon, ed., Representations of Jews Through the Ages (Omaha: Creighton U. Press, 1996), pp. 231–43
- "Continuities and Discontinuities of Anti-Jewish Violence in Modern Germany, 1819–1938," in Christhard Hoffmann, et al., eds., Exclusionary Violence: Antisemitic Riots in Modern German History (University of Michigan Press, 2002), pp. 185–202

=== Book reviews ===
- Alan Steinweis, Art, Ideology, and Economics in Nazi Germany: The Reich Chambers of Music, Theater, and the Visual Arts (Chapel Hill: U. of North Carolina, 1993) in GERMAN STUDIES REVIEW 18 (1995): 176–77
- David Blackbourn, The Long Nineteenth Century: A History of Germany, 1780–1918 (New York: Oxford University Press, 1998), reviewed for H-German, September 9, 1998
- Michael Brenner, The Renaissance of Jewish Culture in Weimar Germany (Yale University Press, 1996) in JOURNAL OF MODERN HISTORY 70 (September 1998): 747-48
- Dirk Walter, Antisemitische Kriminalität und Gewalt: Judenfeindschaft in der Weimarer Republik (Bonn, 1999) in JOURNAL OF MODERN HISTORY 72 (December 2000): 1060–62
- Olaf Blaschke, Katholizismus und Antisemitismus im Deutschen Kaiserreich (Göttingen, 1997) in AMERICAN HISTORICAL REVIEW (February 2001): 278–79
- Till van Rahden, Juden und andere Breslauer. Die Beziehungen zwischen Juden, Protestanten und Katholiken in einer deutschen Grossstadt von 1860 bis 1925 (Göttingen, 2000), Reviewed for H-German, April 21, 2001 (Published in English as Jews and Other Germans: Civil Society, Religious Diversity, and Urban Politics in Breslau, 1860–1925 by University of Wisconsin Press)
- William I. Brustein, Roots of Hate: Anti-Semitism in Europe before the Holocaust (Cambridge, 2003) in CENTRAL EUROPEAN HISTORY 28/3 (2005): 73–74

== Awards and Positions ==
- Humanities Institute Fellow, 1992–93
- Fulbright Summer fellowship, 1996
- Shirley Bill Outstanding Teacher award 1999
- Fulbright Senior Professor Sant'Anna School of University Studies and Doctoral Research, Pisa, Italy for winter semester 2001
- Silver Circle Award 2004
