= The Protocols of the Elders of Zion =

1903 antisemitic text

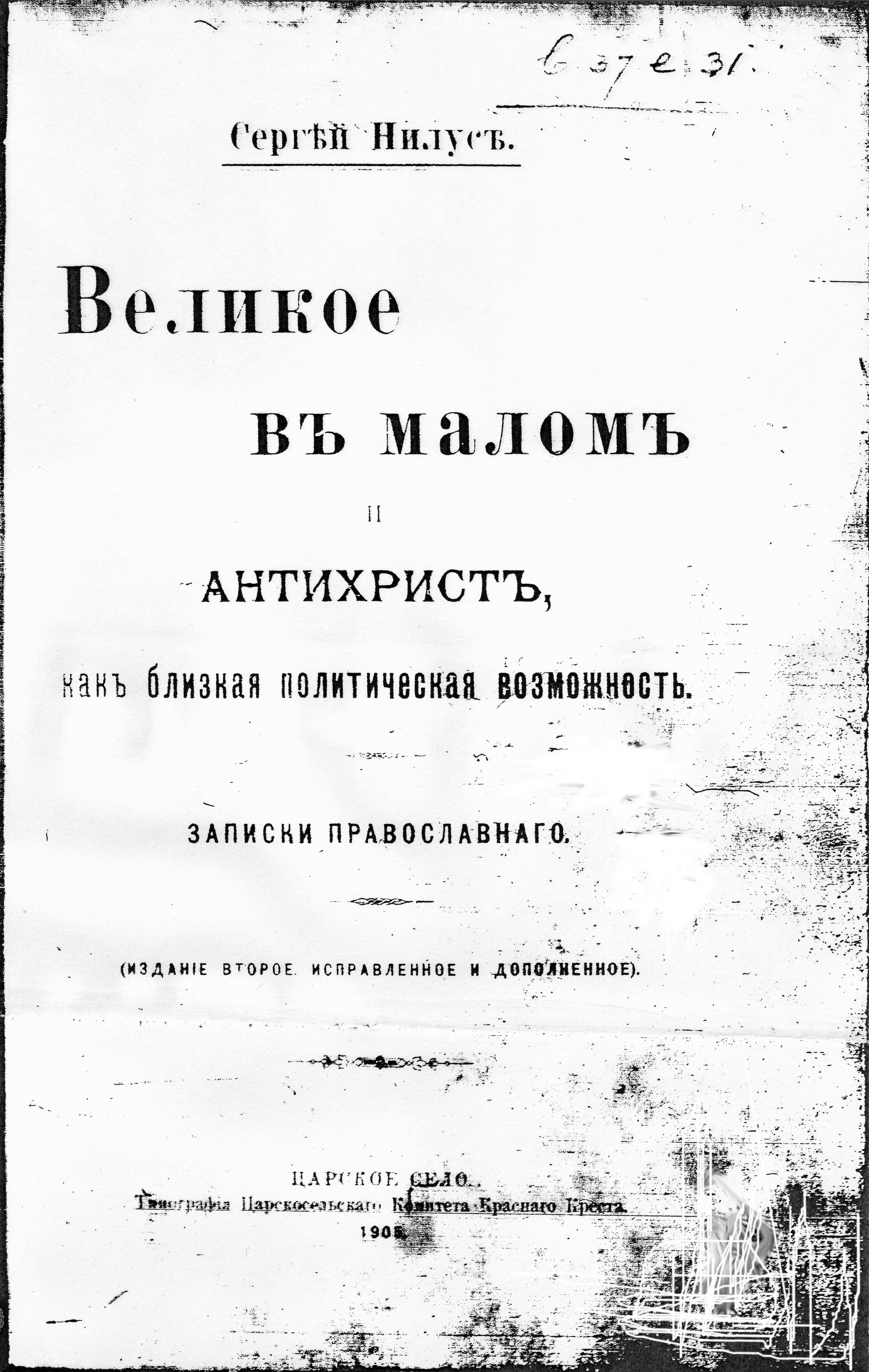
- Cover of the first book edition of The Great Within the Minuscule and Antichrist, in which the Protocols appeared as an appendix
- Author: Unknown
- Original title: Программа завоевания мира евреями
- Language: Russian (Note: With plagiarism from German and French texts)
- Subject: Antisemitic conspiracy theory
- Publisher: Znamya
- Publication date: August–September 1903
- Publication place: Russian Empire
- English publication date: 1919
- Media type: Print: newspaper serialization
- Dewey Decimal: 305.892
- LC Class: DS145.P5

The Protocols of the Elders of Zion (Note: Russian: Протоколы сионских мудрецов, Protokoly Sionskikh Mudretsov.) (Note: Also known as The Protocols of Zion, The Protocols of the Meetings of the Learned Elders of Zion (Протоколы собраний ученых сионских мудрецов, Protokoly Sobraniy Uchenykh Sionskikh Mudretsov) or The Program of Jewish World Conquest (Программа завоевания мира евреями, Programma Zavoyevaniya Mira Yevreyami).) is an antisemitic hoax and forgery purporting to detail a Jewish plot for global domination. Largely plagiarized from several earlier sources, it was first published in Imperial Russia in 1903 (circulating in pamphlets since 1902), translated into multiple languages, and disseminated internationally in the early part of the 20th century. It played a key part in popularizing belief in an international Jewish conspiracy.

The text was exposed as a work of black propaganda by the British newspaper The Times in 1921 and by the German newspaper Frankfurter Zeitung in 1924. Beginning in 1933, distillations of the work were assigned by some German teachers, as if they were factual, to be read by German schoolchildren throughout Nazi Germany. It remains widely available in numerous languages, in print and on the Internet, and continues to be presented by some antisemitic groups as a genuine document. It has been described as "probably the most influential work of antisemitism ever written".

== Creation ==
The Protocols is a fabricated document purporting to be factual. Textual evidence shows that it could not have been produced prior to 1901: the document alludes to the assassinations of Umberto I (d. 1900) and William McKinley (d. 1901), for example, as though these events were plotted out in advance. The title of Sergei Nilus's widely distributed first edition contains the dates "1902–1903", and it is likely that the document was actually written at this time in Russia. Cesare G. De Michelis argues that it was manufactured in the months after a Russian Zionist congress in September 1902, and that it was originally a parody of Jewish idealism meant for internal circulation among antisemites until it was decided to clean it up and publish it as if it were real. Self-contradictions in various testimonies show that the individuals involved—including the text's initial publisher, Pavel Krushevan—deliberately obscured the origins of the text and lied about it in the decades afterwards.

=== Political conspiracy background ===
The forgery is an example of conspiracy theory literature. Towards the end of the 18th century, following the partitions of Poland, the Russian Empire conquered the world's largest Jewish population. The Jews lived in shtetls in the West of the Empire, in the Pale of Settlement, and until the 1840s, local Jewish affairs were organised through the qahal, the semi-autonomous Jewish local government, including for purposes of taxation and conscription into the Imperial Russian Army. Following the ascent of liberalism in Europe and among the intelligentsia in Russia, the Tsarist civil service became more hardline in its reactionary policies, upholding Tsar Nicholas I's slogan of Orthodoxy, Autocracy, and Nationality, whereby non-Orthodox and non-Russian subjects, including Jews, Catholics, and Protestants, were viewed as subversives who needed to be forcibly converted and assimilated; but even Jews like the composer Maximilian Steinberg who attempted to assimilate by converting to Orthodoxy were still regarded with suspicion as potential "infiltrators" supposedly trying to "take over society", while Jews who remained attached to their traditional religion and culture were resented as undesirable aliens.

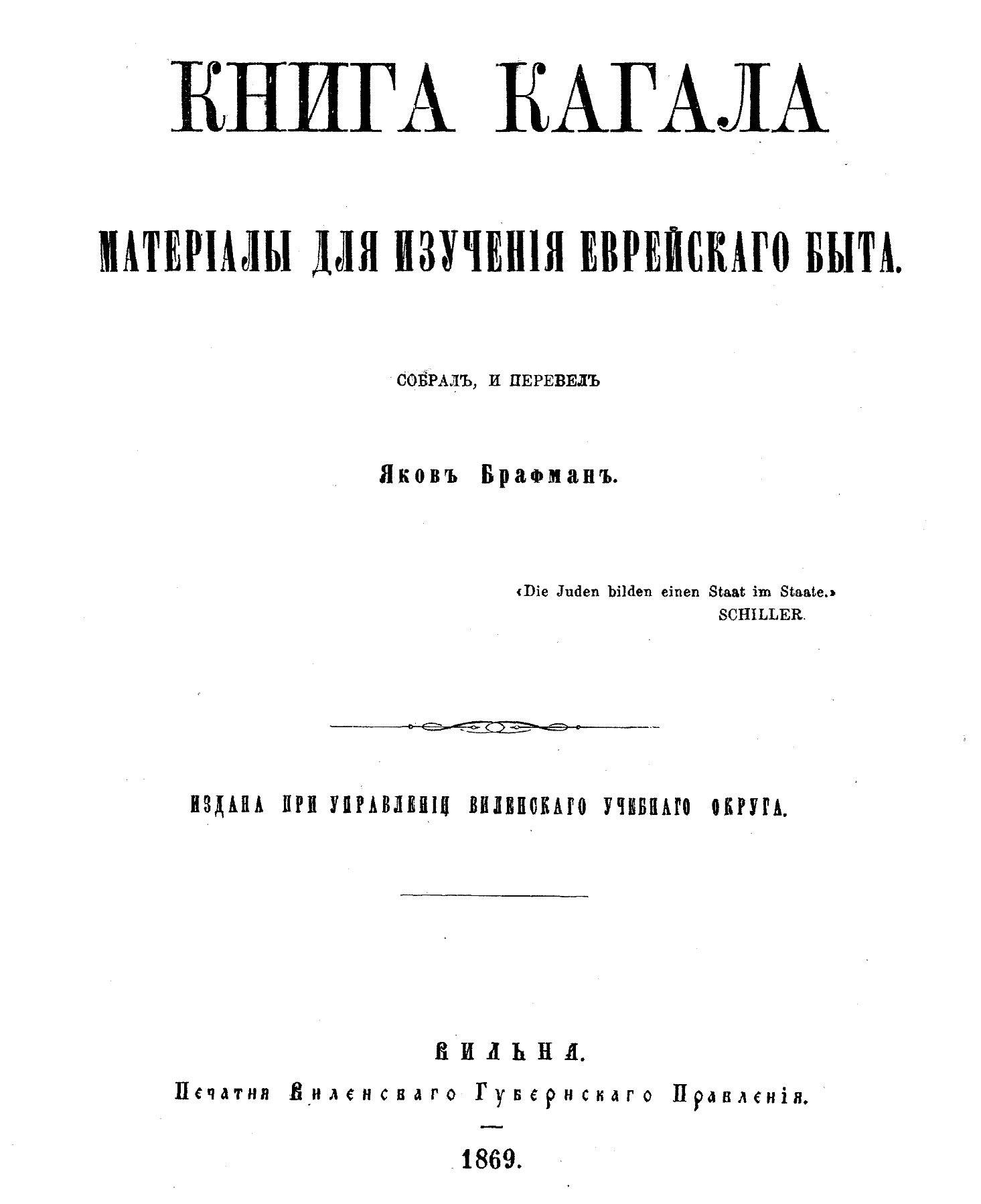
The Book of the Kahal (1869) by Jacob Brafman, in the Russian language original

Resentment towards Jews, for the aforementioned reasons, existed in Russian society, but the idea of a Protocols-esque international Jewish conspiracy for world domination was minted in the 1860s. Jacob Brafman, a Lithuanian Jew from Minsk, had a falling out with agents of the local qahal and consequently converted to the Russian Orthodox Church and authored polemics against the Talmud and the qahal. Brafman claimed in his books The Local and Universal Jewish Brotherhoods (1868) and The Book of the Kahal (1869), published in Vilna, that the qahal continued to exist in secret and that its principal aim was undermining Orthodox Christian entrepreneurs, taking over their property and ultimately seizing political power. He also claimed that it was an international conspiratorial network, under the central control of the Alliance Israélite Universelle, which was based in Paris and then under the leadership of Adolphe Crémieux, a prominent freemason. The Vilna Talmudist, Jacob Barit, attempted to refute Brafman's claim.

The impact of Brafman's work took on an international aspect when it was translated into English, French, German and other languages. The image of the "qahal" as a secret international Jewish shadow government working as a state within a state was picked up by anti-Jewish publications in Russia and was taken seriously by some Russian officials such as P. A. Cherevin and Nikolay Pavlovich Ignatyev who in the 1880s urged governors-general of provinces to seek out the supposed qahal. This was around the time of the assassination of Alexander II of Russia and the subsequent pogroms. In France, it was translated by Monsignor Ernest Jouin in 1925, who later supported the Protocols. In 1928, Siegfried Passarge, a far-right geographer who later gave his support to the Nazis, translated it into German.

Aside from Brafman, there were other early writings which posited a similar concept to the Protocols. This includes The Conquest of the World by the Jews (1873), published in Basel and authored by Osman Bey (born Frederick van Millingen). Millingen was a British subject and son of English physician Julius Michael Millingen, but served as an officer in the army of the Ottoman Empire where he was born. He converted to Islam, but later became a Russian Orthodox Christian. Bey's work was followed up by Hippolytus Lutostansky's The Talmud and the Jews (1879) which claimed that Jews wanted to divide Russia among themselves.

=== Sources employed ===
Source material for the forgery consisted jointly of Dialogue aux enfers entre Machiavel et Montesquieu (Dialogue in Hell Between Machiavelli and Montesquieu), an 1864 political satire by Maurice Joly; and a chapter from Biarritz, an 1868 novel by the antisemitic German novelist Hermann Goedsche, which had been translated into Russian in 1872.

=== Maurice Joly ===
Numerous parts in the Protocols, in one calculation, some 160 passages, were plagiarized from Joly's political satire Dialogue in Hell Between Machiavelli and Montesquieu. This book was a thinly veiled attack on the political ambitions of Napoleon III, who, represented by Machiavelli, plots to rule the world. Joly, a republican who later served in the Paris Commune, was sentenced to 15 months as a direct result of his book's publication. Umberto Eco considered that Dialogue in Hell was itself plagiarised in part from a novel by Eugène Sue, Les Mystères du Peuple (1849–56).

Identifiable phrases from Joly constitute 4% of the first half of the first edition, and 12% of the second half; later editions, including most translations, have longer quotes from Joly.

The Protocols 1–19 closely follow the order of Maurice Joly's Dialogues 1–17. For example:

Dialogue in Hell Between Machiavelli and Montesquieu	The Protocols of the Elders of Zion
How are loans made? By the issue of bonds entailing on the Government the obligation to pay interest proportionate to the capital it has been paid. Thus, if a loan is at 5%, the State, after 20 years, has paid out a sum equal to the borrowed capital. When 40 years have expired it has paid double, after 60 years triple: yet it remains debtor for the entire capital sum. — Montesquieu, Dialogues, p. 209	A loan is an issue of Government paper which entails an obligation to pay interest amounting to a percentage of the total sum of the borrowed money. If a loan is at 5%, then in 20 years the Government would have unnecessarily paid out a sum equal to that of the loan in order to cover the percentage. In 40 years it will have paid twice; and in 60 thrice that amount, but the loan will still remain as an unpaid debt. — Protocols, p. 77
Like the god Vishnu, my press will have a hundred arms, and these arms will give their hands to all the different shades of opinion throughout the country. — Machiavelli, Dialogues, p. 141	These newspapers, like the Indian god Vishnu, will be possessed of hundreds of hands, each of which will be feeling the pulse of varying public opinion. — Protocols, p. 43
Now I understand the figure of the god Vishnu; you have a hundred arms like the Indian idol, and each of your fingers touches a spring. — Montesquieu, Dialogues, p. 207	Our Government will resemble the Hindu god Vishnu. Each of our hundred hands will hold one spring of the social machinery of State. — Protocols, p. 65

Philip Graves brought this plagiarism to light in a series of articles in The Times in 1921, being the first to expose the Protocols as a forgery to the public.

=== Hermann Goedsche ===
Hermann Goedsche was a spy for the Prussian Secret Police who was fired from his job as a postal clerk for helping to forge evidence against the democratic leader Benedict Waldeck in 1849. Following his dismissal, Goedsche began a career as a conservative columnist, and wrote literary fiction under the pen name Sir John Retcliffe. His 1868 novel Biarritz (To Sedan) contains a chapter called "The Jewish Cemetery in Prague and the Council of Representatives of the Twelve Tribes of Israel." In it, Goedsche (who was unaware that only two of the original twelve Biblical tribes remained) depicts a clandestine nocturnal meeting of members of a mysterious rabbinical cabal that is planning a diabolical "Jewish conspiracy." At midnight, the Devil appears to contribute his opinions and insight. The chapter closely resembles a scene in Alexandre Dumas' Giuseppe Balsamo (1848), in which Joseph Balsamo a.k.a. Alessandro Cagliostro and company plot the Affair of the Diamond Necklace.

In 1872, a Russian translation of "The Jewish Cemetery in Prague" appeared in Saint Petersburg as a separate pamphlet of purported non-fiction. François Bournand, in his Les Juifs et nos Contemporains (1896), reproduced the soliloquy at the end of the chapter, in which the character Levit expresses as factual the wish that Jews be "kings of the world in 100 years"—crediting a "Chief Rabbi John Readcliff." Perpetuation of the myth of the authenticity of Goedsche's story, in particular the "Rabbi's speech", facilitated later accounts of the equally mythical authenticity of the Protocols. Like the Protocols, many asserted that the fictional "rabbi's speech" had a ring of authenticity, regardless of its origin: "This speech was published in our time, eighteen years ago," read an 1898 report in La Croix, "and all the events occurring before our eyes were anticipated in it with truly frightening accuracy."

Fictional events in Joly's Dialogue aux enfers entre Machiavel et Montesquieu, which appeared four years before Biarritz, may well have been the inspiration for Goedsche's fictional midnight meeting, and details of the outcome of the supposed plot. Goedsche's chapter may have been an outright plagiarism of Joly, Dumas père, or both. (Note: This complex relationship was originally exposed by Graves 1921. The exposé has since been elaborated in many sources.)

== Structure and content ==
The Protocols purports to document the minutes of a late-19th-century meeting attended by world Jewish leaders, the "Elders of Zion", who are conspiring to control the world. The forgery places in the mouths of the Jewish leaders a variety of plans, most of which derive from older antisemitic canards. For example, the Protocols includes plans to subvert the morals of the non-Jewish world, plans for Jewish bankers to control the world's economies, plans for Jewish control of the press, and – ultimately – plans for the destruction of civilization. The document consists of 24 "protocols", which have been analyzed by Steven Jacobs and Mark Weitzman, who documented several recurrent themes that appear repeatedly in the 24 protocols, (Note: Jacobs analyses the Marsden English translation. Some other less common imprints have more or less than 24 protocols.) as shown in the following table:

Protocol	Title	Themes
1	The Basic Doctrine: "Right Lies in Might"	Freedom and Liberty; Authority and power; Gold equals money
2	Economic War and Disorganization Lead to International Government	International Political economic conspiracy; Press/Media as tools
3	Methods of Conquest	Jewish people, arrogant and corrupt; Chosenness/Election; Public Service
4	The Destruction of Religion by Materialism	Business as Cold and Heartless; Gentiles as slaves
5	Despotism and Modern Progress	Jewish Ethics; Jewish People's Relationship to Larger Society
6	The Acquisition of Land, The Encouragement of Speculation	Ownership of land
7	A Prophecy of Worldwide War	Internal unrest and discord (vs. Court system) leading to war vs Shalom/Peace
8	The transitional Government	Criminal element
9	The All-Embracing Propaganda	Law; education; Freemasonry
10	Abolition of the Constitution; Rise of the Autocracy	Politics; Majority rule; Liberalism; Family
11	The Constitution of Autocracy and Universal Rule	Gentiles; Jewish political involvement; Freemasonry
12	The Kingdom of the Press and Control	Liberty; Press censorship; Publishing
13	Turning Public Thought from Essentials to Non-essentials	Gentiles; Business; Chosenness/Election; Press and censorship; Liberalism
14	The Destruction of Religion as a Prelude to the Rise of the Jewish God	Judaism; God; Gentiles; Liberty; Pornography
15	Utilization of Masonry: Heartless Suppression of Enemies	Gentiles; Freemasonry; Sages of Israel; Political power and authority; King of Israel
16	The Nullification of Education	Education
17	The Fate of Lawyers and the Clergy	Lawyers; Clergy; Christianity and non-Jewish Authorship
18	The Organization of Disorder	Evil; Speech
19	Mutual Understanding Between Ruler and People	Gossip; Martyrdom
20	The Financial Program and Construction	Taxes and Taxation; Loans; Bonds; Usury; Moneylending
21	Domestic Loans and Government Credit	Stock Markets and Stock Exchanges
22	The Beneficence of Jewish Rule	Gold equals Money; Chosenness/Election
23	The Inculcation of Obedience	Obedience to Authority; Slavery; Chosenness/Election
24	The Jewish Ruler	Kingship; Document as Fiction

Hagemeister notes:

the text of the Protocols is completely devoid of the old, traditional accusations against Jews such as deicide, host desecration, well poisoning, ritual murder, blood defilement, fake conversion, or interest taking and usury... [T]he motives and images of modern, racially motivated antisemitism (such as physical inferiority, financial and sexual greed, racial intermixing) are also lacking. The only clearly anti-Jewish motives and defamations found in the Protocols concern the pursuit of world domination, the possession of money and gold, and global networking.

=== Conspiracy references ===
According to Daniel Pipes,

The book's vagueness—almost no names, dates, or issues are specified—has been one key to this wide-ranging success. The purportedly Jewish authorship also helps to make the book more convincing. Its embrace of contradiction—that to advance, Jews use all tools available, including capitalism and communism, philo-Semitism and antisemitism, democracy and tyranny—made it possible for The Protocols to reach out to all: rich and poor, Right and Left, Christian and Muslim, American and Japanese.

Similarly, Michael S. Broschowitz argues that

The lack of names, dates, or any specific references in The Protocols allow it to be used by disparate and contradictory political movements as evidence of international Jewish conspiracy due to the text’s assertion that Jews will use any and all methods at hand, including capitalism and communism, democracy and autocracy, to advance their agenda.

Pipes notes that the Protocols emphasizes recurring themes of conspiratorial antisemitism: "Jews always scheme", "Jews are everywhere", "Jews are behind every institution", "Jews obey a central authority, the shadowy 'Elders'", and "Jews are close to success."

As fiction in the genre of literature, the tract was analyzed by Umberto Eco in his novel Foucault's Pendulum (1988):

The great importance of The Protocols lies in its permitting antisemites to reach beyond their traditional circles and find a large international audience, a process that continues to this day. The forgery poisoned public life wherever it appeared; it was "self-generating; a blueprint that migrated from one conspiracy to another."

Eco also dealt with the Protocols in 1994 in chapter 6, "Fictional Protocols", of his Six Walks in the Fictional Woods and in his 2010 novel The Cemetery of Prague.

== Publication history ==
=== Early publication history ===
The first known mention of The Protocols was in a 1902 article in Saint Petersburg's conservative newspaper Novoye Vremya by journalist Mikhail Osipovich Menshikov. He wrote that a venerable lady of the upper class had suggested he read a small booklet, The Protocols of the Elders of Zion, which denounced "a conspiracy against the world". Menshikov was strongly skeptical of the authenticity of The Protocols, dismissing its authors and spreaders as "people with brain fever". In 1903, The Protocols was published as a series of articles in Znamya, a Black Hundreds newspaper owned by Pavel Krushevan. It appeared again in 1905 as the final chapter (Chapter XII) of the second edition of Velikoe v malom i antikhrist ("The Great Within the Minuscule and Antichrist"), a book by Sergei Nilus. In 1906, it appeared in pamphlet form edited by Georgy Butmi de Katzman.

These first Russian language imprints were used as a tool for scapegoating Jews, blamed by the monarchists for the defeat in the Russo-Japanese War and the Revolution of 1905. Common to all the texts is the idea that Jews aim for world domination. Since The Protocols are presented as merely a document, the front matter and back matter are needed to explain its alleged origin. The diverse imprints, however, are mutually inconsistent. The general claim is that the document was stolen from a secret Jewish organization. Since the alleged original stolen manuscript does not exist, one is forced to restore a purported original edition. This has been done by the Italian scholar, Cesare G. De Michelis in 1998, in a work which was translated into English and published in 2004, where he treats his subject as apocrypha.

In 2020, the Russian historian Ljubov’ Vladimirovna Ul’Janova-Bibikova found a typescript version of The Protocols in the manuscripts collections of the Moscow Central Library. The copy included manuscript additions of terms and corrections found in the 1906 version edited by Georgy Butmi. The handwriting is similar to other manuscripts written by Butmi. This typescript copy confirms that the Protocols were written at least in part in Russia, and were not completely written or translated in France. Cesare G. De Michelis has signalled the importance of the discovery of this typescript.

As the Russian Revolution unfolded, causing White movement–affiliated Russians to flee to the West, this text was carried along and assumed a new purpose. Until then, The Protocols had remained obscure; it now became an instrument for blaming Jews for the Russian Revolution. It became a tool, a political weapon, used against the Bolsheviks who were depicted as overwhelmingly Jewish, allegedly executing the "plan" embodied in The Protocols. The purpose was to discredit the October Revolution, prevent the West from recognizing the Soviet Union, and bring about the downfall of Vladimir Lenin's regime.

=== First Russian language editions ===
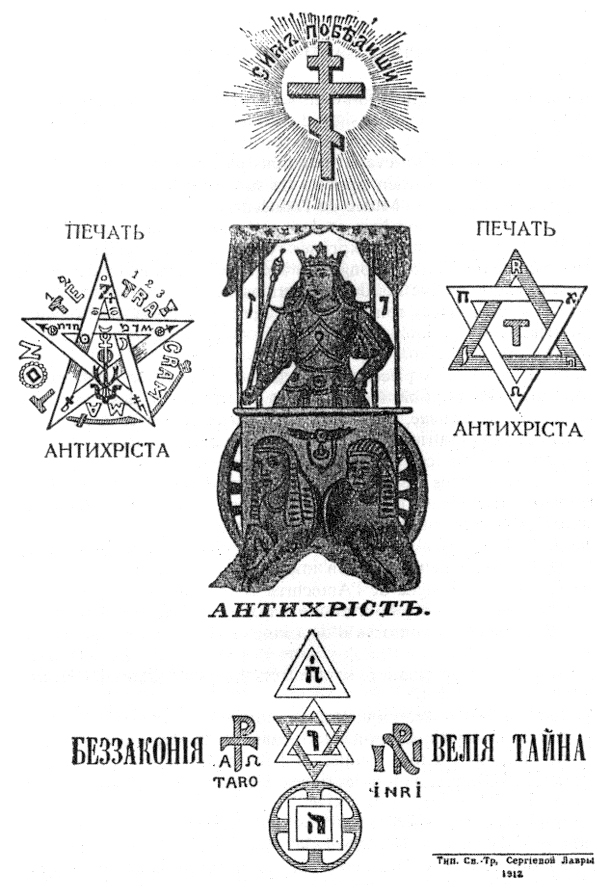
The frontispiece of a 1912 edition using occult symbols

The chapter "In the Jewish Cemetery in Prague" from Goedsche's Biarritz, with its strong antisemitic theme containing the alleged rabbinical plot against the European civilization, was translated into Russian as a separate pamphlet in 1872. However, in 1921, Princess Catherine Radziwill gave a private lecture in New York in which she claimed that the Protocols were a forgery compiled in 1904–05 by Russian journalists Matvei Golovinski and Manasevich-Manuilov at the direction of Pyotr Rachkovsky, Chief of the Russian secret service in Paris.

In 1944, German writer Konrad Heiden identified Golovinski as an author of the Protocols. Radziwill's account was supported by Russian historian Mikhail Lepekhine, whose claims were published in November 1999 in the French newsweekly L'Express. Lepekhine considers the Protocols a part of a scheme to persuade Tsar Nicholas II that the modernization of Russia was really a Jewish plot to control the world. Ukrainian scholar Vadim Skuratovsky offers extensive literary, historical and linguistic analysis of the original text of the Protocols and traces the influences of Fyodor Dostoyevsky's prose (in particular, The Grand Inquisitor and The Possessed) on Golovinski's writings, including the Protocols.

Golovinski's role in the writing of the Protocols is disputed by Cesare G. De Michelis, Michael Hagemeister, and Richard Levy, who each write that the account which involves him is historically unverifiable and to a large extent provably wrong.

In his book The Non-Existent Manuscript, Italian scholar Cesare G. De Michelis studies early Russian publications of the Protocols. The Protocols were first mentioned in the Russian press in April 1902, by the Saint Petersburg newspaper Novoye Vremya (Новое Время – The New Times). The article was written by famous conservative publicist Mikhail Menshikov as a part of his regular series "Letters to Neighbors" ("Письма к ближним") and was titled "Plots against Humanity". The author described his meeting with a lady (Yuliana Glinka, as it is known now) who, after telling him about her mystical revelations, implored him to get familiar with the documents later known as the Protocols; but after reading some excerpts, Menshikov became quite skeptical about their origin and did not publish them.

==== Krushevan and Nilus editions ====
The Protocols were published at the earliest, in serialized form, from August 28 to September 7 (O.S.) 1903, in Znamya, a Saint Petersburg daily newspaper, under Pavel Krushevan. Krushevan had initiated the Kishinev pogrom four months earlier.

In 1905, Sergei Nilus published the full text of the Protocols in Chapter XII, the final chapter (pp. 305–417), of the second edition (or third, according to some sources) of his book, Velikoe v malom i antikhrist, which translates as "The Great within the Small and the Antichrist". He claimed it was the work of the First Zionist Congress, held in 1897 in Basel, Switzerland. When it was pointed out that the First Zionist Congress had been open to the public and was attended by many non-Jews, Nilus changed his story, saying the Protocols were the work of the 1902–03 meetings of the Elders, but contradicting his own prior statement that he had received his copy in 1901:

In 1901, I succeeded through an acquaintance of mine (the late Court Marshal Alexei Nikolayevich Sukotin of Chernigov) in getting a manuscript that exposed with unusual perfection and clarity the course and development of the secret Jewish Freemasonic conspiracy, which would bring this wicked world to its inevitable end. The person who gave me this manuscript guaranteed it to be a faithful translation of the original documents that were stolen by a woman from one of the highest and most influential leaders of the Freemasons at a secret meeting somewhere in France—the beloved nest of Freemasonic conspiracy.

==== Stolypin's fraud investigation, 1905 ====
A subsequent secret investigation ordered by Pyotr Stolypin, the newly appointed chairman of the Council of Ministers, came to the conclusion that the Protocols first appeared in Paris in antisemitic circles around 1897–98. When Nicholas II learned of the results of this investigation, he requested, "The Protocols should be confiscated, a good cause cannot be defended by dirty means." Despite the order, or because of the "good cause", numerous reprints proliferated. Nicholas later read the Protocols to his family during their imprisonment.

=== The Protocols in the West ===
Title page of 1920 edition from Boston

In January 1920, Eyre & Spottiswoode published the first English translation of The Protocols of the Elders of Zion in Britain. According to a letter written by art historian Robert Hobart Cust, the pamphlet had been translated, prepared, and paid for by George Shanks and their mutual friend, Major Edward Griffiths George Burdon, who was serving as Secretary of the United Russia Societies Association at that time. In an edition of Lord Alfred Douglas’ Plain English journal dated January 1921, it is claimed that Shanks, a former officer in the Royal Navy Air Service and the Russian Government Committee in Kingsway, London, had found post-war employment in the Chief Whip's Office at 12 Downing Street, before being offered a position as Personal Secretary to Sir Philip Sassoon, at that time serving as Private Secretary to British Prime Minister David Lloyd George in Britain's Coalition Government.

In the United States, The Protocols are to be understood in the context of the First Red Scare (1917–20). The text was purportedly brought to the United States by a Russian Army officer in 1917; it was translated into English by Natalie de Bogory (personal assistant of Harris A. Houghton, an officer of the Department of War) in June 1918, and Russian expatriate Boris Brasol soon circulated it in American government circles, specifically diplomatic and military, in typescript form, a copy of which is archived by the Hoover Institute.

On October 27 and 28, 1919, the Philadelphia Public Ledger published excerpts of an English language translation as the "Red Bible," deleting all references to the purported Jewish authorship and re-casting the document as a Bolshevik manifesto. The author of the articles was the paper's correspondent at the time, Carl W. Ackerman, who later became the head of the journalism department at Columbia University.

Having fled Ukraine in 1918–19, Piotr Shabelsky-Bork brought the Protocols to Ludwig Müller von Hausen who then published them in German. Under the pseudonym Gottfried zur Beek he produced the first and "by far the most important" German translation. It appeared in January 1920 as a part of a larger antisemitic tract dated 1919. After The Times discussed the book respectfully in May 1920 it became a bestseller. Alfred Rosenberg's 1923 analysis "gave a forgery a huge boost".

In 1923, there appeared an anonymously edited pamphlet by the Britons Publishing Society, a successor to The Britons, an entity created and headed by Henry Hamilton Beamish. This imprint was allegedly a translation by Victor E. Marsden, who had died in October 1920.

==== Britain and the exposure of a forgery ====
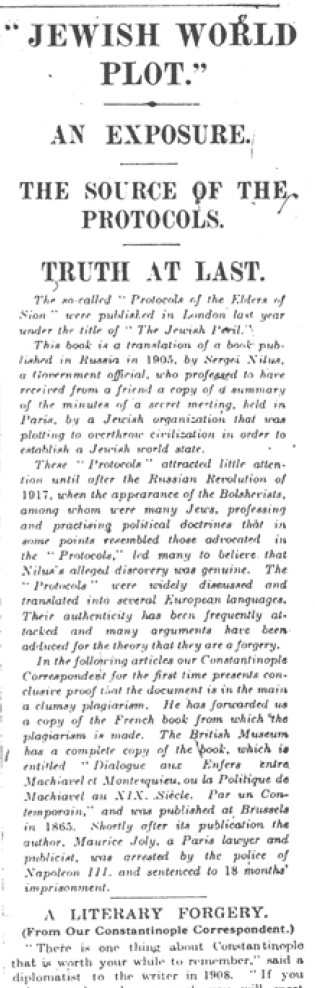
The Times exposed the Protocols as a forgery on August 16–18, 1921.

On May 8, 1920, an article in The Times followed German translation and appealed for an inquiry into what it called an "uncanny note of prophecy". In the leader (editorial) titled "The Jewish Peril, a Disturbing Pamphlet: Call for Inquiry", Wickham Steed wrote about The Protocols:

What are these 'Protocols'? Are they authentic? If so, what malevolent assembly concocted these plans and gloated over their exposition? Are they forgery? If so, whence comes the uncanny note of prophecy, prophecy in part fulfilled, in part so far gone in the way of fulfillment?

Steed retracted his endorsement of The Protocols after they were exposed as a forgery.

In 1920–1921, the history of the concepts found in the Protocols was traced back to the works of Goedsche and Jacques Crétineau-Joly by Lucien Wolf (an English Jewish journalist), and published in London in August 1921. Then an exposé occurred in the series of articles in The Times by its Constantinople reporter, Philip Graves, who discovered the plagiarism from the work of Maurice Joly.

In 1921, while at the US Embassy in Istanbul, Allen Dulles, who later became the first civilian US Director of Central Intelligence, helped expose The Protocols of the Elders of Zion as a forgery. Dulles unsuccessfully attempted to persuade the US State Department to publicly denounce the forgery.

According to writer Peter Grose, Allen Dulles, who was in Constantinople developing relationships in post-Ottoman political structures, discovered "the source" of the documentation and ultimately provided him to The Times. Grose writes that The Times extended a loan to the source, a Russian émigré who refused to be identified, with the understanding the loan would not be repaid. Colin Holmes, a lecturer in economic history at Sheffield University, identified the émigré as Mikhail Raslovlev, a self-identified antisemite, who gave the information to Graves so as not to "give a weapon of any kind to the Jews, whose friend I have never been."

In the first article of Graves' series, titled "A Literary Forgery", the editors of The Times wrote, "our Constantinople Correspondent presents for the first time conclusive proof that the document is in the main a clumsy plagiarism. He has forwarded us a copy of the French book [The Dialogue in Hell Between Machiavelli and Montesquieu] from which the plagiarism is made." In the same year, an entire book documenting the hoax was published in the United States by Herman Bernstein. Despite this widespread and extensive debunking, the Protocols continued to be regarded as important factual evidence by antisemites.

==== United States and Henry Ford ====
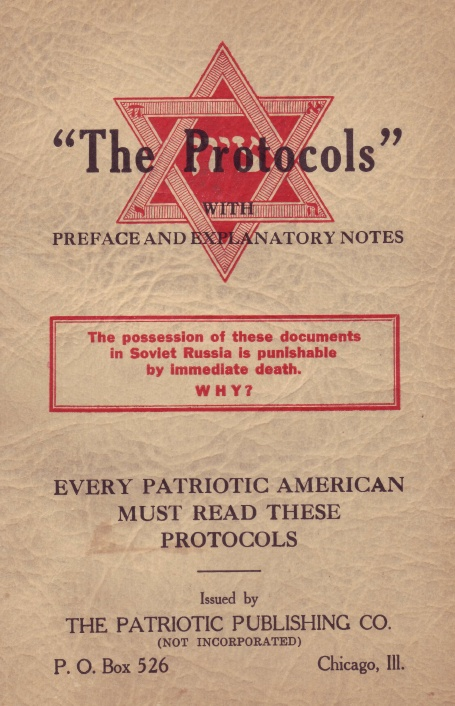
A 1934 edition by the Patriotic Publishing Company of Chicago

For nearly two years starting in 1920, the American industrialist Henry Ford published in a newspaper he owned—The Dearborn Independent—a series of antisemitic articles that quoted liberally from the Protocols. The actual author of the articles is generally believed to have been the newspaper's editor William J. Cameron. During 1922, the circulation of the Dearborn Independent grew to almost 270,000 paid copies. Ford later published a compilation of the articles in book form as "The International Jew: The World's Foremost Problem". In 1921, Ford cited evidence of a Jewish threat: "The only statement I care to make about the Protocols is that they fit in with what is going on. They are 16 years old, and they have fitted the world situation up to this time." Robert A. Rosenbaum wrote that "In 1927, bowing to legal and economic pressure, Ford issued a retraction and apology—while disclaiming personal responsibility—for the anti-Semitic articles and closed the Dearborn Independent". Ford was an admirer of Nazi Germany.

In 1934, an anonymous editor expanded the compilation with "Text and Commentary" (pp 136–141). The production of this uncredited compilation was a 300-page book, an inauthentic expanded edition of the twelfth chapter of Nilus's 1905 book on the coming of the anti-Christ. It consists of substantial liftings of excerpts of articles from Ford's antisemitic periodical The Dearborn Independent. This 1934 text circulates most widely in the English-speaking world, as well as on the internet. The "Text and Commentary" concludes with a comment on Chaim Weizmann's October 6, 1920, remark at a banquet: "A beneficent protection which God has instituted in the life of the Jew is that He has dispersed him all over the world". Marsden, who was dead by then, is credited with the following assertion:

It proves that the Learned Elders exist. It proves that Dr. Weizmann knows all about them. It proves that the desire for a "National Home" in Palestine is only camouflage and an infinitesimal part of the Jew's real object. It proves that the Jews of the world have no intention of settling in Palestine or any separate country, and that their annual prayer that they may all meet "Next Year in Jerusalem" is merely a piece of their characteristic make-believe. It also demonstrates that the Jews are now a world menace, and that the Aryan races will have to domicile them permanently out of Europe.

=== Italy ===
Fascist politician Giovanni Preziosi published the first Italian edition of the Protocols in 1921. The book however had little impact until the mid-1930s. A new 1937 edition had a much higher impact, and three further editions in the following months sold 60,000 copies total. The fifth edition had an introduction by Julius Evola, which argued around the issue of forgery, stating: "The problem of the authenticity of this document is secondary and has to be replaced by the much more serious and essential problem of its truthfulness".

==== Switzerland ====
===== Berne Trial, 1934–35 =====
The selling of the Protocols (edited by German antisemite Theodor Fritsch) by the National Front during a political meeting in the Casino of Bern on June 13, 1933, (Note: The main speaker was the former chief of the Swiss General Staff Emil Sonderegger.) led to the Berne Trial in the Amtsgericht (district court) of Bern, the capital of Switzerland, on October 29, 1934. The plaintiffs (the Swiss Jewish Association and the Jewish Community of Bern) were represented by Hans Matti and Georges Brunschvig, helped by Emil Raas. Working on behalf of the defense was German antisemitic propagandist Ulrich Fleischhauer. On May 19, 1935, two defendants (Theodore Fischer and Silvio Schnell) were convicted of violating a Bernese statute prohibiting the distribution of "immoral, obscene or brutalizing" texts while three other defendants were acquitted. The court declared the Protocols to be forgeries, plagiarisms, and obscene literature. Judge Walter Meyer, a Christian who had not previously heard of the Protocols, said in conclusion,

I hope the time will come when nobody will be able to understand how in 1935 nearly a dozen sane and responsible men were able for two weeks to mock the intellect of the Bern court discussing the authenticity of the so-called Protocols, the very Protocols that, harmful as they have been and will be, are nothing but laughable nonsense.

Vladimir Burtsev, a Russian émigré, anti-Bolshevik and anti-Fascist who exposed numerous Okhrana agents provocateurs in the early 1900s, served as a witness at the Berne Trial. In 1938 in Paris he published a book, The Protocols of the Elders of Zion: A Proved Forgery, based on his testimony.

On November 1, 1937, the defendants appealed the verdict to the Obergericht (Cantonal Supreme Court) of Bern. A panel of three judges acquitted them, holding that the Protocols, while false, did not violate the statute at issue because they were "political publications" and not "immoral (obscene) publications (Schundliteratur)" in the strict sense of the law. The presiding judge's opinion stated, though, that the forgery of the Protocols was not questionable and expressed regret that the law did not provide adequate protection for Jews from this sort of literature. The court refused to impose the fees of defense of the acquitted defendants to the plaintiffs, and the acquitted Theodor Fischer had to pay 100 Fr. to the total state costs of the trial (Fr. 28,000) that were eventually paid by the canton of Bern. This decision gave grounds for later allegations that the appeal court "confirmed authenticity of the Protocols" which is contrary to the facts.

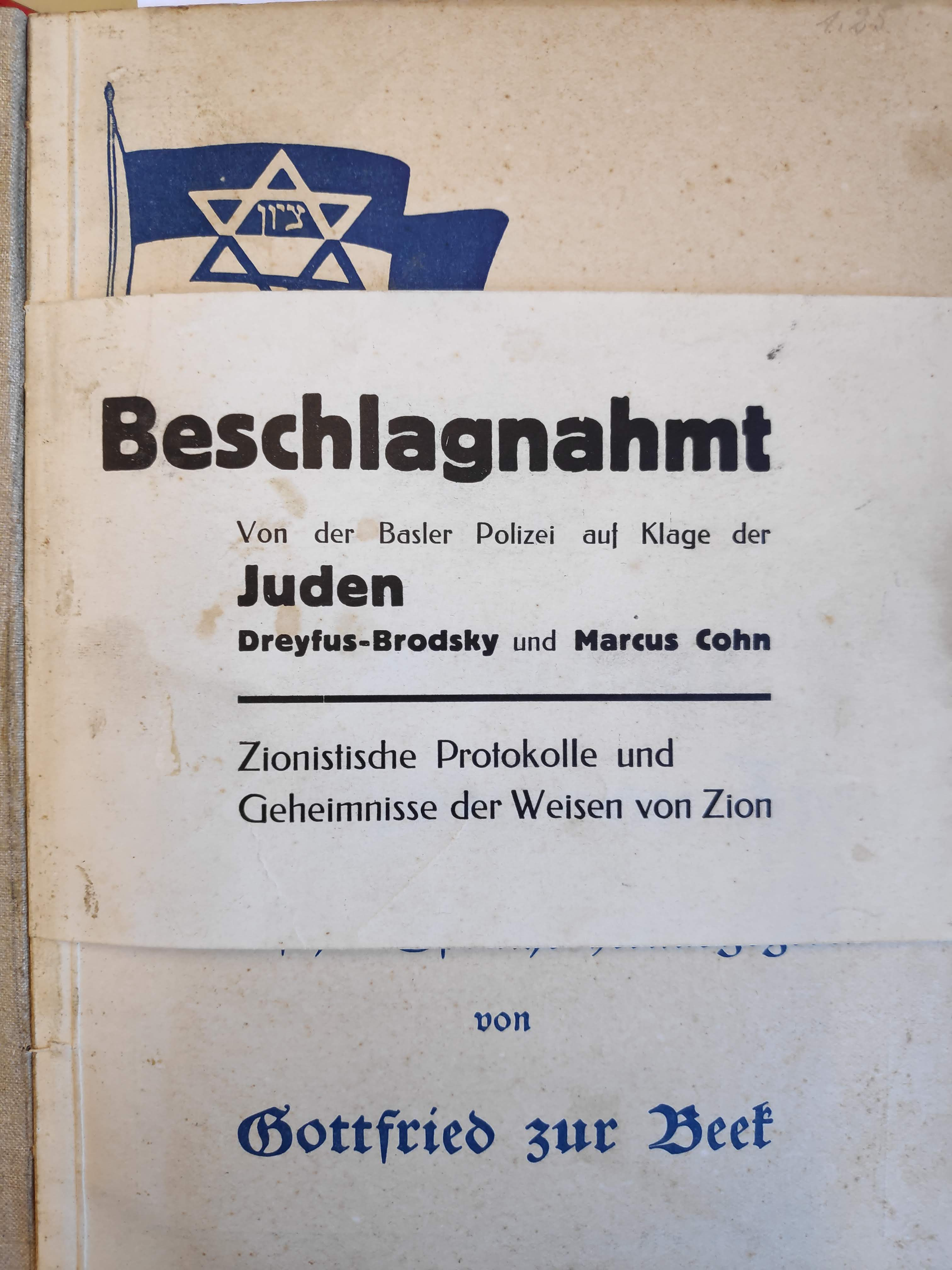
Protocols of Zion, confiscated by the Basel police on complaint of the Jews Dreyfus-Brodsky and Marcus Cohn, 1933, in the collection of the Jewish Museum of Switzerland

Evidence presented at the trial, which strongly influenced later accounts up to the present, was that the Protocols were originally written in French by agents of the Tzarist secret police (the Okhrana). However, this version has been questioned by several modern scholars. Michael Hagemeister discovered that the primary witness Alexandre du Chayla had previously written in support of the blood libel, had received four thousand Swiss francs for his testimony, and was secretly doubted even by the plaintiffs. Charles Ruud and Sergei Stepanov concluded that there is no substantial evidence of Okhrana involvement and strong circumstantial evidence against it.

===== Basel Trial =====
A similar trial in Switzerland took place in Basel. The Swiss Frontists Alfred Zander and Eduard Rüegsegger distributed the Protocols (edited by the German Gottfried zur Beek) in Switzerland. Jules Dreyfus-Brodsky and Marcus Cohen sued them for insult to Jewish honour. At the same time, chief rabbi Marcus Ehrenpreis of Stockholm (who also witnessed at the Berne Trial) sued Alfred Zander who contended that Ehrenpreis himself had said that the Protocols were authentic (referring to the foreword of the edition of the Protocols by the German antisemite Theodor Fritsch). On June 5, 1936, these proceedings ended with a settlement. (Note: Zander had to withdraw his contention and the stock of the incriminated Protocols were destroyed by order of the court. Zander had to pay the fees of this Basel Trial.)

=== Finland ===
The first Finnish edition of the Protocols was published in Swedish in 1919. In 1920, the Protocols were published in Finnish as "The Jewish Secret Program“. Four additional editions of the Swedish edition were quickly published, and the Finnish edition was re-released in 1933 under the title "The Scourge of Nations“.

Another edition of the Protocols was published by the Nazi group Blue Cross in 1943. The Party of Finnish Labor also published their edition of the Protocols translated by party secretary Taavi Vanhanen.

The State Police had copies of the Protocols in its libraries available to those wishing to read them, along with other antisemitic books, until it was reorganized into Red (pro-Communist) State Police post-Second World War. It is unknown if the Protocols were officially considered legitimate, but the chief of the State Police Ossi Holmström subscribed to the Judeo-Bolshevik conspiracy theory.

=== Nazi Germany ===
According to historian Norman Cohn, the assassins of German Jewish politician Walther Rathenau (1867–1922) were convinced that Rathenau was a literal "Elder of Zion".

It seems likely Adolf Hitler first became aware of the Protocols after hearing about it from ethnic German white émigrés, such as Alfred Rosenberg and Max Erwin von Scheubner-Richter. Rosenberg and Scheubner-Richter were also members of the early Aufbau Vereinigung counterrevolutionary group, which according to historian Michael Kellogg, influenced the Nazis in promulgating a Protocols-like myth.

Hitler refers to the Protocols in Mein Kampf:

... [The Protocols] are based on a forgery, the Frankfurter Zeitung moans [ ] every week ... [which is] the best proof that they are authentic ... the important thing is that with positively terrifying certainty they reveal the nature and activity of the Jewish people and expose their inner contexts as well as their ultimate final aims.

The Protocols also became a part of the Nazi propaganda effort to justify persecution of the Jews. In The Holocaust: The Destruction of European Jewry 1933–1945, Nora Levin states that "Hitler used the Protocols as a manual in his war to exterminate the Jews":

Despite conclusive proof that the Protocols were a gross forgery, they had sensational popularity and large sales in the 1920s and 1930s. They were translated into every language of Europe and sold widely in Arab lands, the US, and England. But it was in Germany after World War I that they had their greatest success. There they were used to explain all of the disasters that had befallen the country: the defeat in the war, the hunger, the destructive inflation.

Hitler did not mention the Protocols in his speeches after his defense of it in Mein Kampf. "Distillations of the text appeared in German classrooms, indoctrinated the Hitler Youth, and invaded the USSR along with German soldiers." Nazi Propaganda Minister Joseph Goebbels proclaimed: "The Zionist Protocols are as up-to-date today as they were the day they were first published."

Richard S. Levy criticizes the claim that the Protocols had a large effect on Hitler's thinking, writing that it is based mostly on suspect testimony and lacks hard evidence. Randall Bytwerk agrees, writing that most leading Nazis did not believe it was genuine despite having an "inner truth" suitable for propaganda.

Publication of the Protocols was stopped in Germany in 1939 for unknown reasons. An edition that was ready for printing was blocked by censorship laws.

== Post–World War II usage ==
=== Middle East ===
Neither governments nor political leaders in most parts of the world have referred to the Protocols since World War II. The exception to this is the Middle East, where several regimes and leaders have endorsed them as authentic, including endorsements from Presidents Gamal Abdel Nasser and Anwar Sadat of Egypt, President Abdul Salam Arif of Iraq, King Faisal of Saudi Arabia, and Colonel Muammar al-Gaddafi of Libya. A translation made by an Arab Christian appeared in Cairo in 1927 or 1928, this time as a book. The first translation by an Arab Muslim was also published in Cairo, but only in 1951.

The Protocols circulated in the Middle East in the early years of the Cold War, and have exerted influence on literature. Between 1965 and 1967 alone, approximately 50 Arabic-language books on political subjects were either based on the Protocols or quoted from them.

The 1988 charter of Hamas stated that the Protocols embodied the "plan of the Zionists;" The reference was removed in the new covenant issued in 2017. In 2005, it was reported that the Palestinian Authority was referring to the Protocols in a textbook for 10th grade students; after media exposure, the PA issued a revised edition of the textbook that does not include references to the Protocols.

Recent endorsements in the 21st century have been made by the Grand Mufti of Jerusalem, Sheikh Ekrima Sa'id Sabri, and the education ministry of Saudi Arabia. In 2001–2002, Arab Radio and Television produced a 30-part television miniseries entitled Horseman Without a Horse, starring prominent Egyptian actor Mohamed Sobhi, which contains dramatizations of the Protocols. The United States and Israel criticized Egypt for airing the program. Ash-Shatat (Arabic: الشتات The Diaspora) is a 29-part Syrian television series produced in 2003 by a private Syrian film company and was based in part on the Protocols. Syrian national television declined to air the program. Ash-Shatat was shown on Lebanon's Al-Manar, before being dropped. The series was shown in Iran in 2004, and in Jordan during October 2005 on Al-Mamnou, a Jordanian satellite network.

Former Grand Mufti of Egypt, Ali Gomaa, asserted that the Protocols was a forgery, having made an official court complaint concerning a publisher who falsely put his name on an introduction to its Arabic translation.

==== Iran ====
The first Iranian edition of the Protocols was issued during the summer of 1978 before the Iranian Revolution, after which the Protocols were widely publicized by the Iranian government. A publication called Imam, published by the Iranian embassy in London, quoted extensively from the Protocols in its issues of 1984 and 1985. In 1985, a new edition of the Protocols was printed and widely distributed by the Islamic Propagation Organization. Parts of the Protocols were published by the daily Jomhouri-e Eslami in 1994, under the heading The Smell of Blood, Zionist Schemes. Sobh, a far right monthly newspaper, published excerpts from the Protocols under the heading The text of the Protocols of the Elders of Zion for establishing the Jewish global rule in its December 1998 – January 1999 issue, illustrated with a caricature of the Jewish snake swallowing the globe.

Iranian writer and researcher Ali Baqeri, who researched the Protocols, claimed that the Protocols were merely part of an even more grandiose scheme, saying in Sobh in 1999:

"The ultimate goal of the Jews ... after conquering the globe ... is to extract from the hands of the Lord many stars and galaxies".

In April 2004, the Iranian television station Al-Alam broadcast Al-Sameri wa Al-Saher, a series that reported as fact several conspiracy theories about the Holocaust, Jewish control of Hollywood, and the Protocols. The Iran Pavilion of the 2005 Frankfurt Book Fair had the Protocols, as well as The International Jew available. In 2008 The Secret of Armageddon, an Iranian TV program claiming that "a Jewish Plan for the Genocide of Humanity," included a conspiracy for the takeover of Iran by local Jewish and Baháʼí Faith communities was based on the Protocols.

=== East Asia ===
Masami Uno's book If You Understand Judea You Can Comprehend the World: 1990 Scenario for the 'Final Economic War' became popular in Japan around 1987 and was based upon the Protocols.

Jewish Conspiracy and the Muslim World, published in Malaysia in 1991, includes the complete text of the Protocols along with new conspiracy theory material authored by Malaysian Misbahul Islam Faruqi, who claims that the Protocols explains the threat posed to the Muslim world from Israel, India and other world powers.

=== Africa ===
The Palestinian Solidarity Committee of South Africa distributed copies of the Protocols at the World Conference against Racism 2001. The book was sold during the conference in an exhibition tent set up for the distribution of antiracist literature.

=== Europe ===
==== Finland ====
Pekka Siitoin's Patriotic Popular Front published a new edition in the 1970s. In the 2000s, the Protocols were published by the Magneettimedia. In the 2020s, the Protocols have been republished by a pseudonymous individual suspected of being a researcher at the University of Helsinki according to Demokraatti.

==== Greece ====
In 2012, the Protocols were read aloud in the Greek Parliament by one of its members, Ilias Kasidiaris, of the neo-Nazi party Golden Dawn.

==== Italy ====
In 2010, an Italian editor was convicted on charges of libel for publishing the Protocols. He had been sued by the Jewish community of Turin. The conviction was later overturned by the Italian Supreme Court of Cessation.

==== Russia ====
Despite stipulations against fomenting hatred based on ethnic or religious grounds (Article 282 of Russia Penal Code), the Protocols have enjoyed numerous reprints in the nationalist press after the dissolution of the Soviet Union.

As recently as 2005, the Protocols was "a frequent feature in Patriarchate churches". On January 27, 2006, members of the Public Chamber of Russia and human rights activists proposed to establish a list of extremist literature whose dissemination should be formally banned for uses other than scientific research.

By the decision of the Leninsky City District Court of Orenburg dated 26 July 2010, the Protocols of the Elders of Zion was considered an extremist publication. However, the court did not ban the work itself as such, but the pamphlet. According to the national standard of the Russian Federation (ГОСТ 7.60-2003), a pamphlet means a book publication with a volume of more than 4, but not more than 48 pages.

In March 2011, the Russian human rights movement 'For Human Rights' and member of the Civic Chamber of the Russian Federation Alla Gerber appealed to the prosecutor's office of the Northern Administrative Okrug of Moscow with a demand to stop the distribution of the Protocols. The prosecutor's office rejected the demand stating that the Institute of Psychology of the Russian Academy of Sciences conducted a psycholinguistic and socio-psychological examination of the texts. According to conclusions of the experts, Protocols has a critical historical-educational and political-educational focus and that "there is no information in the book that encourages action against other nationalities, social and religious groups or individuals as its representatives."

In April 2011, the Ministry of Foreign Affairs of Russia placed an order for the supply of sets of spiritual and moral literature to Russian diplomatic missions, which included the books The Great within the Small and Antichrist by Sergei Nilus, the Protocols and other antisemitic publications, which resulted in public outcry. In May 2011, Evgeny Velikhov, head of the Civic Chamber of the Russian Federation, wrote a letter to Prosecutor-General of Russia Yury Chaika, demanding the labelling of the Protocols as extremist, in order to get it banned from publication.

In November 2012, the Protocols was added to the Federal List of Extremist Materials under the entry number 1496 by the decision of the Leninsky City District Court of Orenburg.

=== United States ===
The Protocols were republished as fact in 1991 in Milton William Cooper's conspiracy book Behold a Pale Horse, though Cooper primarily targets the Illuminati at the center of his conspiracy theory. In 2011, Christian writer and conspiracy theorist Texe Marrs published an edition of the Protocols, with a foreword of his own authorship and additional notes by Henry Ford. The Protocols have also been distributed in the United States by the Nation of Islam.

The American retail chain Walmart was criticized for selling The Protocols of the Elders of Zion on its website with a description that suggested it might be genuine. It was withdrawn from sale in September 2004, as 'a business decision'.

=== Contemporary conspiracy theories ===
The Protocols continue to be widely available around the world, in multiple formats, including print, the Internet, and social media, and remain influential in contemporary conspiracy literature. The work is widely considered influential in the development of other conspiracy theories, with its themes repeatedly adapted into new ideological contexts.

Notions derived from the Protocols frequently reappear in modern conspiratorial narratives, including claims that the "Jews" depicted in the Protocols are a cover for groups such as the Illuminati, Freemasons, the Priory of Sion or, according to David Icke, "extra-dimensional entities" and/or "Rothschild Zionists" or a "Sabbatean-Frankist Death Cult”. In his book And the truth shall set you free (1995), Icke asserted that the Protocols are genuine and accurate. Similarities have been noticed between the Protocols and the Eurabia conspiracy theory. Scholars have documented that these structural themes continue to influence contemporary conspiracy narratives and online disinformation, which became significantly prevalent during the COVID-19 pandemic, where longstanding tropes about hidden global control were repurposed.

== See also ==
=== Pertinent concepts ===
- Black propaganda
- Cultural Marxism conspiracy theory
- Disinformation
- Hate speech
- Jewish Bolshevism
- Pseudohistory
- Shadow government (conspiracy)
- World government
- Zionist Occupation Government conspiracy theory

=== Individuals ===
- Martin Heidegger and Nazism

=== Related or similar texts ===
- Alta Vendita
- The Cohen Plan
- Hamas Covenant
- Memoirs of Mr. Hempher, The British Spy to the Middle East
- Our Race Will Rule Undisputed Over The World
- The Prague Cemetery
- A Protocol of 1919
- Protocols of Zion (film)
- A Racial Program for the Twentieth Century
- Tanaka Memorial
- Warrant for Genocide

== Sources ==
- Bernstein, Herman (1921): The History of a Lie at Project Gutenberg
  - Bernstein, Herman (1921). The history of a lie, 'The protocols of the wise men of Zion' (page images) (study). Archive.
- Bronner, Stephen Eric (2000). A Rumor About the Jews: Reflections on Antisemitism and the Protocols of the Learned Elders of Zion. New York: St. Martin's Press. ISBN 9780312218041.
- Bronner, Stephen Eric (2019). A Rumor About the Jews: Conspiracy, Antisemitism, and The Protocols of the Learned Elders of Zion (2nd ed.). Palgrave Macmillan. ISBN 9783030070274.
- Carroll, Robert Todd (2006). "Protocols of the Learned Elders of Zion". The Skeptic's Dictionary.
- Chanes, Jerome A (2004). Antisemitism: a reference handbook. ABC-Clio.
- Cohn, Norman (1967). Warrant for Genocide, The myth of the Jewish world conspiracy and the 'Protocols of the Elders of Zion'. Eyre & Spottiswoode. ISBN 978-1-897959-25-1.
- De Michelis, Cesare G. (2004). The Non-Existent Manuscript: A Study of the Protocols of the Sages of Zion. University of Nebraska Press. ISBN 978-0-8032-1727-0.
- Graves, Philip (August 16–18, 1921). "The Truth about the Protocols: A Literary Forgery". The Times. London. Archived from the original on August 9, 2003.
- Graves, Philip (September 4, 1921b). "'Jewish World Plot': An Exposure. The Source of 'The Protocols of Zion'. Truth at Last" (PDF). The New York Times. Front p, Sec 7. Archived from the original (PDF) on March 4, 2006.
  - Graves, Philip (1921c). The truth about 'The Protocols': a literary forgery (articles collection). London: The Times. Archived from the original (pamphlet) on May 10, 2013.
- Hagemeister, Michael (2006). Brinks, Jan Herman; Rock, Stella; Timms, Edward (eds.). Nationalist Myths and Modern Media. Contested Identities in the Age of Globalization. London/New York: Bloomsbury. pp. 243–255.
- Hagemeister, Michael (2008). "The Protocols of the Elders of Zion: Between History and Fiction". New German Critique. 35 (103): 83–95. doi:10.1215/0094033X-2007-020. JSTOR 27669221.
- Hagemeister, Michael (2011). "The Protocols of the Elders of Zion in court: The Bern trials, 1933–1937". In Webman, Esther (ed.). The Global Impact of 'The Protocols of the Elders of Zion'. London, New York: Routledge. pp. 241–253.
- Hagemeister, Michael (2022). The Perennial Conspiracy Theory — Reflections on the History of The Protocols of the Elders of Zion. Routledge. ISBN 978-1-032-06015-6.
- Jacobs, Steven Leonard; Weitzman, Mark (2003). Dismantling the Big Lie: The Protocols of the Elders of Zion. KTAV Publishing House. ISBN 978-0-88125-785-4.
- Kellogg, Michael (2005). The Russian Roots of Nazism White Émigrés and the Making of National Socialism, 1917–1945. Cambridge University Press.
- Klier, John Doyle (2005). Imperial Russia's Jewish Question, 1855–1881. Cambridge University Press. ISBN 978-0521023818.
- Laqueur, Walter (2001). The Holocaust Encyclopedia. New Haven: Yale University Press. ISBN 0-300-08432-3.
- Lüthi, Urs (1992). Der Mythos von der Weltverschwörung: die Hetze der Schweizer Frontisten gegen Juden und Freimaurer, am Beispiel des Berner Prozesses um die 'Protokolle der Weisen von Zion' (in German). Basel/Frankfurt am Main: Helbing & Lichtenhahn. ISBN 978-3-7190-1197-0. OCLC 30002662.
- Petrovsky-Shtern, Yohanan (2011). "The enemy of humanity: The Protocols paradigm in nineteenth-century Russian Mentality". In Webman, Esther (ed.). The Global Impact of The Protocols of the Elders of Zion. A century-old myth. London & New York: Routledge. ISBN 978-0-415-59892-7.
- Pipes, Daniel (1997). Conspiracy: How the Paranoid Style Flourishes and Where It Comes From. The Free Press, Simon & Schuster. ISBN 978-0-684-83131-2.
- Pisanty, Valentina (2006). La difesa della razza: antologia 1938-1943 (in Italian). Tascabili Bompiani. ISBN 9788845214196.
- Ruud, Charles; Stepanov, Sergei (1999). "10. Protocols, Masons and Liberals". The Tsar's Secret Police. McGill-Queen's University Press.
- Shibuya, Eric (2007). "The Struggle with Violent Right-Wing Extremist Groups in the United States". In Forest, James (ed.). Countering terrorism and insurgency in the 21st century. Greenwood.
- Singerman, Robert (1980). "The American Career of the Protocols of the Elders of Zion". American Jewish History. 71.
