= Berne Trial =

1933–35 trial about the "Protocols of the Elders of Zion"

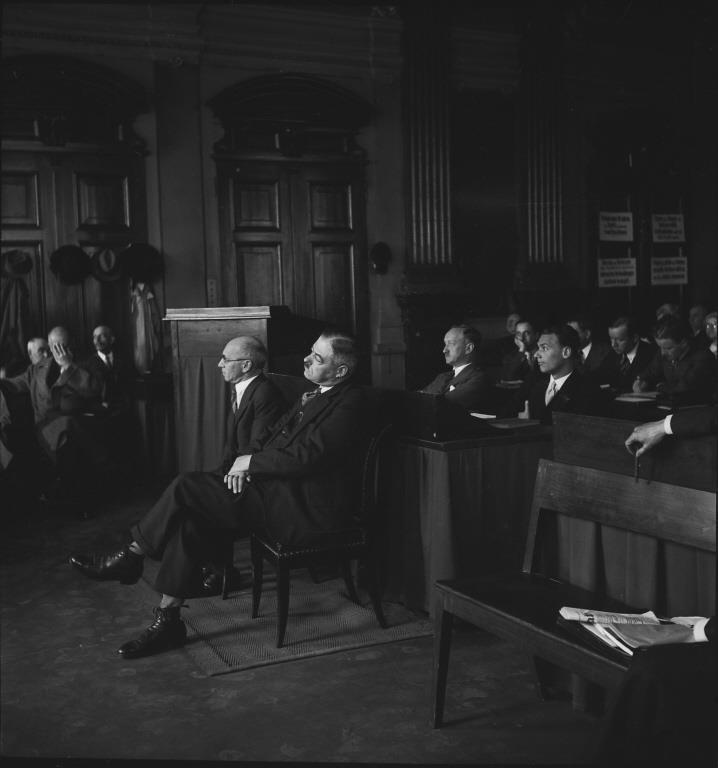
The Bern Trial

The Berne Trial or Bern Trial (German: Zionistenprozess) was a famous court case in Bern, Switzerland which took place between 1933 and 1935. Two organisations, the Swiss Federation of Jewish Communities (German: Schweizerischer Israelitischer Gemeindebund) and the Bernese Jewish Community (German: Israelitische Kultusgemeinde Bern) sued the far-right Swiss National Front for distributing anti-Jewish propaganda. The trial focused on the Front's use of the fraudulent antisemitic text The Protocols of the Elders of Zion. Ultimately decided in favour of the plaintiffs, the Front was ordered to pay a symbolic fine and court costs. However, the trial became significant both for the international coverage and also for the extensive evidence presented, demonstrating the falsehoods contained in The Protocols.

== Background ==
=== Meeting in Bern's Casino ===
The plaintiffs, the Schweizerischer Israelitischer Gemeindebund (SIG) and the Israelitische Kultusgemeinde Bern, sued the Bund Nationalsozialistischer Eidgenossen (BNSE) (Swiss president: Theodor Fischer at Zurich) which distributed antisemitic pamphlets during a meeting of June 13, 1933 organized by the National Front and the Heimatwehr in the Casino of Bern (with former chief of the Swiss General Staff and Frontist Emil Sonderegger as main speaker). The National Front distributed a print "Die zionistischen Protokolle, 13. Aufl. 1933" edited and introduced by the German antisemitic writer Theodor Fritsch. Silvio Schnell, the young man responsible for distribution of publications of the National Front, was sued because he sold the print during the meeting. Theodor Fischer (BNSE) was sued as author of the pamphlet and editor of the journal Der Eidgenosse (Swiss Confederate) which published an offensive antisemitic article written by Alberto Meyer, Zurich, in the manner of Julius Streicher.

=== "Protocols of the Elders of Zion" ===
Frontist propaganda declared the Protocols of the Elders of Zion as authentic, i.e. as a secret program produced by Jewry in order to gain worldwide political power and control by every possible means (e.g. supporting corrupt politicians, bombing in underground-stations, economic measures etc.). Fritsch claimed in his incriminated edition that the Protocols of the Elders of Zion were produced during the First Zionist Congress at Basel (1897) and cited Rabbi Mordecai Ehrenpreis (1869–1951) from Stockholm Synagogue, who participated at the Basel Congress 1897, in a misleading manner as a pretended proof for Jewish authorship in the foreword of his incriminated print.

== Litigation ==
=== Main Court Session, October 29–31, 1934 ===
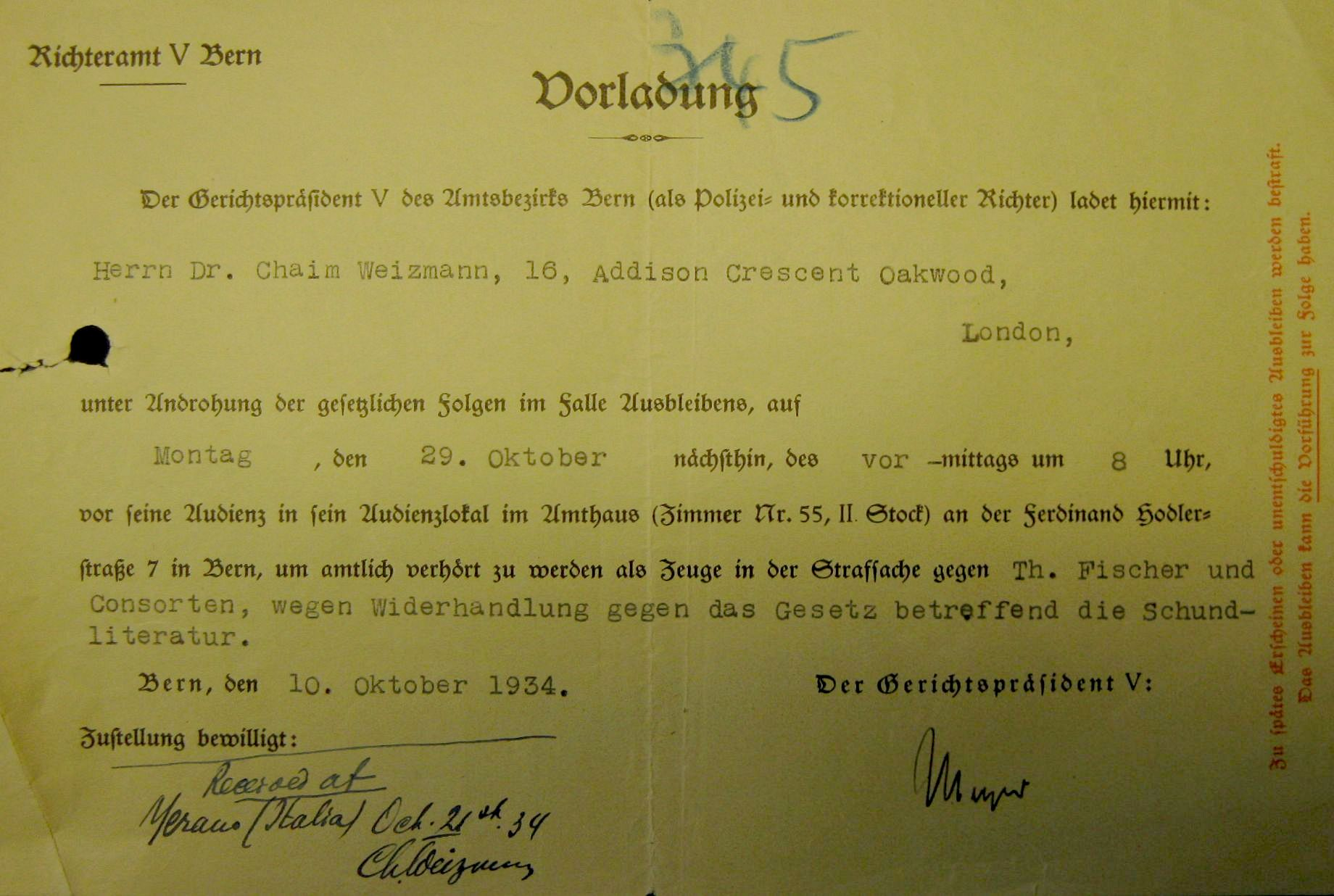
Citation of Dr. Chaim Weizmann to the Berne Trial as witness 1934, State Archive of Bern / Staatsarchiv des Kt. Bern

The trial soon focused on the plagiarism and forgery of the notorious Protocols of the Elders of Zion. In the Main Session of 1934 witnesses were cited: Participants of the First Zionist Congress at Basel (1897), among them Rabbi M. Ehrenpreis; then several Russian witnesses living in exile (mainly at Paris) to tell the judge about a possible Russian origin of the Protocols of the Elders of Zion (as a forgery by the Tsarist police to promote anti-Semitic feelings during the time of Pogroms). The alleged link between Freemasonry and Jews was also a point of interest and masonic witnesses were cited. The plaintiffs nominated these witnesses and paid a considerable amount to the Court to make the appearance of those important eyewitnesses possible, among them also Chaim Weizmann, the future first president of the state of Israel. The only witness nominated by the defendants was Alfred Zander, Zurich, who wrote some articles on the Protocols of the Elders of Zion in the newspaper "Der eiserne Besen" (the iron broom) of the National Front.

==== Witnesses at the Main Session 1934 ====
===== First witness =====
- Chaim Weizmann, London

===== Witnesses about Russia =====
- Count A. M. du Chayla
- Sergei Svatikov
- Vladimir Burtsev
- Boris Nicolaevsky
- H. Sliosberg (a Jewish lawyer in Russia)
- Pavel Milyukov

===== Witnesses who participated in the First Zionist Congress at Basel (1897) =====
- Mayer Ebner, Cernauti/Romania (1872–1955)
- Marcus Ehrenpreis, Stockholm (chief rabbi)
- David Farbstein, Zurich (1868–1953)
- Max Bodenheimer, Amsterdam (1865–1940)
- Franz Sieber (shorthand writer)
- Hermann Dietrich (shorthand writer)
- Otto Zoller (editor at the "Basler Nachrichten 1897)

===== Witnesses about Freemasonry =====
- Theodor Tobler, Bern (founder of well-known Toblerone)
- Eduard Welti, Bern

===== Only witness of the defendants =====
- Alfred Zander (Swiss frontlist who wrote articles in the "Eiserner Besen"/the iron broom)(1905–1997)

===== Witnesses cited, but not appearing before the court =====
- Philip Graves, London (gave written testimony to the judge)
- Armand Aharon Kaminka, Vienna/Jerusalem (cited, but not able to come)
- Alberto Meyer, Zurich (author of the incriminated antiSemite article "Schweizermädchen..." in "Der Eidgenosse")

=== Main Court Session, April 29 – May 13, 1935: Three experts ===
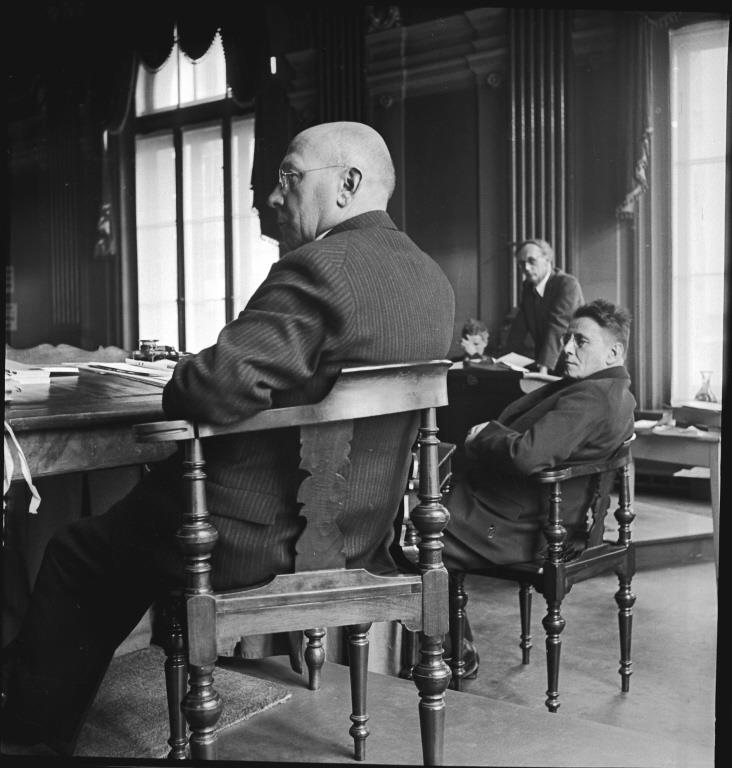
From left: judge Walter Meyer, the experts Carl Albert Loosli (sitting) and Arthur Baumgarten (standing).

In the Main Session 1935 three experts intervened: (1) C. A. Loosli, Bern-Bümpliz (expert appointed by the judge); (2) Arthur Baumgarten, Basel (expert appointed by the plaintiffs); (3) Ulrich Fleischhauer, Erfurt/Germany (anti-Semitic expert appointed by the defendants). The appointed experts had to answer four questions by the judge of the case, Walter Meyer:

1. Was the Protocols of the Elders of Zion a forgery?
2. Was it plagiarized?
3. If it was, what was its source?
4. Do the Protocols fall under the term Schundliteratur?

Further questions to be answered by the experts were formulated by the plaintiffs. During this session no further witnesses were heard.

While the experts Arthur Baumgarten and C. A. Loosli declared the Protocols of the Elders of Zion as a plagiarism and a forgery produced by helpers of the tsarist Russian Okhrana, anti-Semitic expert Ulrich Fleischhauer claimed that they were genuine but of uncertain authorship, possibly composed by the Jewish author Ahad Haam and passed at a secret meeting of B'nai B'rith which purportedly took place in 1897 during the first Zionist Congress at Basel, Switzerland.

=== Decision and appeal ===
Eventually, the defendants Theodor Fischer and Silvio Schnell were sentenced by Judge Walter Meyer in his verdict, while three other defendants were acquitted. The penalty was a quite symbolic fine: Fr. 50 (Fischer) and Fr. 20 (Schnell). However, the defendants found guilty would have to pay a larger sum of the costs of the trial and some of the costs of the plaintiffs. Commenting on his verdict in the court, judge Walter Meyer said he was convinced by his evaluation of the testimonies of the witnesses and the statements of the experts that the Protocols of the Elders of Zion are a forgery and "Schundliteratur" that might instigate crimes by agitation against a minority.

Theodor Fischer himself and the lawyer of Silvio Schnell (Hans Ruef, Bern) immediately appealed to the Berner Obergericht which acquitted both defendants in 1937 on purely formal legal grounds, arguing that the term "Schundliteratur" of the Bernese Law is not applicable to "political publications" but only to "immoral (obscene) publications". The Berner Obergericht refused the obligation of the private plaintiffs to pay the costs of defence of the acquitted defendants explaining that "the one who circulates such sort of most vulgar instigating articles has to pay himself the costs resulting from them." Fischer had to pay Fr. 100 to the state fees of the trial (Fr. 28'000, paid by the Canton of Bern).

== Funding ==
The defendants sought financing from the German Nazi party but were unsatisfied with the support they received. They also received support from multiple anti-Jewish organizations, especially the society Welt-Dienst (World-Service) of Ulrich Fleischhauer, the expert appointed by the defendants. Joseph Goebbels' Ministry of Public Enlightenment and Propaganda initially promised support but later withdrew it. The plaintiffs and their supporting organizations financed a larger part of the costs of the citation of witnesses and of the pay of the experts C. A. Loosli and A. Baumgarten.

== Important archival material, e.g. the so-called Russian Documents transmitted to expert Loosli ==
The various findings of the court, regarding the series of events leading to the publication of the Protocols of the Elders of Zion, are now regarded as a treasure trove of archival material for scholars and historians.

Of special interest are the so-called Russian Documents transmitted to the expert C. A. Loosli with permission of the Soviet government by the librarian Tager in Moscow for personal use only, copies of authentic material from the tsarist administration, especially on the Russian Okhrana and on the Russian Jews. Boris Lifschitz, a Swiss lawyer in Bern of Russian-Jewish origin speaking both Russian and German, had contacts to the Soviet administration and played an important role in procuring the Russian documents and contacting various Russian witnesses to appear at the court in 1934 (who were all opposed to Bolshevism).

== See also ==
- Ulrich Fleischhauer (anti-Semitic expert)
- Maurice Joly
- Masonic conspiracy theories
- Serge Nilus (visited by witness du Chayla in Russia)
- Mikhail Raslovlev (informant of Graves about Joly's book)
- Elias Tcherikower (scholar)
