= Conversion of non-Islamic places of worship into mosques =

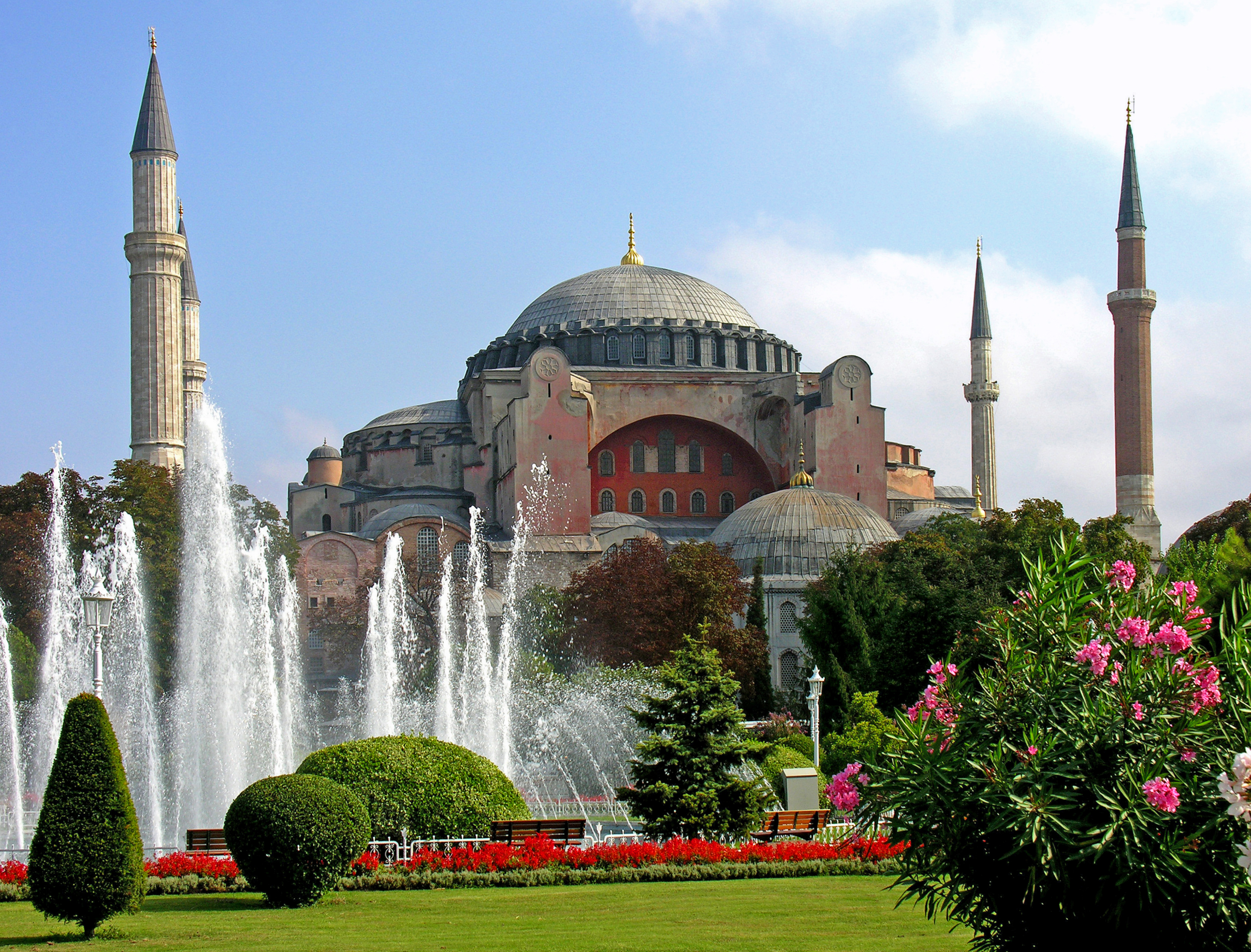
Hagia Sophia, a mosque converted from an Eastern Orthodox cathedral in 1453 CE.

The conversion of non-Islamic places of worship into mosques occurred after the life of Muhammad during subsequent and under historical Muslim rule. Hindu temples, (Note: Muslim historians mention the looting and destruction of temples, as well as conversion of temples into mosques. Some texts also mention periods of tolerance and temple repairs such as those during the rule of Akbar.) Jain temples, churches, synagogues, and Zoroastrian fire temples have been converted into mosques.

Several such mosques in the areas of former Muslim rule have since been reconverted or have become museums, including the Parthenon in Greece and numerous mosques in Spain, such as Mosque–Cathedral of Córdoba. Conversion of non-Islamic buildings into mosques influenced distinctive regional styles of Islamic architecture.

== Islamic holy sites ==
=== Mecca ===
Before Muhammad, the Kaaba and Mecca (referred to as Bakkah in the Quran), were revered as a sacred sanctuary and were sites of pilgrimage. During Muhammad's lifetime (AD 570–632), his tribe, the Quraysh, was in charge of the Kaʿaba, at that time a shrine containing hundreds of idols representing Arabian tribal gods and other religious figures. Muhammad earned the enmity of his tribe by preaching the new religion of Islam. Early Muslims practiced, or attempted to practice, their rituals by the Ka'aba alongside polytheists, until they eventually left Mecca, driven out by escalating persecution. The aborted first pilgrimage, which was prevented by the Quraysh, who promised to allow it the following year in the Hudaybiyah treaty, did not also entail the prevention of continuing practices by polytheists. However, before the second pilgrimage season, allies of the Quraysh violated the treaty, allowing the Muslims to return as conquerors rather than guests. Henceforth, the Kaʿaba was to be dedicated to the worship of the one God alone, and the idols were destroyed. The Black Stone (al-Hajar-ul-Aswad) at the Kaʿaba was a special object of veneration at the site. According to some traditions the text of seven or ten especially honoured poems were suspended around the Kaʿaba.

=== Jerusalem ===
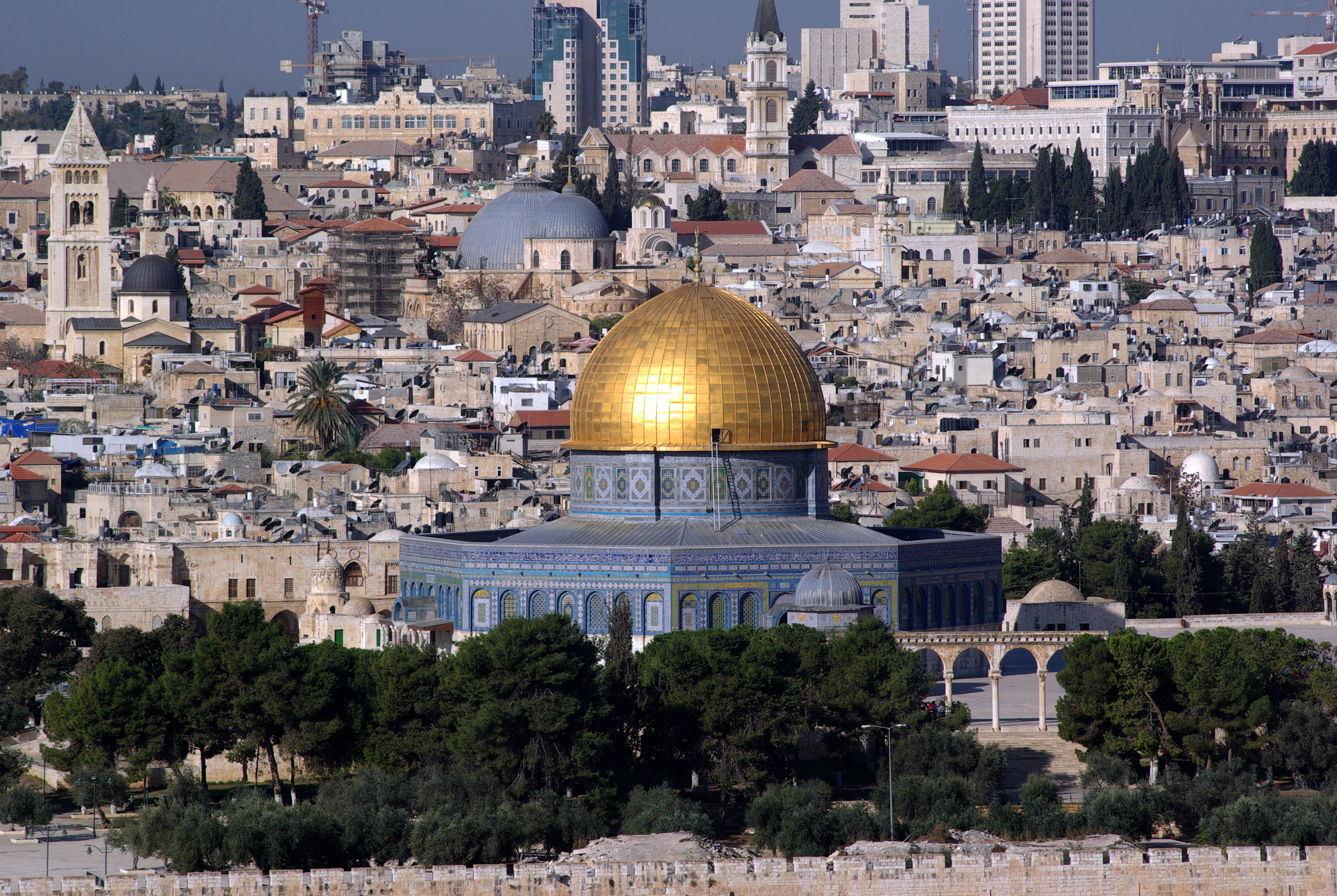
Dome of the Rock is a shrine in Jerusalem. Prophet Muhammad, founder of Islam, is traditionally believed to have ascended into heaven from this site. In Jewish tradition, it is here that Abraham, the progenitor and first patriarch of the Hebrew people, is said to have prepared to sacrifice his son Isaac. The Dome and Al-Aqsa Mosque are both located on the Temple Mount the site of Solomon's Temple and its successors.

Upon the capture of Jerusalem, it is commonly reported that Umar refused to pray in the Church of the Holy Sepulchre in spite of a treaty. The architecturally similar Dome of the Rock was built on the Temple Mount, which was a destroyed site of the holiest Jewish temple, destroyed by the Romans in AD 70 and with consistent Jewish presence in Jerusalem has always been a site of religious prayer for Jews. Umar initially built there a small prayer house which laid the foundation for the later construction of the Al-Aqsa Mosque by the Umayyads.

== Conversion of church buildings ==
=== Europe ===
==== Albania ====
- The Catholic Church of St. Nicholas (Shën Nikollë) was turned into a mosque. After being destroyed in the Communist 1967 anti-religious campaign, the site was turned into an open air mausoleum.
- The Church of St. Stephen in Shkodër was converted into a mosque in 1479 after the city was conquered by the Ottomans.

==== Bosnia and Herzegovina ====
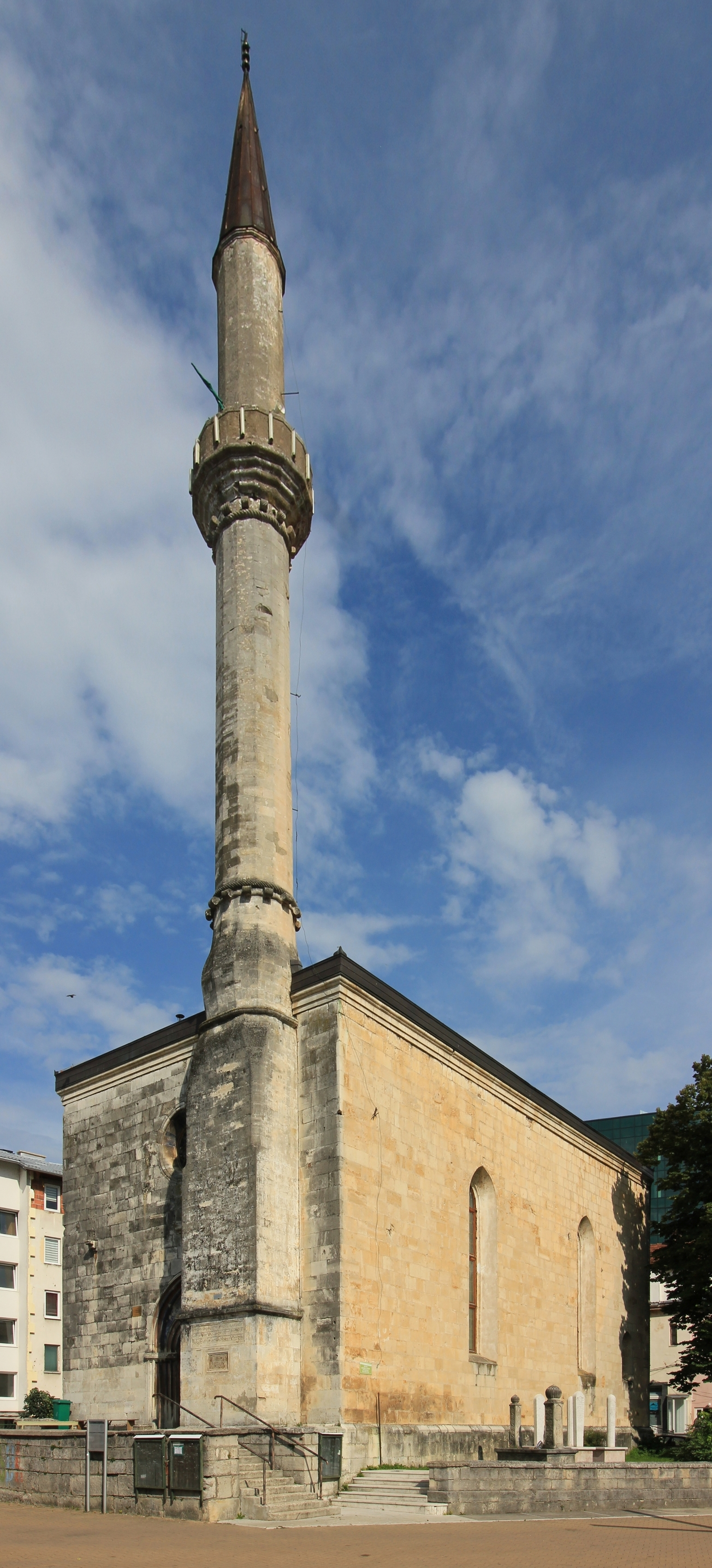
Fethija Mosque in Bihać, Bosnia

The Fethija Mosque (since 1592) of Bihać was a Catholic church devoted to Saint Anthony of Padua (1266).

==== Greece ====
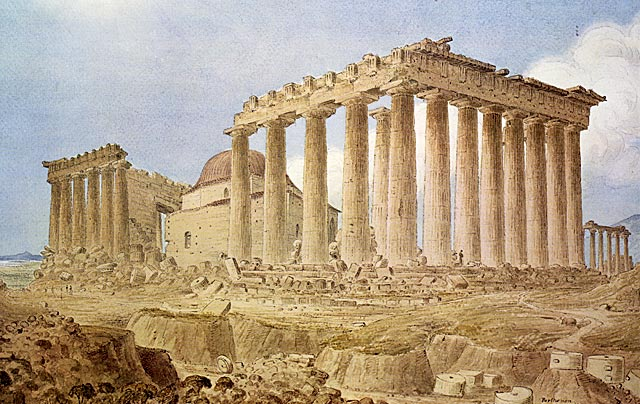
Painting of the ruins of the Parthenon and the Ottoman mosque built after 1715, in the early 1830s

Numerous orthodox churches were converted to mosques during the Ottoman period in Greece. After the Greek War of Independence, many of them were later reconverted into churches. Among them:

- The Church of the Acheiropoietos (Eski Mosque), the Church of Hosios David (Suluca or Murad Mosque), the Church of Prophet Elijah (Saraylı Mosque), the Church of Saint Catherine (Yakup Pasha Mosque), the Church of Saint Panteleimon (Ishakiye Mosque), the Church of Holy Apostles (Soğuksu Mosque), the Church of Hagios Demetrios (Kasımiye Mosque), the Church of Hagia Sophia (Ayasofya Mosque), the Church of Panagia Chalkeon (Kazancilar Mosque), the church of Taxiarches (İki Şerefiye Mosque), the Rotonda of Galerius (Mosque of Suleyman Hortaji Effendi) in Thessaloniki.
- The Cathedral church of Veria (Hünkar Mosque) and the Church of Saint Paul in Veria (Medrese Mosque).
- The Church of Saint John in Ioannina, destroyed by the Ottomans and the Aslan Pasha Mosque was built in its place.
- The Theotokos Kosmosoteira monastery in Feres was converted into a mosque in the mid-14th century, it was reconverted in 1940.
- The original Pantocrator (Kursum Mosque) church building in Patras.
- The gothic-style Panagia tou Kastrou (Enderun Mosque), the Holy Trinity church in Knights Avenue (Khan Zade Mosque) in Rhodes. Converted in 1522, reconverted in 1947.
- The Brontochion Monastery, the Hagia Sophia (Ayasofya Mosque), and Panagia Hodegetria (Fethiye Mosque) churches in Laconia.
- The Hagia Sophia (Bey Mosque) in Drama. Converted in 1430, reconverted in 1922.
- Parthenon in Athens: Some time before the close of the fifteenth century, the Parthenon became a mosque. Before that the Parthenon had been a Greek Orthodox church. Much of it was destroyed in a 1687 explosion, and a smaller mosque was erected within the ruins in 1715; this mosque was demolished in 1843. See Parthenon mosque.
- The Fethiye Mosque in Athens was built on top of a Byzantine basilica. It is currently an exhibition centre.
- The Church of Saint Nicholas (Hünkar Mosque) was originally a Roman Catholic church before it was converted into a mosque in the mid-17th century. It was reconverted in 1918.

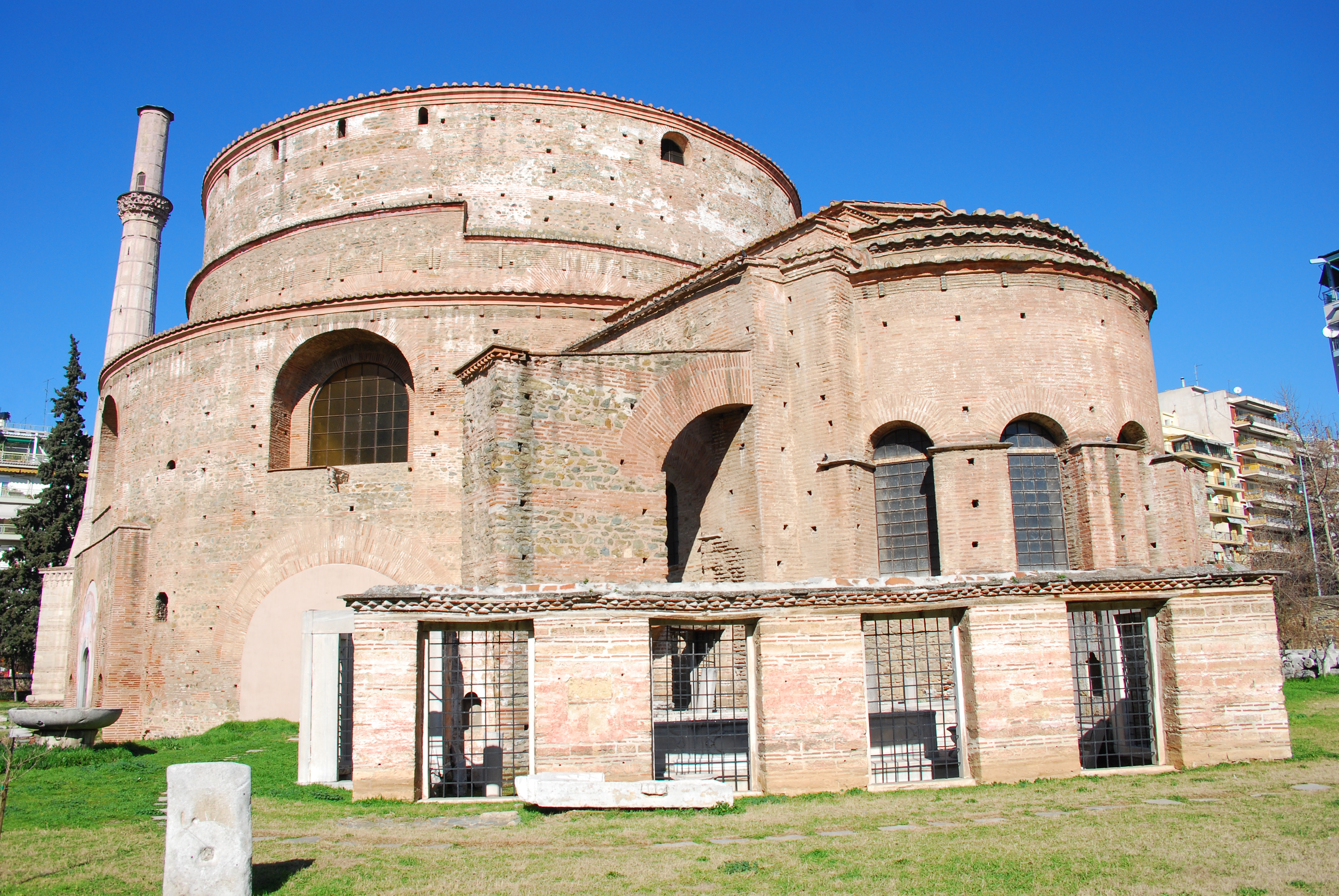
The Rotunda of Galerius in Thessaloniki, initially a Mausoleum of Roman Emperor Galerius, a church (326–1590), then a mosque and again a church after 1912

==== Hungary ====
Following the Ottoman conquest of the Kingdom of Hungary, a number of churches were converted into mosques. Those that survived the era of Ottoman rule, were later reconverted into churches after the Great Turkish War.

- Church of Our Lady of Buda, converted into Eski Djami immediately after the capture of Buda in 1541, reconverted in 1686.
- Church of Mary Magdalene, Buda, converted into Fethiye Djami c. 1602, reconverted in 1686.
- The Franciscan Church of St John the Baptist in Buda, converted into Pasha Djami, destroyed in 1686.

==== Spain ====
A Catholic church dedicated to Saint Vincent of Lérins, was built by the Visigoths in Córdoba, although this has been a matter of scholarly debate. during the reign of Abd al-Rahman I the site was converted into a newly built mosque. In the time of the Reconquista, Christian rule was reestablished and the building became a church once again, the Cathedral of Our Lady of the Assumption.

==== Crimean Peninsula ====
After the Ottomans conquered Mangup, the capital of Principality of Theodoro, a prayer for the Sultan recited in one of the churches which converted into a mosque, and according to Turkish authors "the house of the infidel became the house of Islam."

=== Middle East and North Africa ===
==== Iraq ====
The Islamic State converted a number of churches into mosques after they occupied Mosul in 2014. The churches were restored to their original function after Mosul was liberated in 2017.

- Chaldean Church of St. Joseph in Mosul, Iraq

==== Israel and Palestine ====
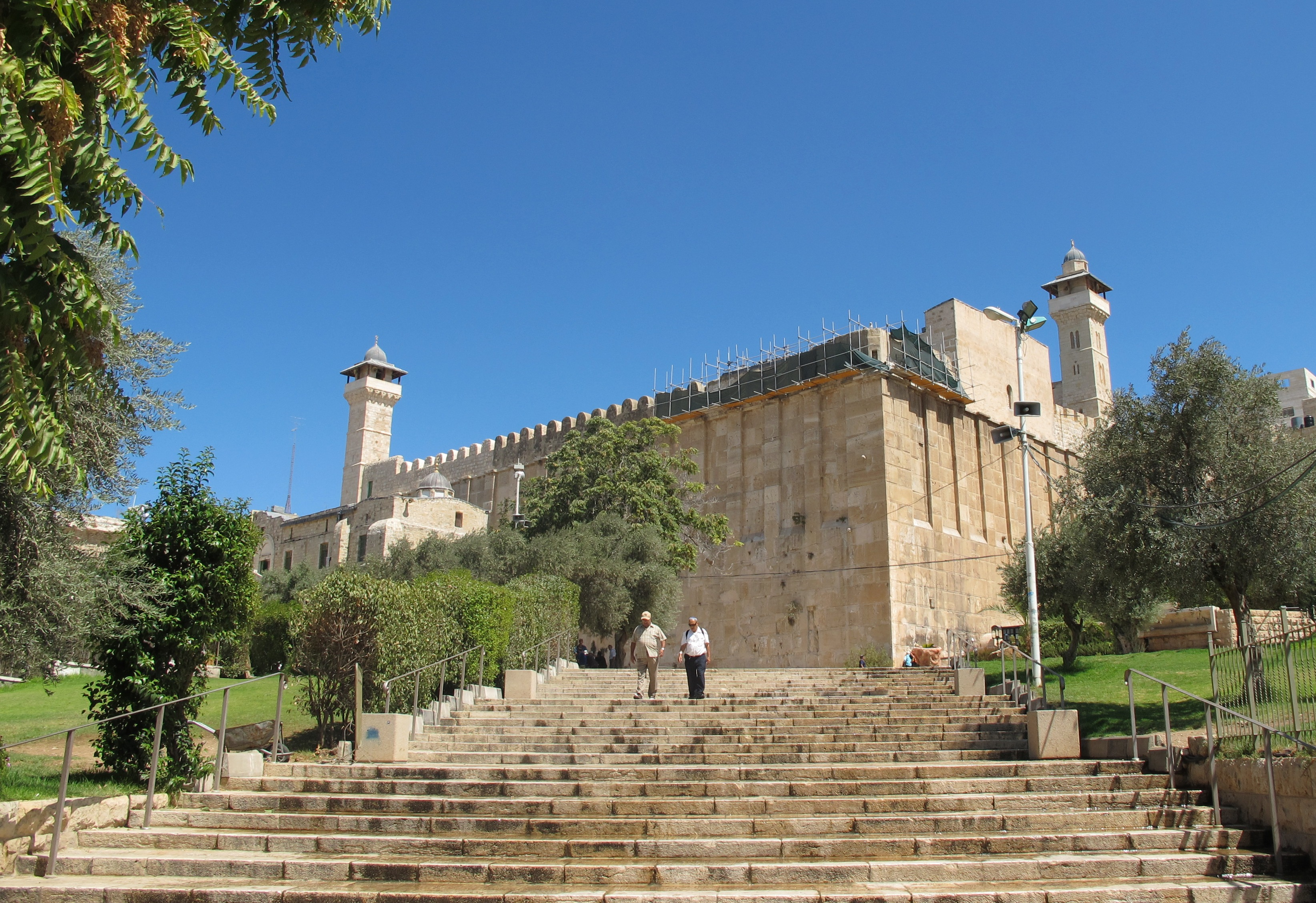
After the conquest of Hebron, this holy place was "taken over from the Jewish tradition" by the Muslim rulers. The cave and the surrounding Herodian enclosure was converted into a mosque.

- Cave of the Patriarchs
- Tombs of Nathan and Gad in Halhoul, transformed into Mosque of Prophet Yunus.

The Herodian shrine of the Cave of the Patriarchs in Hebron, the second most holy site in Judaism, was converted into a church during the Crusades before being turned into a mosque in 1266 and henceforth banned to Jews and Christians. Part of it was restored as a synagogue by Israel after 1967. Other sites in Hebron have undergone Islamification. The Tomb of Jesse and Ruth became the Church of the Forty Martyrs, which then became the Tomb of Isai and later Deir Al Arba'een.

==== Lebanon ====
- Al-Omari Grand Mosque in Beirut, Lebanon; built as the Church of St. John the Baptist by the Knights Hospitaller; converted to mosque in 1291.

==== Morocco ====
- Grand Mosque of Tangier; built on a formerly Roman pagan, and then Roman Christian, site.

==== Syria ====
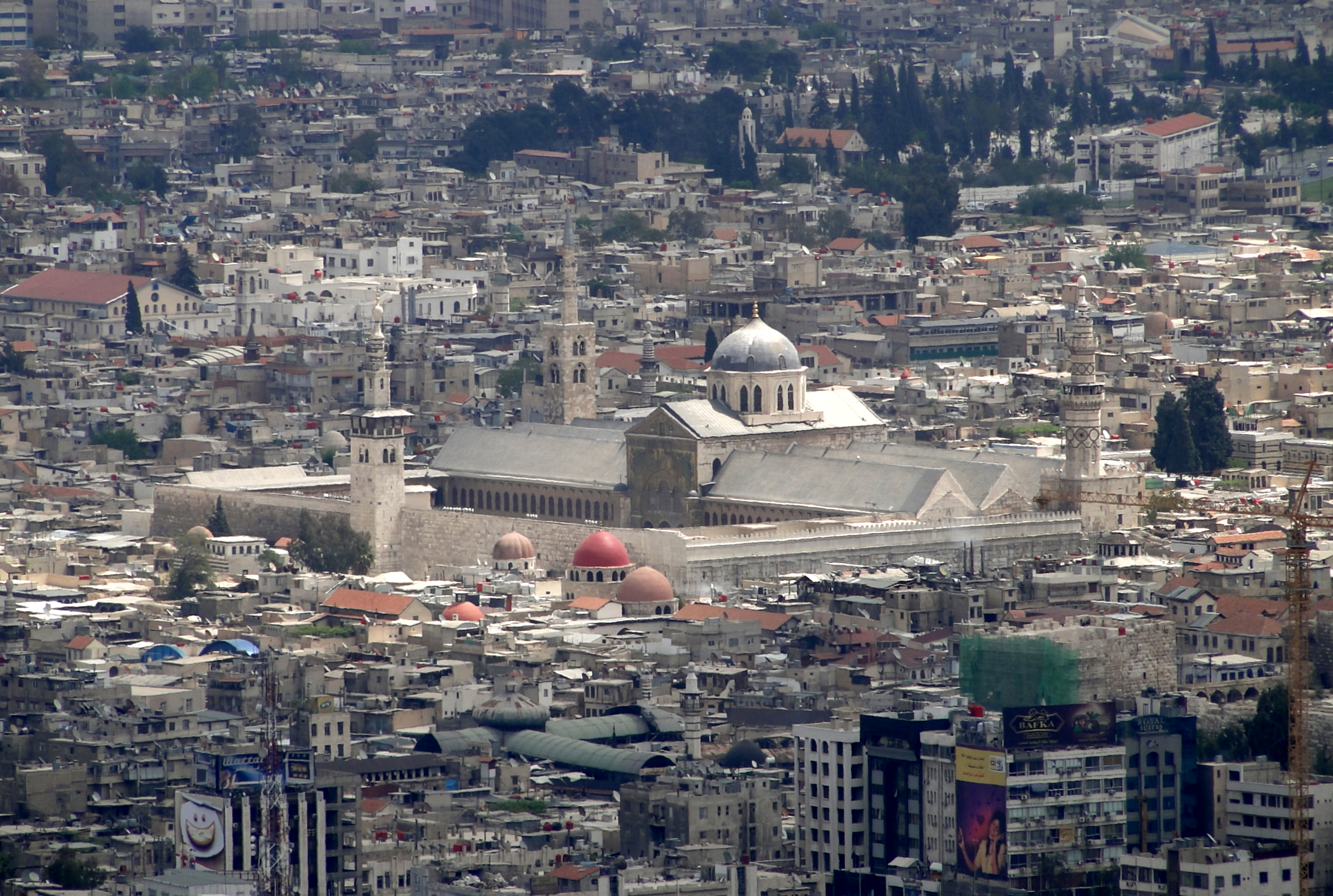
The Umayyad Mosque was built on the site of several prior religious sites.

- The Umayyad Mosque in Damascus; built on the site of a Christian basilica dedicated to John the Baptist (Yahya), which was earlier, a Roman Pagan temple of Jupiter and before that an Aramean temple dedicated to their god of rain, Hadad.
- Great Mosque of al-Nuri in Homs; initially a pagan temple for the sun god ("El-Gabal"), then converted into a church dedicated to Saint John the Baptist
- Great Mosque of Hama; a temple to worship the Roman god Jupiter, later it became a church during the Byzantine era
- Great Mosque of Aleppo; the agora of the Hellenistic period, which later became the garden for the Cathedral of Saint Helena
- The mosque of Job in Al-Shaykh Saad, Syria, was previously a church of Job.

=== Turkey ===
==== Istanbul ====
===== Hagia Sophia =====
Following the Ottoman conquest of Anatolia, virtually all of the churches of Istanbul were converted into mosques except the Church of Saint Mary of the Mongols.

- Hagia Sophia (from the Greek: Ἁγία Σοφία, "Holy Wisdom"; Latin: Sancta Sophia or Sancta Sapientia; Turkish: Ayasofya) was the cathedral of Constantinople in the state church of the Roman Empire and the seat of the Eastern Orthodox Church's Patriarchate. After 1453 it became a mosque, and since 1931 it has been a museum in Istanbul, Turkey. From the date of its dedication in 360 until 1453, it served as the Orthodox cathedral of the imperial capital, except between 1204 and 1261, when it became the Roman Catholic cathedral under the Latin Patriarch of Constantinople of the Western Crusader-established Latin Empire. In 1453, Constantinople was conquered by the Ottoman Turks under Sultan Mehmed II, who subsequently ordered the building converted into a mosque. The bells, altar, iconostasis, ambo and sacrificial vessels were removed and many of the mosaics were plastered over. Islamic features – such as the mihrab, minbar, and four minarets – were added while in the possession of the Ottomans. The building was a mosque from 29 May 1453 until 1931, when it was secularised. It was opened as a museum on 1 February 1935. On 10 July 2020, the decision of the Council of Ministers to transform it into a museum was canceled by Council of State and the Turkish President Erdoğan signed a decree annulling the Hagia Sophia's museum status, reverting it to a mosque.

===== Other churches =====
- The Church of the Holy Apostles became the cathedral church and seat of the patriarchate for three years after the Fall of Constantinople, as Hagia Sophia became the city's Jama masjid. The Justinianic church was already in disrepair and in 1461 it was demolished and the Fatih Mosque was erected in its place.
- The Church of the Pantocrator, a church favoured for imperial burials in the latter Byzantine Empire, became the Zeyrek Mosque.
- The Church of SS Sergius and Bacchus, a church built by Justinian I, became a mosque dubbed the Little Hagia Sophia.
- The Church of Saint Andrew in Krisei, became the Koca Mustafa Pasha Mosque.
- The Church of Saint Thekla of the Palace of Blachernae, became the Atik Mustafa Pasha Mosque.
- The nunnery of Saint Theodosia, became the Gül Mosque.
- The Chora Church became the Kariye Mosque.
- The Monastery of Stoudios became the İmrahor Mosque.
- The Church of Saint John the Forerunner by-the-Dome became the Hirami Ahmet Pasha Mosque.
- The Church of Myrelaion became the Bodrum Mosque.
- The Catholic Church of Saint Paul became the Arap Mosque.
- The Lips Monastery became the Fenari Isa Mosque.
- The Monastery of Christ Pantepoptes became the Eski Imaret Mosque.
- The Church of Theotokos Kyriotissa became the Kalenderhane Mosque.
- The Church of Hagios Theodoros at Vefa became the Church-Mosque of Vefa.
- The Monastery of Manuel became the Kefeli Mosque.
- The Monastery of Gastria became the Sancaktar Hayrettin Mosque.
- The Church of Saint Mary of Constantinople became the Odalar Mosque.
- The Pammakaristos Church became the Fethiye Mosque.
- The Toklu Dede Mosque was an Eastern Orthodox church of unknown dedication.
- The monastery of the Holy Martyrs Menodora, Metrodora, and Nymphodora became the Manastır Mosque.

==== Rest of Turkey ====
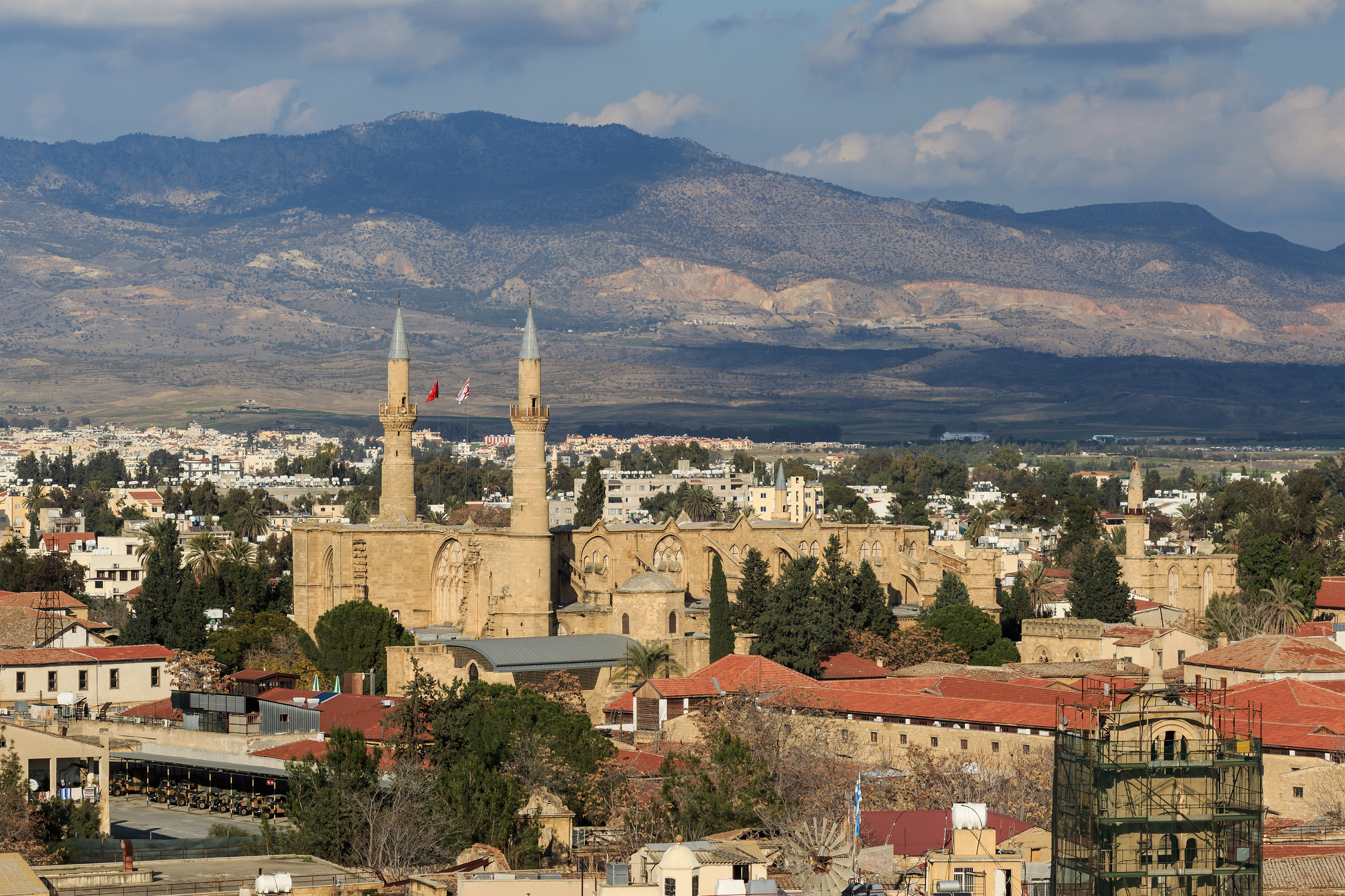
The Selimiye Mosque was the largest and oldest surviving Gothic church in Cyprus, which was possibly constructed on the site of an earlier Byzantine church.

Elsewhere in Turkey numerous churches were converted into mosques, including:

===== Orthodox =====
- Hagia Sophia Church in Nicaea (İznik)
- Hagia Sophia Church in Trebizond (Trabzon)
- Panagia Chrysokephalos Church, became the Fatih Mosque in Trabzon (Trabzon)
- Nakip Mosque was a Byzantine church. (Trabzon)
- Hagios Eugenios Church, became the New Friday Mosque (Trabzon)
- Saint Paul Cathedral, became the Tarsus Old Mosque (Tarsus)
- Church of Virgin Mary, became the Kesik Minare (Antalya)
- Church of Christ and Saint Stephen, became the Fatih Mosque in Tirilye (Tirilye)
- Hagia Sophia church in Enez
- Parkhali Monastery in Artvin
- Khakhuli Monastery in Erzurum

===== Armenian Apostolic =====
Hundreds of Armenian Churches were converted into Mosques in Turkey and Azerbaijan.

- Cathedral of Kars
- Cathedral of Ani
- Liberation Mosque, ex St Mary's Church Cathedral, Gaziantep

== Conversion of Hindu and Jain temples ==
Temple Name	Mosque Name	Images	City	Country	Ruler	Notes	Current Status
Kashi Vishwanath Temple	Gyanvapi Mosque		Varanasi, UP	India	Aurangzeb	The temple was demolished under the orders of Aurangzeb, who then constructed the Gyanvapi Mosque atop the original Hindu temple. The demolition was motivated by the rebellion of local zamindars (landowners) associated with the temple. The demolition was intended as a warning to the anti-Mughal factions and Hindu religious leaders in the city.	Mosque; temple reconstructed adjacent to Mosque
Keshavdeva Temple	Shahi Edgah		Mathura, UP	India	Aurangzeb	Aurangzeb attacked Mathura and destroyed that Keshavdeva Temple in 1670 and built the Shahi Eidgah in its place.	Mosque; temple reconstructed adjacent to Mosque
Somnath Temple			Veraval, Gujarat	India	Mahmud of Ghazni, Alauddin Khalji, Muzaffar Shah I, Mahmud Begada, Aurangzeb	The temple was attacked, destroyed and rebuilt multiple times and was converted into an Islamic Mosque in the 19th century.	Temple rebuilt
Jain and Saraswati Temple	Adhai Din Ka Jhonpra		Ajmer, Rajasthan	India	Qutb ud-Din Aibak	The original building was partially destroyed and converted into a mosque by Qutb ud-Din Aibak of Delhi in the late 12th century. Iltutmish further built the mosque in 1213 CE.	Mosque
Rudra Mahalaya Temple	Jami Mosque		Siddhpur, Gujarat	India	Ahmad Shah I	The temple was dismantled during the siege of the city by Ahmed Shah I (1410–44) of Muzaffarid dynasty; parts of it were reused in setting up a new congregational mosque.	Ruined, partly converted into Mosque

== Conversion of synagogues ==
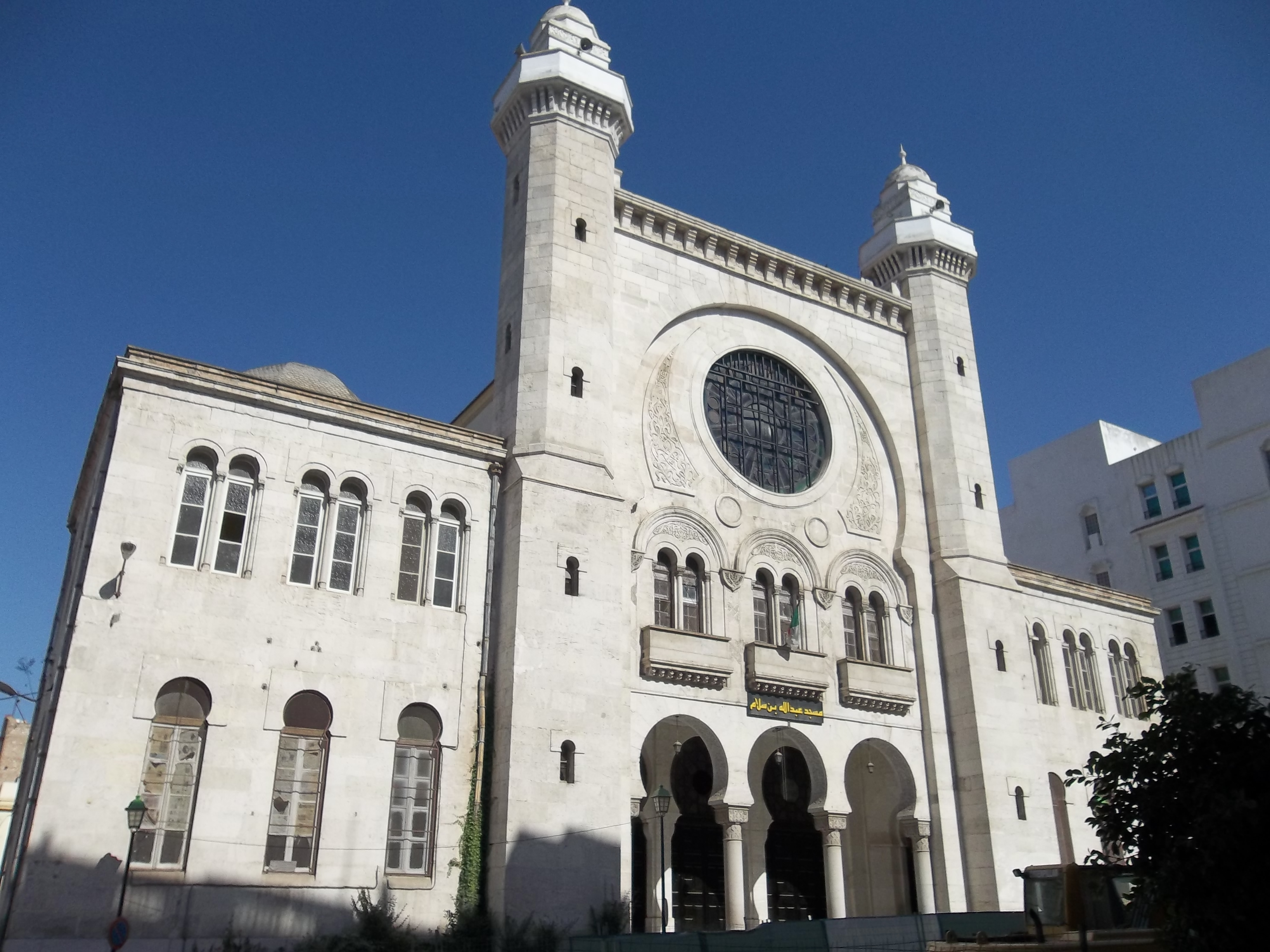
The Great Synagogue of Oran was the largest synagogue in North Africa until it was converted into the Abdellah Ben Salem Mosque in 1975.

=== North Africa ===
==== Algeria ====
- Great Synagogue of Algiers, now Ben Farès Mosque
- Great Synagogue of Oran, now Abdellah Ben Salem Mosque

=== Europe ===
==== France ====
- Or Thora Synagogue of Marseille, built in the 1960s by Jews from Algeria, was turned into a mosque in 2016 after being bought by a conservative Muslim organization, the al-Badr organization.

==== The Netherlands ====
- The Ashkenazi synagogue on Wagenstraat street of The Hague, built in 1844, became the Aqsa Mosque in 1981. The synagogue had been sold to the city by the Jewish community in 1976, on the grounds that it would not be converted into a church. In 1979 Turkish Muslim residents occupied the abandoned building and demanded it be turned into a mosque, citing alleged construction safety concerns with their usual mosque. The synagogue was conceded to the Muslim community three years later.

== Influence on Islamic architecture ==
The conversion of non-Islamic religious buildings into mosques during the first centuries of Islam played a major role in the development of Islamic architectural styles. Distinct regional styles of mosque design, which have come to be known by such names as Arab, Persian, Andalusian, and others, commonly reflected the external and internal stylistic elements of churches and other temples characteristic for that region.

== See also ==
- Conversion of mosques into non-Islamic places of worship
- Christianized sites
- Islam and other religions
- List of destroyed heritage
