= Holy Trinity Church, Rhodes =

Greek Orthodox church in Rhodes, Greece

Church of Holy Trinity
- Ιερός Ναός Αγίας Τριάδος
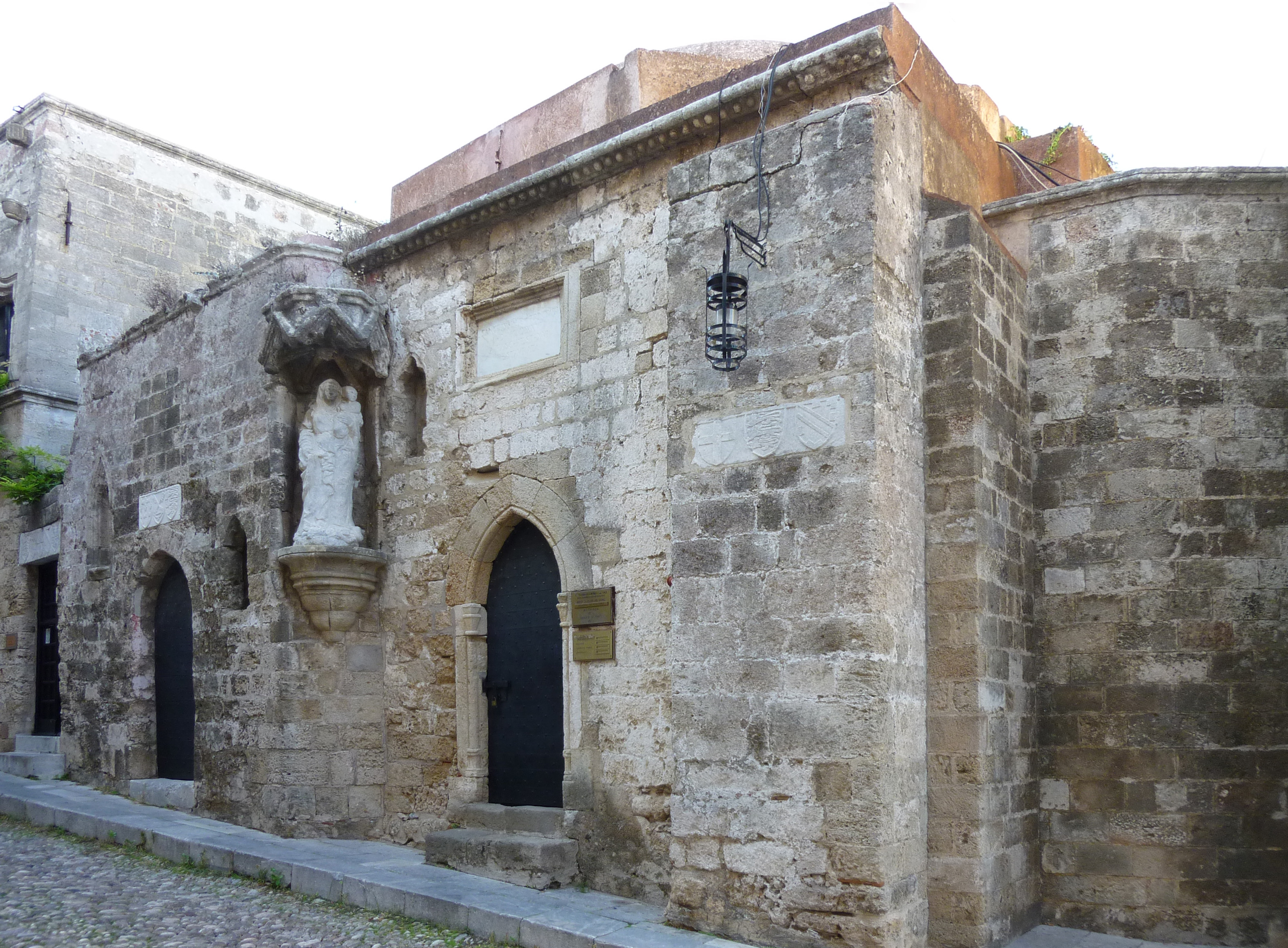
- Entrance to the church, in 2011

- Location of the church, former mosque, in Greece
- Church of Holy Trinity
- 36°26′42″N 28°13′32″E
- Location: Town of Rhodes, Rhodes, South Aegean
- Country: Greece
- Language: Greek
- Denomination: Greek Orthodox
- Previous denomination: Islam (1522–1912)

History
- Former name: Khan Zade Mescidi
- Status: Church (c. 1365–1522); Mosque (1522–1912); Church (since 1912– )
- Founder: Knights Hospitaller
- Dedication: Holy Trinity
- Earlier dedication: Archangel Michael

Architecture
- Functional status: Active (as a church); Abandoned (as a mosque)
- Architectural type: Church
- Completed: c. 1365 (as a church); 1522 (as a mosque); 1912 (as a church)

Specifications
- Materials: Brick; stone

Administration
- Metropolis: Rhodes

The Church of Holy Trinity (Greek: Ιερός Ναός Αγίας Τριάδος) is a Greek Orthodox church located in the Street of the Knights in the city of Rhodes, on the island of Rhodes, in the South Aegean region of Greece. It is one of the two churches dedicated to the Holy Trinity within the old medieval town of Rhodes. The building was converted to a mosque during the Ottoman era; and subsequently reconsecrated as a church.

== History ==
The church was built between 1365 and 1374, and was dedicated to Archangel Michael, but later it was dedicated to the Holy Trinity. The Church of Archangel Michael was built by the Knights Hospitaller and was therefore dedicated to the Catholic doctrine.

During the Ottoman Turkish rule on the island, it was converted into a mosque under the name Khan Zade Mescidi. It was converted into an Orthodox church when the Dodecanese islands were annexed by Greece after World War II.

== Architecture ==
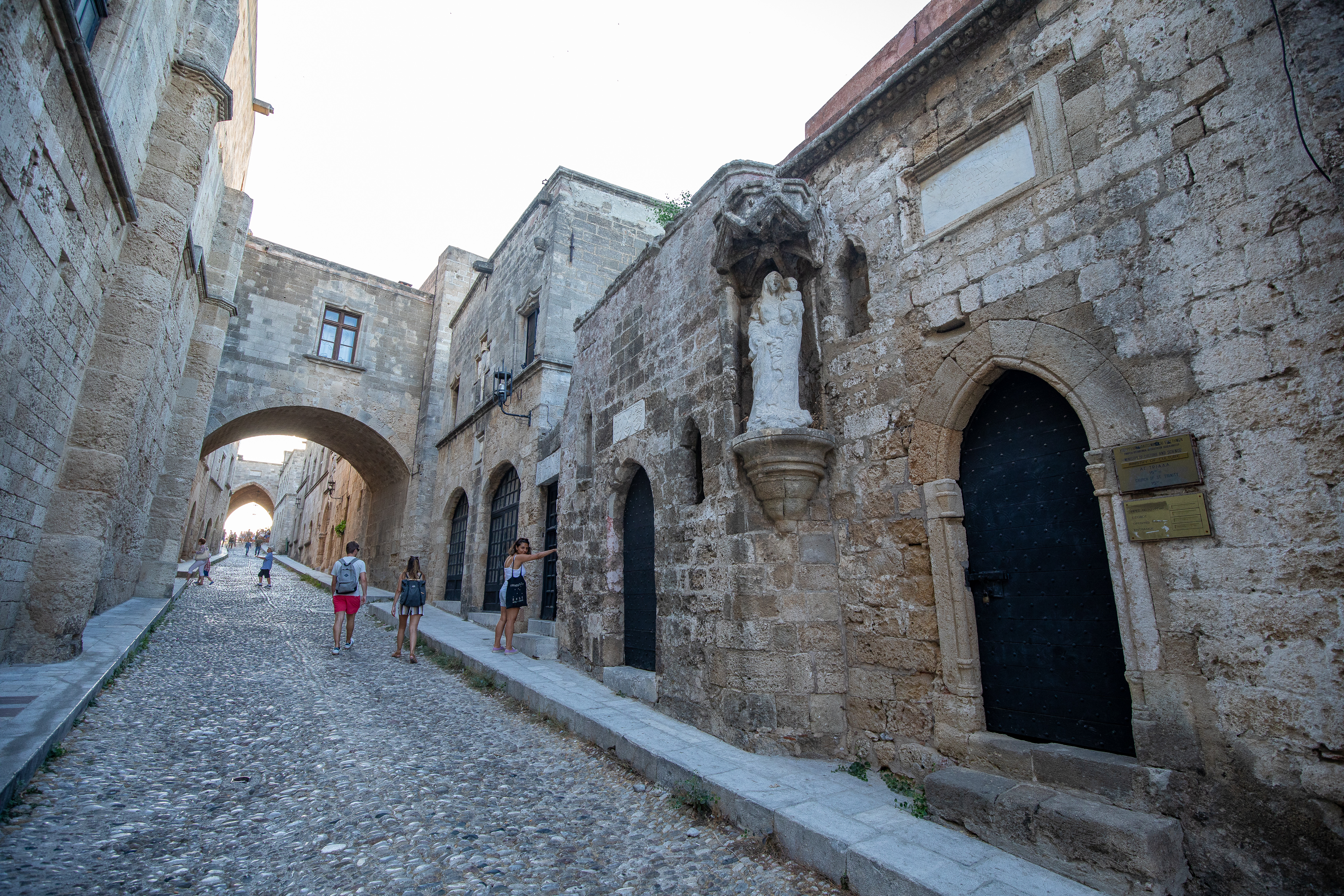
The church on Knights Street

In its original form, the church was single-room building and was probably covered by a single arch. The coat of arms of the Holy See, framed by the coat of arms of England, can be seen on the eaves of the main entrance, located on the Street of the Knights in the medieval town of Rhodes, in the northeast of the island.

As for the murals that once adorned the interior of the Holy Trinity Church, only few remain, with intense Italian conservation interventions. In the quadrant of the arch is depicted the rare iconographic theme of the Throne of Grace. The Ancient of Days is represented enthroned holding the crucifix in his hands; it is a western variation of the theme of the Holy Trinity, after which the church was named. This central decoration is flanked by the figures of the Virgin Mary and Saint John the Baptist, while the semi-cylinder is decorated with concelebrating saints.

The wall paintings were finished at the end of the 15th, or the beginning of the 16th, century.

The elliptical dome that covers the monument was added after its conversion to a mosque.

== Gallery ==
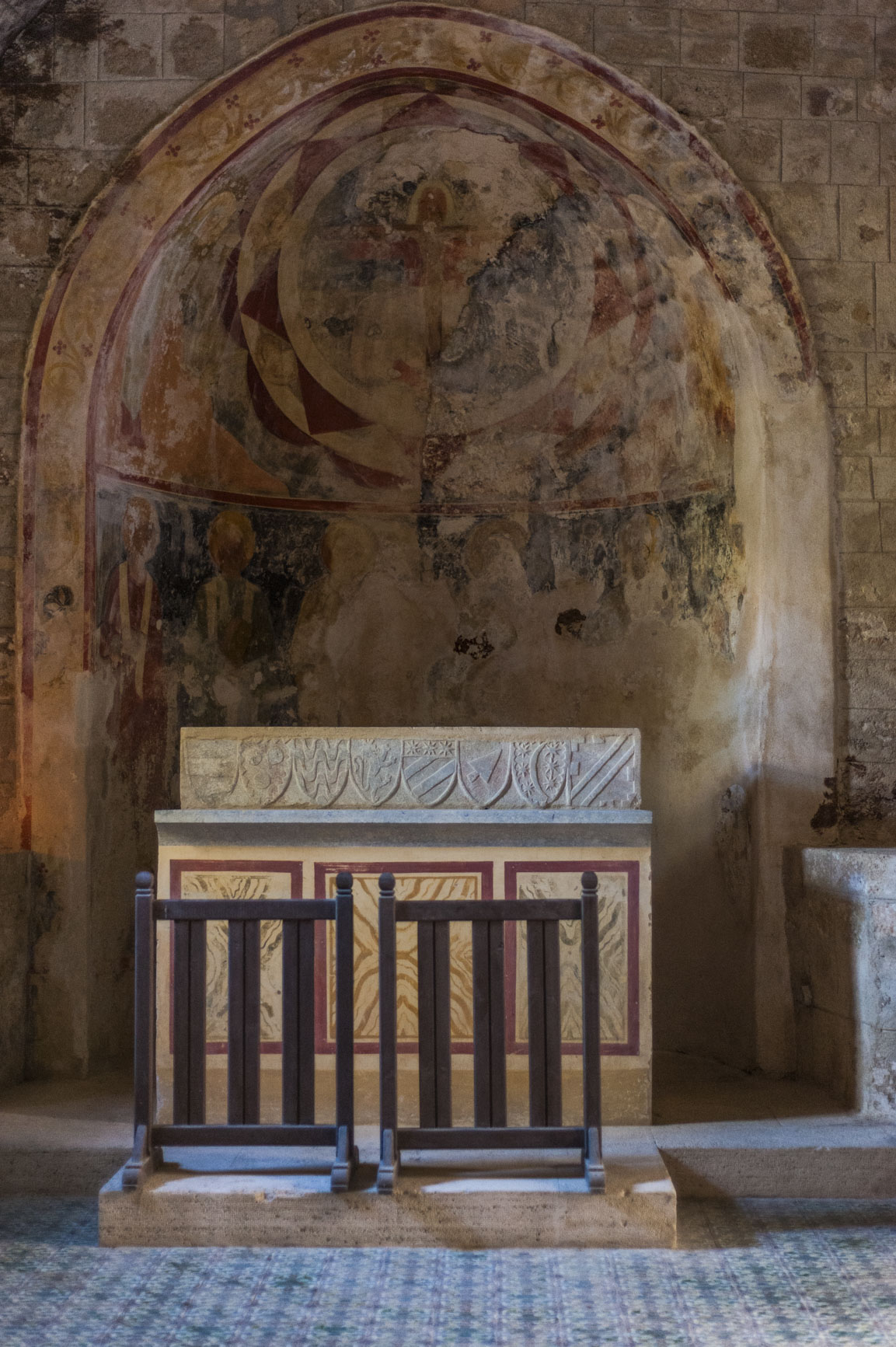
Mihrab, or niche

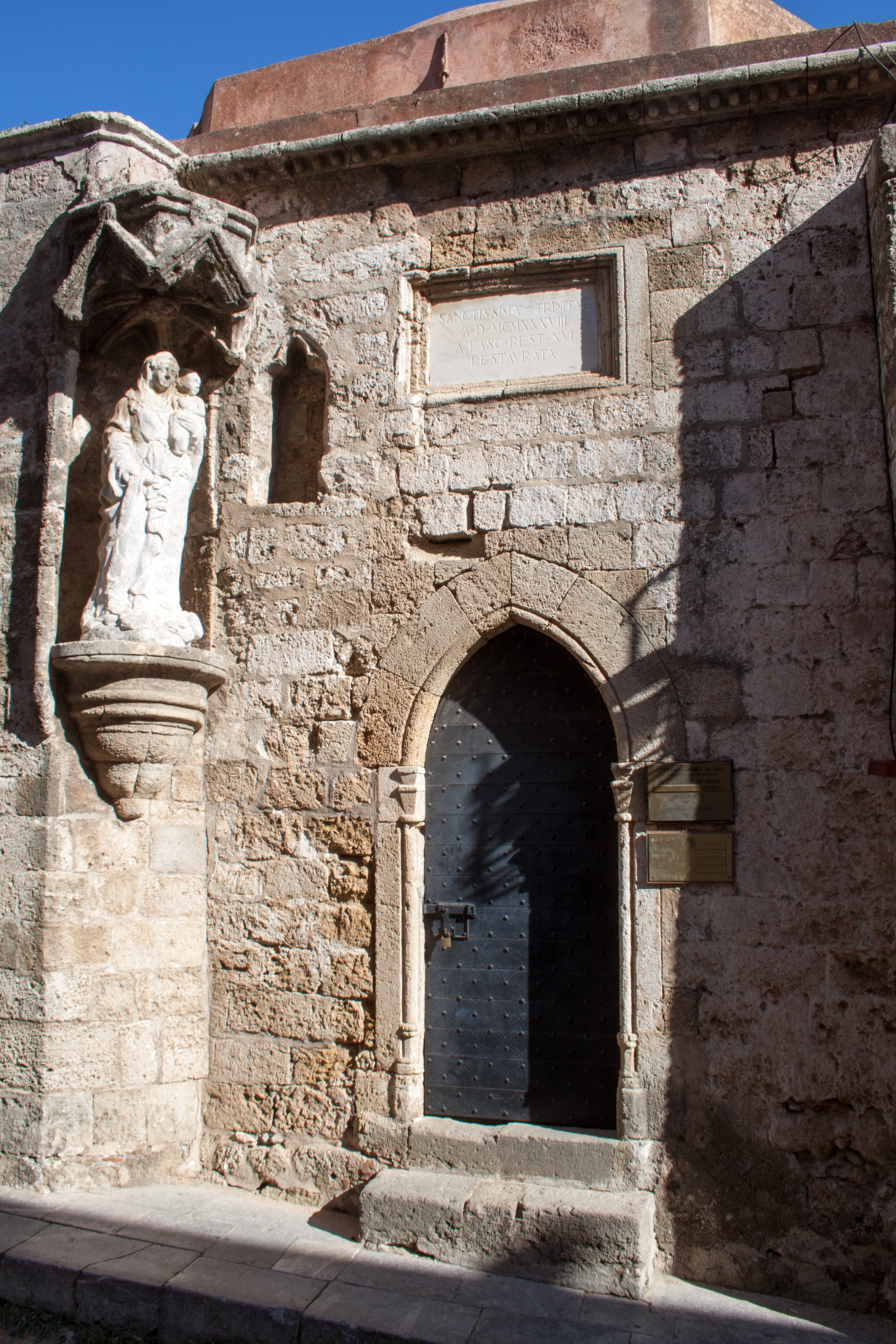
Statue in the entrance

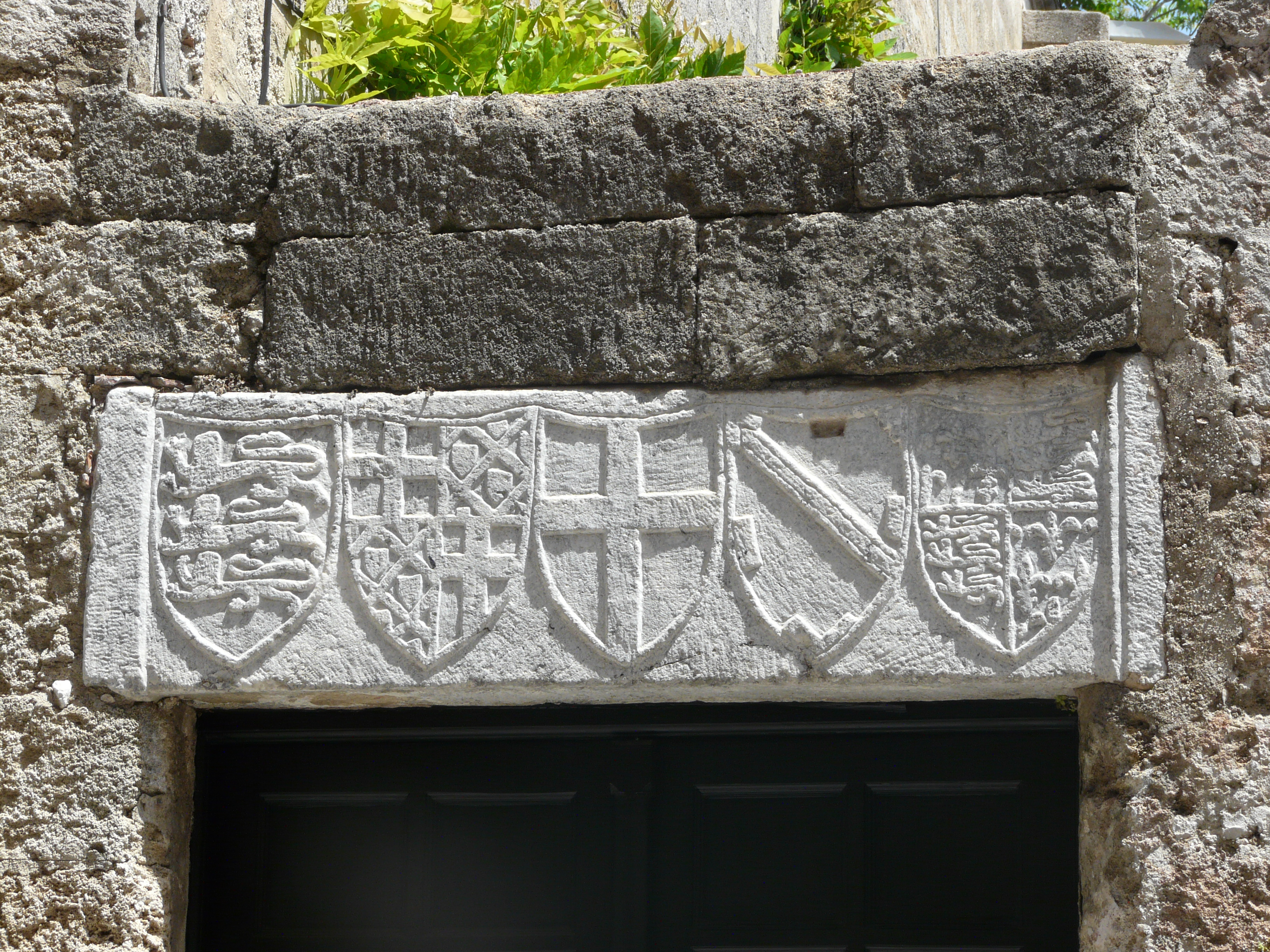
Coats of arms

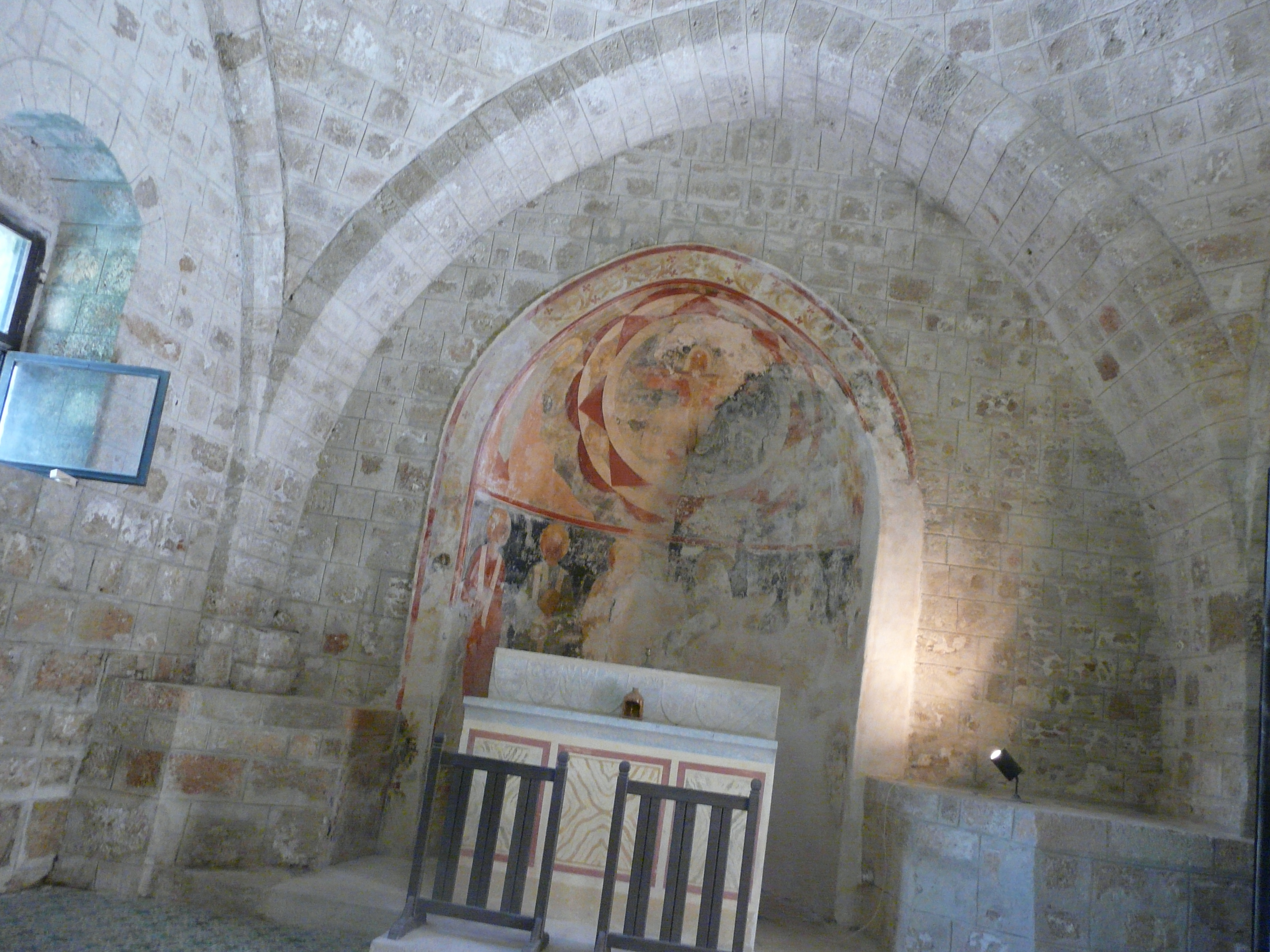
Interior

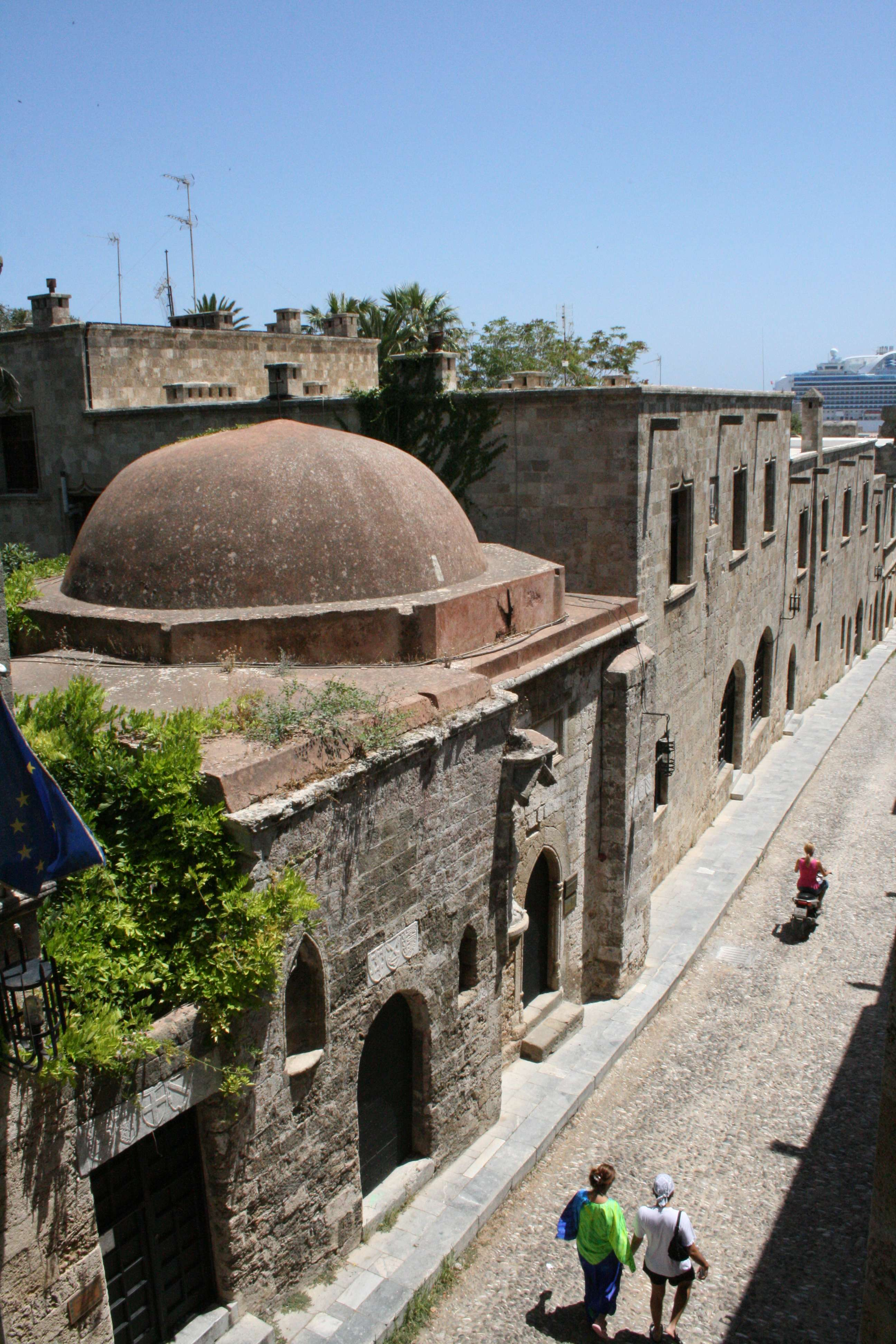
Panoramic view

== See also ==
- Catholic Church in Greece
- Conversion of non-Islamic places of worship into mosques
- Islam in Greece
- List of former mosques in Greece
- Ottoman Rhodes
