= Liberation Mosque =

Mosque in Şahinbey, Turkey

Coordinates: 37°03′37″N 37°22′32″E

- Kurtuluş Camii
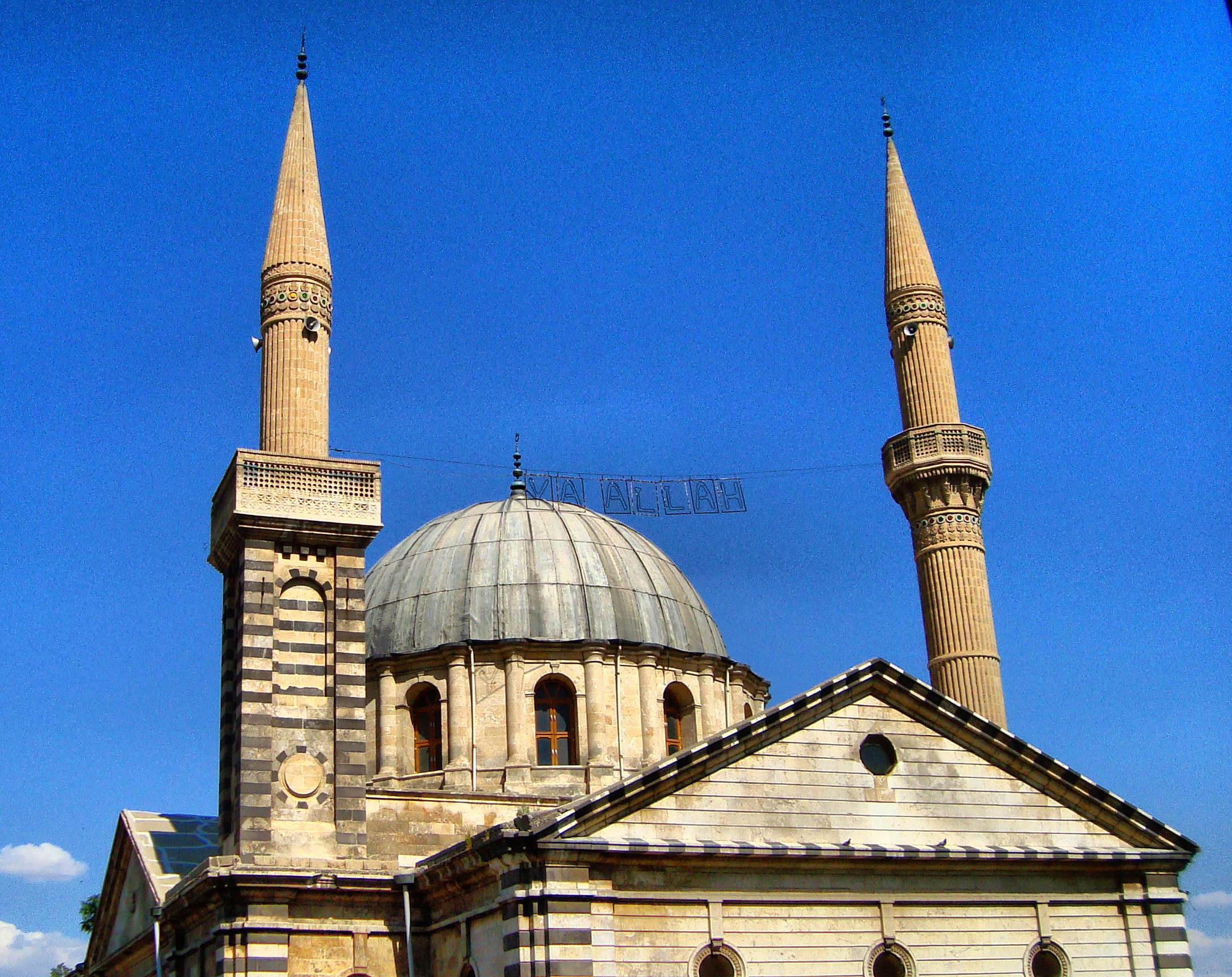
- Liberation Mosque in May 2009

Religion
- Affiliation: Islam, originally Christianity

Location
- Location: Şahinbey, Gaziantep Province, Turkey
- Interactive map of Liberation Mosque

Architecture
- Architect: Sarkis Balyan
- Type: mosque
- Established: 1986 (as mosque)
- Groundbreaking: 1892
- Completed: 1893

Liberation Mosque (Turkish: Kurtuluş Camii), formerly the St. Mary's Cathedral or Holy Mother of God Church (Armenian: Սուրբ Աստուածածին Եկեղեցի, romanized: Surp Asdvazdadzin Egeghetsʿi), is located in the Tepebaşı district of Şahinbey, Gaziantep, Turkey. Initially built as an Armenian Apostolic church, it was converted into a stable after the Armenian genocide and later into a jail. Sarkis Balyan, the Ottoman-Armenian architect serving Sultan Abdul Hamid II, designed the church. The building was constructed between 1892 and 1893, undertaken by the stonemason Sarkis Taşçıyan. The church was part of a complex which also contained a school and the administrative buildings of the dioceses of the kaza of Antep.

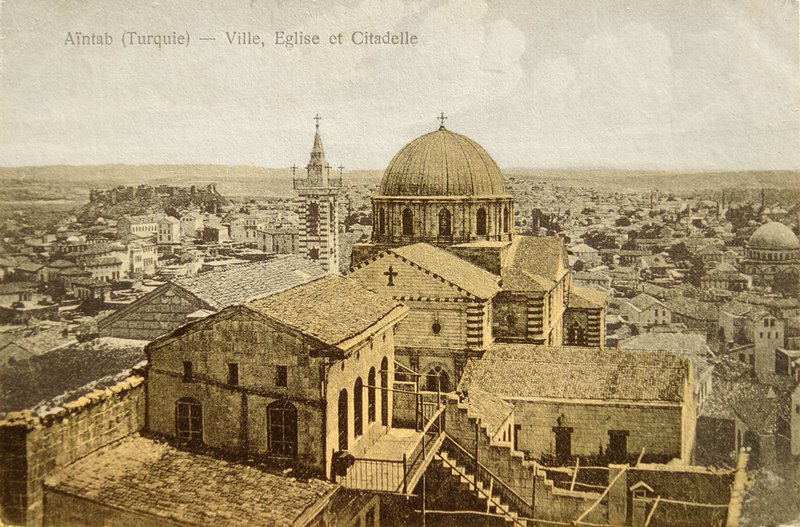
Holy Mother of God Armenian Church as depicted in a photograph in 1920.

In 1915, almost all of the Gaziantep Armenians were deported to the Syrian Desert during the genocide. The church was sealed on 22 August 1915; its sacramentals and furnishings were put in a large stable, then they were bought and sold at an auction. For over three years the cathedral was used by the government for military purposes. Next, it was turned into a prison in the early 1920s and served as such until the 1970s.

The building was converted into a mosque in 1986. The top half of the bell tower was demolished, the remainder converted into a single-balcony minaret. The bell, which was cast in the 19th century in South America, was taken to Gaziantep Museum.

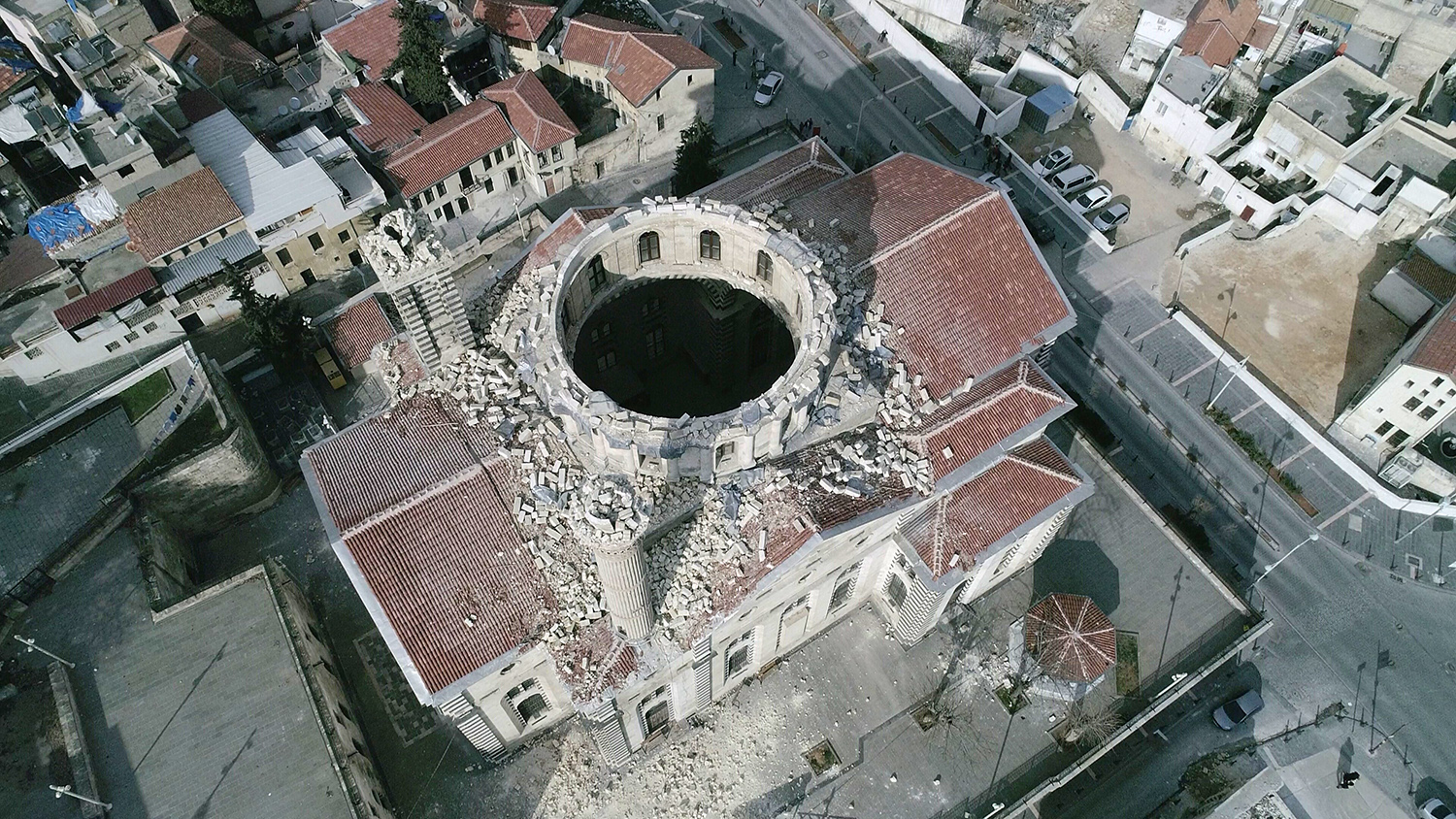
Mosque after the earthquake

After renovation, the mosque reopened on 17 June 2017.

During the 2023 Turkey–Syria earthquakes, its dome and minarets collapsed and were rebuilt as a mosque.

== See also ==
- Armenian cultural heritage in Turkey
- Conversion of non-Islamic places of worship into mosques
- Armenian architecture
