= Nakip Mosque =

Mosque in Trabzon, Turkey

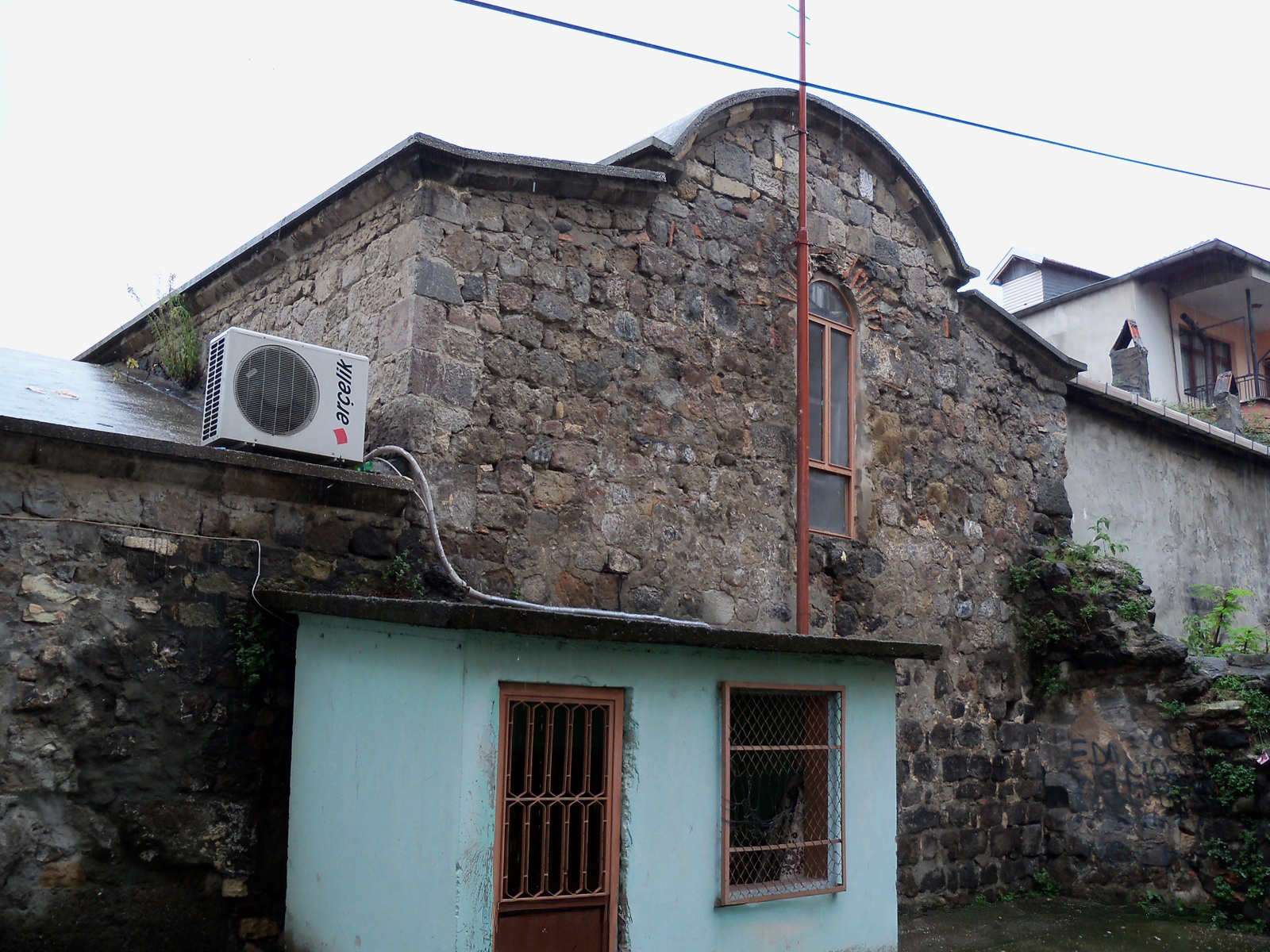

Religion
- Affiliation: Islam

Location
- Municipality: Trabzon
- Country: Turkey

Architecture
- Type: mosque

The Molla Nakip Mosque is a mosque in Pazarkapi district of Trabzon, Turkey.

== History ==
It was built in the 10th or 11th century, during Byzantine times as a church, and received its present name and function after the Ottoman conquest of the city in 1461. The north entrance was built by the Ottomans. In 1975 a large restoration took place and the ceiling was covered with concrete. The building has three naves and their apses are made of ancient stone blocks.
