= Hagia Sophia, Drama =

Byzantine church in Drama, Greece

Coordinates: 41.1522°N 24.1438°E

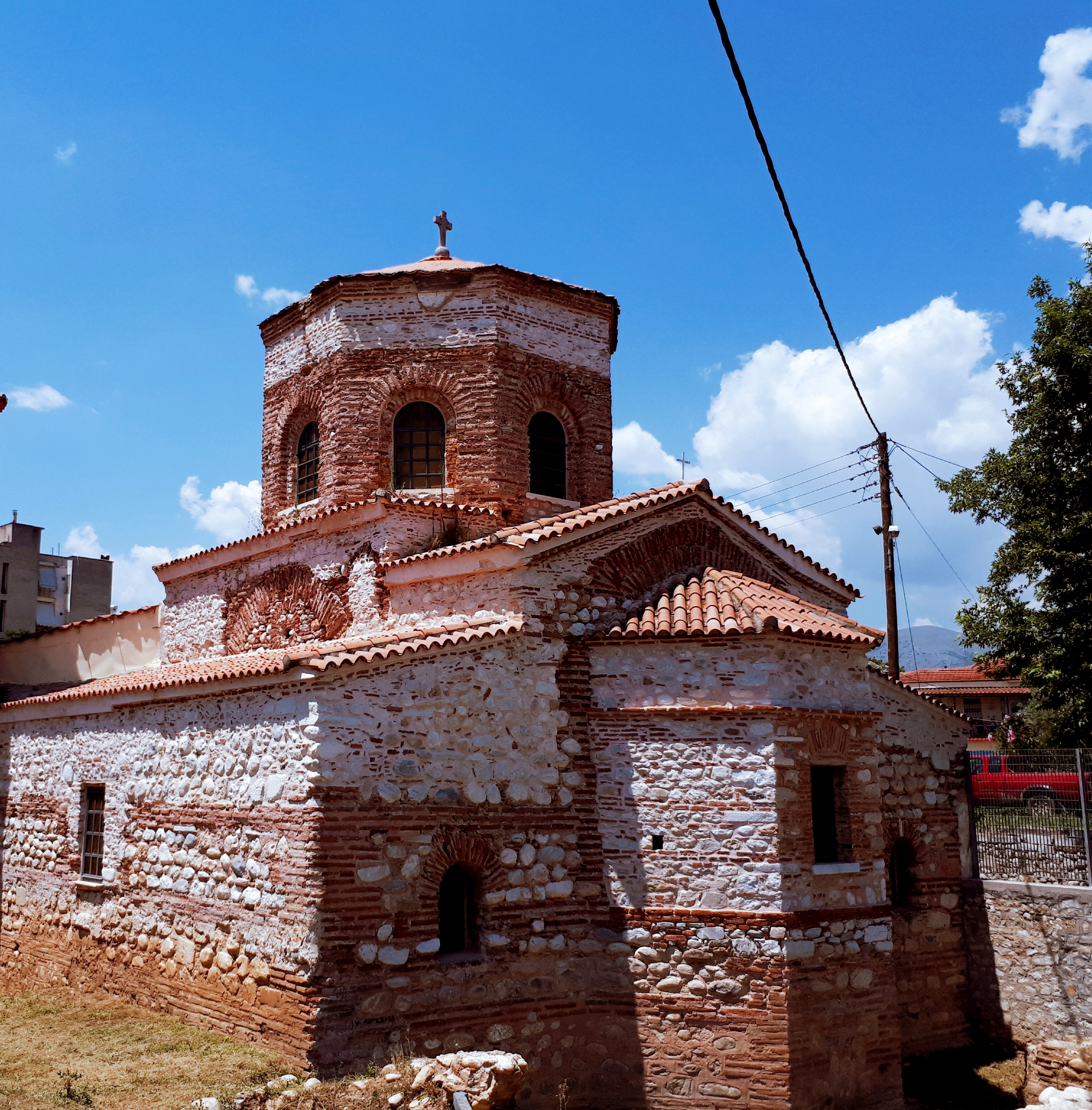
Hagia Sophia church in Drama

The Church of Hagia Sophia or Holy Wisdom (Greek: Ναός Αγίας Σοφίας) is a 10th-century Byzantine church in the town of Drama, Greece.

== History ==
Hagia Sophia is the oldest surviving preserved building in Drama. It was built on the highest point of the greater area during the tenth century AD, along with Drama's city walls, which used the same stones as the church. It was probably dedicated to Virgin Mary, erected on the site of a previous early Christian basilica. The relics kept in that old church were unearthed during renovation work on the courtyard.

The conditions under which the church was erected remain unknown, but it coincides with a period of great prosperity of the Byzantine Empire, as the Macedonian dynasty came to the throne.

According to the Metropolitan of Drama Agathangelos, the church was converted into a mosque by the Ottoman Turks in 1430, when Drama was conquered by the Ottoman Empire. However, it has also been suggested that it was converted during the reign of Sultan Murad I (r. 1359–1389). Under Ottoman rule, it was called Bey Mosque (Turkish: Bey Camii).

Shortly after Drama was annexed by Greece during the Balkan Wars, it was converted back into a Christian church. In 1922, the church was dedicated to the holy wisdom of God by Greek refugees from Anatolia and Eastern Thrace who were relocated to Drama.

== Architecture ==
In terms of architecture, the church exemplifies the domed style with a forecourt. It is an almost square room with an interior length of 13,40 m. and 10,46 m, while the forecourt takes on a pi-shaped form. Its features maintain similarities with emblematic monuments of Byzantine church architecture, such as the Hagia Sophia in Thessalonica and the Dormition of the Virgin in Nicaea, Bithynia, Asia Minor, and demonstrates influences from two of the most important centers of the empire, Constantinople and Thessalonica.

The Hagia Sophia church must have originally built on the highest point of the area, which would have been lower than it is today. Later embankments would have caused the soil to rise, with the result of the church sinking into the ground, reinforcing its stability, which might be the reason why it withstood the 1829 earthquake that destroyed the rest of Drama. The church as it survives today is a product of successive phases, that began as far back as Byzantine times. It is a transitional type with portico, topped with a dome.

The original mural depicting the Dormition of the Mother of God that was covered in plaster during Ottoman times is still preserved. A mural dating to 1917 depicting several scenes from the Second Coming can be found on the narthex.

== Restoration ==
The Greek Ministry of Culture announced restoration works, which included the removal of the western part of the church, that was also used as a mosque in the past, the current bell tower, which was the former minaret, the excavation of the entire western part of the Byzantine church in order to unearth it, and the highlighting of the frescoes and the actual floor, that is also covered with newer constructions. In this way, the older look of the church will be restored, with reduced influence from the newer additional constructions.

== Gallery ==
Hagia Sophia of Drama

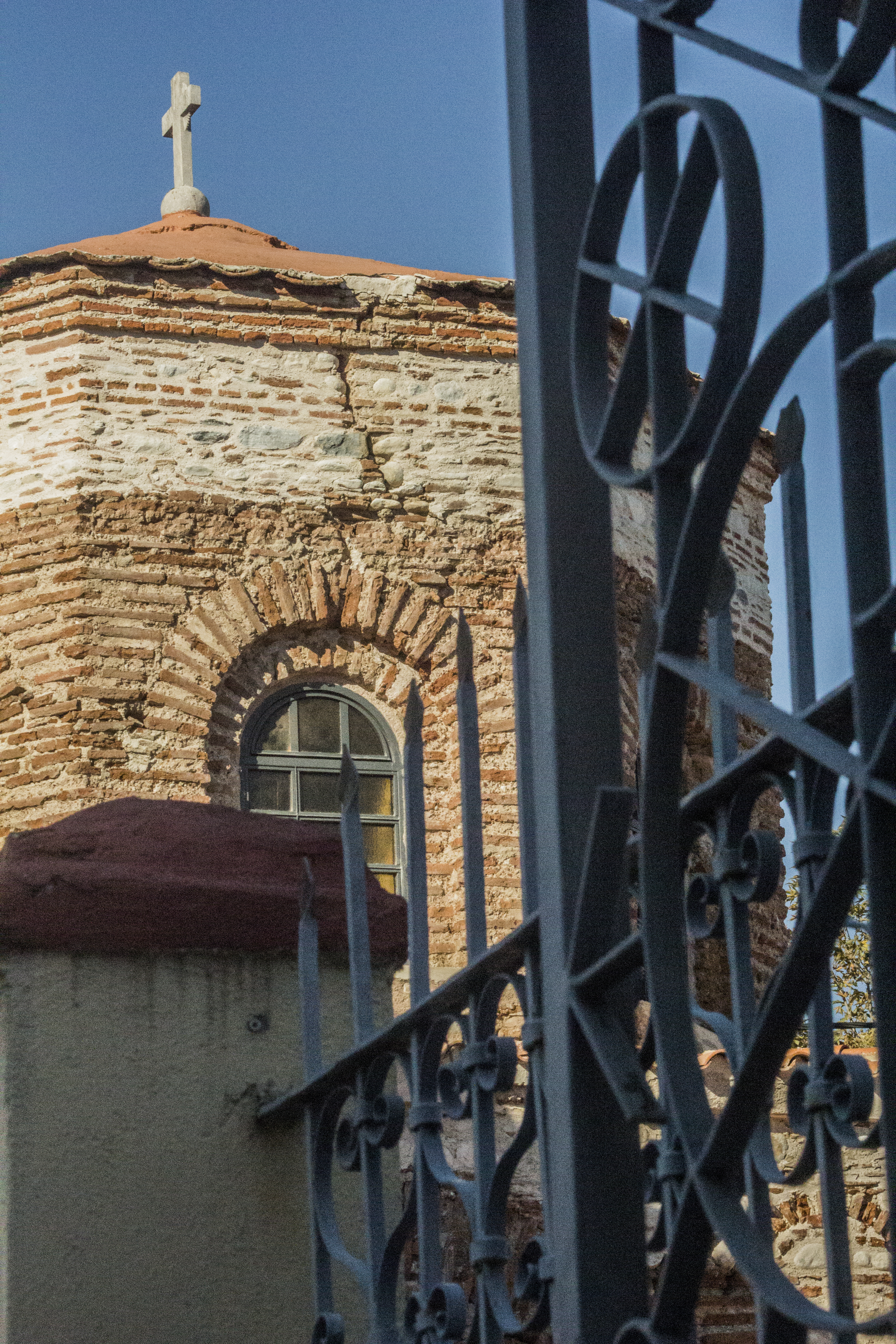
The church.

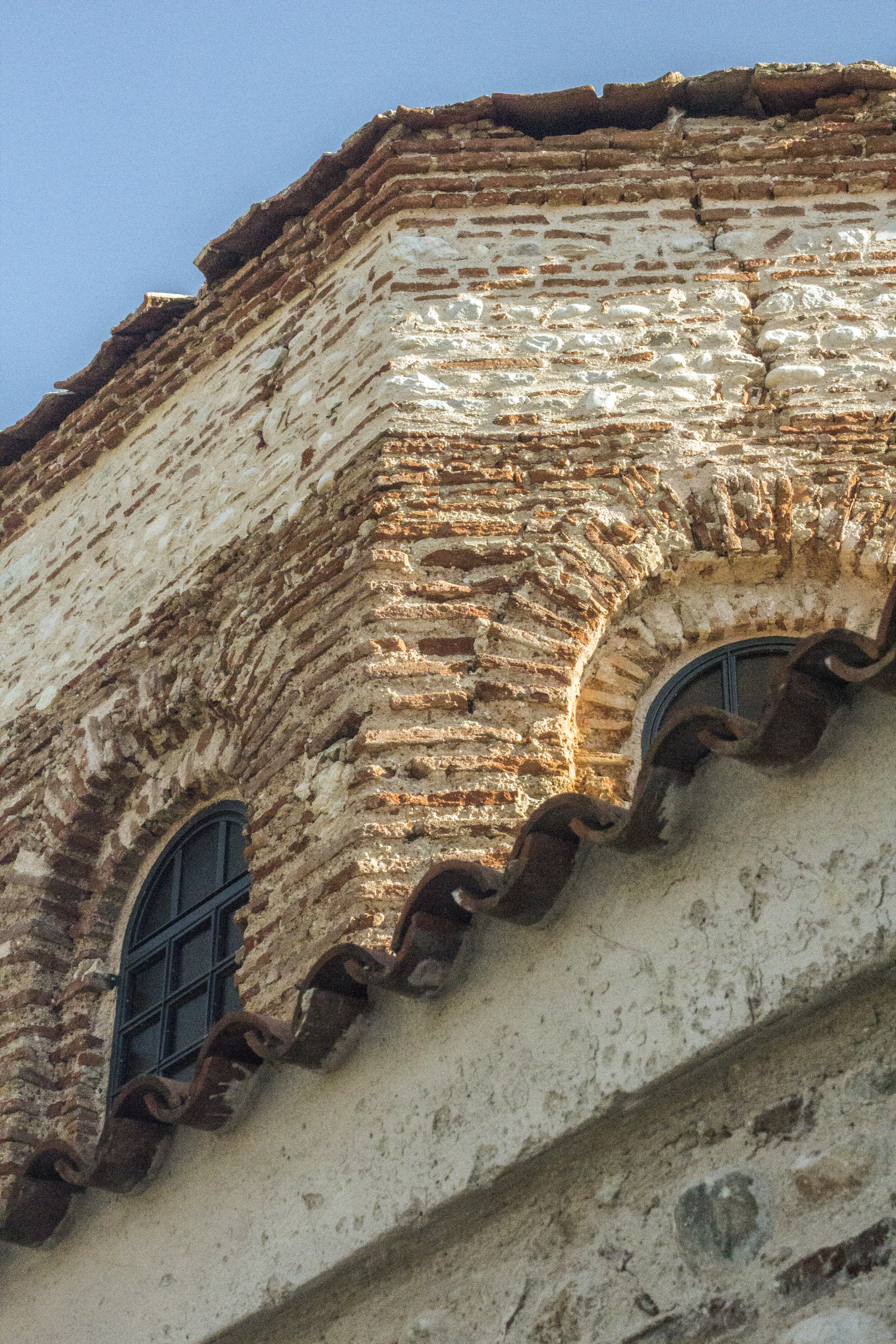
Detail of the dome exterior.

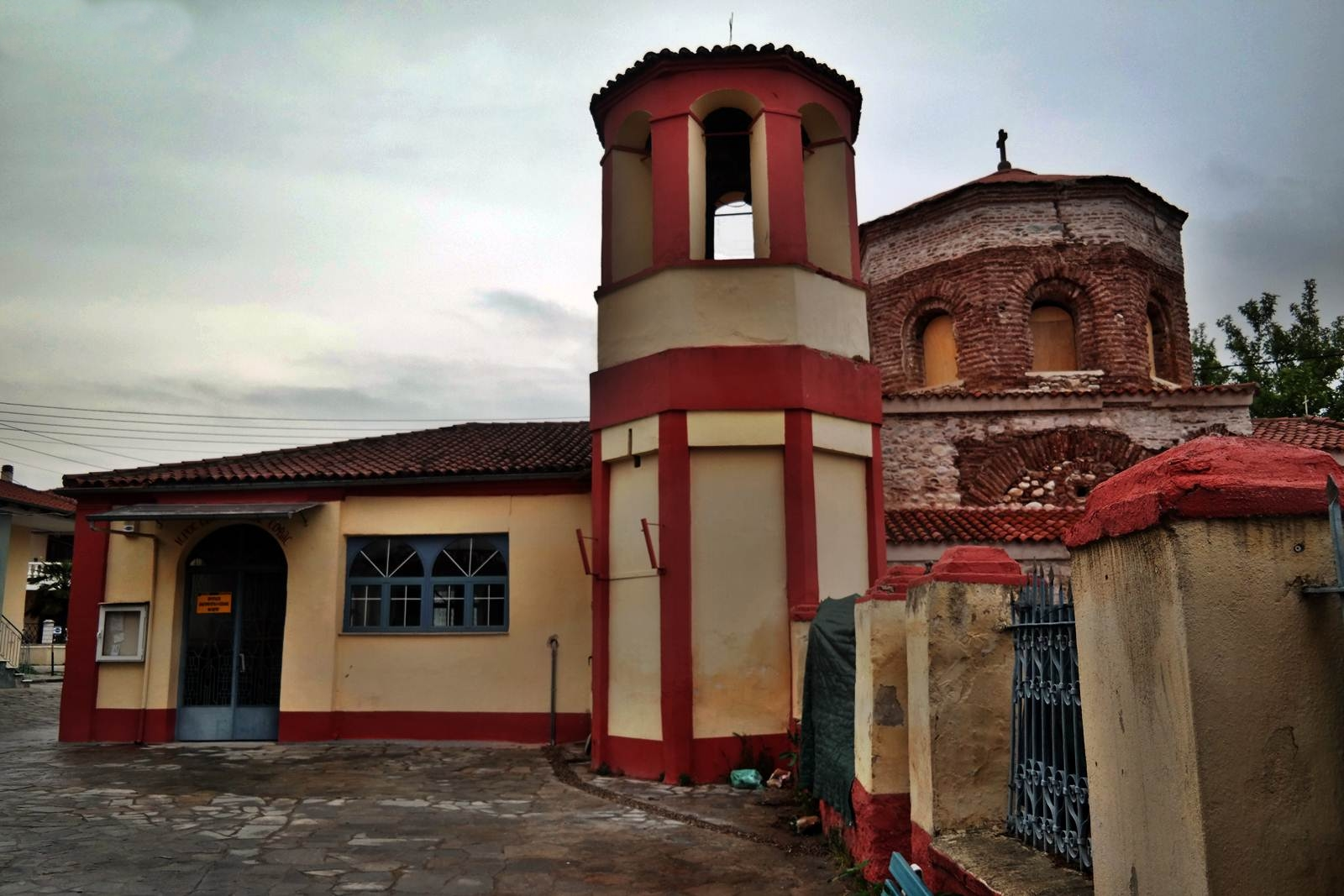
Front view.

== See also ==
- Church of Greece
- Ancient Roman and Byzantine domes
