= Toklu Dede Mosque =

Former mosque in Istanbul, Turkey

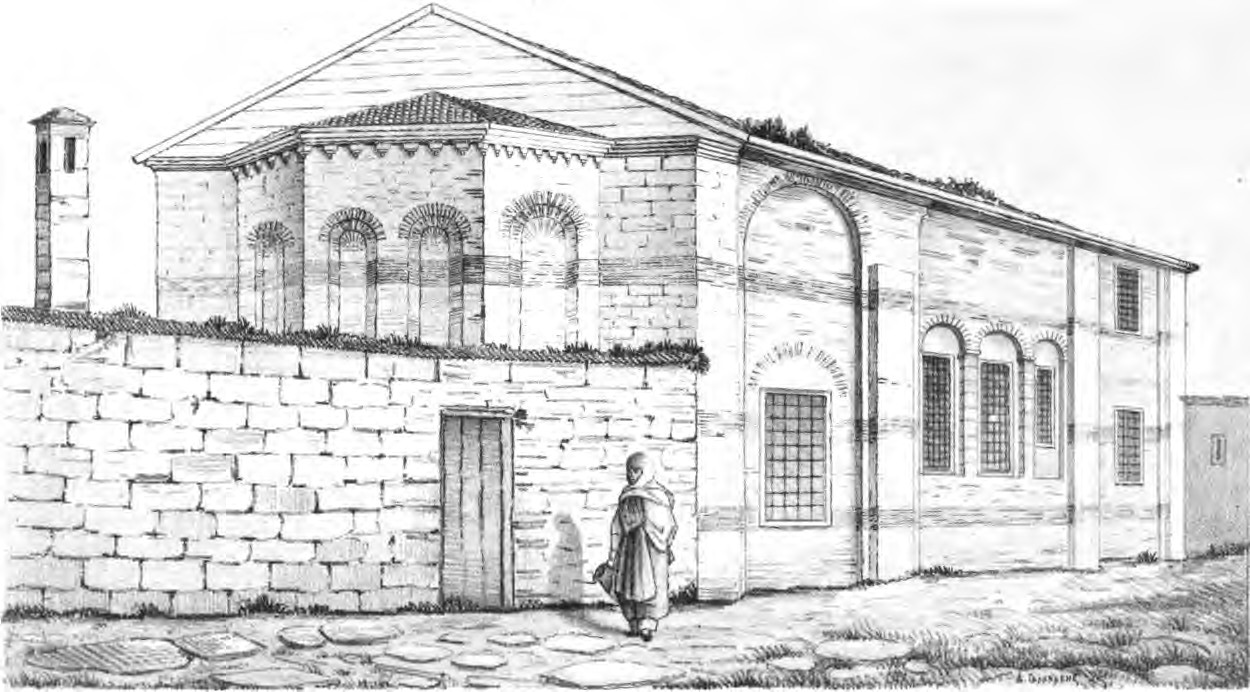

Location
- Location: Istanbul, Turkey
- Interactive map of Toklu Dede Mosque
- Coordinates: 41°02′23″N 28°56′33″E

Architecture
- Type: Mosque
- Style: Byzantine architecture

Toklu Dede Mosque (Turkish: Toklu Dede Mescidi), was an Ottoman mosque in Istanbul, Turkey. The building was originally a Byzantine Eastern Orthodox church of unknown dedication. It was almost completely destroyed in 1929.

== Location ==
The edifice lay in Istanbul, in the district of Fatih, in the neighborhood (Turkish: Mahalle) of Ayvansaray. The only remaining part of the building – the south wall – is enclosed in a modern house at Toklu Ibrahim Dede Sokak, a few meters inside the walled city, a short distance from the shore of the Golden Horn, at the junction between the Blachernae wall and the largely pulled down Golden Horn walls.

=== Byzantine Age ===
The origin of this building, which was erected at the northern foot of the sixth hill of Constantinople in the neighborhood of ta Karianou, part of the Blachernae quarter, is obscure. The small shrine lay on the inner side of the Wall of Heraclius, less than 100 m west of the now demolished Gate of Küçük Ayvansaray (in Greek the Koiliomene Gate) of the Golden Horn Walls, and east of the Gate of Blachernae. The church, – in common with the nearby Atik Mustafa Pasha Mosque, also originally a Byzantine church – has been identified with Saint Thekla of the Palace of Blachernae (Greek: Άγία Θέκλα τοῦ Παλατίου τῶν Βλαχερνών, Hagia Thekla tou Palatiou tōn Vlakhernōn). However, the building lay too far from the Blachernae Palace, so that this identification, based only on the similarity of the name, should be rejected. Stylistically the church belongs to the Komnenian era (middle/second half of the 11th century). At the beginning of the 14th century – in the Palaiologan era – the church underwent minor architectonic changes and its fresco decoration was renewed.

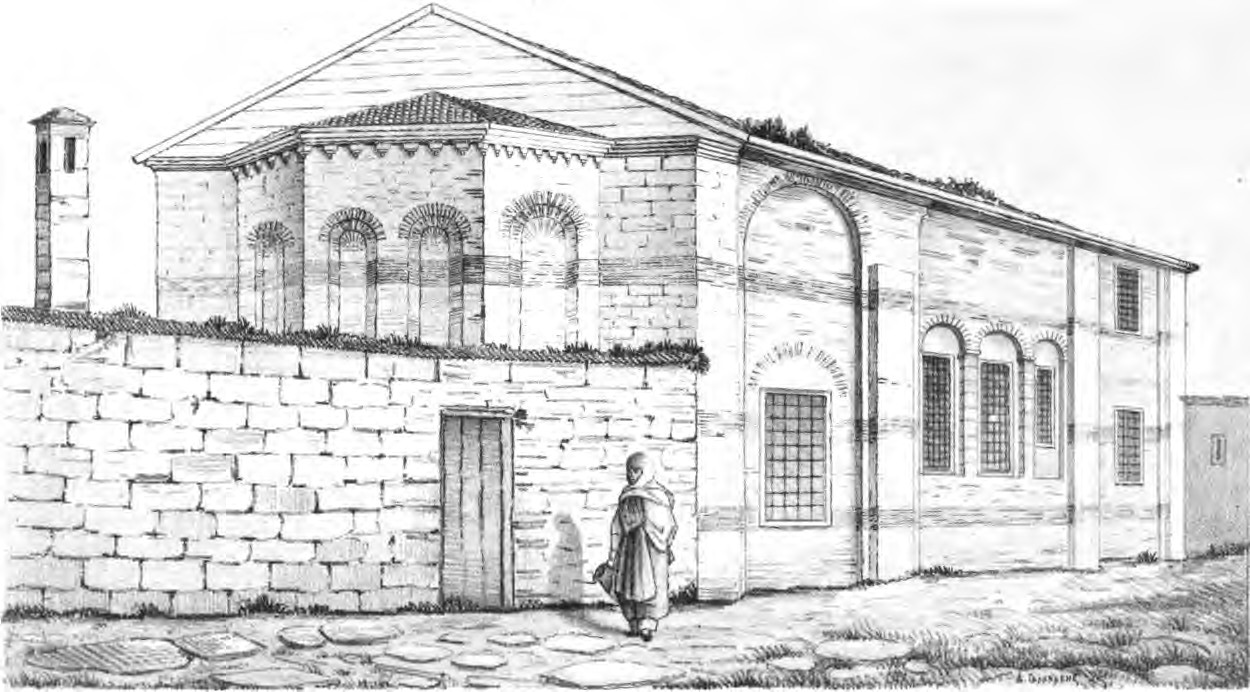
The mosque viewed from northeast in a drawing of 1877, from A.G. Paspates' Byzantine topographical studies

=== Ottoman and Turkish Age ===
After the Fall of Constantinople to the Ottomans in 1453, between the end of the 15th and the beginning of the 16th century the church was converted into a small mosque (Mescid) by Toklu Ibrahim Dede, a former soldier of Mehmed the Conqueror, who was the custodian of the nearby türbe of Ebû Șeybet ül Hudrî, like the more famous Abu Ayyub al-Ansari (the standard bearer of Muhammad), a companion of the Prophet. Both died during the first Arab siege of Constantinople and were buried outside the wall of Heraclius. The türbe of Ebû Șeybet ül Hudrî is now placed in the citadel between the Wall of Heraclius and that of Leo the Armenian.

In 1929 the owner of the building demolished it almost completely, leaving in place only the south wall and the apse. With the demolition the paintings, whose existence was known since 1890, came again to light. The first surveying of the remains occurred in 1954. As of 2012, only the surviving south wall, enclosed in a new building, and the name of the road where it once lay remember the small edifice.

== Description ==
The building had a rectangular plan with external sides of 14.2 m and 6.7 m. A square single nave was surmounted by a barrel vault and covered at its center by a dome with a diameter of about 4 m. This was supported by arches carried by angular piers. The nave was preceded by an esonarthex and ended towards East with a bema and a polygonal apse adorned internally and externally with shallow niches. The plan of the building is similar on a reduced size to that of the Chora Church. The edifice's brickwork consisted of courses of rows of white stones alternating with rows of red bricks. The external wall were divided with half pillars and with lesenes surmounted by arches. The church was decorated with 14th-century frescoes, among them images of the Saints Eleuterus, Abercius, Polykarpos, Spyridon, Procopius and Nicetas, some of them framed in medallions. The barrel vault above the altar was decorated with a fresco representing the Nativity of Jesus.

== Sources ==
- Janin, Raymond (1953). La Géographie Ecclésiastique de l'Empire Byzantin. 1. Part: Le Siège de Constantinople et le Patriarcat Oecuménique. 3rd Vol. : Les Églises et les Monastères (in French). Paris: Institut Français d'Etudes Byzantines.
- Eyice, Semavi (1955). Istanbul. Petite Guide a travers les Monuments Byzantins et Turcs (in French). Istanbul: Istanbul Matbaası.
- Gülersoy, Çelik (1976). A Guide to Istanbul. Istanbul: Istanbul Kitaplığı. OCLC 3849706.
- Müller-Wiener, Wolfgang (1977). Bildlexikon zur Topographie Istanbuls: Byzantion, Konstantinupolis, Istanbul bis zum Beginn d. 17 Jh (in German). Tübingen: Wasmuth. ISBN 9783803010223.
- Krautheimer, Richard (1986). Architettura paleocristiana e bizantina (in Italian). Turin: Einaudi. ISBN 88-06-59261-0.
- Ousterhout, Robert G. (1987). The Architecture of the Kariye Camii in Istanbul. Washington D.C.: Dumbarton Oaks. ISBN 0-88402-165-3.
