= Tarsus Old Mosque =

Mosque in Mersin, Turkey

Old Mosque Church Mosque
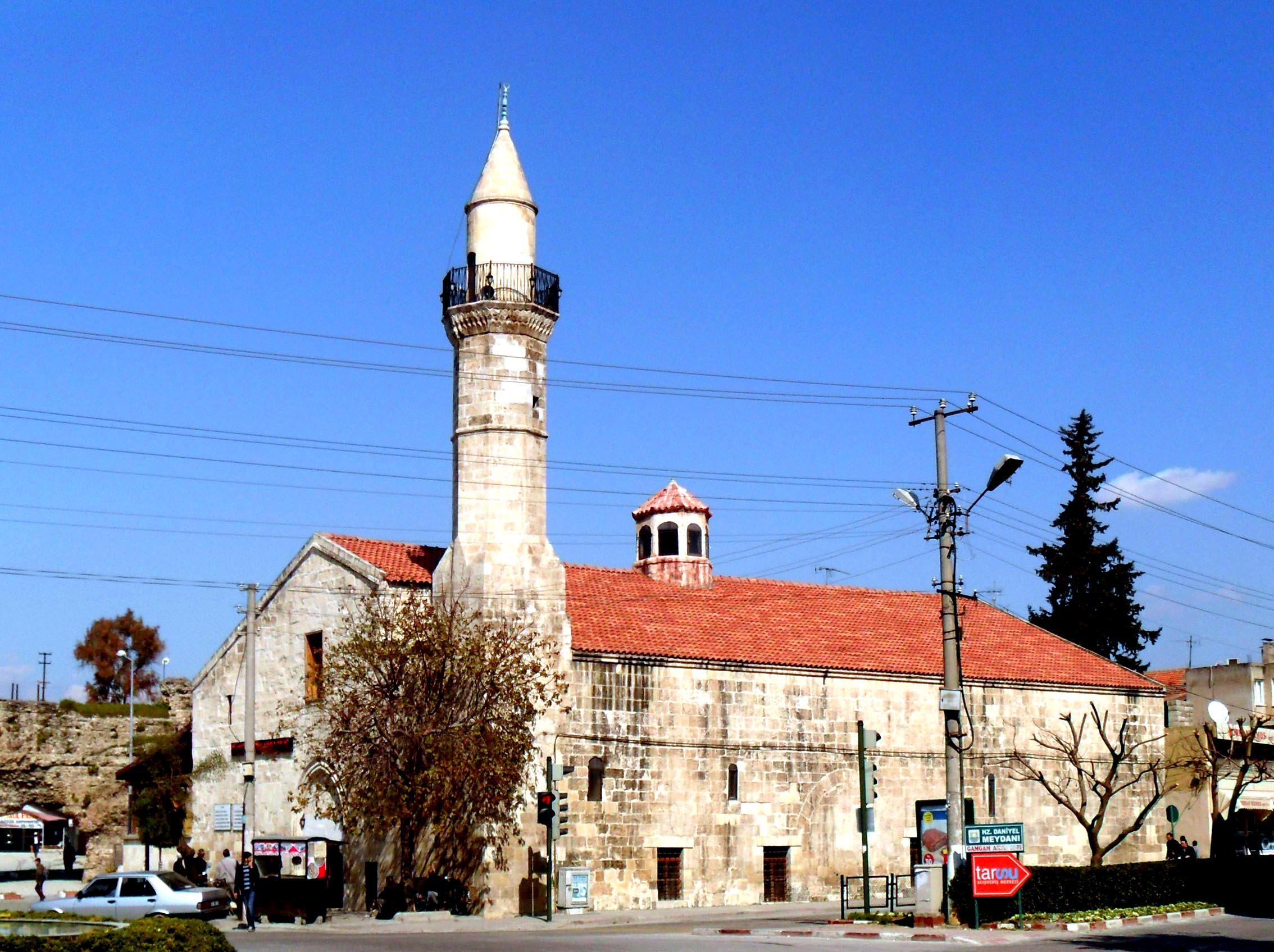

Religion
- Affiliation: Islam
- District: Tarsus
- Province: Mersin Province
- Region: Mediterranean Region
- Rite: Sunni Islam
- Status: Active

Location
- Location: Mersin, Turkey
- Interactive map of Old Mosque; Church Mosque
- Coordinates: 36°55′04″N 34°53′52″E

Architecture
- Type: Mosque (converted from church)
- Completed: Church 1102; Mosque 1415

Specifications
- Width (nave): 12,6 m.
- Minaret: 1

The Church Mosque (Turkish: Cami-i Kilise) or Old Mosque (Turkish: Eski camii) is a mosque converted from a historic church that was built in 1102. It is located in Tarsus ilçe of Mersin Province, southern Turkey.

== Geography ==
The mosque is in the urban fabric of Tarsus. It is on the main road of Tarsus.

== History ==
The mosque was built as a church. The name of the church was probably "Saint Paul Cathedral" honoring Paul the Apostle, who was a resident of Tarsus. (not to be confused with Saint Paul's Church, Tarsus). It was built in 1102, during the late Byzantine period when the city was captured by the First Crusade from the Seljuk Turks.

In 1359, Tarsus fell to Ramazanids, a Turkmen dynasty, and in 1415 Ahmet of Ramazanids (reigned 1383–1416) converted the church into a mosque.

== The building ==
The total area of the (building and the yard) is 460 square metres (5,000 sq ft). The inner dimensions of the building is 19.3 m × 17.5 m (63 ft × 57 ft). The width of the nave is 12.6 m (41 ft).

There are blind arches in the facade of the mosque. The main gate is to the west. There are two plaster half columns in the entrance, and also half columns on the southern and northern walls of the nave, which are made of granite, and thought to have been constructed with the gathered material of the former buildings. On the ceiling, Jesus and four of his apostles are depicted in frescoes. There is a belfry in the northeast corner of the building.
