= Church of St. Nicholas, Chania =

Orthodox church in Crete, Greece

Church of Saint Nicholas
- Saint Nicholas' Church
- Ιερός Ναός Αγίου Νικολάου
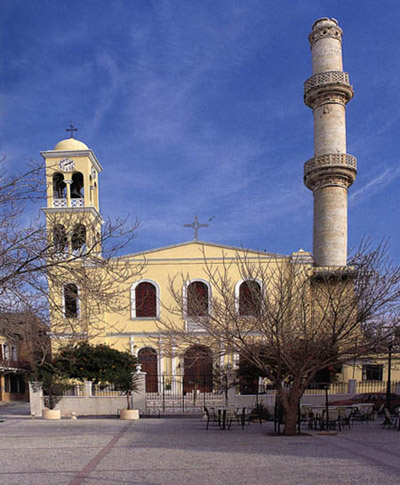
- The church of Saint Nicholas

- Location of the church on Crete
- Church of Saint Nicholas
- 35°30′59″N 24°01′20″E
- Location: Chania, Crete
- Country: Greece
- Language: Greek
- Denomination: Greek Orthodox
- Previous denomination: Roman Catholic (1320–1645); Islam (1645–1912)
- Religious institute: Dominican (1320–1645)
- Website: orthodoxcrete.com/el/places/saint-nicholas-church-splantzia-square/ (in Greek)

History
- Former name: Hünkar Mosque (as a mosque)
- Status: Cathedral (1320–1645); Mosque (1645–1912); Church (since 1918– )
- Dedication: Saint Nicholas

Architecture
- Functional status: Active
- Architectural type: Basilica
- Style: Byzantine
- Completed: 1320 (as a cathedral); 1645 (as a mosque); 1918 (as a church)

Specifications
- Height: 36 m (118 ft)

Administration
- Archdiocese: Crete (since 1918– )

The Church of Saint Nicholas (Greek: Ιερός Ναός Αγίου Νικολάου, romanized: Agios Nikolaos) is a Greek Orthodox church located in the Splanzia square in the town of Chania, on the island of Crete, Greece. It is dedicated to Saint Nicholas. Originally a Roman Catholic church, it was converted into a mosque during the Ottoman period and then back into a church in the twentieth century. It is the only building in Greece to possess both a bell tower and a minaret.

== History ==
The church was built around 1320 by the Dominican brotherhood of Candia as a Roman Catholic cathedral. When Crete fell to the Ottoman Turks in the seventeenth century, the church was converted into a mosque known as the Hünkar Mosque (“Emperor’s Mosque”), in honour of the Sultan of the Ottoman Empire, Imbraim. Accordingly, Splanzia became the Muslim quarter of the town.

In the mosque was kept the sacred sword of the Turkish Dervish, who first entered the city, climbed the bell tower and with the sword circled the four points of the horizon calling the faithful to prayer with the phrase: "There is only one God and his prophet is Muhammad".

Throughout the period of the Turkish rule and up to 1912 when Crete was annexed by the Kingdom of Greece, the Dervish sword remained in the Saint Nicholas' Church until the exchange of Muslim and Christian populations between Turkey and Greece in 1923, when the Muslim population had to depart Crete and took it with them.

In 1918 the mosque was consecrated as an Orthodox church.

== Architecture ==
The Church of Saint Nicholas of the Dominicans is a basilica.

The original bell tower of Saint Nicholas was located in the northeast of the church, but it did not survive and had to be rebuilt. To the west of the church is the atrium of the enclosed courtyard of the church, which served as a cemetery for nobles during both the Venetian and Turkish periods.

For the conversion of the Catholic church into an Islamic mosque in 1645, the necessary additions of the mihrab, the minbar and the minaret were made. It was the most important mosque of Chania and its minaret stood out due to its two balconies.

The minaret of Hünkar Mosque was built in contact with the southern side of the building and facing its western end; the western side of the minaret was built in contact with a pre-existing two-storey building of the monastery which was demolished some time later. The minaret is cylindrical and is of the classical Ottoman style. The current height of the minaret is approximately 36 metres (118 ft) tall, while together with the conical roof (which is no longer preserved) it would have exceeded 40 metres (130 ft).

== Gallery ==
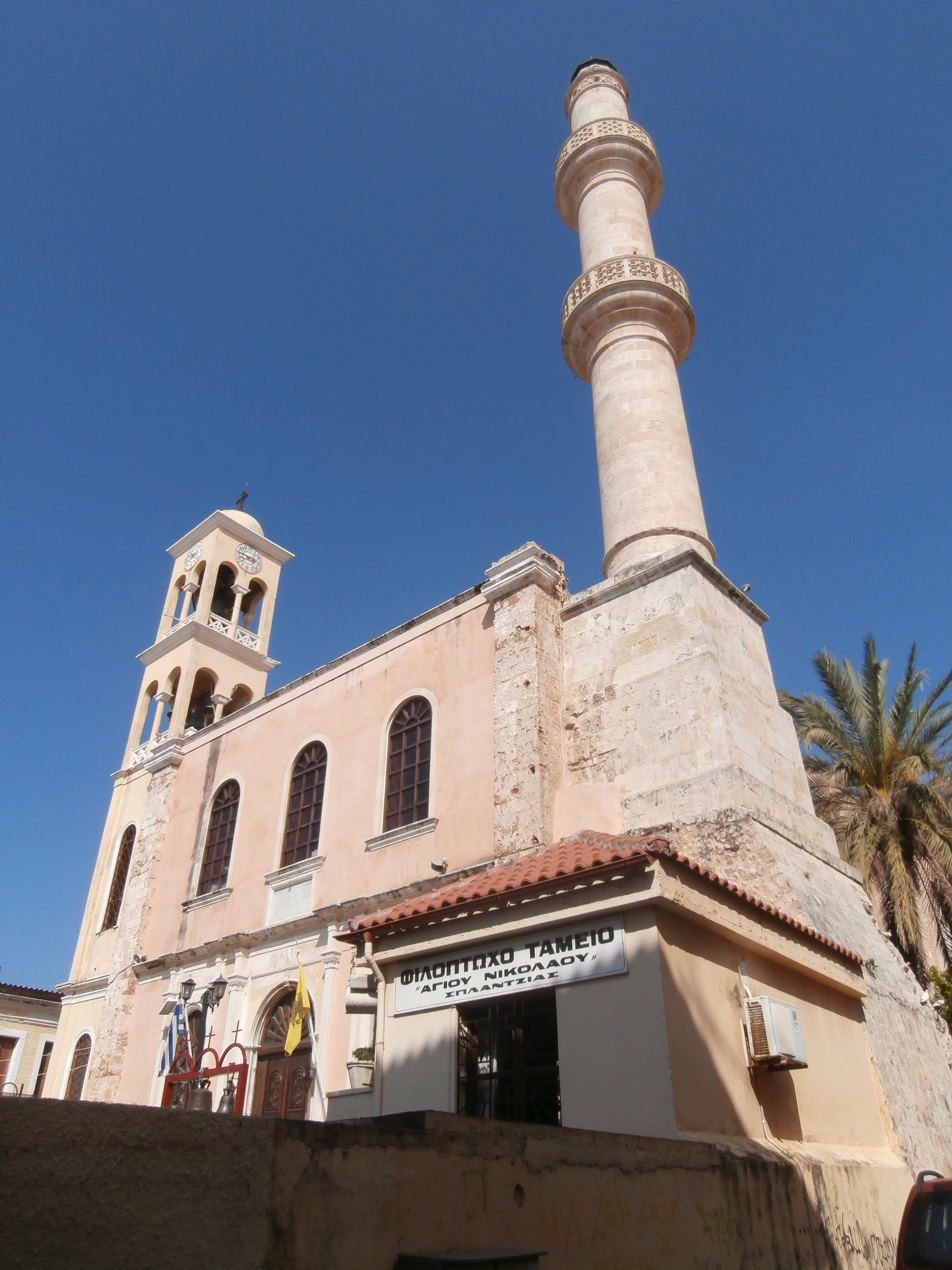
Lower angle

Interior

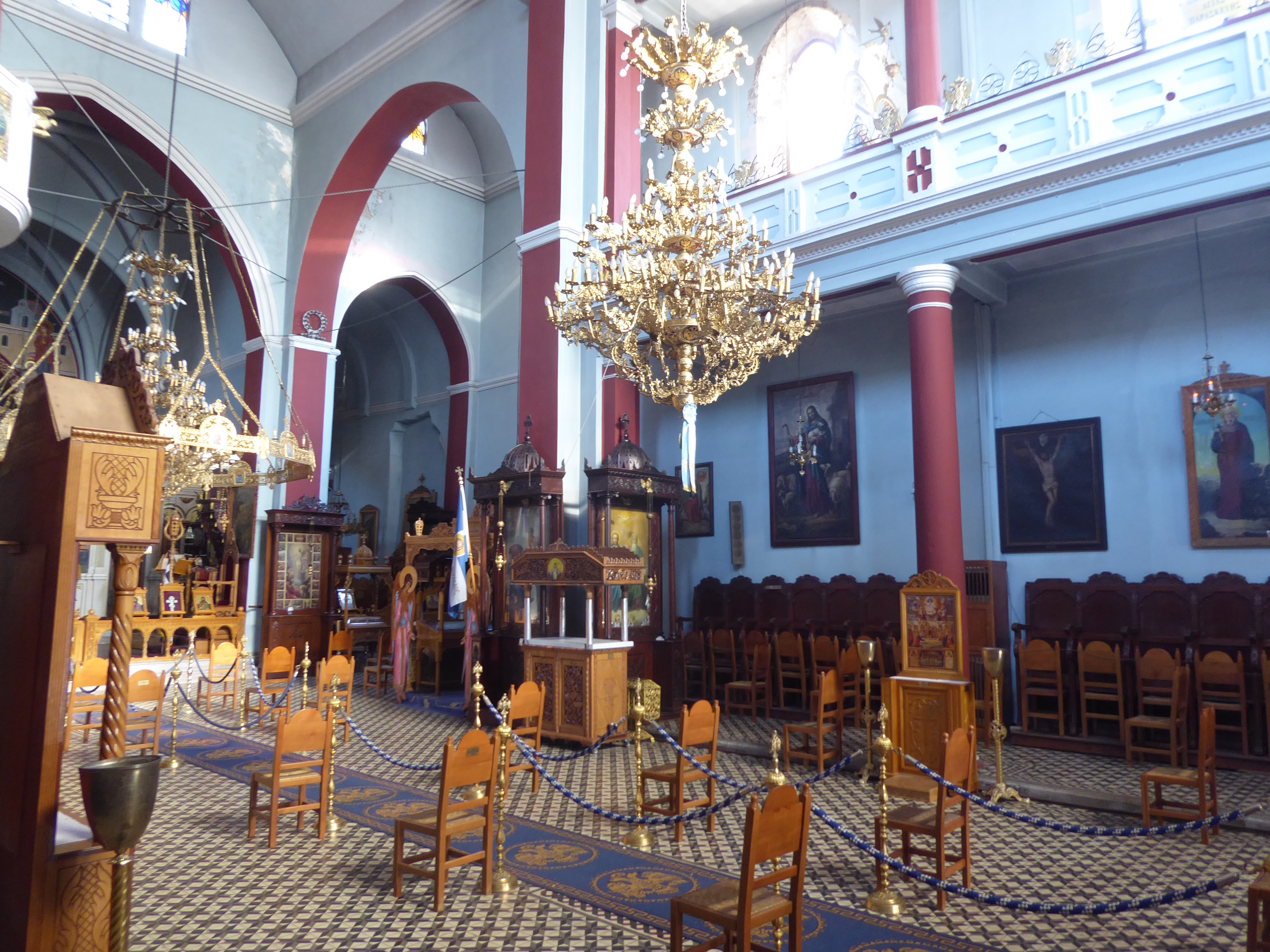
Interior

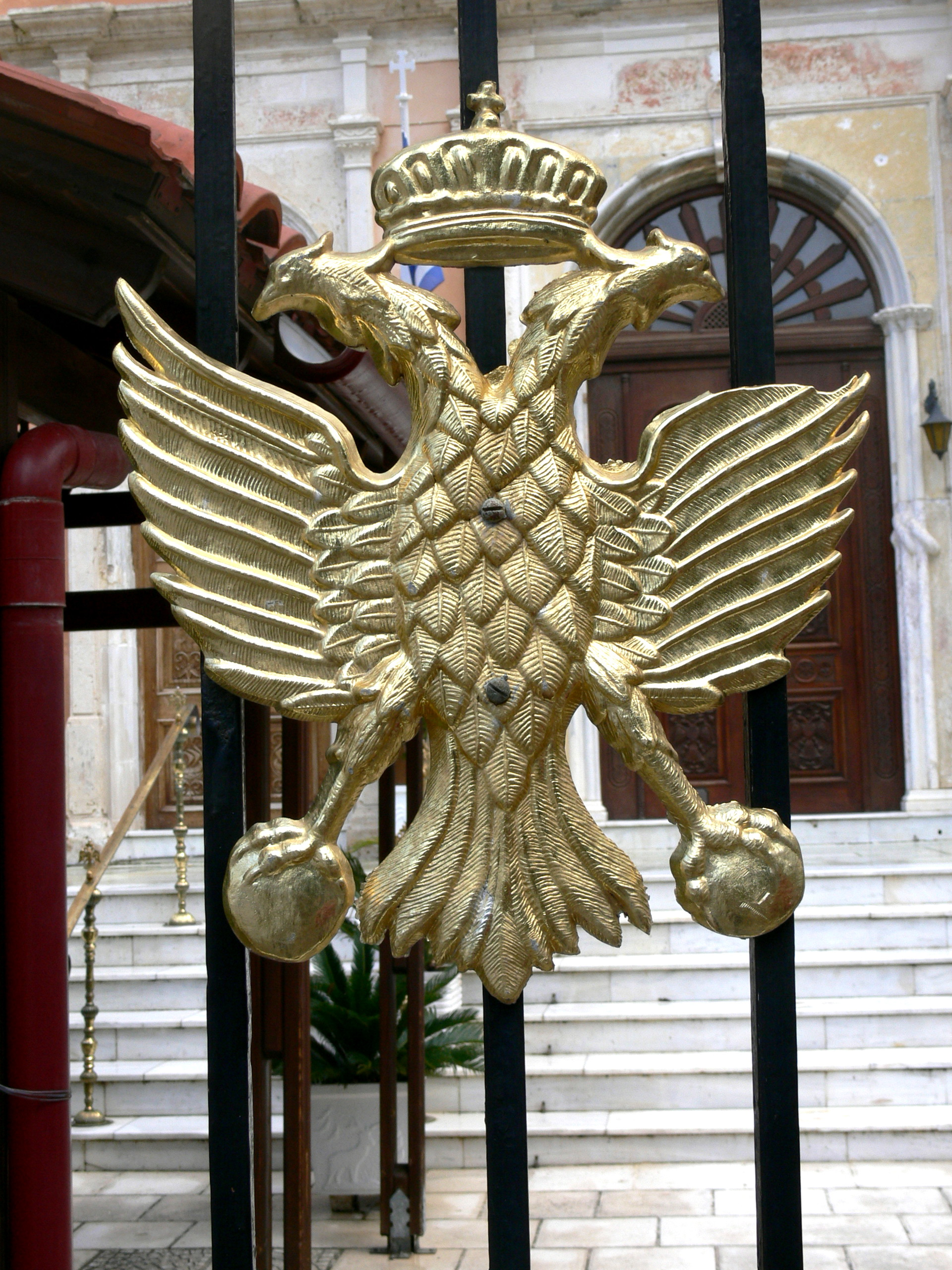
Byzantine coat of arms

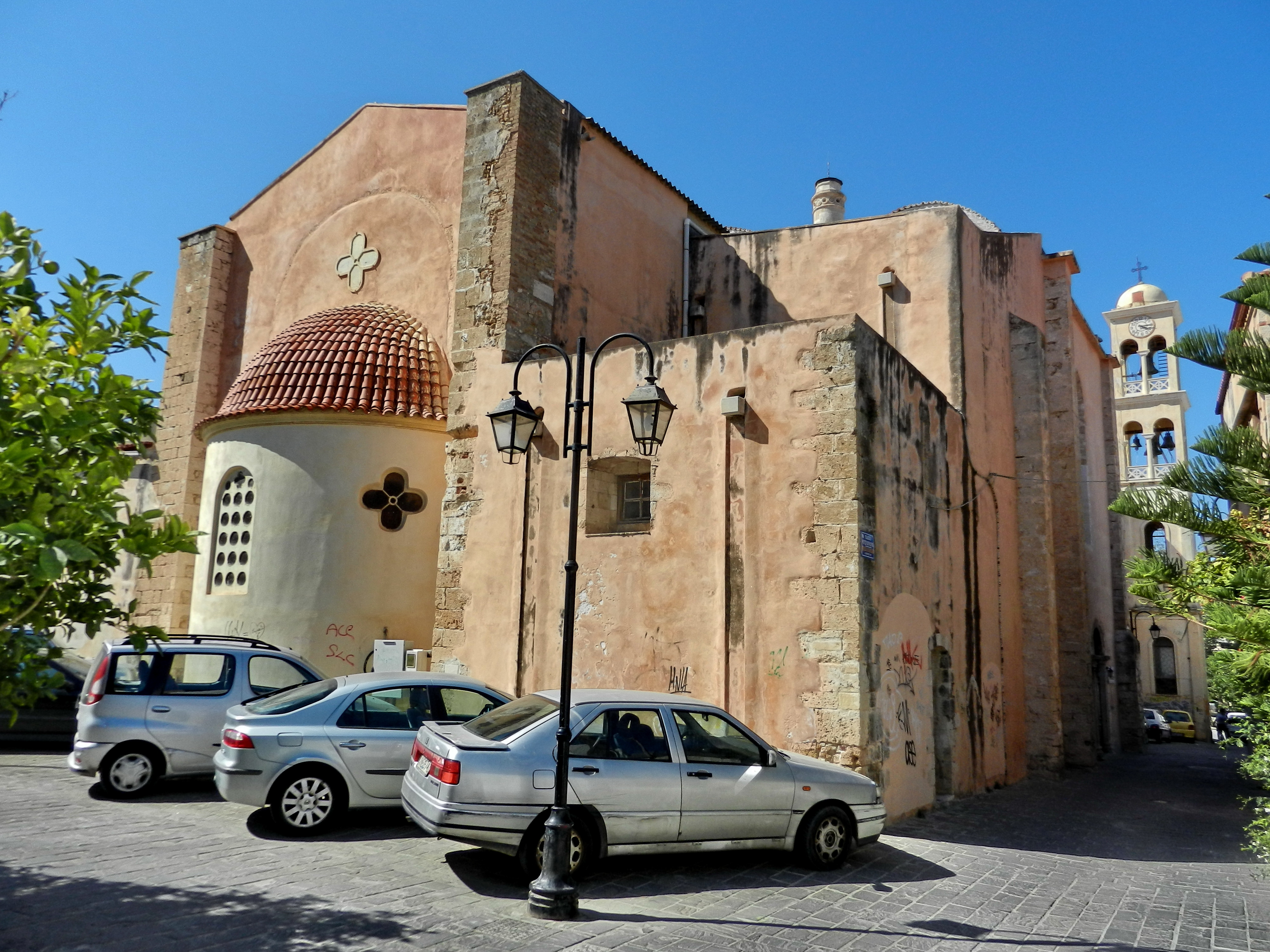
Rear view

== See also ==
- Catholic Church in Greece
- Church of Crete
- List of former mosques in Greece
- Ottoman Crete
