= Kesik Minare =

Structure in Kaleiçi (Old Antalya) in southern Turkey

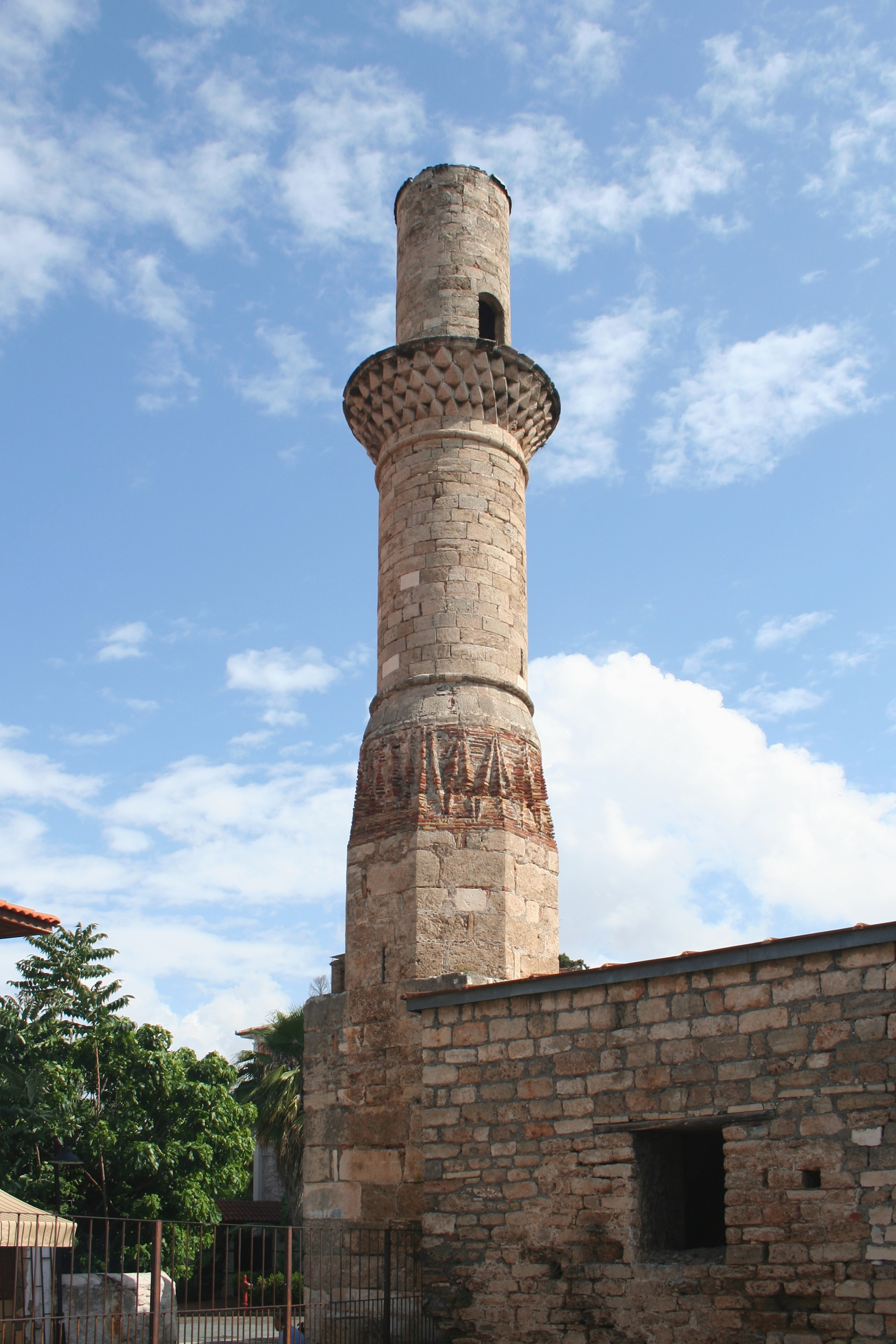
Kesik Minare

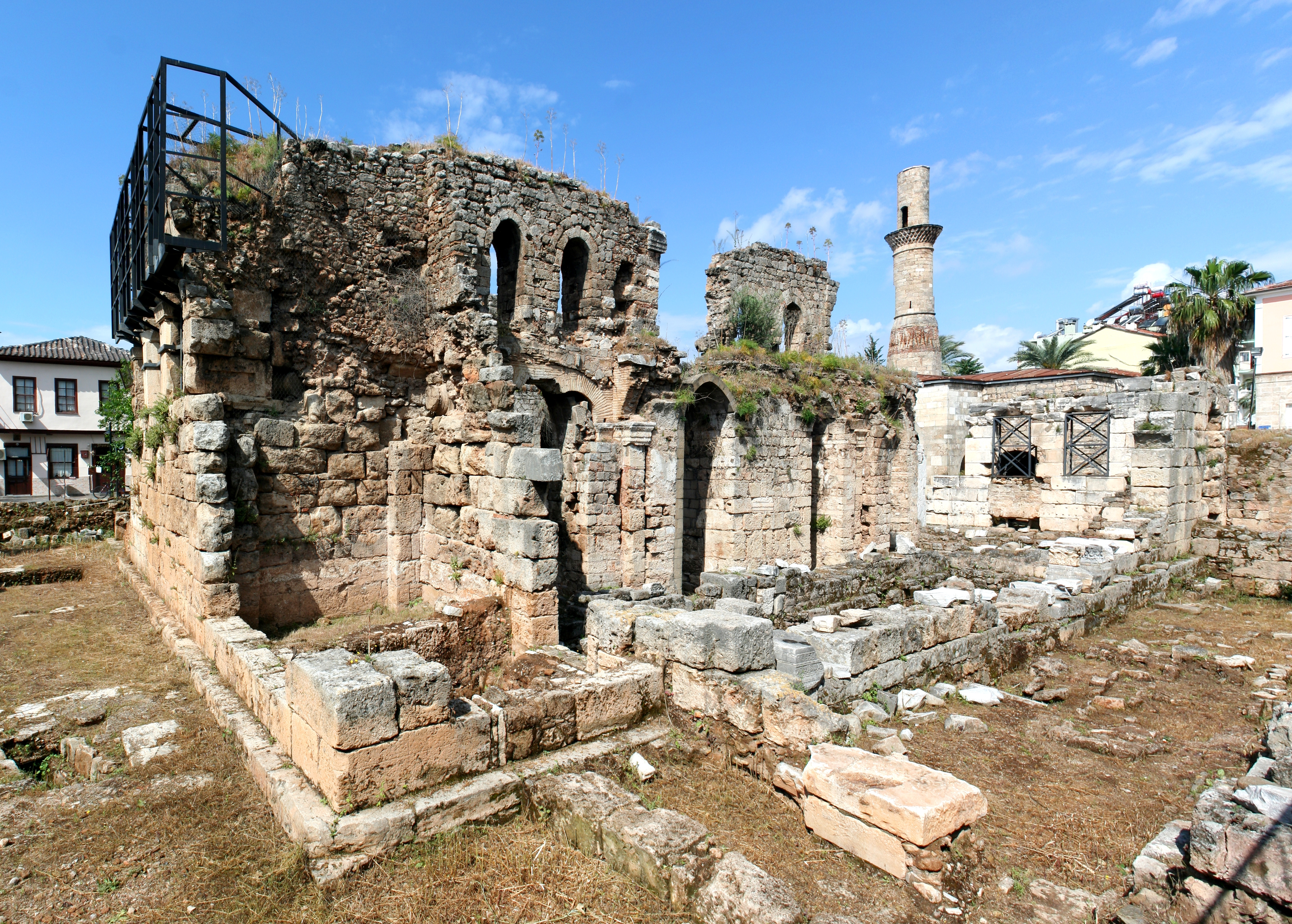
Ruins of the mosque prior to its restoration

The Kesik Minare Cami (Broken Minaret Mosque), Korkut Cami or Cumanın Cami standing in the streets of Kaleiçi (Old Antalya) in southern Turkey, was originally built as a Roman temple in the 2nd century AD. In the 7th century, it was converted into a Byzantine church in honor of the Virgin Mary, but it was heavily damaged in the 7th century during the Arab invasions. In the 9th century it was repaired again. The minaret was added in the early 13th century when the Sultanate of Rum established their rule in Antalya and converted the church into a mosque. In 1361, when the crusader king of Cyprus took Antalya from the Seljuks, it was consecrated a church again, only to become a mosque once more during the rule of Şehzade Korkut, son of the Ottoman sultan Bayezid II. The main building was destroyed in a fire in 1896, but the surviving minaret, located today on Kaleiçi Hesapçi Street, is known as the Kesik Minare.

Restoration work began in 2018. In 2019 the top cone and roof were restored. The structure officially reopened as a mosque in 2021 on 5 March, the day Antalya was conquered by the Seljuk Empire. It welcomed worshippers for the first time in nearly 125 years.
