= Millingen =

Millingen or van Millingen is a surname, and may refer to:

- Alexander van Millingen (1840–1915), scholar
- Evelina van Millingen (1831–1900), hostess, cultivator of gardens, and novelist
- James Millingen (1774–1845), Dutch-English archaeologist
- John G. Millingen (1782–1862), British army surgeon and author
- Julius Michael Millingen (1800–1878), English physician and writer

== See also ==
- Millingen aan de Rijn
