= John Obadiah Justamond =

John Obadiah Justamond (1737–1786) was an Anglo-French surgeon and writer.

== Life ==
Justamond was a Huguenot, and acted as surgeon to Westminster Hospital from 1770, having begun at the Middlesex Hospital in 1754 as a surgical pupil. At the Westminster he had a reputation as a reformer, and for palliation and cures of cancers. Justamond also acted as surgeon to the 2nd Regiment of the Dragoon Guards. He was a Fellow of the Royal Society.

Justamond was also employed by the British Museum as a deputy keeper, a locum for Daniel Solander. His connection to the Museum was as son-in-law to Matthew Maty: he had married Maty's daughter Elizabeth. Shortly after Maty died he fell into debt, and lost his museum position of Assistant Librarian in 1778, being replaced by Edward Whitaker Gray.

== Works ==
Most of Justamond's works were medical. Notes on chirurgical cases, and observations (1773) was an anonymous attack on William Bromfield and his Chirurgical Cases and Observations of the same year. His cancer cures and case notes, including use of arsenic internally and externally, passed into the literature. Fleetwood Churchill notes other remedies of his for uterine cancer. Thomas Spencer Wells wrote in 1860 that Justamond had anticipated cancer cures then recently in fashion in London.

Two of his best-known works were translations:

- Philosophical and Political History of the Settlements and Trade of Europeans in the East and West Indies (5 vols. 1776), translation from Abbé Raynal, Histoire Politique des Deux Indes.
- Private Life of Louis XV (4 vols., 1781), translation from Mouffle d'Angerville.

The translation from Raynal was from the second French edition (1774). Justamond had an assistant on it, as reported by Joan Gideon Loten; and the assistant has tentatively been identified as the father of John Gideon Millingen, Michiel Van Millingen. Justamond and a brother were prosperous after its publication, but also ran up debts. It was quite widely noticed, with The Critical Review and Monthly Review approving of Justamond's work, while the Edinburgh Magazine and Review found it insipid and scolded the author. The book was topical, in the year of the American Revolution, because Raynal commented on the grievances of the American colonists that were being raised against the British government. In 1775 the Philadelphia printer James Humphreys had printed translated extracts from Raynal's work as the pamphlet The Sentiments of a Foreigner, on the Disputes of Great-Britain with America. A Philosophical and Political History of the British Settlements and Trade in North America (Edinburgh, 1779) was a part of Justamond's translation. Israel, who devotes a chapter to the Histoire Philosophique, refers to a 1776 Edinburgh edition under this title: at least one Edinburgh edition was a pirate version. The coverage of the American colonies was eulogistic about Pennsylvania, less so in the cases of New England and Virginia.

Justamond wrote for the English Review. He also completed the edition of the Works of Lord Chesterfield, begun by Maty. He commented on the Ciceronian manner of two of Chesterfield's political speeches, not knowing that the author was Samuel Johnson.
