= Frederick van Millingen =

Ottoman Army officer and writer (1836–1901)

- Born: 1836; Istanbul, Ottoman Empire
- Died: 1901 (aged 64–65); Nice, France
- Occupations: Army officer, essayist, writer

Frederick van Millingen (1836 – 1901) was an Ottoman Army officer and writer. Born in Istanbul, he took the name Osman Bey and served in the Ottoman army for several years. He later took the name Vladimir Andreevich and converted to Russian Orthodox Christianity. Frederick van Millingen is most notorious for being the author of The Conquest of the World by the Jews, an antisemitic work first published in 1873.

== Life and career ==
Frederick van Millingen was born in 1836 in Istanbul, as the first son of Julius Michael Millingen, one of the personal physicians of Lord Byron, and his first wife Marie Dejean. He was the couple's second child after Frederick's sister Evelina van Millingen. Through his father, Frederick was also the grandson of noted English numismatist James Millingen, who was of Dutch-Jewish descent.

Frederick van Millingen maintained poor relations with the rest of his family, and soon joined the Ottoman Army after converting to Islam and taking on the name of Osman Bey. He was in the Ottoman service 1853 to 1864, but clashed with Fuad Pasha. Afterwards, Millingen led a life of wandering in Europe, attacking the English, his father, the Jews, the Armenians, and others. He is the author of several books written in French, English or Italian, with his books in German being translations.

Contrary to what Norman Cohn claimed (Warrant for genocide, the myth of the Jewish world-conspiracy and the Protocols of the Elders of Zion, London, 1967, p. 61), undoubtedly due to having incomplete information at the time, Millingen (and not "Millinger") was neither Jewish nor Serbian, but of British nationality (a nationality which he never disowned) and perhaps also Ottoman. His family was strongly committed to Presbyterianism. He eventually relocated to Russia and converted to Russian Orthodox Christianity, taking on the name of Vladimir Andreevich. Another name he used at some point was Kibrizli-Zade (Turkish: Cypriot-Born or Cypriot-Noble).

== Antisemitic writings ==
While many of his works pertain to the Ottoman Empire and Qajar Iran, Frederick van Millingen is most well known for being the author of The Conquest of the World by the Jews (in the original French: La conquête du monde par les Juifs), an antisemitic work first published in 1873 in Basel. In it, he criticized supposed Jewish plots for world domination centered around the Alliance Israélite Universelle, and considered the Jews to be responsible, directly or indirectly, for events such as the French Revolution. He also maintained that Freemasonry was controlled by Judaism (an early example of the Judeo-Masonic conspiracy theory).

The book was successful in Europe, and reached its seventh edition in 1875. It was first translated into English in 1878, and would be translated into many languages: German, Russian, Greek, English, Danish, Italian, and often republished. In 1886, while in Russian service, he wrote an essay, called by Walter Ze'ev Laqueur "one of the most remarkable books ever written outside a lunatic asylum", outlining several conspiracy theories regarding the assassination of Tsar Alexander II of Russia.

Norman Cohn and Cesare G. De Michelis see this book as a precursor to the famous anti-Semitic pamphlet The Protocols of the Elders of Zion. His work also influenced another late 19th century antisemitic writer, Hippolytus Lutostansky, who published the conspiratorial work The Talmud and the Jews in 1879, detailing a plan by Jews to divide Russia among themselves. Thus, alongside Lutostansky and Hermann Goedsche, Millingen was one of the first European writers to popularize the idea of an "international Jewish conspiracy" in Europe.

== Works ==
In French:

- Les Femmes en Turquie (Paris, 1878)
- La Turquie sous la règne d'Abdul-Aziz (Bruxelles et Paris, 1868)
- La Conquête du monde par les Juifs (Bâle, 1873, rééd. 1887)
- Les Anglais en Orient, 1830–1876 : vraie version de "Trente ans au harem" (Paris, 1877)
- Les Imams et les derviches (Paris, 1881)
- Révélations sur l'assassinat d'Alexandre II (Genève, 1886)
- Les Russes en 1877–78 (guerre d'Orient) (Berlin, 1889)

In English:

- "On the Koords", in Journal of the Ethnological Society of London, 1870, p. 175–181
- Wild life among the Koords (London, 1870)
- Sin and its victims: a tragedy in the East (Vienna, 1871, 1st version, confidential, of Les Anglais en Orient )
- The Conquest of the world by the Jews: an historical and ethnic essay by Major Osman Bey, revised and translated by FW Mathias (St. Louis, 1878)

In Italian:

- The Genius of Islam – Il genio dell'islamismo (Turin, 1890)

In German:

- Die Eroberung der Welt durch die Juden : Versuch nach Geschichte und Gegenwart (Basel, 1873)
- Enthüllungen über die Ermordung Alexanders II (Berne, 1886)

== Trivia ==
Frederick van Millingen appears as a minor character in Umberto Eco's novel The Cemetery of Prague.
