= Atik Mustafa Pasha Mosque =

Mosque in Istanbul, Turkey

Atik Mustafa Pasha Mosque Atik Mustafa Paşa Camii
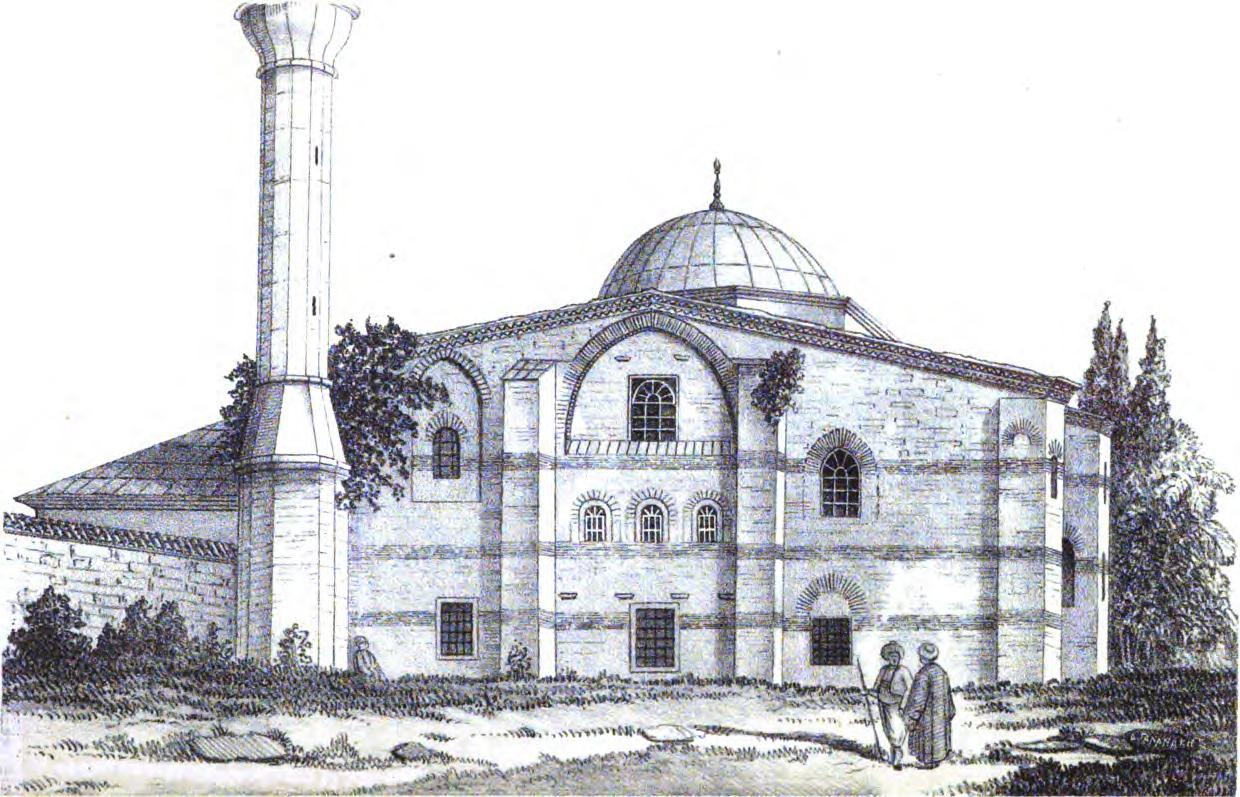
- The mosque viewed from southeast in a drawing of 1877, from A.G. Paspates' Byzantine topographical studies

- Location in the Fatih district of Istanbul

Religion
- Affiliation: Sunni Islam
- Year consecrated: Between 1509 and 1512

Location
- Location: Istanbul, Turkey
- Coordinates: 41°02′18.96″N 28°56′38.40″E

Architecture
- Type: church with Greek cross plan
- Style: Byzantine
- Completed: 1059

Specifications
- Minaret: 1
- Materials: brick, stone

Atik Mustafa Pasha Mosque (Turkish: Atik Mustafa Paşa Camii; more commonly known as Hazreti Cabir Camii) is a former Eastern Orthodox church in Istanbul, converted into a mosque by the Ottomans. In Çember Sokak in the neighbourhood of Ayvansaray, in the district of Fatih, Istanbul, it lies just inside the walled city at a short distance from the Golden Horn, at the foot of the sixth hill of Constantinople.

The dedication of the church is obscure. For a long time it has been identified with the church of Saints Peter and Mark, but without any proof. Now it seems more probable that the church is to be identified with Saint Thekla of the Palace of Blachernae (Greek: Άγία Θέκλα τοῦ Παλατίου τῶν Βλαχερνών, Hagia Thekla tou Palatiou tōn Vlakhernōn). Stylistically, it belongs to the eleventh or twelfth century.

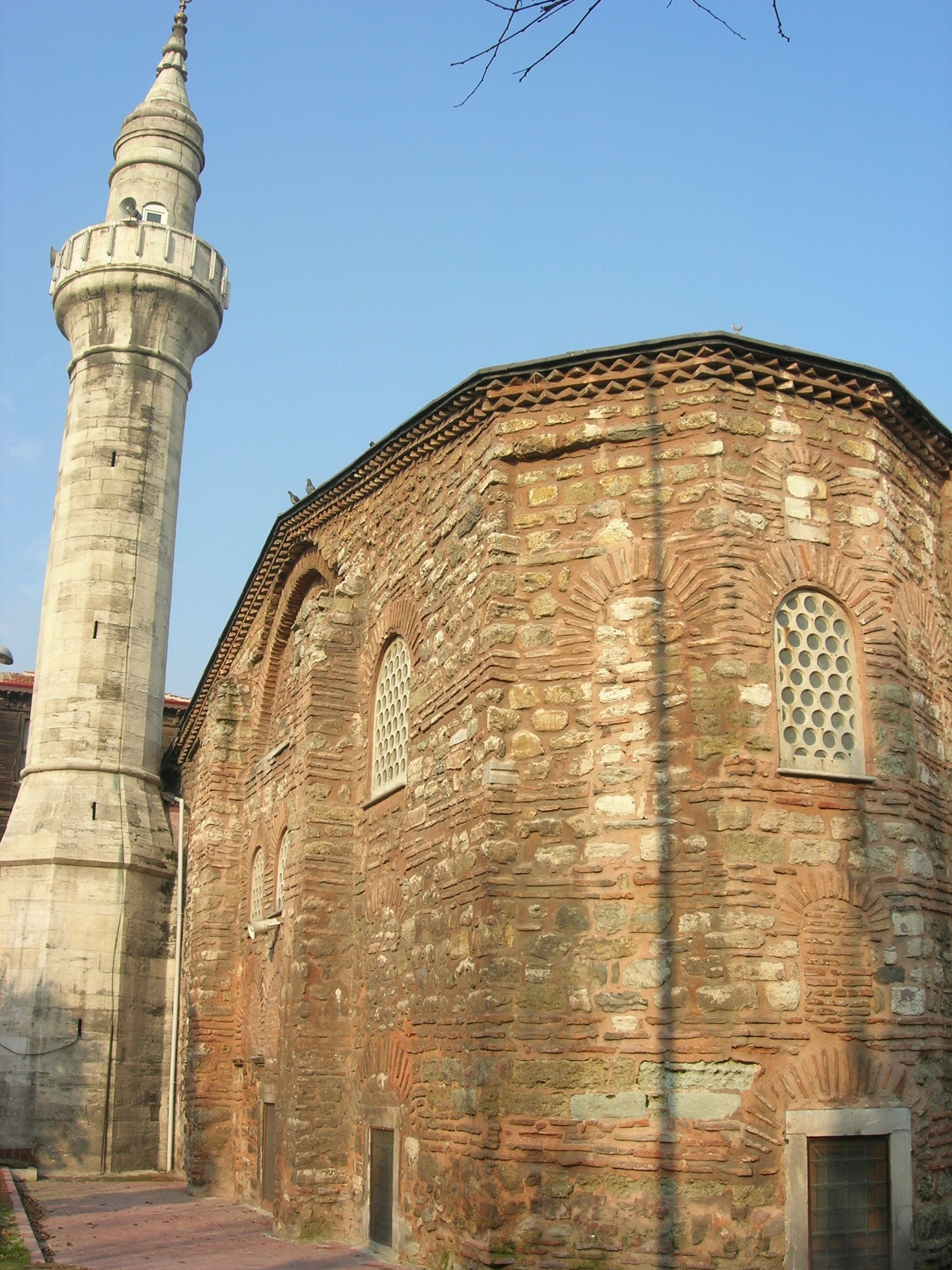
The Apse of the building

== History ==
Towards the middle of the ninth century, Princess Thekla, the eldest daughter of Emperor Theophilus enlarged a small oratory, dedicated to her patron saint and namesake, lying 150 metres (490 feet) east of the Church of Theotokos of the Blachernae. In 1059 Emperor Isaac I Komnenos built a larger church on this site, as thanks for surviving a hunting accident. The church was famous for its beauty, and Anna Comnena writes that her grandmother, Anna Dalassena, frequently used to pray there. After the Ottoman conquest of Constantinople, the building was heavily damaged during the earthquake of 1509, which destroyed the dome. Shortly after that, Kapicibaşi (and later Grand Vizier) Koca Mustafa Pasha repaired the damage and converted the church into a mosque.

Up to the end of the nineteenth century, a hamam, 150 metres (490 feet) south of the building, formed part of the mosque's foundation. In 1692, Şatir Hasan Ağa built a fountain in front of the mosque. In 1729, during the great Fire of Balat, the building was heavily damaged and had to be repaired. It was damaged again during the 1894 Istanbul earthquake, which destroyed the minaret, and didn't reopen for worship until 1906. A last restoration occurred in 1922. At that time, a cruciform marble baptismal font found across the street was removed to the Istanbul Archaeology Museum.

Inside the apse of the building is a türbe (tomb) attributed to Hazreti Cabir (Jabir) Ibn Abdallah-ül-Ensamı, one of the companions of Eyüp, who fell nearby in 678 during the first Arab siege of Constantinople.

== Architecture ==
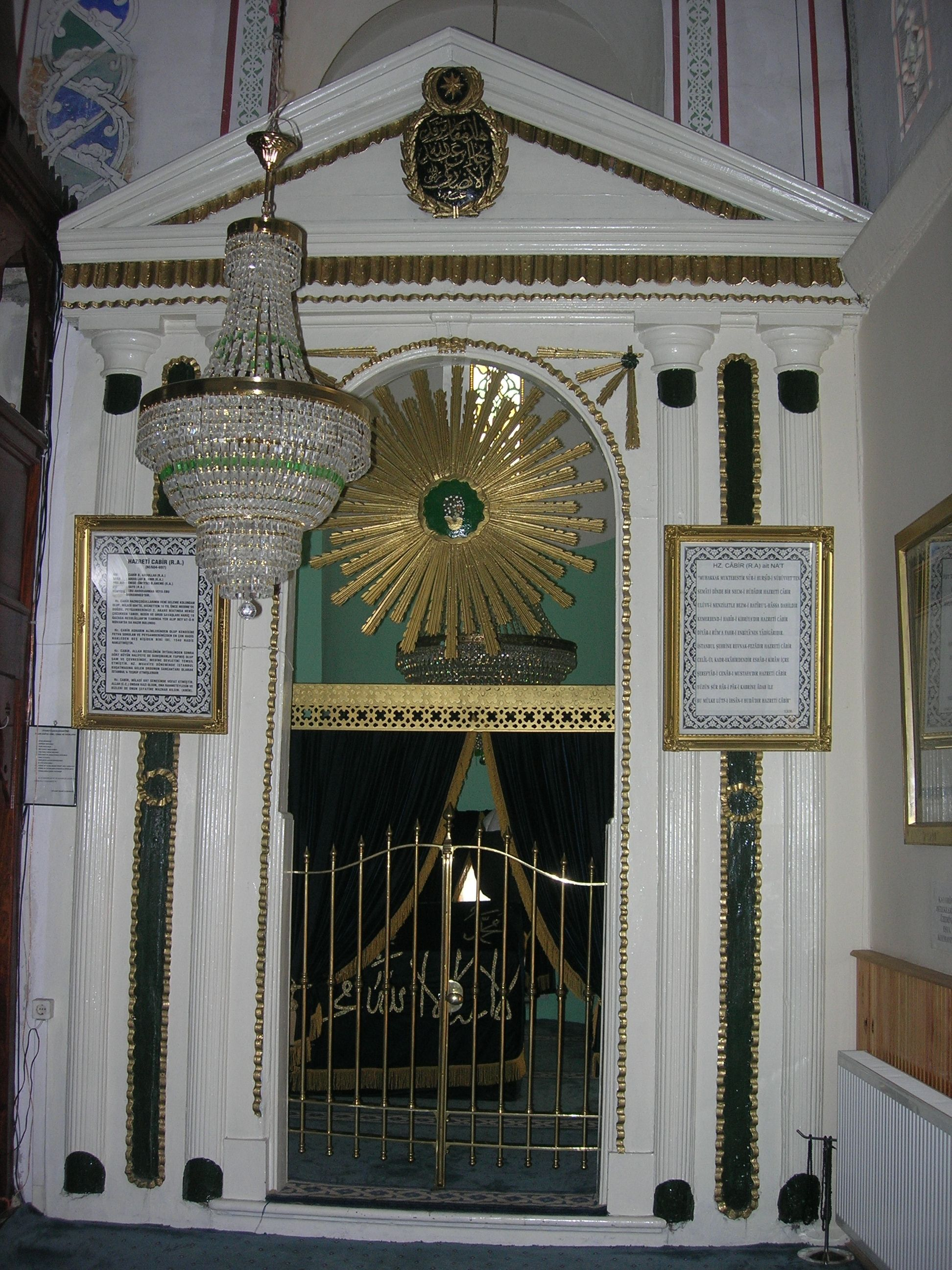
The alleged türbe (tomb) of Hazreti Cabir (Jabir) in the south apse.

The building is 15 metres (49 feet) wide and 17.5 metres (57 feet) long, and has a domed Greek cross plan. It is oriented in a northeast–southwest direction. It has three polygonal apses, and the narthex has been destroyed. There are no galleries, and the dome, which has no drum, is almost certainly Ottoman, although the arches and the piers which support it are Byzantine. The arms of the cross, the Pastophoria, the Prothesis and Diaconicon, are covered with barrel vaults, and joined by arches. The north and south walls have three arcades at floor level, three windows at the first level and a window with three lights at the second level. On the southeast side, each of the three apses is three-sided. The roof, the cornice and the wooden narthex, which replaced the old Byzantine narthex, are Ottoman.

The dome piers, which form the internal side of the cross, are L-shaped in an example of the stage preceding that of the cross-in-square church with four columns. Details of the frescoes on the south side of the building have been published. During floor renewal in the 1990s, several tesserae were found, revealing the previous existence of mosaics panels n the building.

Despite its architectural significance, the building has never undergone a systematic study.

== Gallery ==
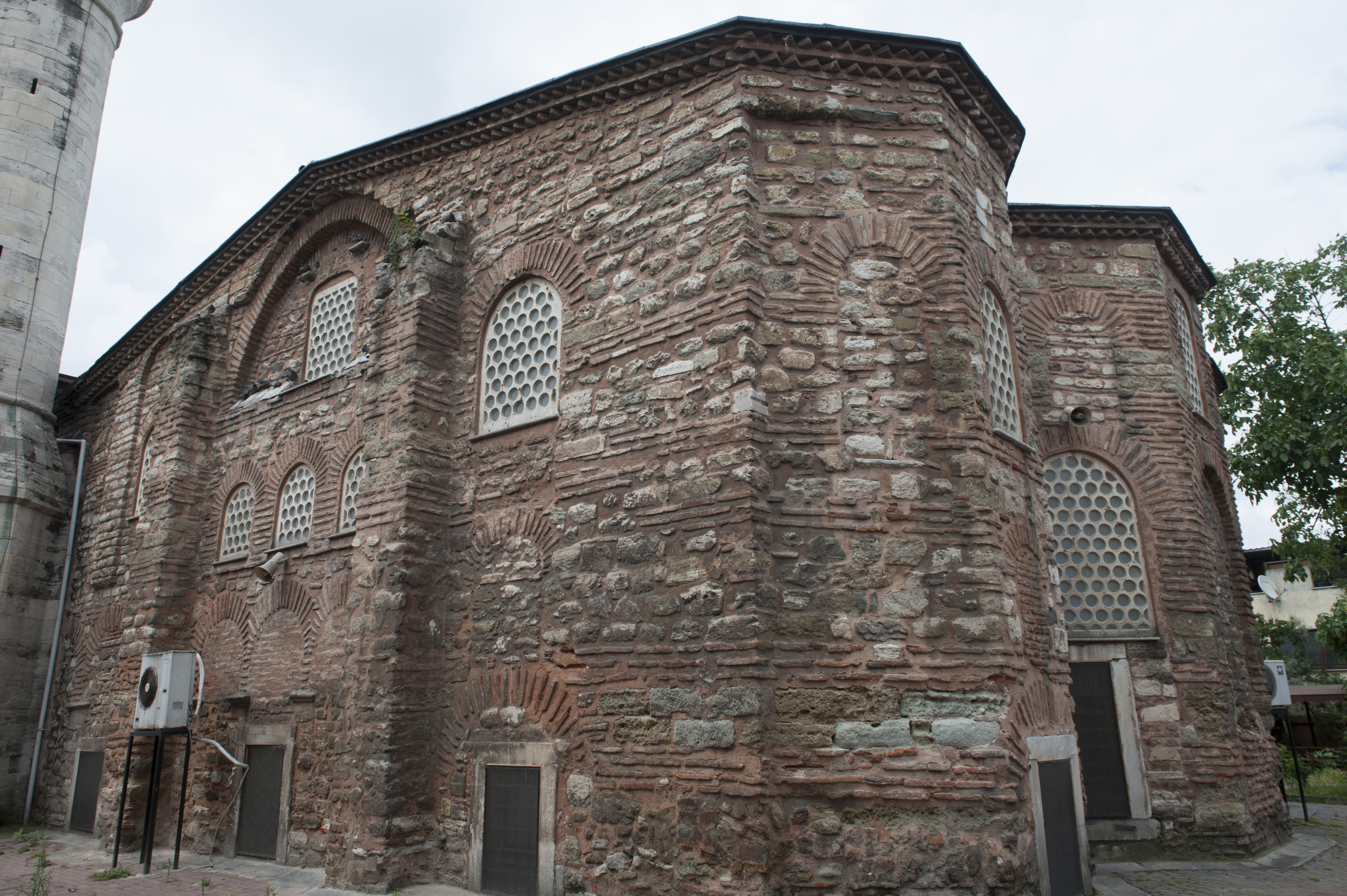
Atik Mustafa Pasha Mosque Exterior

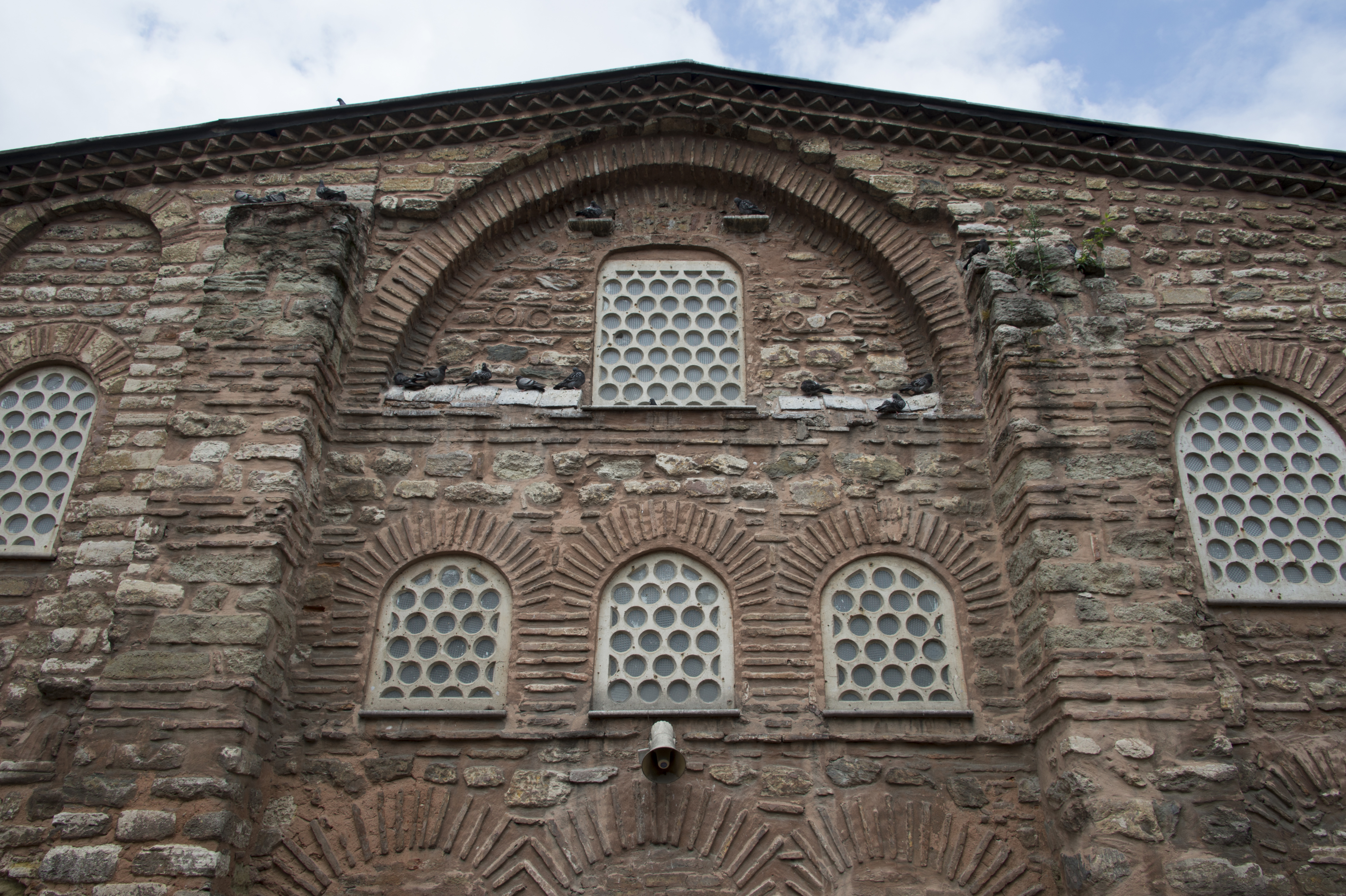
Atik Mustafa Pasha Mosque Facade detail

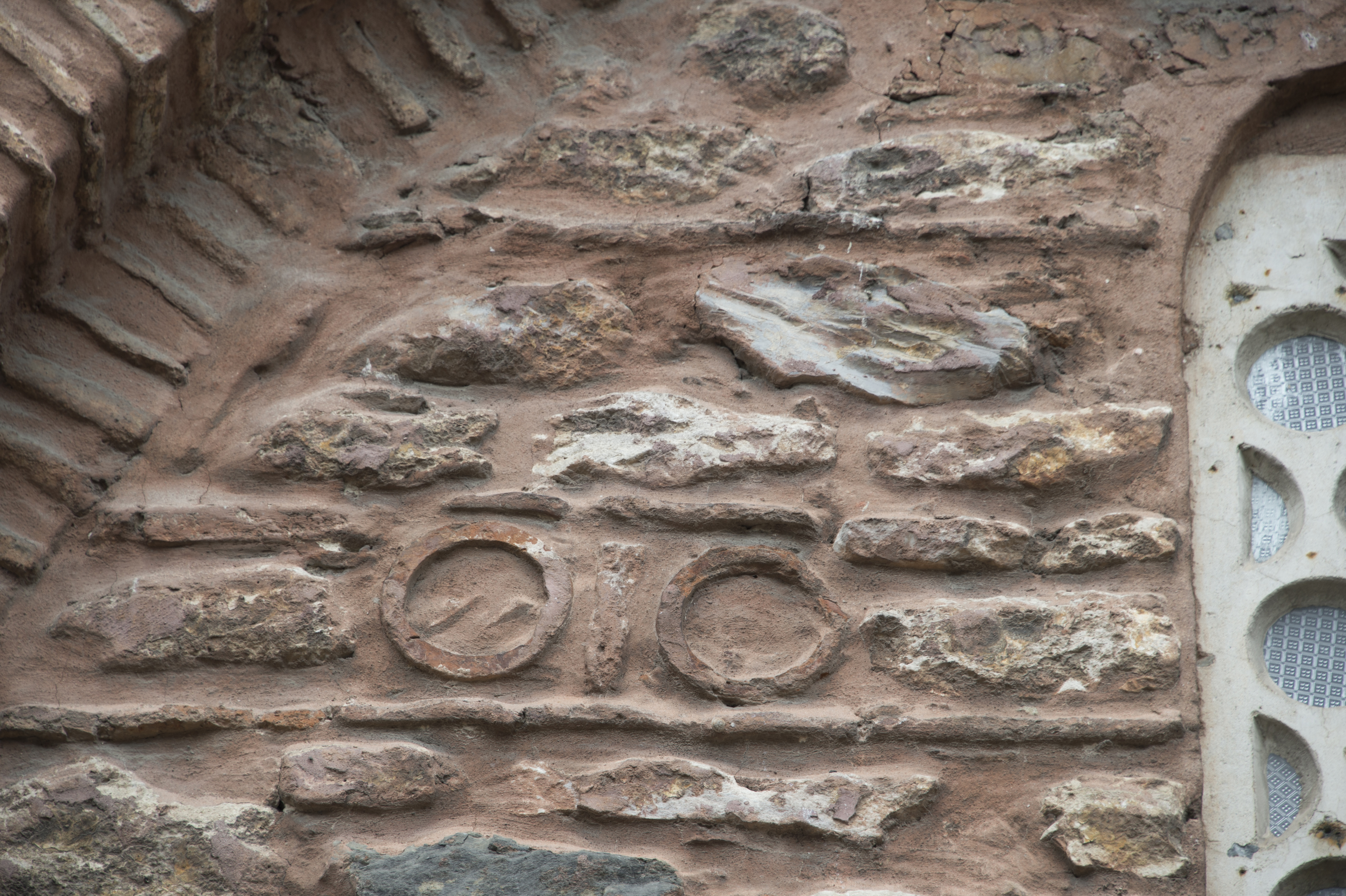
Atik Mustafa Pasha Mosque Decoration

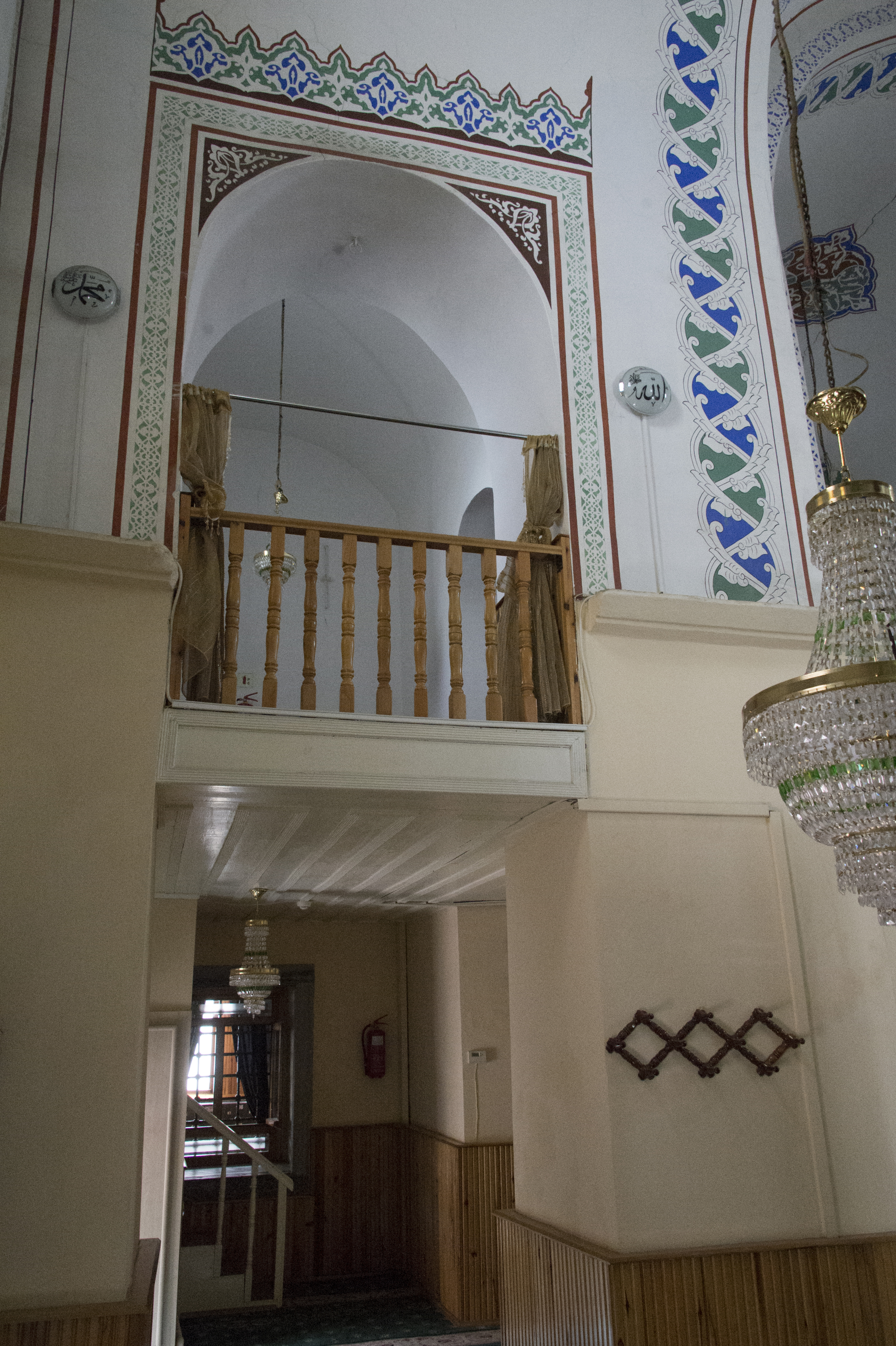
Atik Mustafa Pasha Mosque Interior

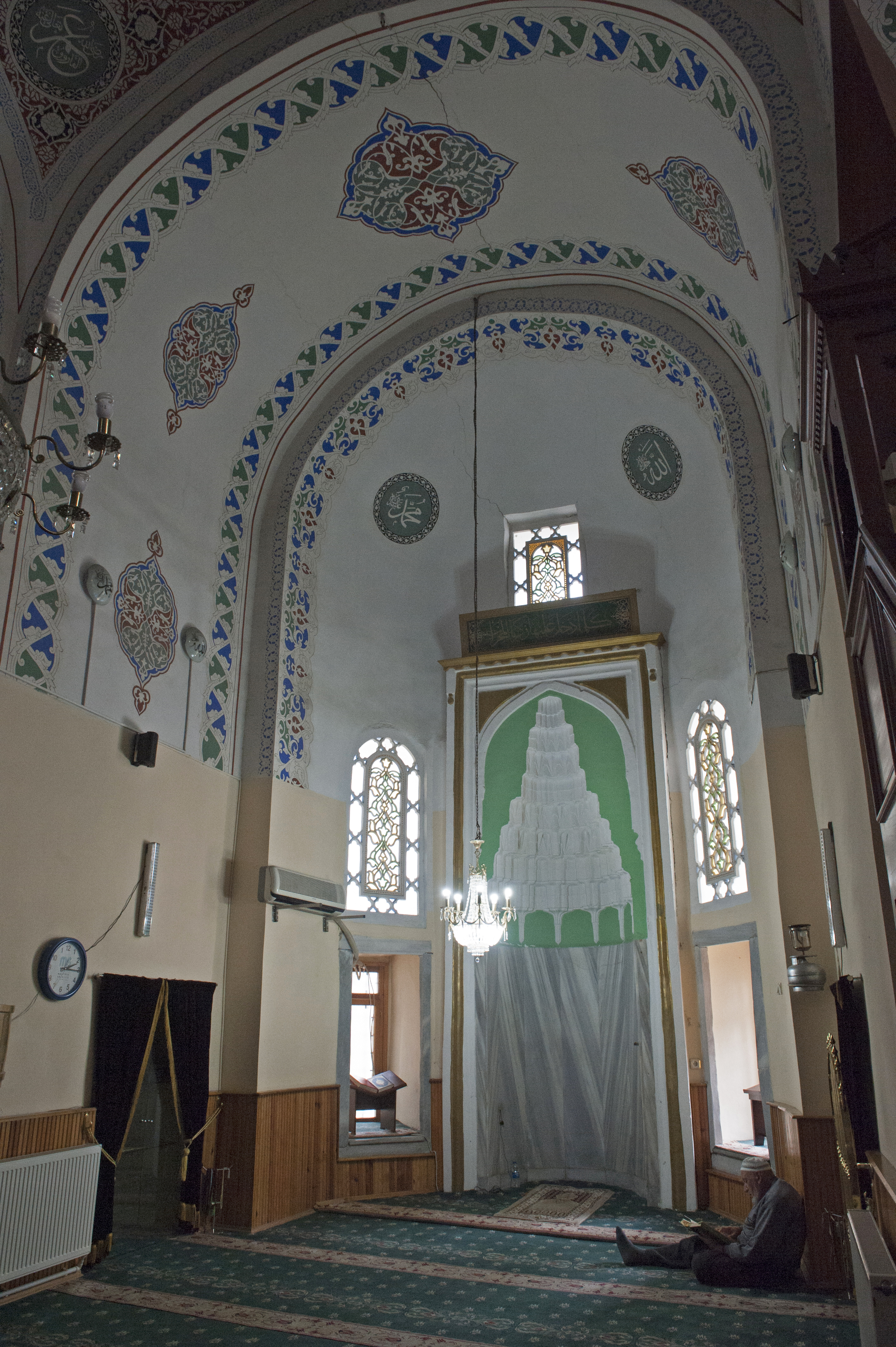
Atik Mustafa Pasha Mosque 6189

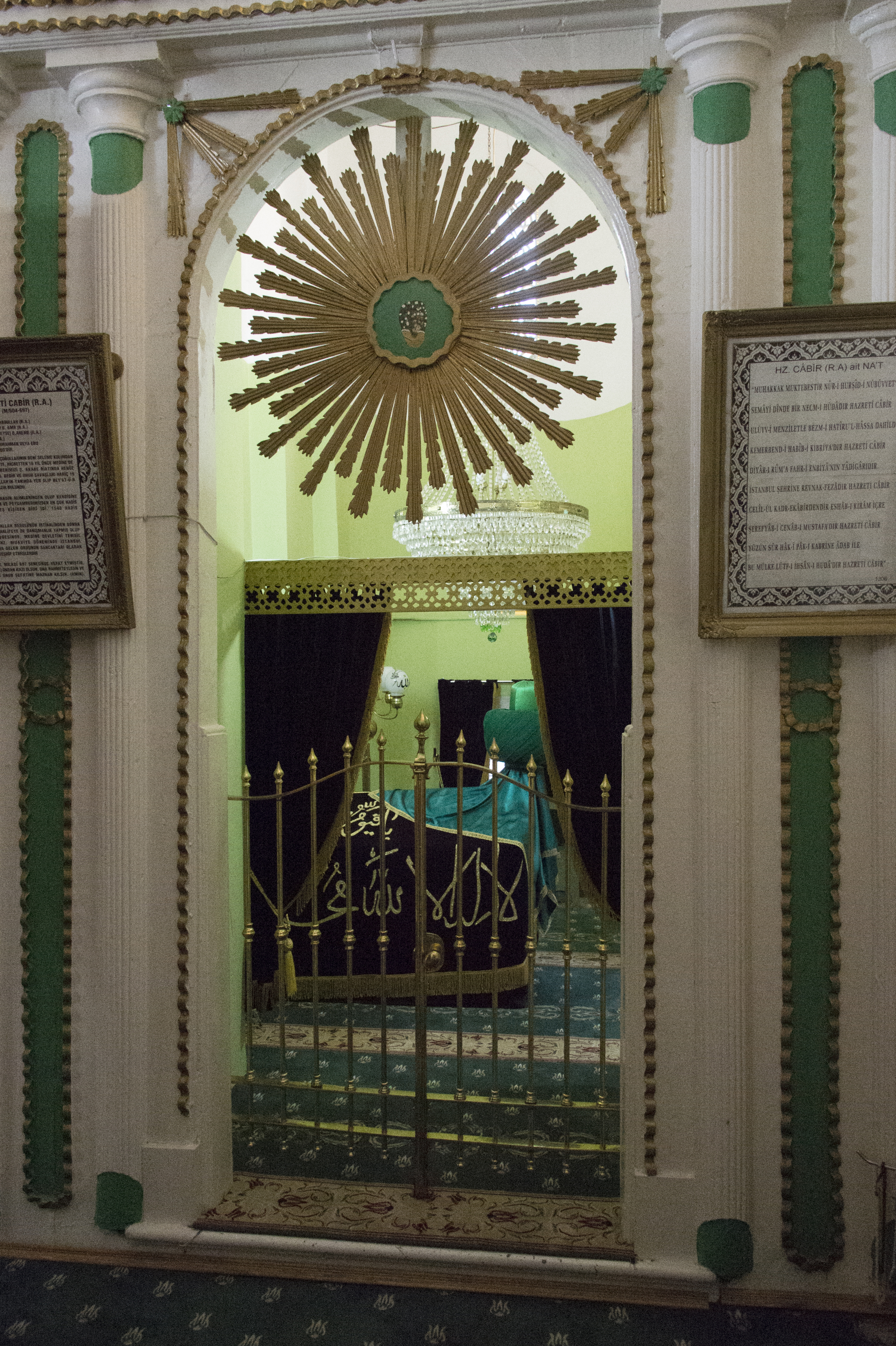
Atik Mustafa Pasha Mosque 4764

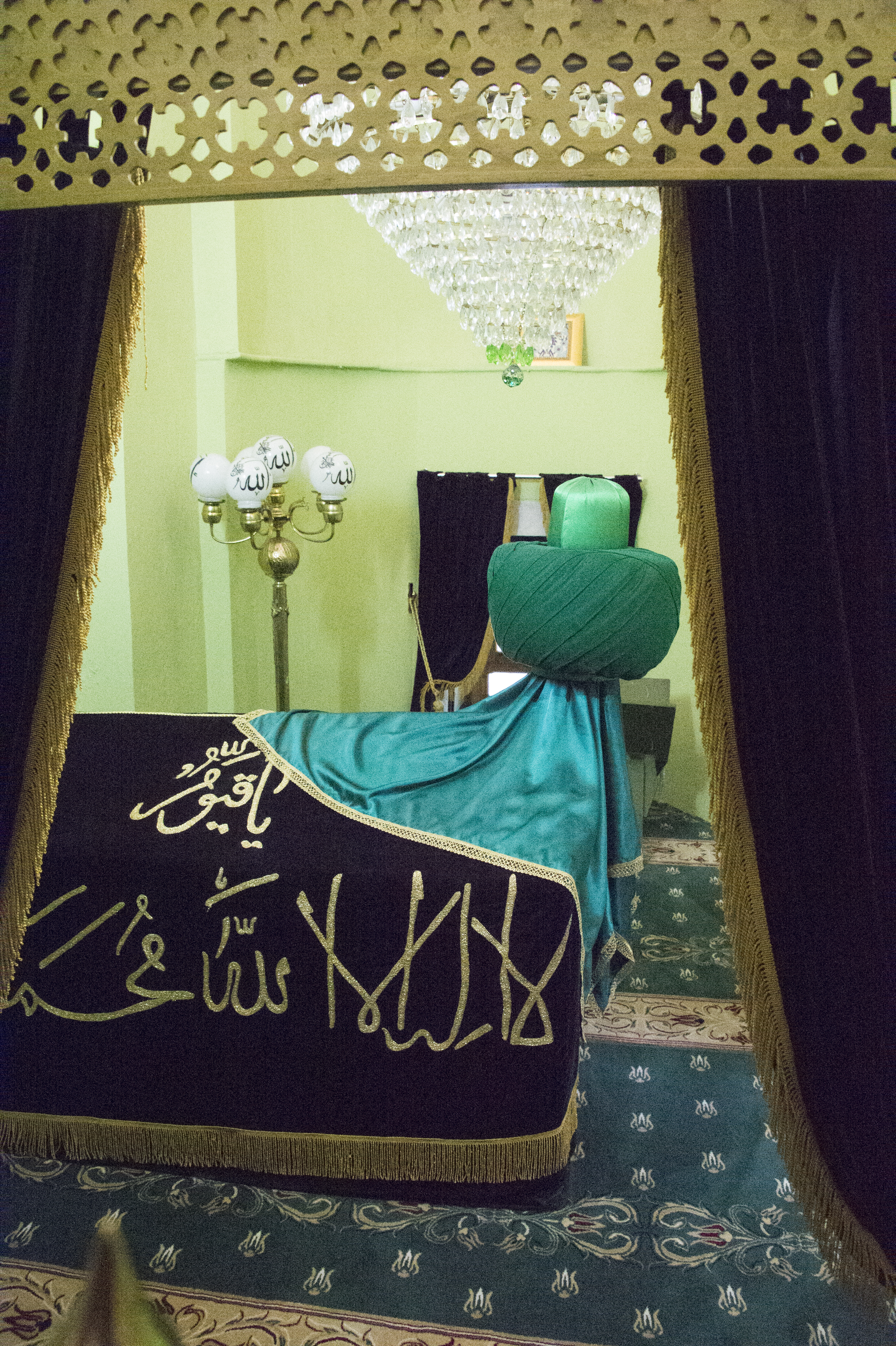
Atik Mustafa Pasha Mosque Türbe

== Sources ==
- Van Millingen, Alexander (1912). Byzantine Churches of Constantinople. London: MacMillan & Co.
- Janin, Raymond (1953). La Géographie ecclésiastique de l'Empire byzantin. 1. Part: Le Siège de Constantinople et le Patriarcat Oecuménique. 3rd Vol. : Les Églises et les Monastères (in French). Paris: Institut Français d'Etudes Byzantines.
- Mamboury, Ernest (1953). The Tourists' Istanbul. Istanbul: Çituri Biraderler Basımevi.
- Eyice, Semavi (1955). Istanbul. Petite Guide a travers les Monuments Byzantins et Turcs (in French). Istanbul: Istanbul Matbaası.
- Gülersoy, Çelik (1976). A Guide to Istanbul. Istanbul: Istanbul Kitaplığı. OCLC 3849706.
- Müller-Wiener, Wolfgang (1977). Bildlexikon Zur Topographie Istanbuls: Byzantion, Konstantinupolis, Istanbul Bis Zum Beginn D. 17 Jh (in German). Tübingen: Wasmuth. ISBN 978-3-8030-1022-3.
- Tunay, Mehmet (2001). "Byzantine Archeological Findings in Istanbul". In Necipoğlu, Nevra (ed.). Byzantine Constantinople: Monuments, Topography and everyday Life. Leiden, Boston, Köln: Brill. ISBN 90-04-11625-7.
