= Edinburgh Magazine =

Edinburgh Magazine may refer to:

- Blackwood's Edinburgh Magazine, printed from 1817 to 1980
- Edinburgh Magazine and Literary Miscellany, a series published by The Scots Magazine ca. 1825
- Edinburgh Magazine, or Literary Miscellany, printed for J. Sibbald from 1787 to 1802
- Edinburgh Magazine, or, Weekly Amusement, published by Walter Ruddiman in 1779
- Edinburgh Magazine and Review, a monthly periodical published from 1773 to 1776
- Tait's Edinburgh Magazine, a monthly periodical published from 1832 to 1861

== See also ==
- Chambers's Edinburgh Journal, a weekly magazine published from 1832 to 1956
- The List (magazine), an Edinburgh-based fortnightly entertainment event listings magazine first published in 1985
- London and Edinburgh Philosophical Magazine, a scientific journal first published in 1798
- Edinburgh Magazine - edinburghmagazine.com, an online publication of positive local news published from 2019 to present
