= Blachernae =

Constantinople quarter

Coordinates: 41°02′02″N 28°56′25″E

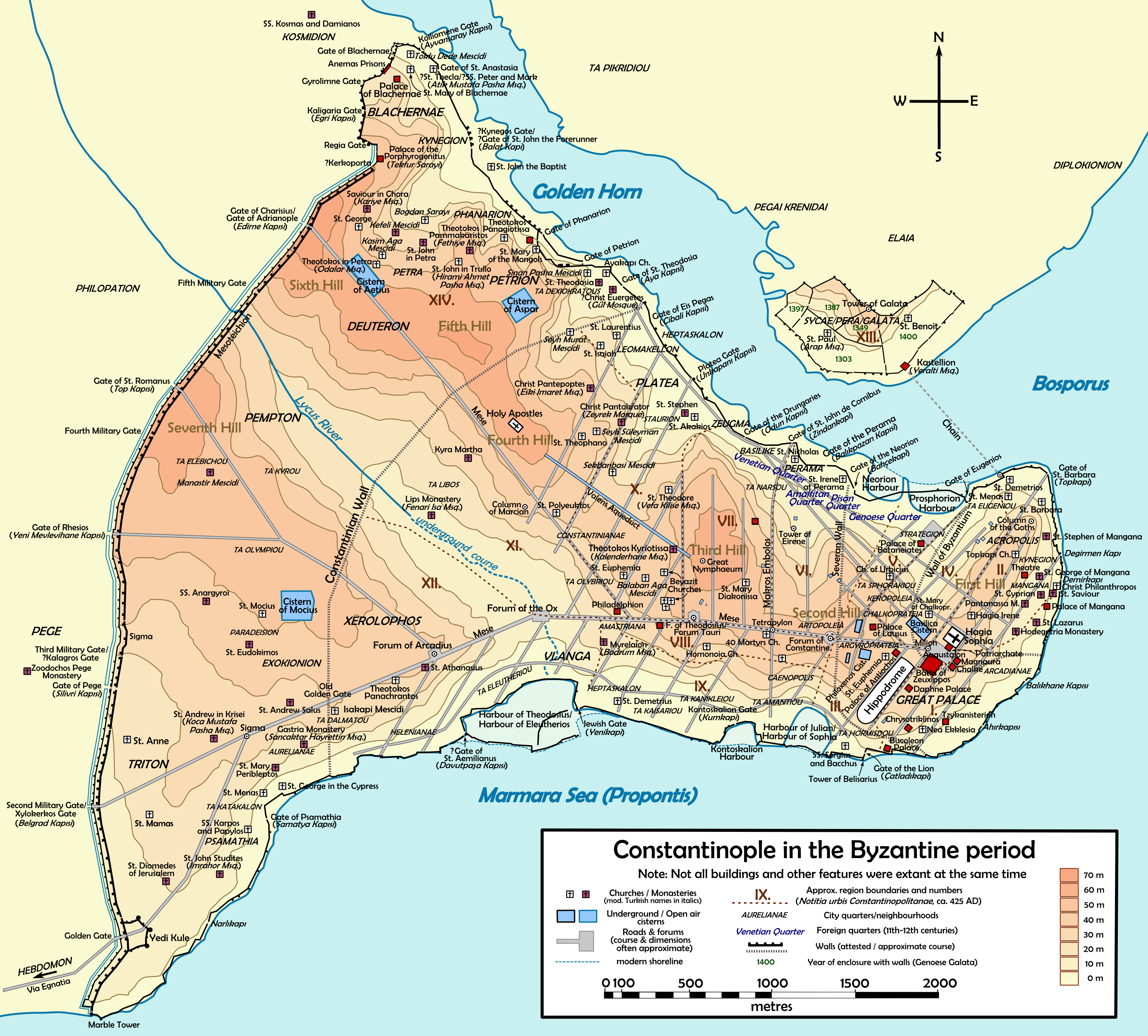
Map of Byzantine-era Constantinople showing Blachernae at the top

Blachernae (Medieval Greek: Βλαχέρναι) was a suburb in the northwestern section of Constantinople, the capital city of the Byzantine Empire. It is the site of a water source and a number of prominent churches were built there, most notably the great Church of St. Mary of Blachernae (Panagia Blacherniotissa), built by Empress Pulcheria in c. 450, expanded by Emperor Leo I (r. 457–474) and renovated by Emperor Justinian I (r. 527–565) in the 6th century.

== Etymology ==
The name Blachernae is traditionally said to derive from a species of fish called blakernai (also called lakernai), which was commonly found in the waters near the northwestern edge of Constantinople. According to local accounts preserved among the Greek inhabitants of the city, the quarter took its name from the fishermen who settled in the area and made a living from catching and selling these fish. This folk belief was first recorded by the 19th-century Greek historian Skarlatos Byzantios, who noted that it was based on local Greek tradition. A similar explanation appears in a religious document dated to 1351, which states that the district derived its name from the Latin name of a species of fish commonly sold there by fishermen returning from the Bosphorus.

The earliest known explanation for the name of the district appears in a later copy of the chronicle attributed to Genesios, made sometime between the 10th and 13th centuries. In this manuscript, a later addition inserted in parentheses claims that the name "Blachernae" originated from an ancient Scythian king who was killed in that area.

In 1920, Romanian philologist Ilie Gherghel proposed that the name Blachernae may be connected to the Romanians, who were referred to as Vlachs (also spelled Blach or Blasi) in the Middle Ages. He argued that the toponym might have originated from the name of a Vlach individual or community in the region. Gherghel compared data from old historians and suggested that a small Vlach community may have existed in the area of today Blachernae. It is possible that this community was so influential that the district itself came to bear their name. A similar view was later supported by another Romanian historian, G. Popa Lisseanu, who also argued in favor of the Vlach origin for the name.

== Byzantine era ==
The quarter is recorded as regio XIV in the early 5th-century Notitia Urbis Constantinopolitanae, where it is recorded as being enclosed by a wall of its own. The name Blachernae appeared in a work of Theophanes the Confessor in connection with a revolt of Flavius Vitalianus against Emperor Anastasius I in 513. The quarter was connected to the city proper at the construction of the Theodosian Walls, but the Church of St. Mary remained outside of the walls until 627, when Emperor Heraclius (r. 610–641) built another wall to enclose it. By that time, the church had become the major Marian shrine of the city, and the second-most important church in Constantinople after Hagia Sophia, if only because the emperors' residence was nearby. In 1347, Emperor John VI Kantakouzenos (r. 1347–1354) was crowned there, instead of at Hagia Sophia.

South of the church and situated on the city's Seventh Hill stood the imperial Palace of Blachernae, which was first erected in c. 500. During the Komnenian period, it became the favourite imperial residence, eclipsing the older Great Palace of Constantinople on the eastern end of the city. Although the Latin emperors returned to the Bucoleon Palace, the Palaiologos emperors of the restored Byzantine Empire again used the Blachernae Palace as their main residence. The Palace of the Porphyrogenitus (Turkish: Tekfur Sarayı) and the Prison of Anemas are the main surviving structures of the Palace of Blachernae, which was a complex of multiple buildings.

Following the fall of Constantinople to the Ottomans in May 1453, the Sultan's residence was moved to Topkapı Palace on the site of the ancient acropolis of Byzantium, opposite to the original site of the Great Palace, which had by this time fallen into complete ruin, and the Blachernae area (with the exception of the Palace of Porphyrogenitus) fell into disuse.

During the Byzantine Papacy, the portion of the Aventine overlooking the Greek quarter of Rome became known as the ad Balcernas or Blachernas.

== Today ==
The historic Blachernae area is in the present-day Istanbul quarter known as Ayvansaray. The sacred spring, associated with the Virgin Mary, can still be visited today; in Turkish it is named Ayazma, a name derived from the Greek term hagiasma (Greek: ἁγίασμα), meaning "holy water".

== Gallery ==
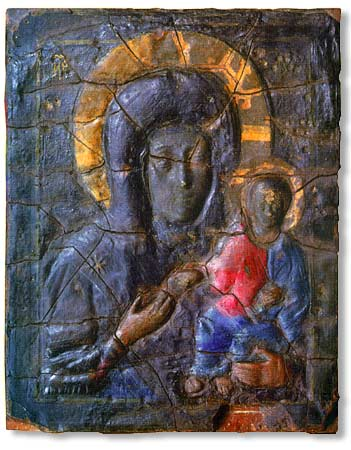
Our Lady of Blachernae, an icon of the Theotokos from the church of the Blachernae.

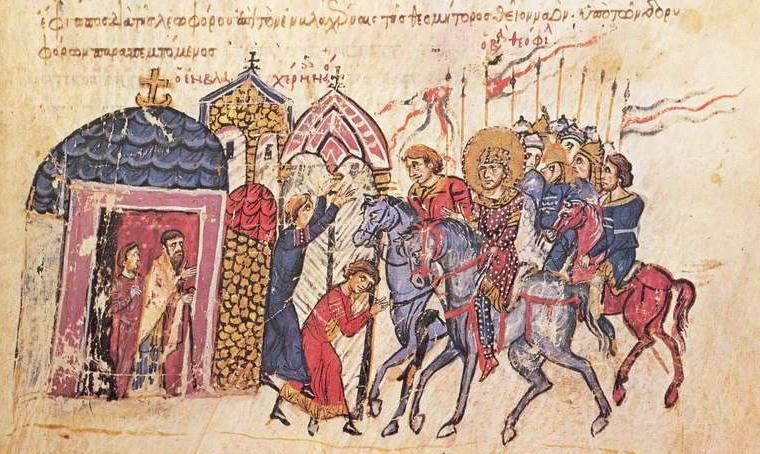
Byzantine emperor Theophilus (r. 829–842), on horseback, visits the Church of St. Mary in the Constantinopolitan suburb of Blachernae.

== See also ==
- Atik Mustafa Pasha Mosque
- Blachernitissa
- Blanquerna
- Intercession of the Theotokos

== Sources ==
- Gherghel, Ilie (1920). Cateva consideratiuni la cuprinsul notiunii cuvantului "Vlach" (in Romanian). Bucuresti: Convorbiri Literare.
- Kazhdan, Alexander Petrovich, ed. (1991). Oxford Dictionary of Byzantium. New York, New York and Oxford, United Kingdom: Oxford University Press. ISBN 978-0-19-504652-6.
- van Millingen, Alexander (1899). Byzantine Constantinople: The Walls of the City and Adjoining Historical Sites. London, United Kingdom: John Murray.
