= James Sibbald (bookseller) =

Scottish bookseller and journal editor (1747–1803)

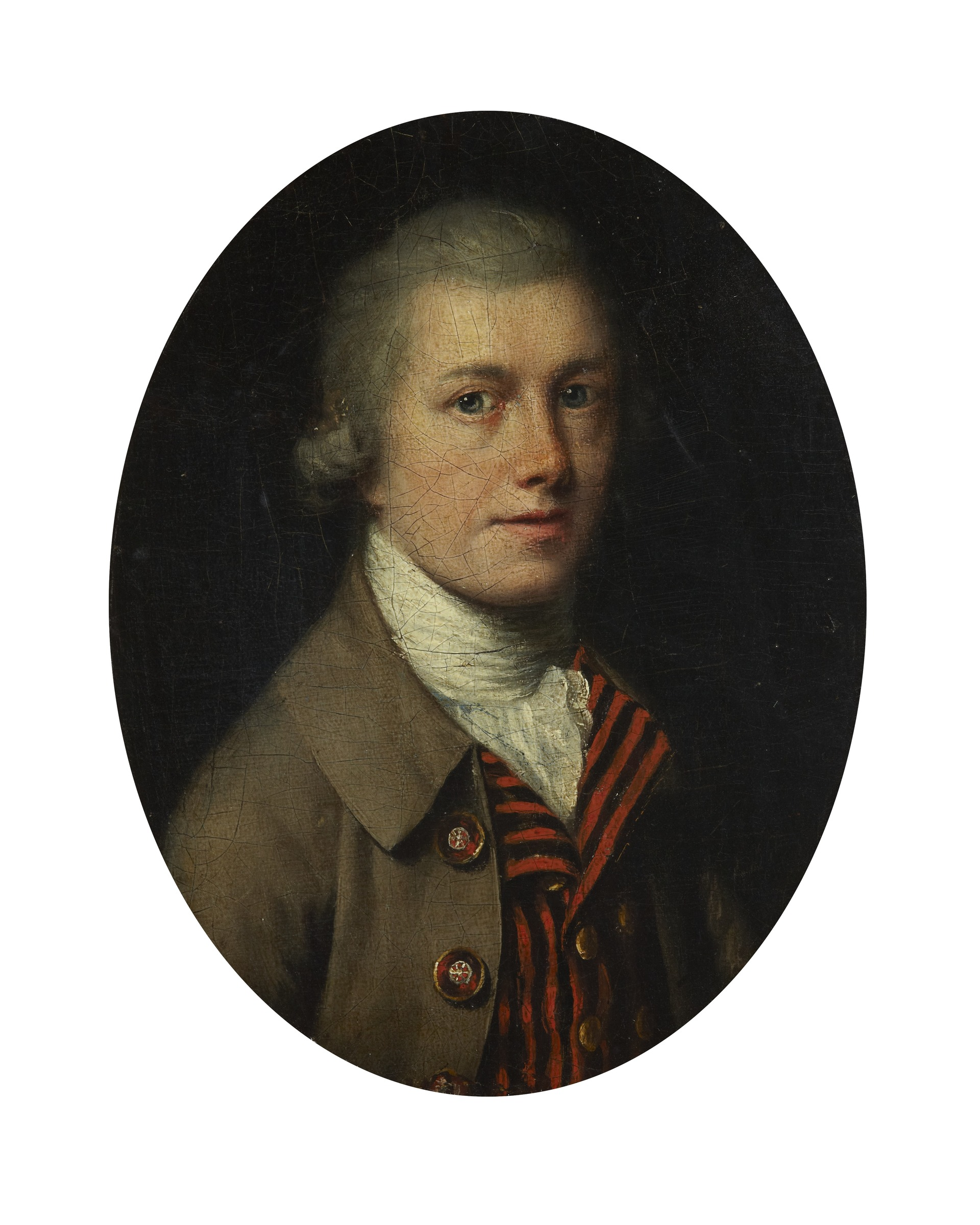
James Sibbald, portrait by unknown artist (after 1765)

James Sibbald (1745/47–1803) was a Scottish bookseller, publisher, journal editor, and author, active in Edinburgh. The son of a farmer, he started in life as a farm labourer, and later became employed in the shop of Charles Elliot, bookseller. In 1783 he went into the bookselling business on his own. He founded the Edinburgh Magazine and edited the Edinburgh Herald, wrote articles on antiquarian subjects, and published the Chronicle of the Poetry of Scotland (1802).

== Life ==
James Sibbald was the son of John Sibbald, farmer, of Whitlaw, Roxburghshire, where James was born on 28 April 1745. After education at Selkirk Grammar School young Sibbald leased the farms of Newtown and Whitehillbrae from Sir Francis Elliot of Stobs. Botany and classical studies occupied his leisure hours, but the farming venture failed. In May 1779 he gave up his lease, and relocated to Edinburgh, where he entered the publishing firm of his friend Charles Elliot as a volunteer shopman. In 1780, having purchased from a Mrs. Yair the "circulating library" (the first of the kind in Scotland) which had formerly belonged to Allan Ramsay, he also carried on a business as a bookseller and publisher in Parliament Square off the Royal Mile.

In the account of his own early life Scott writes:

I fastened also, like a tiger, upon every collection of old songs or romances which chance threw into my way, or which my scrutiny was able to discover on the dusty shelves of James Sibbald's circulating library in the Parliament Square. This collection, now dismantled and dispersed, contained at that time many rare and curious works, seldom found in such a collection. Mr. Sibbald himself, a man of rough manners but of some taste and judgment, cultivated music and poetry, and in his shop I had a distant view of some literary characters, Burns among others.

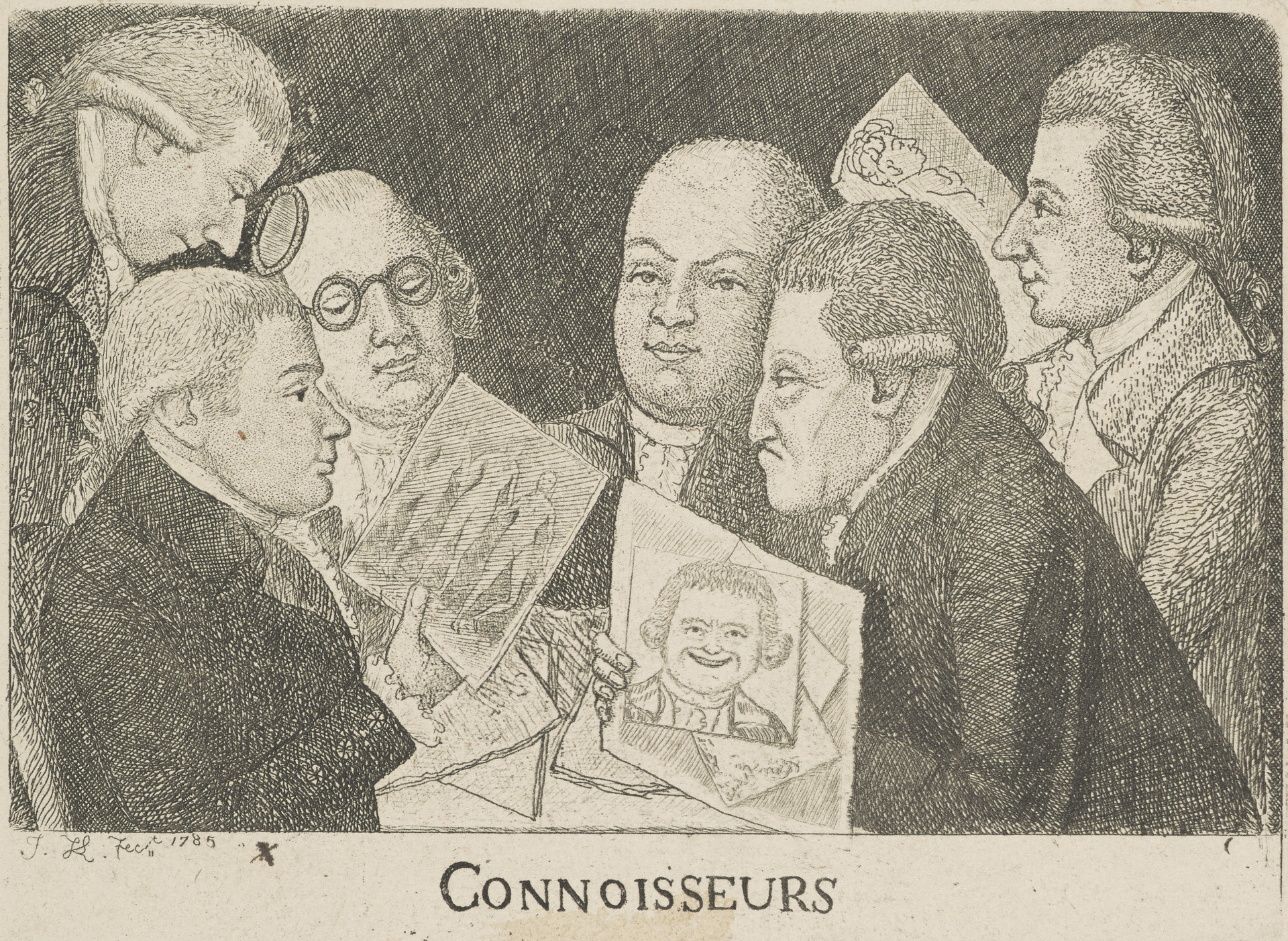
Connoisseurs, etching by John Kay (1785) Sibbald, seated, second from left, with W. Scott, George Fairbairn, and James Kerr

Sibbald conducted his bookselling and publishing with much enterprise, and was successful in bringing out engravings, especially coloured mezzotints. In 1785 he established the Edinburgh Magazine, or Literary Miscellany, the first serious rival of the Scots Magazine. He was the editor, and wrote many articles, especially on Scottish antiquities. From 1786, when Burns first called upon him in Edinburgh, Sibbald was a generous friend to the poet, and his paper on the 'Kilmarnock' edition of Burns in the Edinburgh Magazine for October 1786 was the first serious review the young poet had. In order to devote himself more to literature and the magazine, Sibbald gave up the bookselling business to Messrs. Lawrie & Symington, and after 1792 his name disappeared from the imprint of the periodical, which thenceforth bore that of Lawrie & Symington, but was still carried on for his benefit. The circulation was between six hundred and seven hundred copies. In 1803 it was merged in the Scots Magazine. A newspaper, The Edinburgh Herald, was started by him in July 1793, but did not last long. He was the editor, and wrote leading articles, at that time a novelty in Scotland. In July 1793 Sibbald agreed to convey the circulating library to Lawrie for ten years from 1794 for a rent of 200 l. per annum, subject to a deduction for purchases of new books. Sibbald soon afterwards went to London and was lost sight of by his relatives. His brother William, a merchant at Leith, having managed to communicate with him, received this reply: 'My lodging is in Soho, and my business is so so'. In 1797 he returned to Edinburgh and produced The Vocal Magazine, a selection of the most esteemed English, Scots, and Irish airs, ancient and modern, adapted for the harpsichord or violin. The next year he published a book written during his residence in London, Record of the Public Ministry of Jesus Christ, comprehending all that is related by the four evangelists in one regular narrative, with preliminary observations. Sibbald's view was that the public ministrations of our Lord only occupied a period of about twelve months. In 1799 he entered into a fresh agreement with Lawrie, who took a lease of the circulating library for twenty-one years from 1800 at an annual payment of one hundred guineas, and engaged to purchase all the new books himself. The library did not prosper, and Lawrie gave it up to Sibbald, who retained it until his death, when his brother and executor, William, tried to continue it, but without much success, under the care of Stevenson the bookseller; upon Stevenson's death it was sold to Alexander Mackay, who much improved it and carried it on for many years. At one time the library contained thirty-eight thousand volumes.

For a long time Sibbald had been occupied upon the work by which he is best known: Chronicle of Scottish Poetry from the Thirteenth Century to the Union of the Crowns, to which is added a glossary, Edinburgh, 1802, 4 vols. 8vo. The first three volumes consist of a chronological series of extracts from the writings of the Scottish poets, with biographical and critical notices; the fourth volume is devoted to the glossary. In a review of the work Sir Walter Scott says: 'The chronicle itself contains little that may not be found in the libraries of most antiquaries; but all such libraries will in future be imperfect without this glossary'. Sibbald also printed fifty copies, for private circulation, of Ane Pleasant Satyre of the Thrie Estaitis, be Sir David Lindsay, Edinburgh, 1802, 8vo.

Sibbald died in Leith Walk on 8 April 1803. He was of an eccentric but benevolent disposition, and a member of many convivial clubs. John Kay etched two portraits of him—one representing him walking up the High Street, the other in a group of print collectors. A portrait, by Sir Henry Raeburn, is in the Scottish National Gallery.

== Bibliography ==
- Kay, John (1877). A Series of Original Portraits and Caricature Etchings. New Ed. Vol. 1. Edinburgh: Adam and Charles Black. No. CLXII. pp. 410–414.
- Lockhart, J. G. (1837). Memoirs of the Life of Sir Walter Scott, Bart. Vol. 1. Edinburgh: Robert Cadell; London: John Murray and Whitaker and Co. p. 46.
- McDougall (2011). "Sibbald, James (1747–1803), bookseller and journal editor". In Oxford Dictionary of National Biography. Oxford University Press.
- Scott, Walter (1804). "Sibbald's Chronicle of Scottish Poetry". The Edinburgh Review, or Critical Journal: for Oct. 1803 to Jan. 1804. Vol. 3. Edinburgh: D. Willison. p. 210.
- Tedder, Henry Richard (1897). "Sibbald, James (1745-1803)" . In Lee, Sidney (ed.). Dictionary of National Biography. Vol. 52. London: Smith, Elder & Co. pp. 178–179.
