= John Logan (minister) =

Scottish poet and minister (1748–1788)

Rev John Logan FRSE (1748–1788) was a minister in Leith, Scotland, a popular preacher known also as a historian. Self-destructive behaviour saw him end his life as a hack writer in London.

== Early life ==
He was born at a farm in Soutra, near Fala, Midlothian to George Logan, a farmer, and his wife Janet Waterston, daughter of John Waterston in the parish of Stow. The family moved to Gosford Mains, near Aberlady in East Lothian. In terms of their religious belief they were dissenters: members of the Burgher branch of the First Secession. They attended the church of John Brown in Haddington. John then went to the grammar school of Musselburgh; it may have been there that he encountered Alexander Carlyle, a continuing influence in his life.

Logan entered the University of Edinburgh in 1762, where he was taught by Hugh Blair. Lord Elibank, who then resided at Ballencrieff in the parish of Aberlady, interested himself in Logan's welfare, and gave him access to his library.

After he had completed his studies for the ministry of the Church of Scotland, Logan became, on the recommendation of Blair, tutor to John Sinclair, son of George Sinclair of Ulbster in Caithness.

== Ministry ==
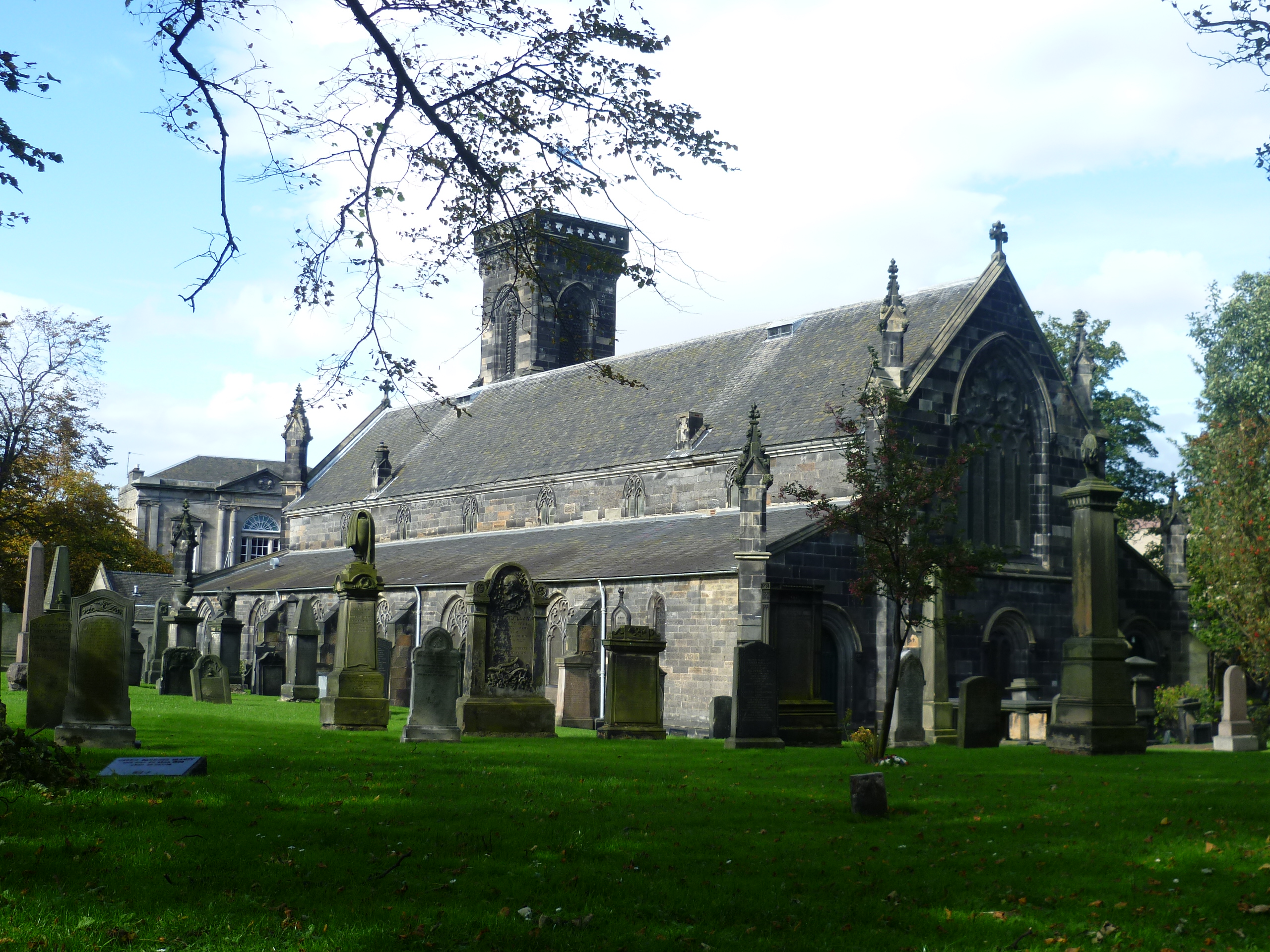
South Leith Parish Church

Logan was licensed as a preacher by the presbytery of Haddington, East Lothian on 27 September 1770. In 1771 he was presented to South Leith Parish Church for acceptance as their minister. A dispute intervened, not helped by Logan's writing a first and satirical drama, The Planters of the Vineyard. In April 1773 he was ordained and admitted as "second charge" minister of the parish of South Leith.

Logan's literary reputation led to his being appointed by the General Assembly in 1775 a member of the committee charged with the revision and enlargement of the paraphrases and hymns for use in public worship, with Blair, William Cameron and John Morison. Logan became the major contributor to the collection.

== Resignation ==
Logan's connection with the stage gave offence to his parishioners. He was also depressive, and drank. He fathered an illegitimate son by a servant girl, and went off to London in 1781. He was not short of influential friends willing to help, with suggestions such as a change of parish to Canongate for which the support of John Sincliar was sought. Adam Smith also wrote to the printer Andrew Strahan on his behalf. Logan was a founding fellow of the Royal Society of Edinburgh in 1783.

In 1783 he had a play "Runnamede" performed on the Edinburgh stage at the Theatre Royal at the east end of Princes Street.

A second pregnant parishioner in 1785 proved the last straw. Logan resigned his charge, 27 December 1786, on being allowed an annuity from the living.

== Later life ==
The rest of Logan's life was spent in London, where he occupied himself with writing. Through Samuel Charters and Adam Smith he became editor of the English Review, collaborating with Gilbert Stuart. There in 1787 he punctured the "Ayrshire ploughman" image of Robert Burns by pointing out that he was a tenant farmer.

In 1788 Logan published A Review of the Principal Charges against Warren Hastings, which involved the publisher John Stockdale in a libel action. It was a polemic defending Hastings against the Edmund Burke line, citing oriental despotism, Montesquieu and Edward Gibbon. Thomas Erskine defended Stockdale successfully, arguing that Logan's aspersions were made in good faith.

Logan died in London on 25 December 1788 and was buried on 28 December. His grave location is not known.

== Works ==
Logan was a historian of the "Robertsonian" school, with James Dunbar and Robert Henry. He also wrote poetry, two dramas, and sermons.

=== History ===
During the college sessions of 1779–80, 1780–1, Logan read a course of historical lectures in Edinburgh, under the patronage of William Robertson, Hugh Blair, and other literati; and in 1781 published an analysis of the lectures, entitled Elements of the Philosophy of History. Logan, however, became disillusioned with Robertson, who supported Alexander Fraser Tytler for the chair of history he had aimed at himself.

The year 1787 saw the publication of one of Logan's lectures, entitled An Essay on the Manners and Governments of Asia. This was the work of William Creech, from shorthand notes, and was on the theme of despotism and theocracy.

A View of Antient History, by William Rutherford, head of an academy at Uxbridge, which appeared in two volumes (1788–93), was believed by Logan's friends to have been written by him. It was in fact adapted from his Edinburgh lectures.

=== Poetry ===
In 1773 Logan published the poems of his friend and fellow-student Michael Bruce, and added "some poems written by different authors". In 1781 he published a volume of poems, including the Ode to the Cuckoo, and others which he had printed along with those of Michael Bruce, and also his main contributions to the paraphrases. His song "The Braes of Yarow" was republished by Coleridge in the third issue of his short-lived 1796 politically radical periodical The Watchman

==== Authorship controversy ====
Logan left other manuscripts, of which Thomas Robertson of Dalmeny, his college friend and literary executor, gave an account in a letter to Robert Anderson, dated 19 September 1795. In this letter Robertson also listed Logan's poems, including the Ode to the Cuckoo. Bruce's friends had claimed for him the authorship of the Ode to the Cuckoo. and other poems and hymns which Logan had published under his own name. Logan's authorship of the poems and hymns he claimed was defended by David Laing, John Small, and the Rev. R. Small. Modern scholarship favours Bruce as the author.

=== Drama ===
In 1783 Logan's tragedy, Runnamede, was acted in the Edinburgh Theatre. It reflected contemporary politics in its emphasis on the liberties of the subject. It made out a clear parallel between John of England and King George III of Great Britain, and for that reason the censorship of the Lord Chamberlain had prevented its production on the London stage. Walter Scott later wrote that the idea of the contrast drawn in Ivanhoe between Saxons and Normans was drawn from the staging of Runnamede with (anachronistic) Saxon and Norman barons on opposite sides of the theatre.

=== Sermons ===
In 1790 and 1791 two volumes of his Sermons were published under the supervision of his friends, Thomas Robertson of Dalmeny, Hugh Blair, and Thomas Hardy. An issue of plagiarism from sermons of Georg Joachim Zollikofer was raised.

== Notes ==
Attribution

- This article incorporates text from a publication now in the public domain: "Logan, John". Dictionary of National Biography. London: Smith, Elder & Co. 1885–1900.
