= William Cameron (poet) =

Scottish poet and preacher (1751–1811)

William Cameron (1751–1811) was a Scottish poet and minister of the Church of Scotland.

He was born in 1751 and studied at Marischal College, Aberdeen, where he studied under James Beattie. After becoming licensed as a preacher in the Church of Scotland, he was ordained as a minister in the parish of Kirknewton, Midlothian, on 17 August 1786. He collaborated with John Logan and John Morrison in creating a collection of Paraphrases based on the Bible for the Church of Scotland. Cameron authored Paraphrases XIV and XVII for this collection.

During the time when the forfeited estates in the Highlands were being restored, he composed a celebratory song titled As o'er the Highland Hills I hied, which was included in Johnson's Museum to the tune of the traditional melody The Haughs o' Cromdale. In 1790, he anonymously published a Collection of Poems, and in 1793, he wrote a sermon titled The Abuse of Civil and Religious Liberty. Other works by Cameron include the Ode on Lochiel's Birthday (1796), A Review of the French Revolution (1802), Poems on several Occasions (1813), and an account of the Kirknewton parish in John Sinclair's Statistical Accounts of Scotland. His poetry primarily embodies moral and didactic themes.

He died on 17 November 1811.
