= English Review (18th century) =

Magazine

- Editor: Gilbert Stuart
- Categories: English and foreign literature
- Founded: 1783
- Final issue: 1796
- Country: Great Britain
- Based in: London
- Language: English

The English Review was a London literary magazine launched in 1783 by John Murray I, under the full title English Review, or Abstract of English and Foreign Literature. Its editor was Gilbert Stuart.

Initially Stuart wrote much of the Review with William Thomson. He died in 1786. Thomson carried it on, becoming proprietor in 1794. In 1796 the English Review was merged into the Analytical Review.

== Contributors ==
Some notable contributors to the magazine were:

- Thomas Beddoes
- Edmund Cartwright
- James Currie
- William Godwin
- Alexander Hamilton
- John Hellins
- Thomas Holcroft, dramatic criticism in the early numbers
- John Obadiah Justamond
- Robert Liston, foreign literature
- John Logan, Scottish church politics
- John Moore
- John Whitaker
