= George Stuart (classicist) =

Scottish classicist

George Stuart FRSE LLD (1715–18 June 1793) was an 18th-century Scottish classicist. He was joint founder of the Royal Society of Edinburgh in 1783.

== Life ==
From 1741 to 1775 he was Professor of Humanity at the University of Edinburgh also serving as the University Librarian during this period. The humanities course included the teaching of Latin and the study of Roman Antiquities.

In 1773 he was living in private rooms at Old College.

He corresponded with many well-known figures of the period including William Smellie David Steuart Erskine, 11th Earl of Buchan and William Little of Liberton.

He died at Fisherrow in Musselburgh on 18 June 1793.

== Family ==
He was father of Gilbert Stuart (1742-1786) who predeceased him.
