= Hippolytus Lutostansky =

Polish priest (1835–1915)

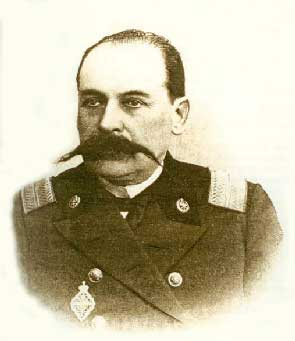
Hippolytus Lutostansky

Hippolytus Lutostansky (1835–1915), also transliterated as Lutostanski, Liutostanskii, J. J. Ljutostanski, Ippolit Iosifovich Lutostanskiĭ; Polish: Hipolit Lutostański, was a former Catholic priest of Polish extraction in the Russian Empire, a convert to the Russian Orthodox Church, and a noted antisemite.

== Biography ==
Talmud and the Jews. vol. 6 cover

He studied and was ordained a Catholic priest in Russia. He was defrocked for alleged offenses, including sexual misconduct, theft and embezzlement, which were later not proven. Thereafter he converted to Russian Orthodoxy and joined a religious academy as a student.

He was famous for writing The Talmud and the Jews (Талмуд и евреи), for which the tzar and his officials awarded him.

== Political claims ==
=== Blood libel ===
About using Christian Blood by the Jews

His books and his public statements claimed blood libel.

=== Jewish plot ===
He maintained that Jews wanted to divide Russia among themselves, once they left the Pale of Settlement, furthering the claims laid in the antisemitic works of Osman Bey (pen name of Frederick van Millingen) The Conquest of the World by the Jews, and contributing to the creation of the Protocols of the Elders of Zion. In 1904 he directly quoted Pavel Krushevan's version; without revision, in an updated edition of his The Talmud and the Jews book. (See main article Cesare G. De Michelis about the versions.)

=== Zionism ===
He declared himself to be a Zionist and proposed that "Russia should make any sacrifice to help the Jews settle in Palestine and form an autonomous state of their own".

=== Racial discrimination ===
To thus pressure Jews to emigrate and to protect state security against Jewish political activists, he proposed racial quotas, segregation, discrimination, disenfranchisement, presaging Nazi policies, and apartheid and anti-immigration legislation:

* All privileges granted to Jews because of their education or because of their occupations should be withdrawn.

* No Jews should be permitted to live in seaports.

* Jewish children should not be permitted to attend schools attended by Christian children.

* Jews should also be prohibited from establishing schools of their own.

* Jews should be forbidden to teach in Government or private schools.

* Jews should not be permitted to hold any Government or civil office.

* Jews should not be permitted to get any concessions and should not be connected with any Government contracts.

* Jews should not be employed on any steamship or railway in Russia.

* Jews should not be permitted to vote, and under no circumstances should they be permitted to serve in the Duma or the Council of the Empire.

* Nor should they be allowed to participate in the elections.

* Jews should not be permitted to have drugstores of their own, to be druggists, or to work as clerks in such stores.

* Jews in any way connected with revolutionists should be dealt with harshly, and their property should be confiscated.

* Jews should not be permitted to act as editors or publishers of periodical publications.

* Jews should not be permitted to have bookstores and printing shops.

* All foreign Jews, citizens of other countries, should be forbidden to enter Russia.

=== British Israelism ===
He also promoted British Israelism:

"The English people are the lost tribes of Israel. The lion of Judah became the emblem of England and the harp of David is to this day the emblem of Ireland.

But not only are the English Kings direct descendants of the Jewish Kings, they even sit on the throne of David, on which all Jewish Kings used to be crowned. The throne is made of the rock on which Jacob slept when he dreamed of the ladder and when God promised him a kingdom. That rock was brought by the prophet Jeremiah to Ireland, whence It was removed first to Scotland and then to London.

North America is settled by the tribe of Manasseh.

The English people in many ways resemble the Jews. Their type is the same, their manner of speech the same, and; above all, the fundamental trait of both nations is trading. Then, the great respect of the English people for the Bible betrays their kinship to the ancient Israelites."

== Recantation ==
At the turn of the century, Lutostansky recanted his previous antisemitic views.

== See also ==
- Pyotr Rachkovsky - Role in the creation of the Protocols of the Elders of Zion
- Cesare G. De Michelis
- Jewish land purchase in Palestine

== Bibliography ==
- О еврейском мессии (1875)
- Объяснение римско-католической мессы или литургии и разбор догматической ее стороны (1875)
- О необходимости воплощения Сына Божия для спасения рода человеческого (1875)
- Учение о Святом Духе в последней беседе Иисуса Христа с учениками (1875)
- Об употреблении евреями талмудистами-сектаторами христианской крови (1876) "About using Christian Blood by the Jews"
- Талмуд и Евреи (1879–80; 1902–1909), "Talmud and the Jews", 7 tomes
- Современный взгляд на еврейский вопрос (Употребляют ли евреи христианскую кровь?) (1882) "Contemporary Question: Do Jews use Christian Blood?"
- Жиды и ритуальные убийства христианских младенцев (1911) "On Jewish Ritual Murders of Christian Youth"
- Антихрист жидовский миссия он же Чернобог (1912) "Anti-Christ Jewish Messiah - He is the Dark God"
- Klier, John D. “German Antisemitism and Russian Judeophobia in the 1880’s: Brothers and Strangers.” Jahrbücher Für Geschichte Osteuropas 37, no. 4 (1989): 524–40. http://www.jstor.org/stable/41052622.
