= Thomas Oldfield =

English political reformer, parliamentary historian and antiquary

Thomas Hinton Burley Oldfield (1755–1822) was an English political reformer, parliamentary historian and antiquary. His major work, The Representative History, has been called "a domesday book of corruption".

== Life ==
He was born in Derbyshire, and reputedly an attorney. During the 1780s he lived in Hoxton Square, east of London. Oldfield joined the Society for Constitutional Information in 1782, when he was proposed by John Jebb and seconded by Thomas Brand Hollis. He was very active with Richard Brocklesby at the time of The Case of the Dean of St Asaph in 1784. Subsequently he joined the Society of Friends of the People. He died at Exeter on 25 July 1822.

== Election management ==
Over a long period, Oldfield operated as an election agent or manager. He was secretary of the Westminster electoral committee in 1780; and again secretary of the Westminster Association in 1783/4. In 1785 he introduced Henry Flood at Seaford. Over numerous procedural difficulties, Flood was elected in 1786.

At East Retford in 1812 Oldfield offered himself as election manager to George Osbaldeston. His candidate was elected, but then refused to settle financially with Oldfield. Oldfield then turned informer on the electoral corruption that had been involved.

== Views ==
Oldfield took the view that participation in deliberation and legislation was an inherent ancient right. In this he had something in common with Gilbert Stuart. This attitude was contested by the British Review in 1818, taking the line that rights had been attained by struggle. Oldfield mixed the concepts of historic right and natural right freely.

== Works ==
Oldfield was a pioneer of parliamentary reform, and the author of:

- An Entire and Complete History, Political and Personal, of the Boroughs of Great Britain, together with the Cinque Ports; to which is prefixed an original Sketch of constitutional rights from the earliest Period until the present Time, London, 1792, 3 vols.; 2nd ed. 1794, 2 vols. George Tierney's work State of the Representation on parliamentary representation was largely based on this work.
- History of the Original Constitution of Parliaments from the Time of the Britons to the present Day; to which is added the present State of the Representation, London, 1797.

Both works were subsequently reprinted under the title A Complete History, Political and Personal, of the Boroughs of Great Britain, together with the Cinque Ports; To which is now first added the History of the Original Constitution of Parliaments, &c., London (no date), 3 vols. A final edition, revised and amplified, entitled The Representative History of Great Britain and Ireland; being a History of the House of Commons, and of the Counties, Cities, and Boroughs of the United Kingdom from the earliest Period, appeared in 1816, London, 6 vols.

Oldfield also compiled A Key to the House of Commons, being a History of the last General Election in 1818; and a correct State of the virtual Representation of England and Wales, London, 1820.

== Notes ==
Attribution

This article incorporates text from a publication now in the public domain: Lee, Sidney, ed. (1895). "Oldfield, Thomas Hinton Burley". Dictionary of National Biography. Vol. 42. London: Smith, Elder & Co.
