= Blachernitissa =

7th-century Byzantine icon of the Virgin Mary

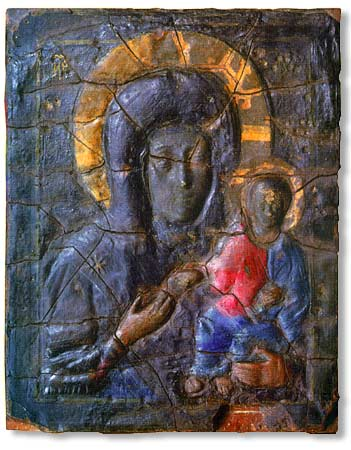
The icon of the Theotokos kept in Moscow since 1653 and considered to be the Blachernitissa (46 × 37,5 × 4 cm; Tretyakov Gallery)

Blachernitissa (Greek: Βλαχερνίτισσα), also called Theotokos of Blachernae (Θεοτόκος των Βλαχερνών, Θεοτόκος η Βλαχερνίτισσα) or Our Lady of Blachernae (Παναγία η Βλαχερνίτισσα), is a 7th-century encaustic icon representing the Most Holy Theotokos and Ever-Virgin Mary. It is also the name given to the Church built in honour of the Virgin Mary in the Blachernae section of Constantinople. The name Blachernae possibly derived from the name of a Vlach (sometimes written as Blach or Blasi), who came to Constantinople from the lower Danube.

== Byzantine palladium ==
The Theotokos was considered to be the intercessory protectress par excellence of Constantinople and, indeed, of the entire Eastern Roman Empire (also called "Byzantium" by some Western scholars, a name developed during the renaissance). Blachernitissa is unusual among Orthodox icons in that it is not flat, but is formed in bas relief. According to Sacred Tradition, the icon Blachernitissa was made of wax combined with the ashes of Christian martyrs who had been killed in the 6th century. The Church of St. Mary of Blachernae (which hosted the icon) was sited close to the Blachernae imperial palace.

== Reappearance ==
The icon was believed to have been lost after the fire that destroyed the church on February 29, 1434, although in later centuries its disappearance came to be associated with the fall of Constantinople in 1453. Like many holy objects of Byzantine tradition, the Blachernitissa (or a copy thereof) resurfaced on Mount Athos in the mid-17th century.

Whether it is the same icon that was kept in Blachernae is a matter of scholarly debate, as the ancient icon is believed to have been of the Orans type, whereas the Athonite icon is of a style called Hodegetria (literally, "She who leads the way"). It has been suggested that the Athonite icon had its origins in the Blachernae quarter and perhaps even resided in the Church of St. Mary before being transferred to Mount Athos for "security reasons".

It was in 1653 that the icon was sent by the Athonite monks to Moscow as their gift to Tsar Alexis. A Constantinople merchant, Demetrios Costinari, brought it to Moscow on October 16, 1653, with a letter from Patriarch Paisius I that endorsed the icon's authenticity. He was met by the Tsar in person, and Alexis had the icon enshrined in Moscow's main church, the Dormition Cathedral, opposite Russia's protectress, the Theotokos of Vladimir.

== Veneration in Muscovy ==
Paul of Aleppo, who accompanied the Patriarch of Antioch to Moscow in early 1655, was impressed by the reverence in which the icon was held. According to his account, the Blachernitissa appears as "if she had a bodily form" and "it stands out against the background so strongly", that the viewer is penetrated with awe. It was encased in a sumptuous chasuble glittering with gold and precious stones, so that only the hands and the face of the Theotokos were left visible. Paul proceeds to describe how the Tsar had it placed in front of his own seat in a sledge and took it with him on the Smolensk campaign.

The 1650s were a time when the Russian Church, steered by Patriarch Nikon, began to place great store on renewing its ties with the older members of the Pentarchy. This emphasis dovetailed neatly with the prevailing Third Rome doctrine which saw Moscow as the successor to Constantinople. With this in mind, the metochion sent the newly recovered Byzantine relic to Moscow and was "handsomely remunerated" with 800 dinars from the Tsar's coffers.

== Study and restoration ==
When placed in the Kremlin, the icon was in disrepair from old age and use, so that Simon Ushakov and Nikita Pavlovets had to be summoned for "repairs" in 1674. Nikodim Kondakov was unable to determine the icon's age due to this and later restorations, which involved some amount of overpainting, but felt reasonably certain that "the composition was of ancient date".

The carved high relief icon has similarities to a set of 13th-century icons of St. George from the Crimea, Ohrid, and Castoria. An original Greek inscription recently discovered under the coat of wax paints has a parallel in a lead seal from a Trapezunt monastery, also datable to the 13th century. Thus the 13th century seems to be emerging as the most likely date for the icon.

== Replicas ==
The Blachernitissa never rose to the height of veneration accorded by the Russian Orthodox Church to the Theotokos of Kazan or even to the Theotokos of the Iveron, an Athonite icon whose copy was commissioned by Patriarch Nikon. After Nikon's downfall and Alexis's death, the icon was neglected so much that it was not evacuated from the Kremlin during Napoleon's occupation and was put at risk during the Great Fire of 1812.

== See also ==
- Theotokos of Vladimir
- The Black Madonna of Czestochowa
- Our Lady of Kazan
