= John G. Millingen =

British army surgeon and writer (1782–1862)

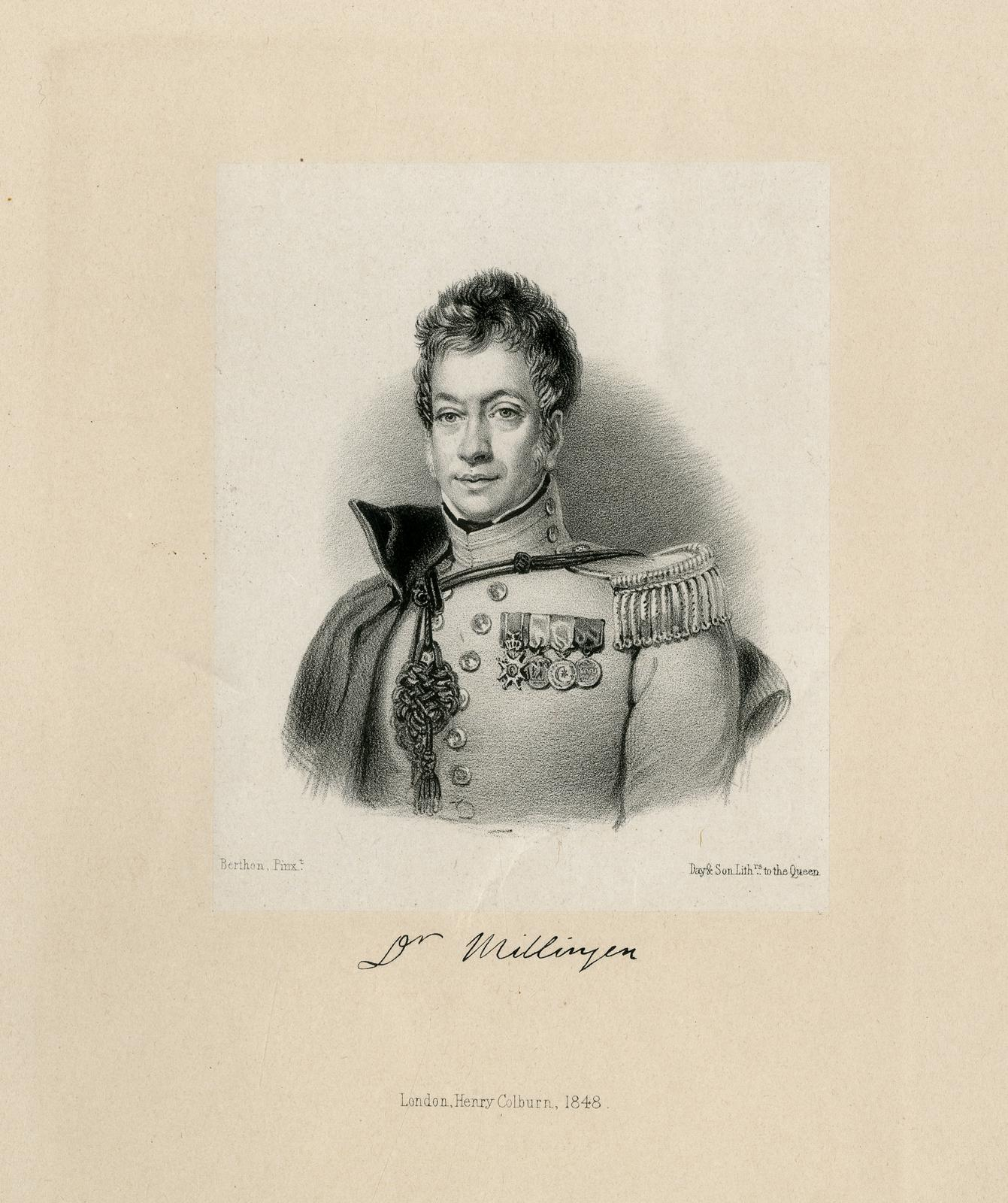
John Gideon Millingen

John Gideon Millingen (1782–1862) was a British army surgeon and writer. He was the brother of James Millingen and an uncle of Julius Michael Millingen.

== Biography ==
Born in Westminster to parents of Dutch descent, Millingen was educated in Paris where he achieved his medical degree. He became an assistant surgeon in the British Army in 1802, serving with the Queen's Own German Regiment in the Peninsular War, and won a medal at Waterloo and the surrender of Paris. He retired in 1823 and was appointed as a physician to the military asylum at Chatham and Hanwell. By 1836. he was living in Covent Garden, London.

== Works ==
- The Bee-hive (1818), a musical farce
- Ladies at Home, or Gentlemen, We Can Do Without You (1819)
- Sketches of Ancient and Modern Boulogne (1826) (Prose)
- Adventures of an Irish Gentleman, 3 vol. (1830)
- The Illustrious Stranger, or Married and Buried (1827)
- Who'll Lend Me a Wife? (1834)
- The Miser's Daughter (1835)
- Borrowed Feathers (1836)
- Curiosities of Medical Experience (1837)
- Stories of Torres Vedras, 3 vol. (1839)
- The History of Duelling (1841)
- Recollections of Republican France from 1790 to 1801 (1848)
