= Fleetwood Churchill =

English Physician

Fleetwood Churchill M.D. (1808–1878) was an English physician, known as an obstetrician and medical writer.

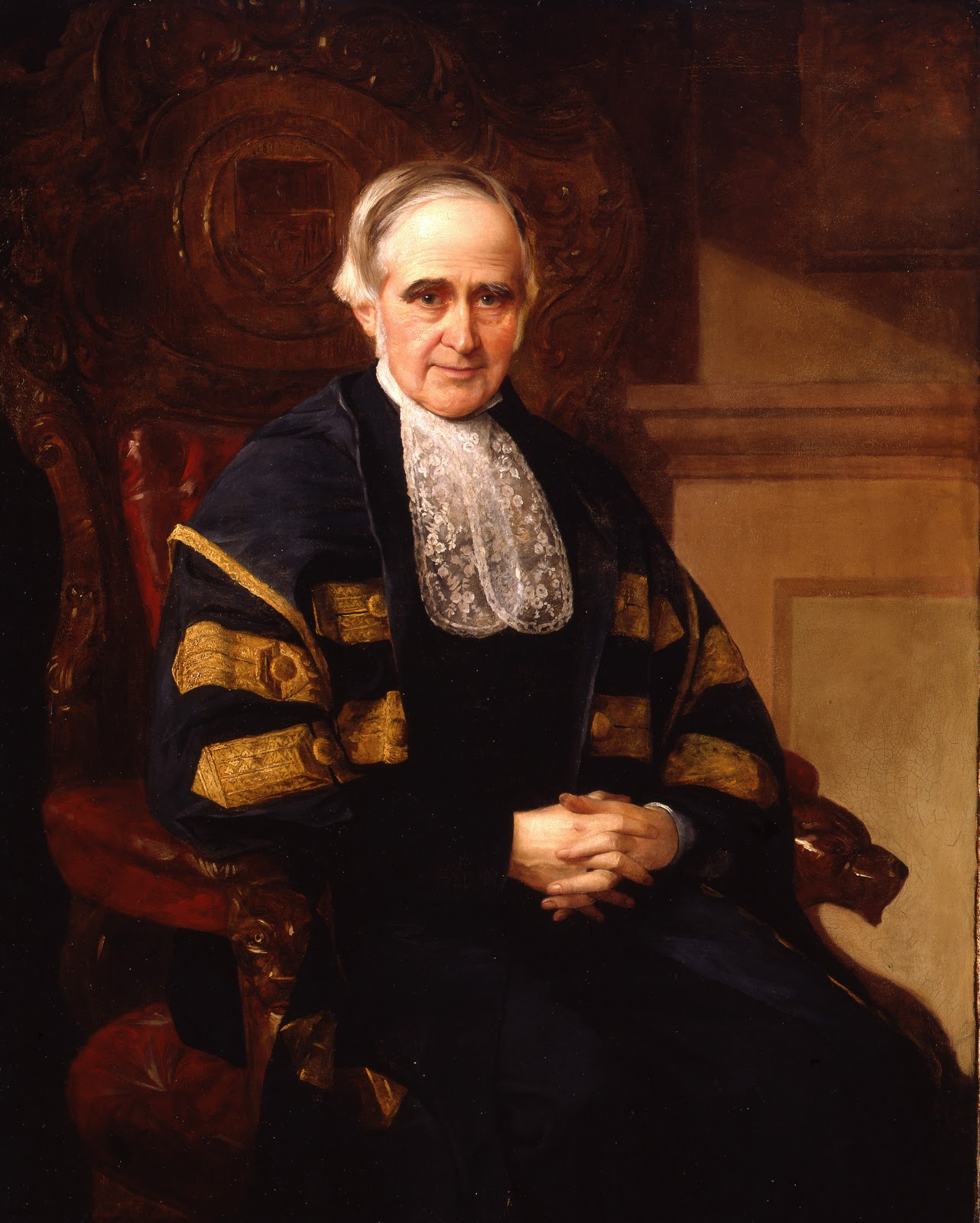
Fleetwood Churchill

== Life ==
Churchill was born at Nottingham, where his businessman father died when he was three years old, and he was educated by his mother. He was apprenticed to a general practitioner at Nottingham in 1822, and then studied in London, Dublin, Paris, and Edinburgh, where he graduated M.D. in 1831. He went in 1832 to Dublin to study midwifery, and set up in practice there.

Having become a licentiate of the King and Queen's College of Physicians, Churchill was involved in establishing a small maternity hospital (the Western, cf Rotunda Hospital), and instructed students in midwifery there. He was by then married, and entered on a successful career as teacher, writer, and practitioner: his income reached £3,000 a year. In 1851 an honorary degree of M.D. was conferred upon him by Trinity College, Dublin; he was king's professor of midwifery in the School of Physic from 1856 to 1864; he was twice president of the Obstetrical Society of Dublin, in 1856 and 1864; and he was president of the King and Queen's College of Physicians in 1867–8.

Churchill was a religious man, as member of the Church of Ireland, and after the Irish Church Act 1869 was involved in the Church's reorganisation. He was a supporter of foreign missions, and was also a sanitary reformer in Dublin, a founder in 1850 of the Sanitary Association. About two years and a half before his death, in failing health, he retired, presented his obstetrical library to the Ireland College of Physicians, left Dublin, and lived at the house of his daughter and son-in-law at Ardtrea rectory, near Stewartstown, County Tyrone. Here, after a short illness, and within a month of completing his seventieth year, he died, 31 January 1878.

== Works ==
Churchill wrote successful medical works. The major ones were:

- Diseases of Females, 1838.
- Diseases incident to Pregnancy and Childbed, 1840.
- Operative Midwifery, 1841.
- Theory and Practice of Midwifery, 1842.
- A volume of monographs on Diseases of Women, edited for the Sydenham Society, 1849.
- Diseases of Children, 1850.

His Manual for Midwives went to five editions, and had an 1893 revision by Thomas More Madden, as Handbook of Obstetric and Gynaecological Nursing.

== Notes ==
Attribution

This article incorporates text from a publication now in the public domain: Stephen, Leslie, ed. (1887). "Churchill, Fleetwood". Dictionary of National Biography. Vol. 10. London: Smith, Elder & Co.
