= Gilbert Stuart (writer) =

Scottish journalist and historian

Gilbert Stuart (1742–1786) was a Scottish journalist and historian.

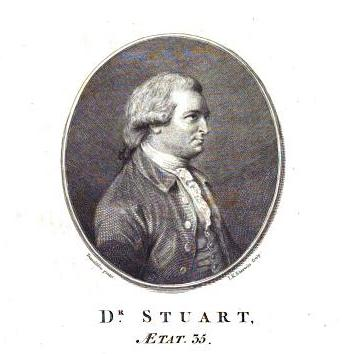
Gilbert Stuart, engraving by John Keyse Sherwin after John Donaldson

== Early life ==
He was born in Edinburgh, the only surviving son of George Stuart (1715-1793), professor of the Latin language and Roman antiquities in Edinburgh University.

Gilbert was educated at the High School in Edinburgh and then studied Classics and Philosophy at Edinburgh University, followed by a course in jurisprudence there; but he never followed the law as profession.

== Journalist ==
In 1768 Stuart went to London, hoping for preferment through Lord Mansfield. In 1769 he lodged with Thomas Somerville in the house of Murdoch the bookseller, writing for the newspapers and reviews. He worked for the Monthly Review from 1768 to 1773. By June 1773 Stuart was back with his father at Musselburgh, working to launch the Edinburgh Magazine and Review. The first number came out about the middle of October 1773, and it was discontinued after the publication of the number for August 1776. In the end, an article by Stuart and Alexander Gillies, written over the protests of William Smellie, attacked Lord Monboddo's Origin and Progress of Language over several numbers. The magazine was stopped.

Stuart was a critic of the historian William Robertson, who was the leader of the Moderates in the Church of Scotland. In his view, instead of supporting Catholic toleration, Robertson should have been more assertive in defending the interests of the Kirk. In 1778 Stuart was an unsuccessful candidate for the professorship of public law at the University of Edinburgh, and he believed that Robertson was responsible for his failure. Stuart nursed his resentment of Robertson over this supposed intervention. In 1785 William Robertson, eldest son of the historian, fought a duel with Stuart, which both survived.

In 1782 Stuart settled once more in London, and went back to reviewing. The English Review was established by John Murray I in January 1783, and Stuart was one of the principal writers on its staff. During 1785–6 he edited, with William Thomson (1746–1817), twelve numbers of The Political Herald and Review. It opened with a criticism of Pitt's administration, which was still not finished in the final number, and dealt out severe addresses to Henry Dundas and several other Pittites. These diatribes may have prompted the suggestion that Stuart was Junius.

== Death ==
Stuart would spend whole nights drinking in company at the Peacock in Gray's Inn Lane, London. He died at his father's house at Fisherrow in Musselburgh on 13 August 1786.

== Works ==
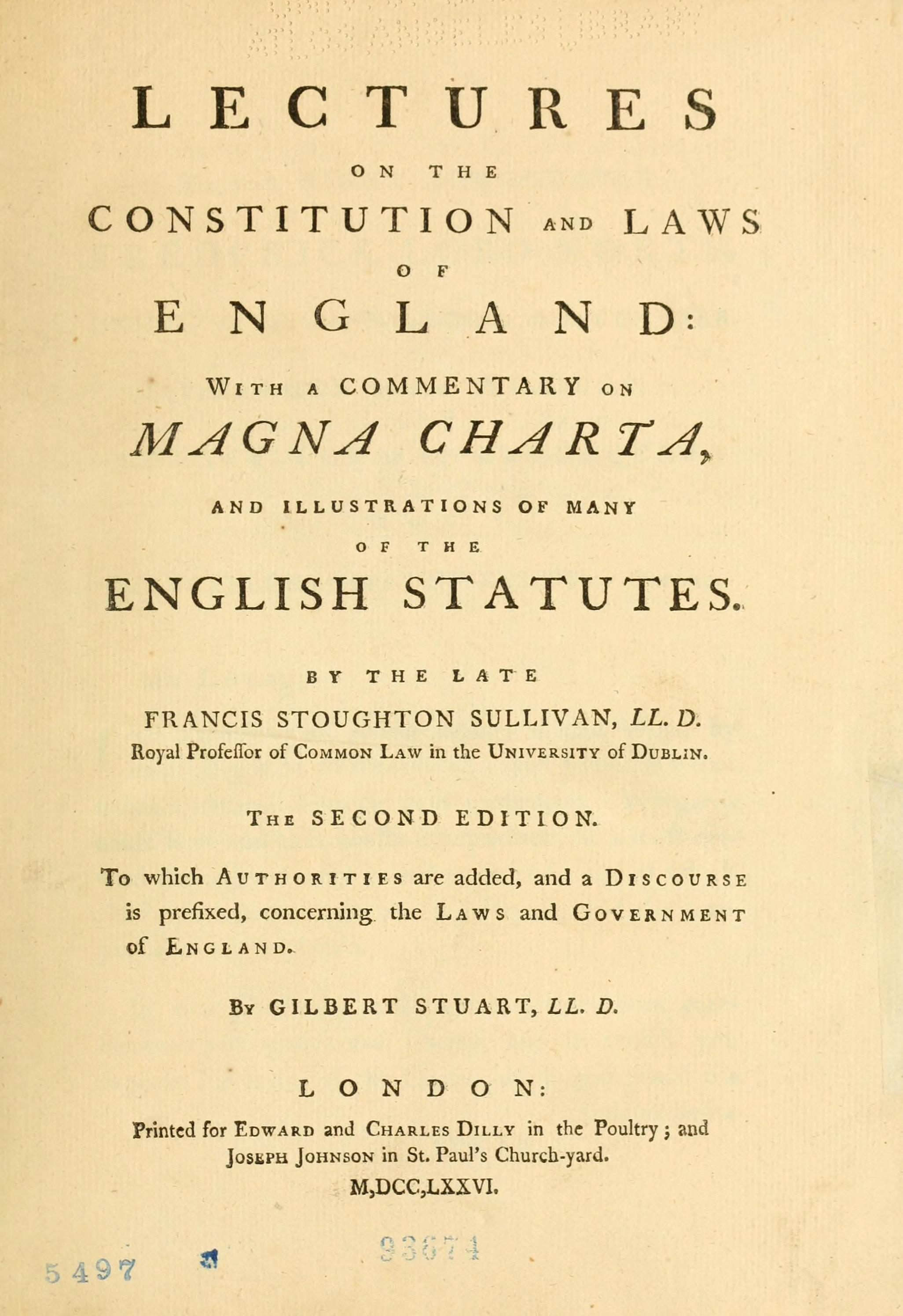
To the second English edition of Francis Stoughton Sullivan's Lectures on the Constitution and Laws of England (1776), Stuart added authorities and a discourse on the laws and government of England

Stuart initially supplied corrections and amendments to the Gospel History (1765) of the Rev. Robert Wait. His first independent work was the anonymous Historical Dissertation on the Antiquity of the English Constitution (1768) in which he traced English institutions to a German source. The second edition, which came out in January 1770, with a dedication to Lord Mansfield, bore Stuart's name on the title-page, and it was republished in 1778 and 1790. For this work he received from Edinburgh University on 16 November 1769 the degree of doctor of law.

While based in London Stuart supervised the manuscripts of Nathaniel Hooke. From them he finished the fourth volume of Hooke's Roman History. which was published in 1771. After this Stuart temporarily abandoned review-writing for the study of philosophy and history. He appended in 1776 to the second edition of Francis Stoughton Sullivan's Lectures on the Constitution and Laws of England the authorities for the statements and a discourse on the government and laws of our country, and dedicated the volume to Lord North; the whole work was reissued at Portland, Maine, in 1805.

Stuart's major work, A View of Society in Europe, was published in 1778, and reprinted in 1782, 1783, 1792, and 1813, and a French translation by Antoine-Marie-Henri Boulard, came out in Paris in 1789, in two volumes. Letters from William Blackstone and Alexander Garden were added to the posthumous edition of 1792 by Stuart's father. In this dissertation Stuart followed Montesquieu. As a contributor to medievalism he is considered a pioneer, sharing with Thomas Hinton Burley Oldfield the conception of early Anglo-Saxon society as harbouring democratic habits.

In 1779 Stuart brought out, with a dedication to Lord Mount Stuart, Observations on the Public Law and Constitutional History of Scotland; and in 1780 he published his History of the Establishment of the Reformation in Scotland (reissued in 1796 and 1805). It was followed in 1782 by The History of Scotland from the Establishment of the Reformation till the Death of Queen Mary, which had a second edition in 1784, when he added to it his Observations on the Public Law of Scotland. These works were written with a narrative in the "balancing style" adopted from Samuel Johnson and Edward Gibbon. Stuart trailed his coat for Robertson, whom he openly challenged to reply to his defence of Queen Mary. Robertson retorted with a charge of plagiarism. The anonymous pamphlet Critical Observations Concerning the Scottish Historians Hume, Stuart, and Robertson (1782), sometimes attributed to Stuart himself, was at least by a friend or ally. It was slapped down by William Enfield in the Monthly Review.

Stuart did have a public ally in David Erskine, 11th Earl of Buchan, who made a point of praising him in a speech at the founding of the Society of Antiquaries of Scotland, in 1780. Stuart's Whig views were not unacceptable to Buchan. Another historian on the Whig side, whom Stuart found tolerable, was Sir John Dalrymple of Cousland.
