= Julius Michael Millingen =

English physician and archaeologist

Julius Michael Millingen (1800–1878) was an English physician and writer. He was one of the doctors treating Lord Byron at his death.

== Life ==
He was born in London on 19 July 1800, a son of James Millingen. He spent his early years in Calais and Paris, and was sent to school in Rome. In holidays he took walking tours in Germany, on one of which he is said to have visited Goethe in Weimar. In 1817 he entered the University of Edinburgh, and attended medical classes there until 1821, when he received a diploma from the Royal College of Surgeons of Edinburgh.

When the London Philhellenic Committee was formed, Millingen was recommended to it by William Smith, and on 27 August 1823 he left England for Corfu, with letters of introduction to the Greek government and to Lord Byron. Arriving at Asos in Cephalonia in November of that year, he found Byron at Metaxata, and spent some time with him there. He later accompanied him to Missolonghi, and attended him in his last illness, which, at the autopsy, Millingen pronounced to be purulent meningitis. He was accused by Francesco Bruno, another of Byron's doctors, in an article in the Westminster Review, with having caused his death by delaying phlebotomy. Millingen replied at length in his Memoirs. A modern view is that both doctors were culpable in Byron's death, for their use of bloodletting.

Soon after Byron's death in 1824, Millingen had a severe attack of typhoid fever; on recovering he was appointed surgeon in the Greek army, in which he served until its surrender to the Turks. On 31 March 1825, he was appointed surgeon of the Neokastro garrison which at the time was undergoing a siege by Egyptian troops. He was taken prisoner by Ibrahim Pasha, and released only after representations by Stratford Canning, then British ambassador to the Sublime Porte. In November 1826 Millingen went to Smyrna, and after a short stay in Kutaya and Broussa, settled in 1827 in Constantinople. There he attained a reputation as a physician.

Millingen was also court physician to Mahmud II and his four successors as Sultan; he was one of a commission appointed to inquire into the death of Sultan Abdulaziz. He was also a member of the International Medical Congress on Cholera held in Constantinople in 1866, and an original member and afterwards president of the General Society of Medicine.

In 1858, Millingen wrote an article on oriental baths for a French medical journal, an English translation of which later appeared in The Free Press as part of an issue largely devoted to what is now known as the Victorian Turkish bath. At that time the paper was owned by David Urquhart and financed by Richard Crawshay, both soon to become involved in the building of the Hammam Turkish Bath at 76 Jermyn Street, London. (Note: Although the bath was called a Hammam, and was designed internally to look like an Islamic hammam, it was, like all the baths associated with Urquhart, a Victorian Turkish bath constructed to use dry air only. The atmosphere throughout was dry and there was no steam room until early in the 20th century.) Crawshay wrote asking Millingen for advice and was sent a further article with two illustrations which may have provided some input to the design of The Hammam.

Like his father, Millingen was an archæologist. For many years he was president of the Greek Syllogos or Literary Society of Constantinople, where he lectured in Greek on archæological subjects. He discovered the ruins of Aczani in Phrygia, an account of which was published by George Thomas Keppel, and excavated the site of the temple of Jupiter Urius on the Bosphorus.

In a major fire at Pera in 1870, Millingen lost most of his belongings, and a manuscript biography of Byron. He died in Constantinople on 1 December 1878.

== Works ==
Millingen published:

- Memoirs of the Affairs of Greece, with Anecdotes relating to Lord Byron, London, 1831, vol. i. only (vol. ii. remained in manuscript). Its publication involved him in controversy with Edward John Trelawny.
- Arbitrary Detention by the Inquisition at Rome of three Protestant Children in Defiance of the Will of their Father, London, 1842.

He also contributed an article in French on "Oriental Baths" to the Gazette Médicale d'Orient, 1 January 1858.

== Family ==
Millingen separated from his first wife Marie Angélique Dejean (1812–1873), a Roman Catholic who then embraced Islam, and was married twice. She married, secondly, Kıbrıslı Mehmed Emin Pasha.

The children of the first marriage included:

- A daughter, Evelin or Evelina (1831–1900), who married Count Almorò Pisani. Henry James wrote in a letter that she "makes one believe in the romantic heroines of D'Israeli and Bulwer".
- Frederick van Millingen (1833/34–c.1901), the second son, took the name Osman Bey and joined the Ottoman army; and later called himself Vladimir Andrejevitch. He was in the Ottoman service 1853 to 1864, but clashed with Fuad Pasha.
- James R. van Millingen (Constantinople, 1835; id. 1876), who became the Director of Ottoman Telegraphs

The children of the second marriage included:

- Alexander van Millingen (1840–1915), the third son.
- Charles [van] Millingen (Constantinople, 1842 – Tehran, 1880) and John [van] Millingen (Constantinople, 1842 – 1844), twin brothers

The children of the third marriage included:

- Julius Robertson van Millingen (Constantinople, 22 November 1848 – Dunblane, Scotland, 16 November 1940)
- Edwin [van] Millingen (Constantinople, 30 April 1850 – Constantinople, 7 April 1900), who was an oculist in Eastern Europe.

Marie Millingen, née Dejean, took the name Melek Hanum. She was divorced by her second husband, and wrote an autobiography, Thirty Years in the Harem (1872).
