= Evelina van Millingen =

Hostess, a cultivator of gardens, and a novelist

Evelina van Millingen (4 April 1831 – 25 June 1900), also known as Evelina Millingen and later as Evelina, Countess Pisani, was an Englishwoman born in Constantinople, and known as a hostess, a cultivator of gardens, and a novelist, based in northern Italy.

== Early life ==
Evelina van Millingen was born in Constantinople, the eldest child of Julius Michael Millingen and his first wife, Marie Dejean Millingen (a Frenchwoman later called "Melek Hanum"). Her younger brother was Byzantine scholar Alexander van Millingen. Her father was an English-born doctor who attended Lord Byron on his deathbed at Missolonghi. Evelina was raised mainly in her grandmother's household in Rome. Strong disagreement over Evelina's and her brothers' educational placements and religious upbringing precipitated their parents' divorce.

== Work ==
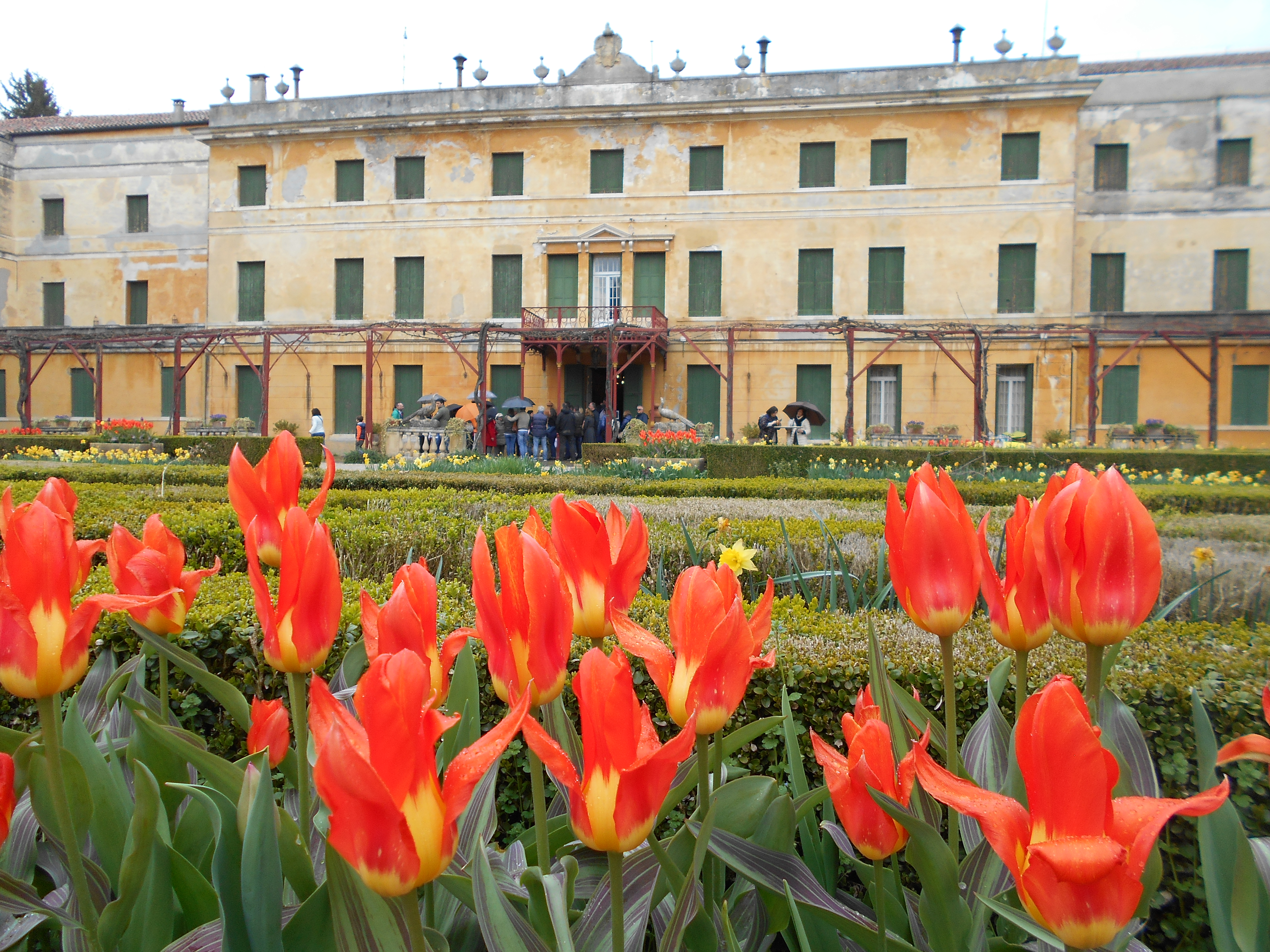
A tulip garden, first introduced by Evelina, Countess Pisani, still maintained at Villa Pisani (Vescovana)

Upon assuming her role as countess at the Villa Pisani in 1852, Evelina focused on creating extensive formal gardens on the grounds of the villa in Vescovana. Her gardens reflected her English and her Turkish influences. She also commissioned the family chapel on the grounds, built in 1860 and designed by sculptor Antonio Gradenigo. She hosted international travelers at the villa, including Henry James and Augusta, Lady Gregory.

== Personal life ==
Evelina van Millingen married Count Almorò III Pisani in 1852, in Venice. She was widowed when he died in 1886, and, because they were childless, the Pisani family of Santo Stefano ended with his death. Evelina, the last Countess Pisani, died in the summer of 1900, aged 68 years, in Italy. The family's former villa in Vescovana, now an inn, encourages visitors to look and listen for Evelina's ghost haunting her gardens. An event every spring, "I Bulbi di Evelina Pisani", celebrates the blooming of her tulip gardens.

== Bibliography ==
- Judith Harris, Evelina: a Victorian heroine in Venice, Stroud (UK) : Fonthill Media, 2017. ISBN 978-1781555934.
