= Alexander van Millingen =

American historian

Alexander van Millingen DD (1840–1915) was a scholar in the field of Byzantine architecture, and a professor of history at Robert College, Istanbul between 1879 and 1915. His works are now public domain in many jurisdictions.

== Life ==
He was born in Constantinople the third son of Dr Julius Michael Millingen, court physician to the Sultan, and his wife Zafira Ralli. He was educated at the Protestant College on the island of Malta and then at Blair Lodge Academy at Polmont in central Scotland. He then took a general degree at the University of Edinburgh graduating with a BA in 1861 and an MA in 1862. He then studied divinity at New College, Edinburgh qualifying in 1866. He was then licensed by the Presbytery of the Free Church of Scotland at Dunkeld.

Having a clear wanderlust he was ordained at the Scottish Church in Genoa in north Italy in 1868. He stayed one year before being translated to Pera on the outskirts of Constantinople. He was appointed Professor of English Literature at Robert's College in the city in 1878.

He received the honorary degree Doctor of divinity (DD) from the University of St Andrews in March 1903.

He died at Jervis Wood in Tunbridge Wells in Kent on 7 September 1915.

== Family ==
He married twice in later life. In July 1879 he married Antoinette Cora Welch, widow of Truman Thomson, of Newhaven, Connecticut. She died at sea in November 1892. In September 1895 he married Frances Elizabeth Hope Mackenzie at St Mary's Cathedral in Edinburgh. She was the daughter of Henry Somerset Mackenzie (b.1870), a judge in the East India Company. Thirty years his junior she lived at 16 Moray Place on the Moray Estate at the time of the marriage. She died in 1929 in Barnet, London. They had three sons.

His sister was Evelina van Millingen, later the Countess Pisani.

== Selected publications ==
- Byzantine Constantinople: the walls of the city and adjoining historical sites. London: J. Murray. 1899. LCCN 02007428.
- Constantinople, painted by Warwick Goble, described by Alexander van Millingen. London: A. & C. Black. 1906. ISBN 978-1-4655-2780-6. LCCN 06045156.
- Byzantine churches in Constantinople: their history and architecture. London: Macmillan. 1912. ISBN 978-0-902089-72-3. LCCN 13000463.
