= Edinburgh Magazine and Review =

Scottish periodical (1773-1776)

The Edinburgh Magazine and Review was a Scottish periodical, published monthly from 1773 to 1776. It was founded by Gilbert Stuart, who pursued an aggressive editorial line that eventually led to the magazine's demise.

== History ==
The first number came out about the middle of October 1773, and it was discontinued after the publication of the number for August 1776. Early advantages were negated by Stuart's tendency to pursue private vendettas against lawyers and other historians; William Smellie the printer struggled to contain him. Stuart's slashing article on the Elements of Criticism by Lord Kames, was completely metamorphosed by Smellie. Stuart sometimes had his own way: when David Hume reviewed and praised the second volume of Robert Henry's History of Great Britain, the article was cancelled and one by Stuart substituted for it, which went the other extreme. Behind Smellie was William Creech, who launched a number of periodicals.

The climax was reached in an article by Stuart and A. Gillies, written over the protests of Smellie, on Lord Monboddo's Origin and Progress of Language. It was scurrilous and abusive, ran through several numbers of the fifth volume, and caused the magazine to be stopped.

== Contributors ==
The major writers, in addition to Stuart, were William Richardson of Glasgow, William Baron, Thomas Blacklock, Rev. Alexander Gillies, and Smellie.

== Notes ==
Attribution

This article incorporates text from a publication now in the public domain: "Stuart, Gilbert (1742-1786)". Dictionary of National Biography. London: Smith, Elder & Co. 1885–1900.

== See also ==
- Edinburgh Review
- The Edinburgh Magazine and Review archive at HathiTrust
