= Beckwith Company =

Publishing entity in 1920, based in New York

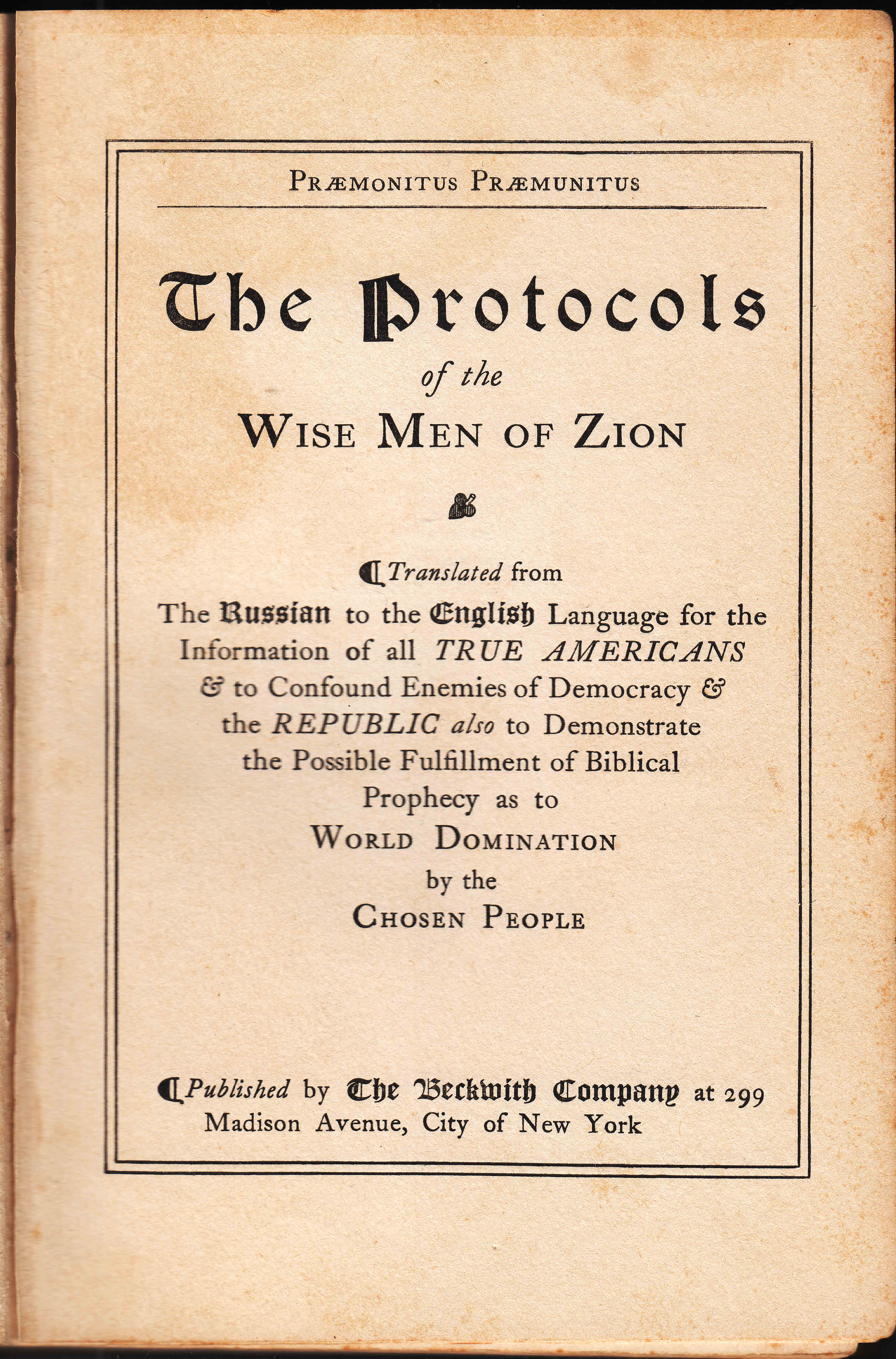
Title page of Praemonitus Praemunitus, New York: The Beckwith Company, 1920

The Beckwith Company was a publishing entity in 1920, based in New York City. It is remembered for publishing a second edition of the forged Protocols of the Elders of Zion, more specifically a second translation from the Russian language into the English language.

== The Beckwith edition of the Protocols of the Elders of Zion ==
The meaning of the lead title is the expression, "Praemonitus praemunitus," a Latin saying which means "forewarned is forearmed." The anonymous editor of this edition was Harris A. Houghton. The translation was by his personal assistant Miss de Bogory and former Russian General G. J. Sosnowsky.

The pseudonym under which this imprint was published, "Peter Beckwith," is believed to be Harris A. Houghton, suggesting further that "The Beckwith Company" was merely a front for Houghton to get his new translation of The Protocols of the Elders of Zion published. This publishing entity was a front created specifically in order to provide a publishing company willing and able to publish and distribute the Protocols. Support and/or financing for this publication came is believed to have come from the American Defense Society.

| LC Control No.: | 21001311 |
| Type of Material: | Book (Print, Microform, Electronic, etc.) |
| Uniform Title: | "Protocols of the wise men of Zion." [from old catalog] |
| Main Title: | Præmonitus præmunitus. The protocols of the wise men of Zion, translated from the Russian to the English language for the information of all true Americans & to confound enemies of democracy & the republic, also to demonstrate the possible fulfillment of Biblical prophecy as to world domination by the Chosen people. |
| Published/Created: | New York, The Beckwith company, 1920. |
| Related Names: | Nilus, Serg-Y-Eief. [from old catalog] |
| Description: | 2 p.l., iii-vii 165 p. front., 4 facsim. 21 cm. |
| Subjects: | Jews. Communism. |
| LC Classification: | DS145 .P5 1920a |

== Other books published by Beckwith ==
There are fewer than half a dozen imprints associated with the "Beckwith" label in libraries.

| LC Control No.: | 25009159 |
| Type of Material: | Book (Print, Microform, Electronic, etc.) |
| Personal Name: | Webster, Nesta Helen. |
| Main Title: | Boche and bolshevik, |
| Published/Created: | New York city, The Beckwith company, 1923. |
| Related Names: | Kerlen, Kurt. [from old catalog] Peter Beckwith|Beckwith, Peter, pseud. [from old catalog] |
| Description: | 4 p. l., 82 p. 19 cm. |
| Subjects: | Communism--Russia. [from old catalog] Propaganda, German. [from old catalog] |
| LC Classification: | DK265 .W34 |

The author, Nesta H. Webster, is said to have been involved in the promotion of the Protocols of Zion.

Another known work by this entity is Sales Letters for Salesmen. But publisher is located in Dowagiac, Mich. The publisher is styled "The Beckwith Company" and the copyright year is given as 1922. The author provided is Edward G. Weir.

== See also ==
- Boris Brasol
- Cause of World Unrest
- Protocols of the Elders of Zion (versions)
- Serge Nilus
- Warrant for Genocide
