= Natalie de Bogory =

Russian translator (1887–1939)

Natalie de Bogory (also known as Natalie Debogory or Natalie DeBogory-Mokriyevich) (1887–1939) is primarily known for her work in translating from the Russian language into the English language, and subsequently distributing and participating in having published the first or second American edition in the United States of the document known as the Protocols of the Elders of Zion. There were two different editions printed in the United States in 1920. The earlier, entitled The Protocols and World Revolution, associated with Boris Brasol and published by Small, Maynard and Company. The later, entitled Praemonitus Praemunitus associated with Harris A. Houghton and published by the Beckwith Company.

== Biography ==
She was the granddaughter of two servicemen of the tsar of Russia. One of her grandfathers resigned being a colonel-lieutenant, another one was a major. Her father Vladimir Karpovich Debogory-Mokriyevich (May 24, 1848 – November 2, 1926) had been imprisoned under the tsarist government for revolutionary activities. He was a well-known Russian Revolutionary-Narodnik (Populist), who escaped from prison in Siberia and later married her mother Julie Gortynsky (1860 -1933?) in Switzerland.

Julie was from a noble family and educated at the Kiev Institute for noble girls. (The Gortynsky family produced many well educated women: Julie's cousin, Maria Gortynsky-Pavlova (1854–1938), was the first Russian female professor of Paleontology at the Academy of Sciences of the USSR; another cousin, Olga Gortynsky (1855–1903), was among the first Russian women licensed to practice as a Doctor of Medicine.) Upon graduation Julie studied in Paris and Geneva.

Natalie was born in Geneva on April 15, 1887 and was in Russia a few times until 1895 when her mother Julie was exiled Russia with no permission to return due to her unreliability and close ties with emigre Vladimir Debogory-Mokrievich. After Nicholas II's amnesty of 1905 Julie returned to Russia and Natalie never saw her mother again. Natalie married Albert Sonnichsen, a writer, had one child Eric in 1909, then divorced him in 1919. Eventually she moved to Paris after losing custody of her son in a very public legal fight, and she worked as Sol Hurok's publicity person in Europe. She eventually became a Paris based writer for the International Herald Tribune. She died in 1939 in Paris, and her ashes are interred in vault no. 4780 in the columbarium at Père Lachaise Cemetery in Paris.

She worked as the assistant of the physician and military intelligence officer in the service of the U.S. War Department, Harris Ayers Houghton, who paid for her services out of his own private funds. Houghton engaged her as his personal and investigative assistant for nine months, and subsequently claimed that no public funds were used for her services. She had obtained a Russian version of the Protocols of Zion from the notorious White Russian and extremely antisemitic tsarist officer Boris Brasol, and thereafter she requested, under her own initiative and received authorization to translate it into the English language. She did not work alone, but with close consultation with Brasol, and another former tsarist officer, General G. J. Sosnowsky.

== See also ==
- Harris A. Houghton
- Sergei Nilus
