= Harris A. Houghton =

American soldier and translator of the Protocols of Zion

Harris Ayres Houghton (February 25, 1874 – September 2, 1946) was a physician and member of the United States military intelligence community during and shortly after World War I. He is notable for having arranged the anonymous translation, from the Russian language into the English language, publication and dissemination, of the notoriously antisemitic Protocols of the Elders of Zion in the United States in 1920. The lead title he was responsible for producing was "Praemonitus Praemunitus."

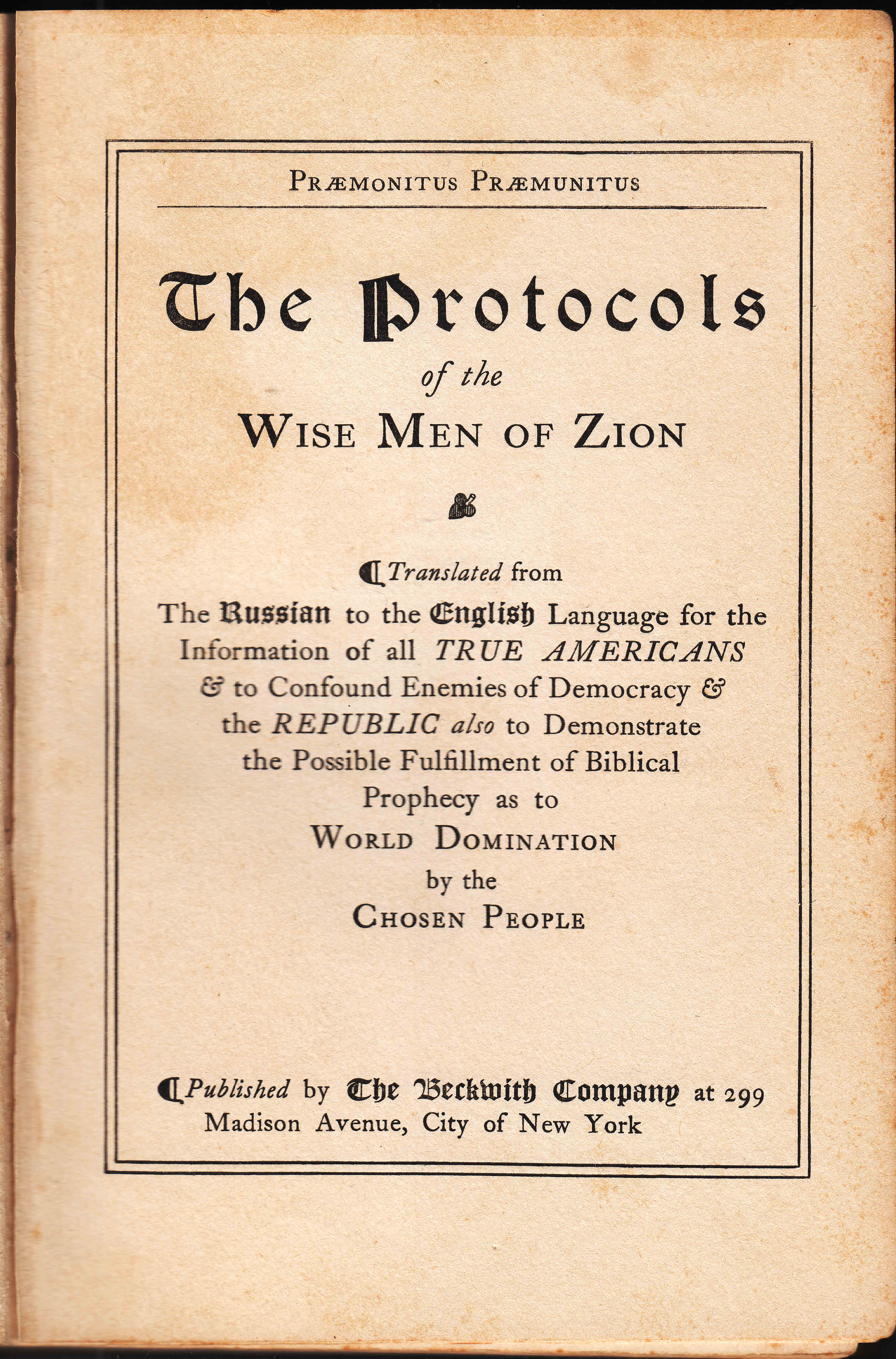
Praemonitus Praemunitus, New York: The Beckwith Company, 1920; Title page

== Biography ==
Harris was the son of Oscar Allen Houghton (May 15, 1841 – September 22, 1908) and Oscar's first wife Susan Harris Ayres (July 7, 1843 – December 9, 1900). Oscar was a minister who belonged to the Central New York Conference of the Methodist Episcopal Church. In 1901, Harris graduated from the Syracuse University School of Medicine. He thereafter pursued advanced study in Berlin. On Oct. 26, 1902, Harris married Virginia Boyd Dudley (Dec. 8, 1876 - April 8, 1946) of Bramwell, Mercer County, West Virginia. In 1911 he received his commission as first lieutenant in the Medical Reserve Corps, achieving the position of Post Surgeon at Fort Totten, New York, and a few months later was appointed Post Intelligence Office at this installation. And in December 1917 he was transferred and assigned to his position on Governor's Island.

On or about February 1, 1918, his personal assistant, Miss Natalie de Bogory, brought him an exceedingly rare book, a 1917 edition of Serge Nilus's book on the anti-Christ which incorporated into itself as an ending chapter the notorious plagiarism, literary forgery, and hoax subsequently known as the Protocols of the Elders of Zion. This rare edition had allegedly been brought to the United States by an unidentified Russian army officer who obtained it in Petrograd, Russia.

At the time of obtaining the text from Miss de Bogory, Houghton was a military intelligence officer of the United States Department of War attached to the Eastern Department offices located on Governor's Island in the City of New York.

Noted bibliographer of Judaica, Robert Singerman, describes Houghton as a "zealous counter-subversive, obsessed by the [alleged] Jewish threat to America's war effort ..." Singerman further informs us that this obsessiveness led Houghton to engage Miss de Bogory, as his personal assistant, for 9 months, and he paid for her time and work out of his own personal funds. Essentially, he retained her, and another former Russian military officer, former General G. J. Sosnowsky, to translate the Protocols of Zion into English. The translation, entitled "Praemonitus Praemunitus", was published in 1920 by the New York-based Beckwith Company; the anonymous editor, disguised under the pseudonym "Peter Beckwith," was Houghton himself.

== See also ==
- Boris Brasol
- Natalie de Bogory
