= Which Way Western Man? =

1978 book by William Gayley Simpson

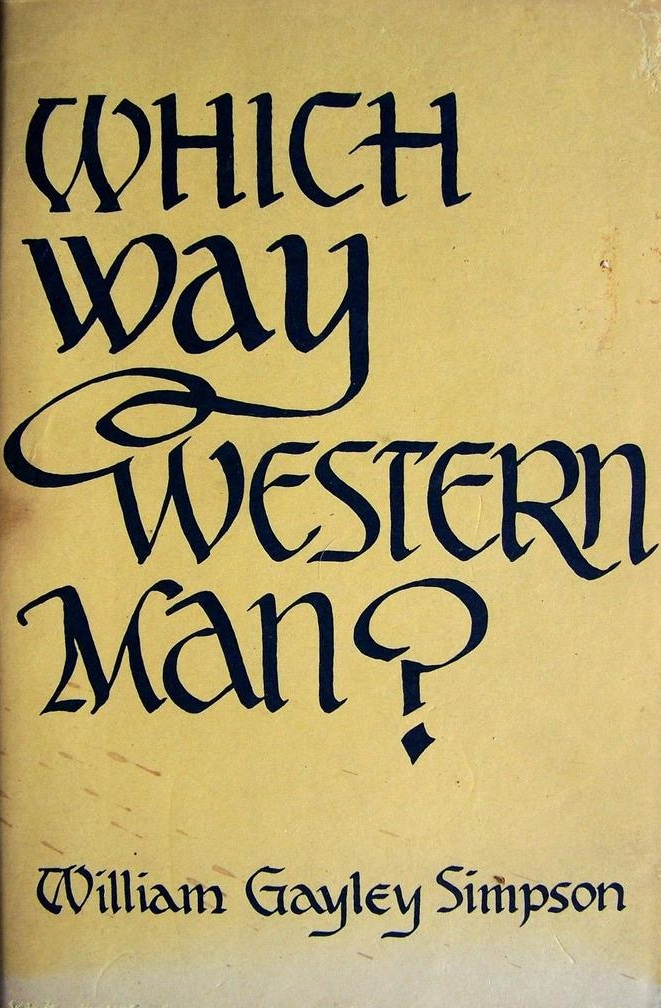
- Cover of the first edition
- Author: William Gayley Simpson
- Language: English
- Subject: White supremacy
- Published: Yeoman Press (1978); National Alliance (1980); Noontide Press (1986); National Vanguard Books (2003)
- Publication place: United States
- Media type: Print (hardcover)
- Pages: 758
- ISBN: 0-937944-01-7 1980 edition
- OCLC: 6224140
- Dewey Decimal: 909.09821082
- LC Class: CB245 .S54
- Preceded by: Toward The Rising Sun

Which Way Western Man? is a White supremacist book by William Gayley Simpson. Simpson, a former left-wing Christian activist turned White supremacist, claims that there is an organized conspiracy by "World Jewry" against the "Western Man", which is leading to the destruction of Western civilization. The book is antisemitic and anti-Black, with Simpson describing himself as a racist with pride; Simpson advocates deporting all Black people and Jews, but he additionally blames a supposed internal weakness of the Western world for this "plight". The book, in addition to its usage of antisemitic conspiracy theories, is anti-Christian in orientation, claiming Christianity, communism, capitalism, and democracy are all Jewish plots. Simpson quotes a variety of texts, including established conspiratorial works like The Protocols of the Elders of Zion.

The book was first self-published by Simpson in 1978 under the imprint Yeoman Press. Later editions were published by the neo-Nazi group the National Alliance and by the antisemitic publisher Noontide Press; the book was also promoted by the National Alliance in their catalogue. Following Simpson's death, the National Alliance's National Vanguard Books published a second, revised edition in 2003, with additional content, in accordance with his wishes.

The book sold poorly, probably in large part due to its immense length; it is over 700 pages long in its original printing, and over 1,000 in the revised edition. Despite this, it has influenced many of the most prominent White supremacist and neo-Nazi leaders, including John Tyndall, William Luther Pierce, Ben Klassen, and David Duke. The book was credited by neo-Nazi leader Robert Jay Mathews, the leader of the neo-Nazi terror group The Order, as one of his key influences. The name of the book has also been used as an Internet meme related to making choices between traditionalism and modernity.

== Background ==
William Gayley Simpson was an American White supremacist. He had previously been a left-wing labor activist and Christian, known for his Franciscanism. He then abandoned this and shifted towards a Nietzschean ideology, rejecting the universalism and egalitarianism of Christianity and many of its tenets as incompatible with the West. He later became a White supremacist.

Based on his racist and his Nietzschean ideas, he began to write Which Way Western Man? in the 1970s. Simpson also became a member of William Luther Pierce's neo-Nazi organization the National Alliance.

== Publication history ==
Which Way Western Man? was first published by Yeoman Press (a self-publishing outlet for Simpson) in Cooperstown, New York. The first edition is 758 pages long. William Luther Pierce read it and was impressed, and the book's first print run was soon after distributed by the National Alliance (NA). It was reissued by the NA in Washington, D.C., in 1980 with identical pagination. Willis Carto's antisemitic publisher Noontide Press issued a separate edition in 1986.

Pierce advertised the book in the National Alliance's catalogue, listing it alongside The Might of the West and Mein Kampf as books "every responsible, racially conscious White person must read". The book was reissued again by the NA in 1989. The book was one of only four that were directly sponsored by Pierce, alongside Pierce's own two novels and a science fiction novel, Serpent's Walk.

Following Simpson's death, a second, revised edition was published by National Vanguard Books, the publishing house of the National Alliance, in Hillsboro, West Virginia, in 2003. This edition is 1,070 pages long and contains additional material. According to Pierce, this was done to fulfill a promise he had made to Simpson before he died that he would reprint the book with an extensive list of changes. The edition's copyright page notes that "the publication of this revised edition of Which Way Western Man? fulfills a promise that William Pierce made to William Gayley Simpson, shortly before Simpson’s death in 1991. This edition includes all of Mr. Simpson’s final updates, additions and corrections."

== Contents ==
A quote in the dedication in the original edition (not included in the revised edition) is from the fascist writer Francis Parker Yockey, who writes that the spirit of heroism is superior to material forces and the worst enemy is inner decadence. In a foreword, Simpson addresses his own ideological history evolution and history as a Christian activist to his ideology then, acknowledging that this is quite different from where he started.

Simpson argues that the current West is declining and socially decaying, which it will continue to do unless something is done. The culprit for most of the problems with the current West, Simpson alleges, are Jews, whom he considers "Enemy No. 1". Jews, Simpson claims, think the "Earth was made for them to rule, and gentiles to be their servants and slaves, their milk cows". He writes that a "hard core within world Jewry", namely the Rothschilds, collaborating with the Rockefellers, who, he claims, are also secretly Jewish, decided to take control of first Europe, and then the world. Black people are portrayed as a tool used by the Jews to destroy White civilization.

Christianity, he writes, was fabricated by the Jews, as were democracy, communism and capitalism. In the book, Simpson criticizes Christianity as fundamentally at odds with "Western man", leading to the destruction and the spiritual ruin of civilization. Simpson refers to Christianity as "an alien, Oriental, Jewish infection". He criticizes Christianity for placing too much emphasis on the weak and sick rather than the noble and strong, which he argues has weakened Western civilization. In place of Christianity, he promotes an "evolutionary" approach to spirituality, and calls for a new, European religion. Despite his antipathy towards Christianity, he at times speaks positively of Jesus, but rather as a mystic figure.

He advocates a biological belief in race, describing himself with pride as a racist in the book, writing that: "Race consciousness, and discrimination on the basis of race, are absolutely essential to any race's survival, and to any nation's survival. [...] Unless we recover our race consciousness, and maintain it, and heighten it, and live by it, we shall die." He claims that White Christians are in danger of being destroyed as the result of a Jewish plot to promote racial integration, feminism, and multiculturalism. Simpson claimed that birth control and abortion are "the knife by which civilized White man is cutting his own throat", and condemns technology and miscegenation. The book also promotes eugenics. He argues for introducing polygamy and entirely eliminating women's rights, reducing them purely to the status of "breeders" to solve the question of birthrates.

The book states that Adolf Hitler was right and advocates violence against Jewish people. Simpson compares the situation in the contemporary United States to the situation in Germany during Adolf Hitler's rise to power; he claims to disavow totalitarianism, but advocates for "some Hitler" to get the West out of its current situation, which he argues will advance the West towards his ideal society. His ideal society is a society of the aristocratic, of supermen in a Nietzschean sense. Simpson's proposed "solution to the Jewish problem" is to remove all citizenship of Jews, deport all Jews, and forever ban permanent Jewish habitation in Western nations. If they fail to leave, he advocates acquiring Madagascar as a Jewish settlement. He argues that there is no place for Black people in American society and so anyone who is Black or has Black ancestry must be deported to Africa. He argues violence is acceptable to achieve these ends. Simpson claims that the choice is between societal destruction and this ethnic cleansing, concluding the book with the question: "Which way then goest thou, Western man?"

The book contains extensive footnotes and various citations to popular, scholarly, and pseudo-scholarly works. He quotes established conspiratorial texts like The Protocols of the Elders of Zion and The International Jew.

== Analysis ==
The book is Spenglerian in orientation, based heavily on the ideas promoted by Oswald Spengler in his The Decline of the West. Robert Singerman listed the book in his 1982 book Antisemitic Propaganda: An Annotated Bibliography and Research Guide. Singerman wrote that it was "a mammoth glorification of Nordic, Christian civilization by a white supremacist follower of Nietzsche" and described at as "reviving Hitler's program". The extremism scholar George Michael wrote of it as a "750-page turgid tome", while journalists Kevin Flynn and Gary Gerhardt said it "laid out in laborious and monotonous detail his reasons for believing that white Christian people were in mortal danger of losing their race by being persuaded or forced into integration with other races, the result of an organized plot by Jews, who, he declared, most jealously guarded their own racial purity."

Paul J. Devendittis wrote that it "marshals an abundance of scholarly, pseudo-scholarly and popular sources to trace the history of Western (White, Nordic) man from the beginning of time to 'our present calamities.' He concludes that the present crisis of the Nordic White Man lies with 1) the Negro, 2) the Jew and 3) Ourselves." He noted that despite quoting Yockey, a fascist who did not believe in race being biological, Simpson clearly did, thinking that "Breed is everything; and Race is the key to History"; in its depiction of Jesus, he further compared it to Yockey's writings, saying the book had "come full cycle" back to him.

In 2023, journalist Mike Rothschild described it is as extremely lengthy, at times "endless", and deeply antisemitic, anti-intellectual, and anti-communist. He critically described it as "[plodding]" through endless paragraphs of monotonous babble [...] before getting down to who's really to blame for "western man's" peril. You can probably guess." He noted that "all of it is wrapped in a cloak of mystical, high-sounding nonsense that would make the book at home on the shelf of a New Age guru with a slight fascist lean." Vegas Tenold described it as a "monotonous tome" and a "diatribe against the ills that have fallen on the white race".

== Impact and legacy ==
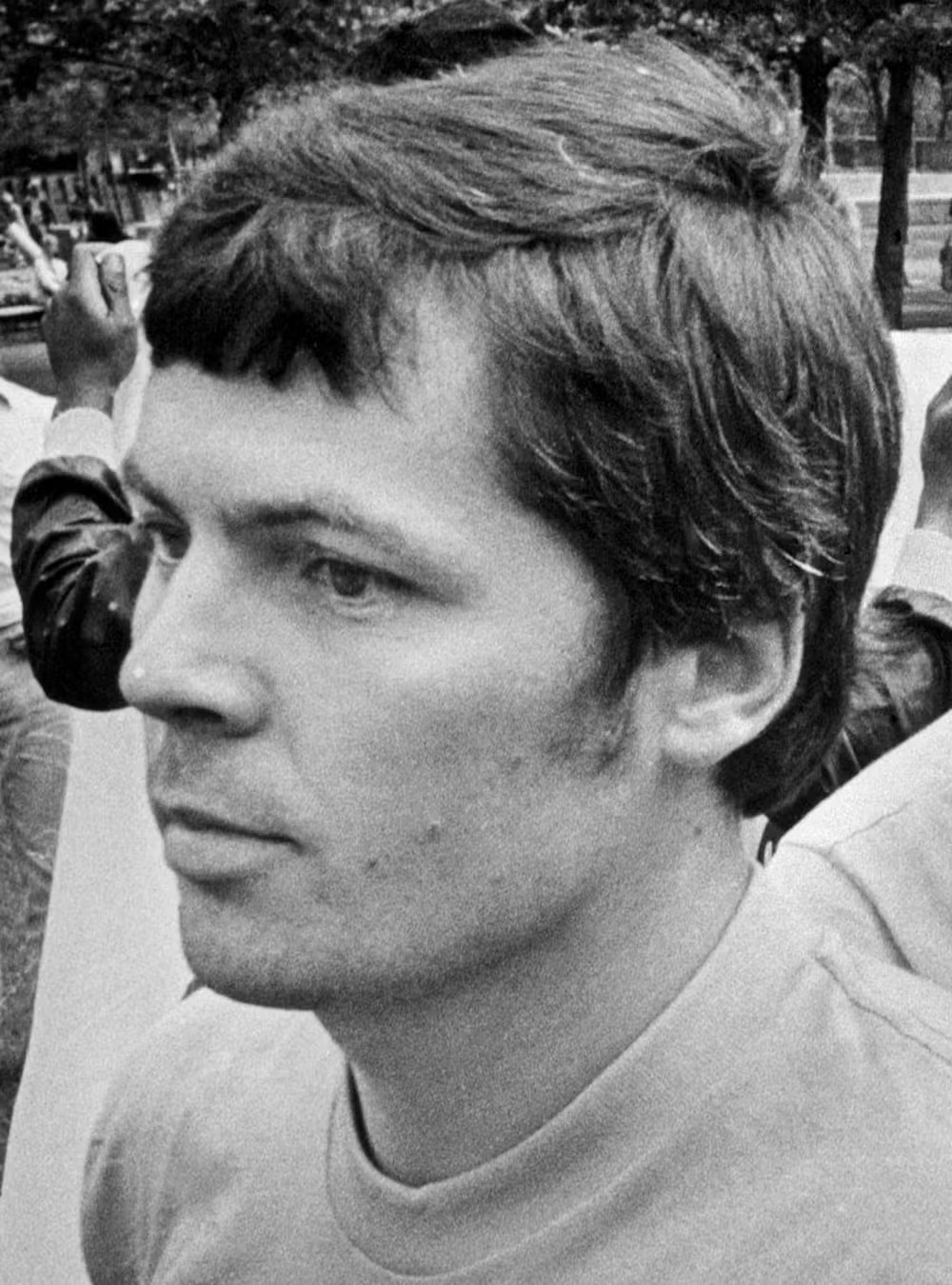
Robert Jay Mathews, the leader of the neo-Nazi group The Order, was one of many white supremacists to be influenced by the book.

The book did not sell well, probably in large part due to its immense length. Despite this, it has been greatly influential on many notable neo-Nazi and White supremacist figures and groups; in 1992, scholar Paul J. Devendittis wrote that it "ranks as one of the most frequently quoted and referenced works in the racial nationalist library".

The book was an influence on the ideology of William Luther Pierce, the founder of the National Alliance who later republished the book. The book also influenced Ben Klassen, the founder of the Church of the Creator, neo-Nazi Harold Covington, Frazier Glenn Miller Jr., a Ku Klux Klan leader and later murderer, and British far-right politician John Tyndall. Far-right British politician Nick Griffin has quoted the work, and David Duke credited it as a book that shaped his ideology.

Which Way Western Man? was a substantial influence on Robert Jay Mathews, the founder of the neo-Nazi terrorist group The Order. He credited the book as a key resource. In a letter he wrote the day before he died in a shootout with federal officers, he said he was "especially taken" with the book, and credited it as a work that contributed to his "self-education" as a racist. He had highlighted in red many passages in the copy of the book that he owned.

Far-right writer Revilo P. Oliver reviewed it in a 1980 issue of the neo-Nazi Liberty Bell magazine, and also in Pierce's Attack! where he echoed Simpson's criticisms of Christianity as a religion of weakness; this review resulted in a meeting between Pierce and Oliver after Pierce cut Oliver's review down for being too long and containing too many attacks against Christianity unrelated to the book. Tyndall also reviewed it in the late 1970s in his magazine Spearhead. While he generally praised Simpson and saw the book as an update on Nietzsche for "our current Western predicament", he criticized Simpson's proposal for entirely eliminating women's rights and introducing polygamy, arguing that this would be itself anti-Western. He critiqued Simpson's proposal here as something that would "enrage all but the most extreme male chauvinists" and as too similar to what he saw as the Islamic society. Spearhead also printed extracts from the book at times.

=== As an Internet meme ===
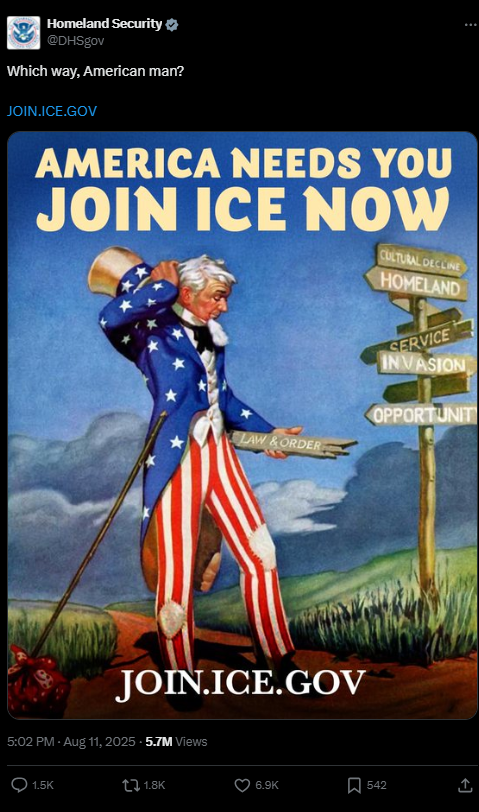
The 2025 tweet in question

The title of the book has been used as an Internet meme by the far right. The format of the meme is typically this: an individual faces two paths, usually between something more traditional positioned as good, and one modern, positioned as bad, and captioned with the title of the book, "which way, Western man?". It is used by the far right and racialists who agree with Simpson, but many usages are by those are unaware of the title's origins, or ironic in nature.

In 2025, the official Twitter account for the United States Department of Homeland Security posted an image as part of a campaign to recruit people to join Immigration and Customs Enforcement. The image features Uncle Sam in front of signs pointing several different ways with various labels, and captioned "Which Way, American Man?", an apparent reference to Simpson's book. This attracted public controversy and criticism from several outlets. Department of Homeland Security assistant secretary for public affairs, Tricia McLaughlin, denied the post was a reference to Simpson's book.

In 2026, in the context of American pursuits of annexing Greenland, the White House posted a meme on Twitter with the question: "Which way, Greenland man?", which Heidi Beirich of the Global Project Against Hate and Extremism described as a reference to the book.
