= Georgy Butmi de Katzman =

Russian journalist (1856–1919)

- Георгий Васильевич Бутми-де-Кацман
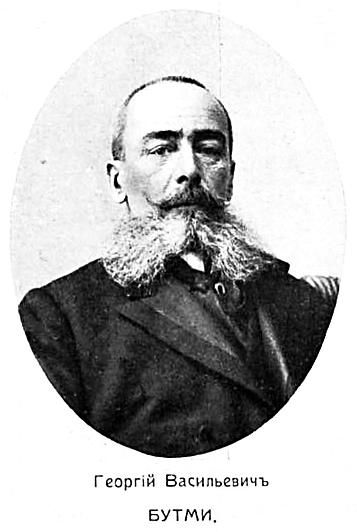
- Born: Georgy Vasilievich Butmi de Katzman; 1856; Bessarabia Governorate, Russian Empire
- Died: 1919 (aged 62–63)
- Occupations: Journalist, writer, economist

Georgy Vasilievich Butmi de Katzman (Russian: Георгий Васильевич Бутми-де-Кацман; 1856–1919) was a Russian antisemitic journalist, writer and economist (author of books and papers on economy), member of the far-right Union of the Russian People.

Butmi opposed introduction of gold standard and supported bimetallism in his writings.

Butmi edited and published the Russian language editions of the antisemitic tract The Protocols of the Elders of Zion, in 1906, and 1907, respectively, after the Pavel Krushevan 1903 and Sergei Nilus 1905 editions. The first edition was published by Krushevan in Znamya in 1903; it has come to be known as the "shorter version." The second version was published by Nilus as chapter twelve in the 1905 second edition of his book, Velikoe v malom, on the coming of the anti-Christ. Butmi's, therefore, is essentially the third major edition in any language.
