= Small, Maynard & Company =

Book publisher in Boston, USA

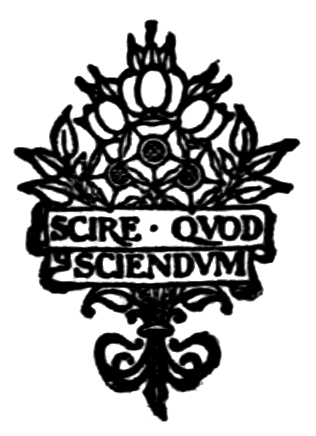
- The company logo
- Status: Defunct
- Founded: 1897
- Founder: Herbert Small
- Defunct: 1927
- Country of origin: United States
- Headquarters location: Boston
- Key people: Norman H. White
- Publication types: Books

Small, Maynard & Company (Small, Maynard and Company in bibliographies) is a defunct publishing house located in Boston. In its day it was a highly reputable house in literature, and several U.S. authors were published by it, including Walt Whitman.

The company opened its doors in 1897 at 6 Beacon St. in Boston. New editions of Whitman's Leaves of Grass and an edition of his complete works among the first to be published, after acquiring the rights to these works from the poet's executors.

The company motto, which it published decoratively and in Latin, on title pages of its books was Scire quod sciendum, and translates as Knowledge worth knowing.

In 1899, Small, Maynard & Co. took over the Copeland & Day publishing house. A year later, founder Herbert Small retired due to ill health.

The business was sold at auction to Norman H. White, of Brookline, Massachusetts, owner of the Boston Bookbinding Company. White left the firm in 1907, but later returned.

In the summer of 1907, the company acquired the Herbert B. Turner & Co. publishing company, which was less than five years old and had specialized in publishing classics such as a new, 13-volume edition of Robert Louis Stevenson's works, as well as theological works by laymen.

Around 1907, the firm specialized in Belles-lettres and biographies.

== Protocols of Zion ==
The house is also known for publishing the first American English language US edition of the Protocols of the Elders of Zion. The work carries no editor, translator or name of a compiler; however, it includes an alleged facsimile of a title page, in the Russian language, with a translation on the other side. The translation indicates that the author was Sergei Nilus and the place (apparently of publication) is given as "THE TOWN OF SERGIEV." This town appears to be Sergiev Posad.

The book opens, after the facsimile title page, with "Part One, Introductory Statement," and on page 5 of this introduction is the following accounting as to the original source for the translation:

Now, for the first time, the document entitled by Mr. Nilus "Protocols of the Meetings of the Zionist Men of Wisdom" is published in the United States, correctly translated from the Russian text as it appears in Mr. Nilus's book, "It is Near, At the Door," 1917, published in the printing office of the Sviato-Troitzky Monastery.

Cesare G. De Michelis not only indicates that this imprint is the first US English language editions of "The Protocols," but gives the name of the editor as Boris Brasol, an antisemite whom Robert Singerman called "public enemy" of the Jews.

- The Protocols and World Revolution

anonymous (Boris Brasol)
(Boston: Small, Maynard & Company, 1920)
Library of Congress Online Catalog:

== Bankruptcy ==
Owing $1,475,569 to creditors, the company filed for bankruptcy on March 1, 1927. Norman White, who was then the company's president, later pleaded not guilty to eight indictments in twenty-five counts, charging larceny through false pretenses of $474,500 from eight Boston banks.

White was later sentenced to 3–5 years in prison for theft of over $369,000 from local banks.

== See also ==
- Robert Singerman
