= William Gayley Simpson =

American neo-Nazi writer (1892–1991)

- Photo of Simpson used as the cover of a 2003 printing of Which Way Western Man?
- Born: July 23, 1892; Elizabeth, New Jersey, U.S.
- Died: December 31, 1990 (aged 98); Cooperstown, New York, U.S.
- Education: Lafayette College (BA); Union Theological Seminary (BD)
- Organization(s): National Civil Liberties Bureau, National Alliance
- Notable work: Toward The Rising Sun (1935); Which Way Western Man? (1978)
- Spouse: Harriet Whitcher (m. 1965)
- Children: 1

William Gayley Simpson (July 23, 1892 – December 31, 1990) was an American white supremacist author, Presbyterian clergyman and lecture-circuit speaker. From the late 1910s to the 1920s, Simpson was a Christian left-wing labor activist and the associate director for the National Civil Liberties Bureau, the precursor to the American Civil Liberties Union.

He went on to live an ascetic Christian life, which gained him some amount of notoriety with American Christians, before traveling to India and Japan. In the late 1920s, Simpson became disillusioned with Christianity and his former politics and began lecturing criticizing Christianity and promoting Nietzschean ideas. He authored a book on these ideas, Toward The Rising Sun, in 1935.

Simpson later became a White supremacist and a member of the neo-Nazi group the National Alliance, led by William Luther Pierce. Simpson is most well-known for his 1978 book Which Way Western Man?, which claims there is a Jewish plot against White people, calls for violence against Jews, and says that Adolf Hitler was right. Simpson's ideology and works, particularly Which Way Western Man? has had an influence on several White supremacist and neo-Nazi figures.

== Early life and education ==
Simpson was born on July 23, 1892, in Elizabeth, New Jersey. He was the son of Maxwell Gayley Simpson, a physician. His family was established and well respected in the area. He had a sister, Mary, and a younger brother, Maxwell Stewart Simpson. Simpson was raised and completed his early education in Elizabeth, where he attended Battin High School. There he graduated at the age of 15 with honors.

He attended Lafayette College and graduated in 1912 with a Bachelor of Arts degree, with Phi Beta Kappa standing and as valedictorian. He attended the Union Theological Seminary, graduating in 1915 with a Bachelor of Divinity, magna cum laude. He later moved to North Dakota, and afterwards became a student assistant there.

== Career ==
=== Christianity ===
Simpson became a pastor of the First Presbyterian Church in Perth Amboy, New Jersey, on September 16, 1915. He was ordained as a pastor there in February 1917, at the age of 24. He was formally installed in June of that year. He was given a choice between service in a poor and run-down district in Perth Amboy or a wealthy one, and chose the former. He advocated a pacifist stance during World War I, which caused conflict with his congregation and led to his resignation.

He then left the clergy and devoted himself to private study, for a time working at the private faculty of Brookwood Labor College. At this time, he was a racial integrationist and labor advocate, possibly a socialist. From 1918 to 1919 he was the associate director of the National Civil Liberties Bureau, now the American Civil Liberties Union.

He became known as a mystic, and for living a life in "startling contrast" to then-modern conventions. In the 1920s, Simpson began living ascetically in a Franciscan manner, throwing away all of his belongings, subsisting off of donated provisions, and living in a shack he built for a period of 7 or 8 years. This acquired him some notoriety among American Christians; a commentator later called him "America’s greatest exponent of Franciscanism". Church officials believed him a menace. He lived doing odd jobs including carpentry.

In 1925, Simpson was found in a "mentally unbalanced" state near a train station in Washington, New Jersey, with a self written tract in his pocket. His concerning mental state was attributed to overwork. He then traveled to several countries seeking spiritual wisdom, including India and Japan.

=== Abandonment and denunciation of Christianity ===
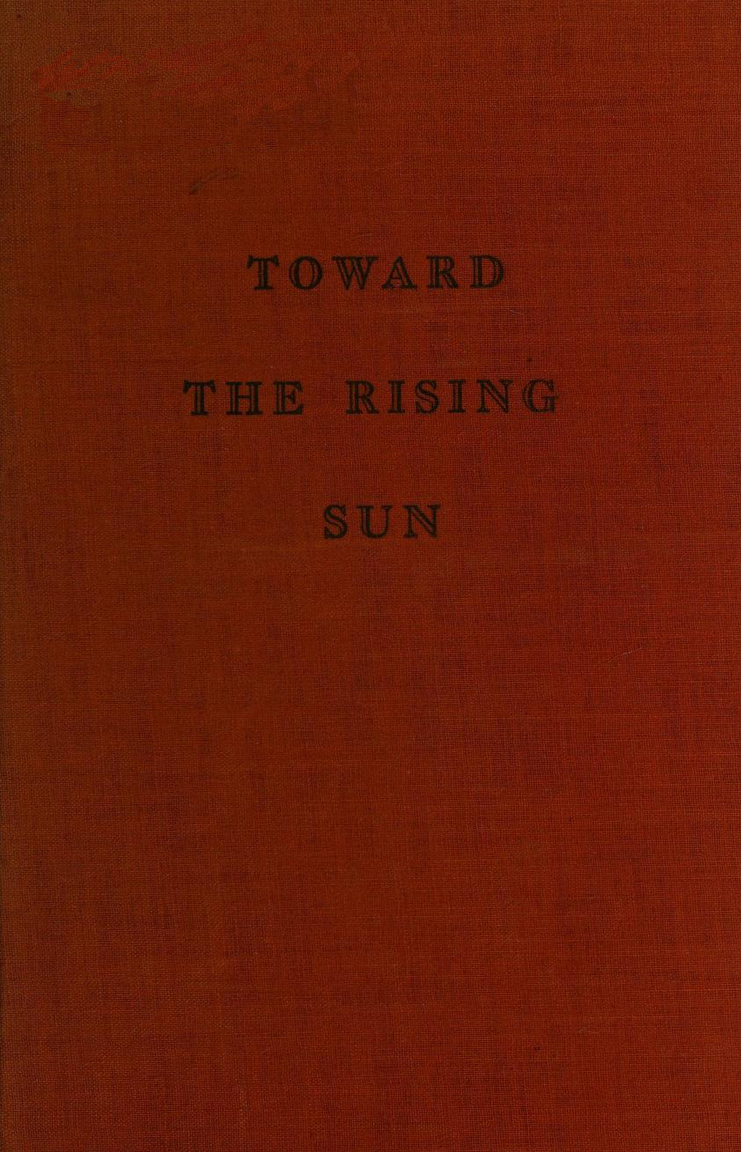
The cover of his 1935 book, Toward The Rising Sun

In the late 1920s, Simpson became disillusioned with his former ideas and the current Christian institutions. After reading the works of Friedrich Nietzsche, he rejected Christianity and came to disdain egalitarianism and Christian ideas of universalism. Upon his return to the United States, he settled on a farm in Prattsville, New York. He had a son in 1929, though he had previously been against having a family.

Following two and a half years of public silence, where he lived on his farm, he returned to public speaking in 1935. He spoke at conferences at churches and colleges in the Buffalo, New York, area as well as in Vermont and Maine. One speech he gave was entitled "The Meaning of Life". In one such conference in 1934, he publicly criticized what he called Christianity's "herd morality"; in another conference, he criticized it by stating that it was detrimental to man, alongside democracy. He wrote that man must disdain such a society, and "must strive to be strong enough to live according to the best that he finds within him, and do so fearlessly, even though society tempts him to join it and become little more than a 'well fed cow".

In 1935, Simpson authored Toward The Rising Sun, published by Vanguard Press. The book opens with a biographical introduction by Jerome Davis of the Yale Divinity School, which describes Simpson's background and life. The book outlines Simpson's philosophy and religious beliefs, influenced by Nietzsche.

Simpson advocated a life of personal revelation, of finding one's own right path. He argued that the most important thing any human can do is to be true to one's self and to be strong, which he said is challenged by anything that limits one's personal freedom, including Christian morality and family life, and so all else should be sacrificed. He wrote that man should not expend effort "merely trying to salvage human wreckage, on all sorts of life that can never come to anything, and not even on salvaging it, but only on preserving it, on merely keeping alive by artificial means that which ought to die, and which, if left to nature, would die".

A 1935 review in The New York Times described it as "a rather notable piece of writing". The Christian magazines The Christian Century and The Christian Leader also reviewed the book. The Christian Century's reviewer W. E. Garrison said of the book that "It is a long time since I have read a book which contains so much with which I heartily disagree but which I can cordially recommend for reading by thoughtful persons"; he criticized Simpson's life philosophy as "empty of content" in that it did not give any recommendation for what the nature of his values were, and his message on how to find their objective in life was obfuscated.

Philip F. Mayer for The Christian Leader wrote that his arguments, though anti-Christian, were "given with masterful clarity and force". He said that though Simpson was then "not at all sympathetic to Hitlerism, there is a parallel between the two points of view", and that the book was a good read if one wished to understand the language of future critics of Christianity, who may be more severe. The New York Times wrote of the book that:

Simpson sets forth in more detail the convictions that have possessed him, or, rather, that possess him now, with a backward glance now and then at those in which he formerly believed. In each of the stages by which he has come to his present convictions he seems to have been as sure as he is now that he had found the ultimate truth, only to have doubts creep in, and presently destroy the entire structure, so that he found himself once more searching for truth and, sooner or later, once more finding it [...] one wonders how it is possible for him still to believe so absolutely in his vision when it has played him false so many times, why he still thinks he can know the truth when so many times he has had to decide that what he had thought to be truth proved to be something else.

An article in the magazine Unity by a former associate noted his abrupt political change, with the author remarking: "Rejoice, shades of Nietzsche! [...] Bill is joining the revolt against democracy. A little more and a Communist would call him a dyed-in-the-wool Fascist". At a conference which was held in 1938, Simpson declared that the modern West was "one of the most contemptible civilizations that has ever existed", denouncing feminism, "poor breeding", and industrialization, stating that these changes were evidence that man was entering a dark age. He lectured in 1941 in Massachusetts on "Aristocratic Radicalism".

=== White supremacy ===
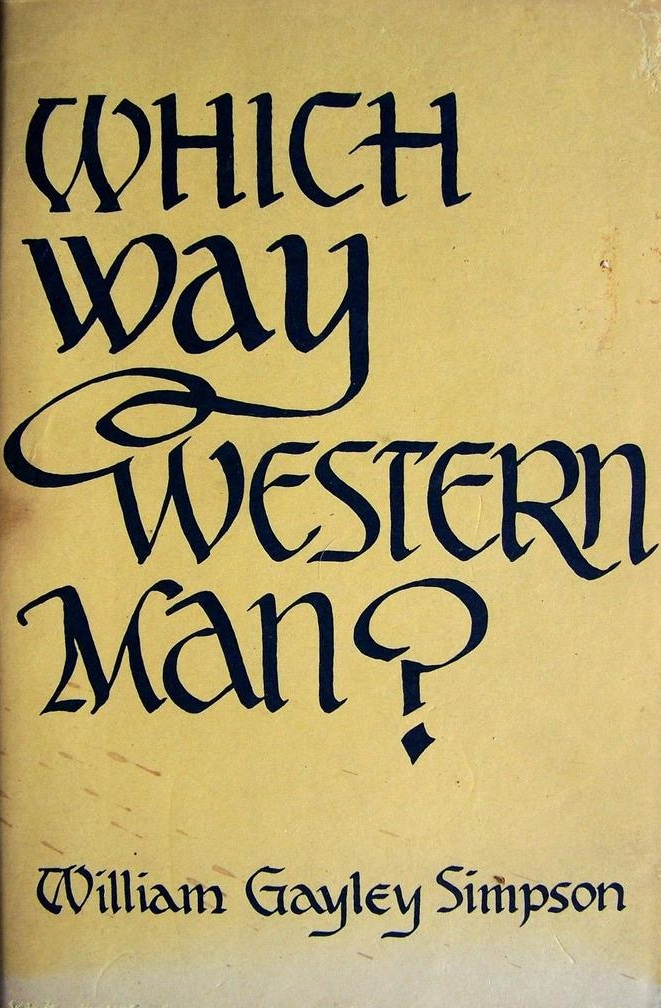
The first edition cover of Which Way Western Man? published in 1978 by Yeoman Press

For the next few decades Simpson was largely a reclusive figure, and he later became an influential White supremacist. In June 1965, he was engaged to Harriet Storrs Nichols Whitcher. They married June 30, 1965. Based on his racist and his Nietzschean ideas, he wrote the book Which Way Western Man? published by Yeoman Press in 1978. Simpson also became a member of William Luther Pierce's neo-Nazi organization the National Alliance.

The book, which recounts Simpson's ideological history, also states that White Christians are in danger of being destroyed as the result of a Jewish plot to promote racial integration, feminism, and multiculturalism. Simpson claimed that birth control and abortion are "the knife by which civilized White man is cutting his own throat". The book states that Adolf Hitler was right and advocates violence against Jewish people (whom he considered "Enemy No. 1"), including denial of their citizenship and forcible expulsion.

In the book, Simpson criticized Christianity by stating that it was fundamentally at odds with "Western man", leading to the destruction and the spiritual ruin of civilization. In place of Christianity, he promoted an evolutionary approach to spirituality. The book also criticizes democracy and promotes eugenics. Simpson described himself with pride as a racist in the book, writing that: "Race consciousness, and discrimination on the basis of race, are absolutely essential to any race's survival, and to any nation's survival. [...] Unless we recover our race consciousness, and maintain it, and heighten it, and live by it, we shall die."

== Death and legacy ==
Simpson died on December 31, 1990, in Cooperstown, New York. His ideology and works influenced several White supremacist and neo-Nazi thinkers. He was an influence on the ideology of William Luther Pierce. The 2022 book The Case for Christian Nationalism incorporates Simpson's arguments. Which Way Western Man? was a substantial influence on Robert Jay Mathews, the founder of the neo-Nazi terrorist group The Order. The book also influenced Ben Klassen, the founder of the Church of the Creator, and British far-right politician John Tyndall.

The title of the book has been used as an internet meme by the far-right, but also by some who are unaware of its origins. In 2025, the official Twitter account for the United States Department of Homeland Security posted an image as part of a campaign to recruit people to join Immigration and Customs Enforcement. The image was captioned "Which Way, American Man?", an apparent reference to Simpson's book. In 2026, in the context of American pursuits of annexing Greenland, the White House posted a meme on Twitter with the question: "Which way, Greenland man?", which Heidi Beirich of the Global Project Against Hate and Extremism described as a reference to the book.

== Bibliography ==
- —— (1927). A Spiritual Quest and Venture of Faith.
- —— (1935). Toward The Rising Sun. New York: Vanguard Press.
- —— (1978). Which Way Western Man?. Cooperstown: Yeoman Press.
  - —— (2003). Which Way Western Man? (2nd ed.). Hillsboro: National Vanguard Books. ISBN 0-937944-16-5.
