= Russian Imperial Union-Order =

Russian monarchist organization

The Russian Imperial Union Order (RIUO) (Russian: Rossiyskiy Imperskiy Soyuz Orden, Российский Имперский Союз-Орден, РИС-О) is a traditional Russian monarchist organization. The order is the most influential and respected body of the organisations supporting interest in the Russian monarchy and the White movement.

== Founding ==
It was founded by Boris Lvovovich Brasol (1885–1963) and other White émigrés in 1929.

It was one of two organisations formed after the end of the Russian Civil War, to carry on White Russian traditions, the other being the Russian All-Military Union (Russian: Русский Обще-Воинский Союз, abbreviated РОВС, ROVS), created by White Army General Pyotr Wrangel. However, the Russian Imperial Union Order is monarchist in nature. Both organisations formed after the civil war have continued to this day.

After the departure of the White Russians from Russia, organizational units appeared in many European countries and other classic destinations for immigrants such as the United States, Canada, Australia; various countries in South and Central America; and even Hong Kong.

In the 1930s, Brazol and others, as part of the orders work, pushed for the reinstatement of the monarchy. At one time, he saw an alliance with the early Nazi Party before it came to power. However, the Nazi Party dropped its monarchist stance after it came into power, and he disasociated himself with it.

== Support for Romanovs ==
The order is part of the legitimist faction, which includes the Russian Orthodox Church, and supports the view that the monarch should be from the Romanov imperial family. That is in common with the nature of émigré organisations, which support the émigré family of Romanov descendants. Originally, the RIUO supported the claim of Grand Duke Kirill Vladimirovich of Russia as Russian tsar in exile and, after his death in 1938, the claim of his son Grand Duke Vladimir Kirillovich of Russia as head of the family.

Today, the order supports the claim of Grand Duchess Maria Vladimirovna of Russia, the granddaughter of Grand Duke Kirill Vladimirovich, as the sole legitimate heir of the Russian monarchy. The head of the Imperial Family is seen as the current tsar. The order is also formally allied with the Order of Saint John of Jerusalem, Russian Grand Priory Association, the surviving Russian priory of the Knights of Malta.

== Return to Russia ==
After the end of the Soviet Union, the organisation returned to Russia and opened up chapters there. The RIUO is member of the International Monarchist Conference.

The order has pushed overseas for support of the restoration of the Russian monarchy.

== Current operations ==
The organisation works with the Orthodox Church and even played a part in reconciling the two split Orthodox patriarchies before they have more recently become closer and less antagonistic. It organises charity events and continues to support the Royal line within and outside Russia. The order issues medals to thank people who have made a contribution to the monarchist goals in general and to the goals of the RIUO. The order also has an educational role, particularly in encouraging historical research.

It is the oldest Russian Imperial organisation that still exists.
