= Praemonitus praemunitus =

Praemonitus praemunitus or forewarned is forearmed may refer to:

- Motto of the United States Army Security Agency
- Motto of the U.S. Air Force Theater Battle Control Division at Hanscom Air Force Base, Massachusetts
- Praemonitus Praemunitus, the title of the second American edition of the Protocols of the Elders of Zion, first published in 1920
- Praemonitus Praemunitus, the motto of Investigations & Protective Services, Hollywood, Florida.
- Forewarned is Forearmed, the motto of the British Royal Observer Corps
- Praemonitus Praemunitus, the motto of the Gearing-class destroyer USS Forrest Royal
- Forewarned, Forearmed, the motto of the Australian Army Intelligence Corps.
- Forewarned, Forearmed, the motto of HMS Boxer.
