= Albert Sonnichsen =

American journalist (1878–1931)

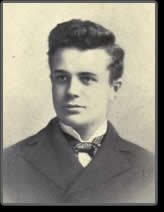
- Born: May 5, 1878; San Francisco, California
- Died: August 16, 1931 (aged 53); Willimantic, Connecticut
- Occupation(s): American journalist, author

Albert Sonnichsen (May 5, 1878 – August 16, 1931) was an American journalist, author and adventurer.

== Biography ==
Albert's father, Nicholas Sonnichsen, had fought with the Confederate Army during the American Civil War and, like his son later, was captured and held as a POW. As young boy Albert ran from home and traveled around the world. In 1898 he went to the Philippines as an American soldier during the Spanish–American War. He was captured and held in captivity for more than ten months.

In the summer 1904 he traveled to the Balkans at the invitation of the Internal Macedonian Revolutionary Organization (IMRO). He spent most of the next year in Kyustendil, a town in south-western Bulgaria close to the then Ottoman-Bulgarian border and an important staging area for the activities of the IMRO inside Ottoman Macedonia. In the late summer of 1905 he crossed into Macedonia illegally with a "cheta" (armed band) of the IMRO and interviewed Damyan Gruev, one of the Organization's founders, publishing an account of this trip in the New York Evening Post as well as Blackwood's Magazine. In the winter of 1906 Sonnichsen entered Macedonia again and spent most of the year in the field with armed bands of the Organization. According to Sonnichsen the distinction between the Bulgarians in Bulgaria and those in Ottoman Macedonia was purely political.

Sonnichsen married Natalie de Bogory (1887–1939), who is primarily known for her work in translating from the Russian language into the English language, and subsequently distributing and participating in having published the first or second American edition in the United States of the document known as the Protocols of the Elders of Zion. They had one child Eric in 1909, but were divorced in 1919.

Later Sonnichsen was an organizer of the Cooperative movement in the USA; he wrote Consumer's Coöperation outlining the movement and its aims. In 1920 he settled in Connecticut and managed his own farm. He died in 1931, aged 53.

== Bibliography ==
- Ten months a captive among Filipinos (1901)
- Deep Sea Vagabonds (1903)
- The Secret Republic of Macedonia. (1904).
- Confessions of a Macedonian Bandit. (1909).
- Consumers' Cooperation (1919)
