= List of editions of The Protocols of the Elders of Zion =

This lists early editions of The Protocols of the Elders of Zion, an antisemitic forgery purporting to describe a Jewish conspiracy to achieve world domination. For recent editions, see Contemporary imprints of The Protocols of the Elders of Zion.

== In the Russian Empire ==
1902 M: Mikhail Osipovich Menshikov (1902) - The first textual reference to the Protocols, in an article in the newspaper Novoye Vremya; claims that they were stolen by a "French journalist" in Nice, and quotes a line.

=== 1903 ===
- In Russian, in the newspaper Znamya. The headline in the newspaper was Programa zavoevanija mira evrejami (The Jewish Programme to Conquer the World). The title of The Protocols (purported) itself was The Protocols of the Sessions of the "World Alliance of Freemasons and of the Sages of Zion". The publisher was Pavel Krushevan. Publication was in nine issues of the newspaper, from No. 190 through No. 197 and No. 200, from August to September (old style) or in September (new style).

=== 1904 ===
L: Hippolytus Lutostansky - A direct quote of above edition; no revision, but useful chronological evidence.

=== 1905 ===
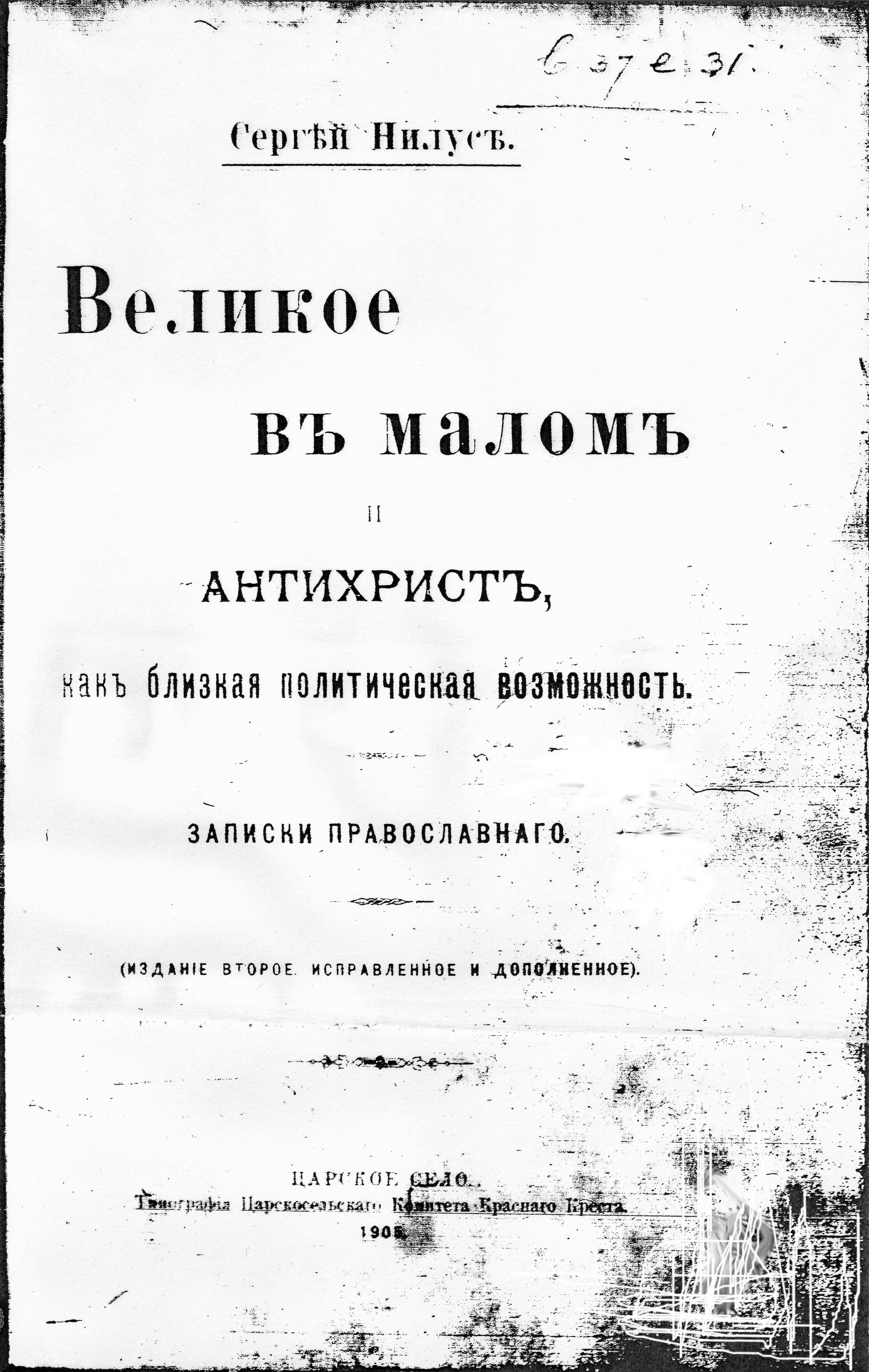
1905 ed. Velikoe v malom i antikhrist, Microform in NYPL

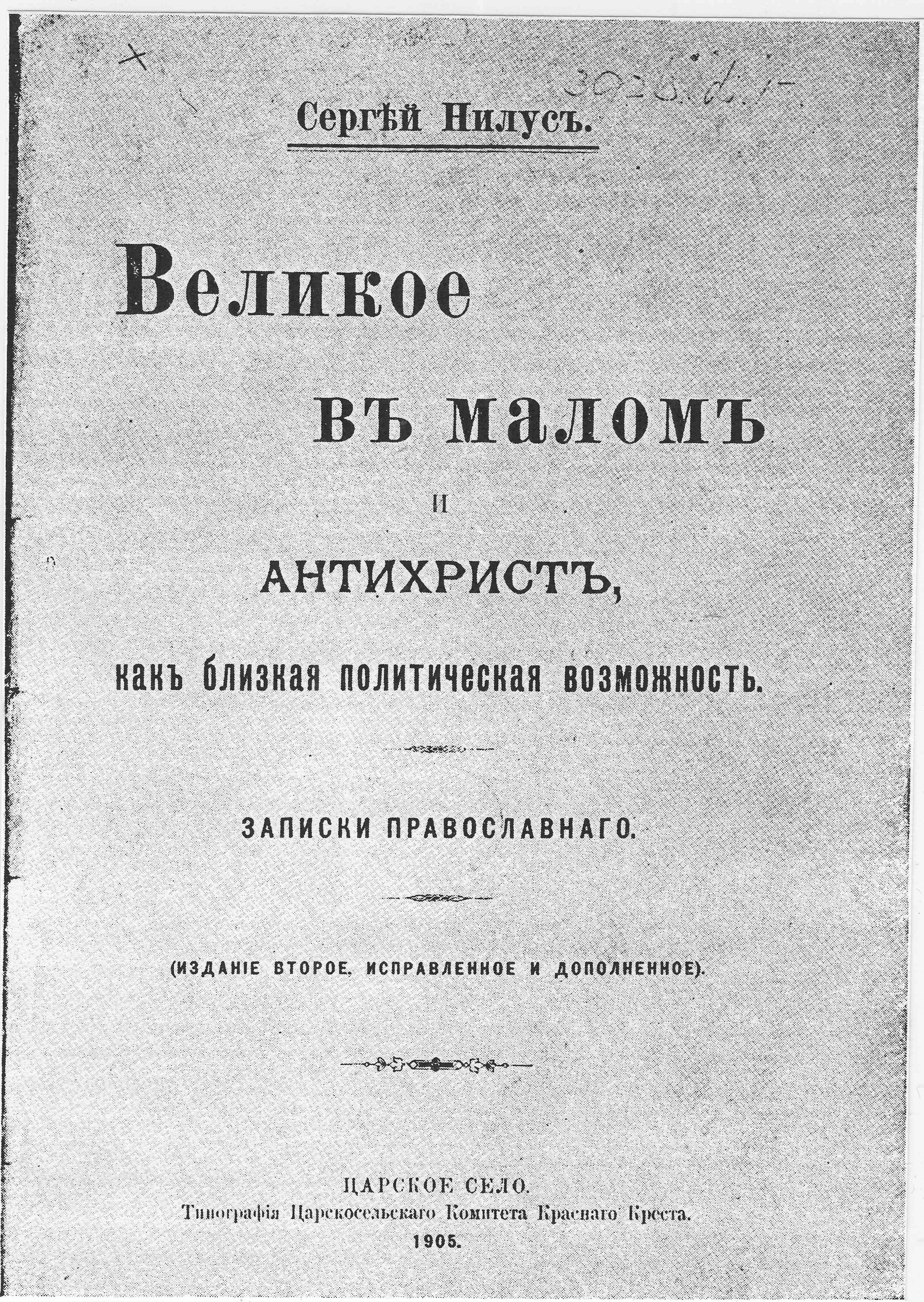
1905 ed., Facsimile of Title page in Praemonitus Praemunitus (1920) by Harris A. Houghton

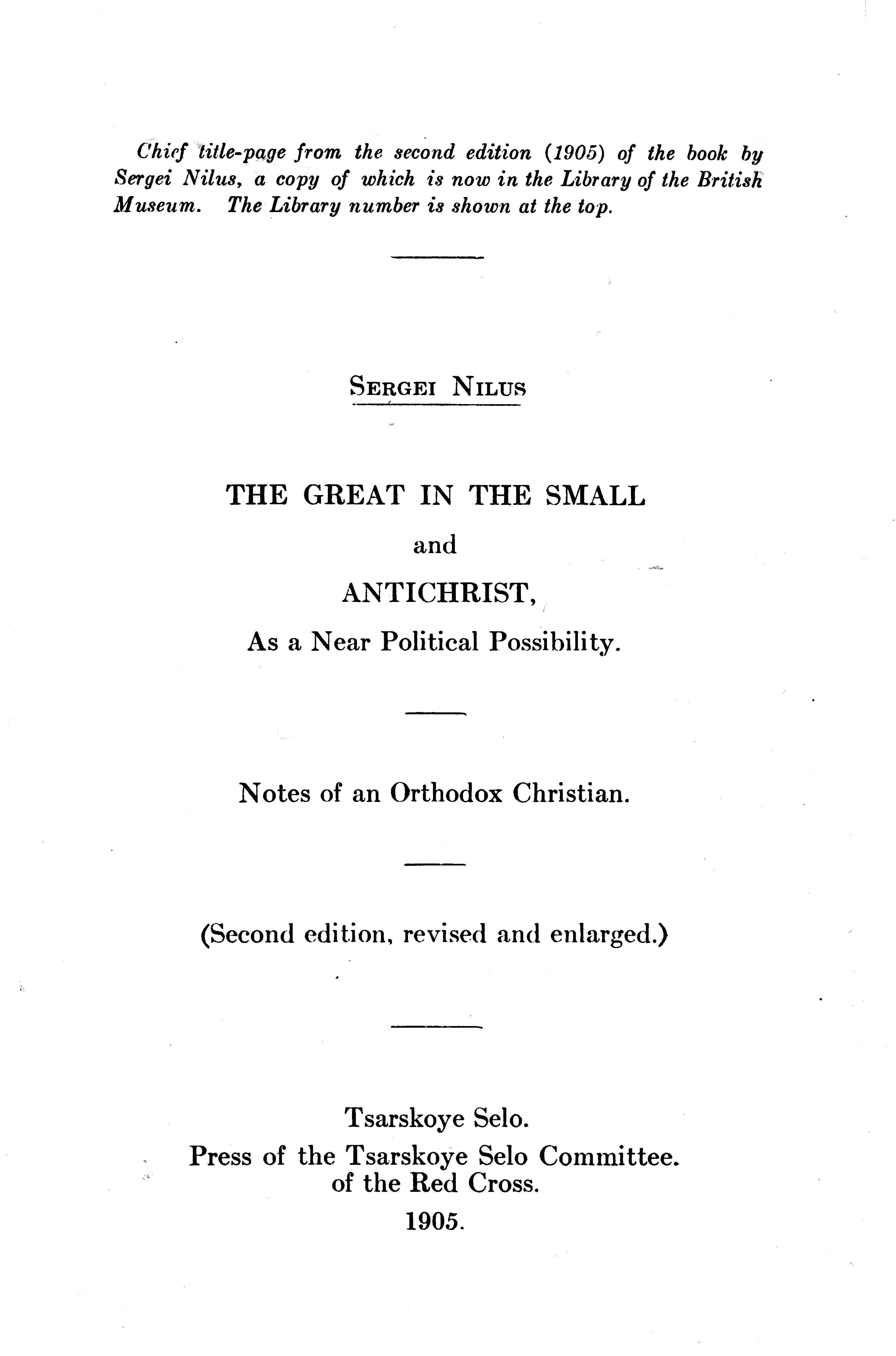
1905 ed., Translation of Title page in Praemonitus Praemunitus (1920) by Harris A. Houghton

Великое въ маломъ и антихристъ (Velikoe v' malom' i antikhrist' ), [The Great within the Minuscule and Antichrist, trans.]

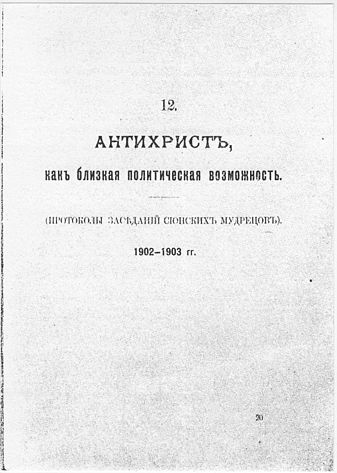
1905 Velikoe v malom, Ch. 12 Title page

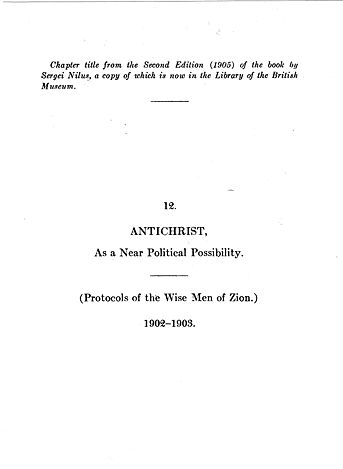
1905 Velikoe v malom, Ch. 12 Title page Translation

kak blizkaia politicheskaia vozmozhnost. Zapiski pravoslavnago.
by Sergiei Nilus, 1862–1930.
Edition 2. izd., ispr. i dop.
Imprint TSarskoe Selo, Tip. TSarskoselskago Komiteta Krasnago Kresta, 1905.
Description 417 p.

=== 1906 ===
Russian: Враги рода человѣческаго, romanized: Vragi roda cheloviecheskago
(Title translation: Enemies of the Human Race)
Related name (anonymous editor): G. Butmi.
LC Uniform Title: Protocols of the wise men of Zion
(St. Petersberg: Soiuz russkogo naroda, 1906)
p. x, 88 24 cm.
LC Classification: DS141 .B97 1906

This version claims, bizarrely, that the Protocols date to 929 B.C.

In 2020 the Russian historian Ljubov’ Vladimirovna Ul’Janova-Bibikova found a typescript version of the Protocols of the Elders of Zion in the manuscripts collections of the Moscow Central Library. The copy included manuscript additions of terms and corrections found in the 1906 version edited by Georgy Butmi. The handwriting is similar to other manuscripts written by Butmi. This typescript copy confirms that the Protocols were written at least in part in Russia, and were not completely written or translated in France. Cesare G. De Michelis has signalled the importance of the discovery of this typescript.

=== 1911 ===
- Library of Congress catalog card:

LC Control No.: 75554498
Type of Material: Book (Print, Microform, Electronic, etc.)
Personal Name: Nilus, Sergeĭ Aleksandrovich, 1862-1930. [from old catalog]
Main Title: Bliz gri͡adushchīĭ Antikhrĭst.
Published/Created: 1911.
Description: 168 p. illus. 23 cm.
Notes: Romanized.
Subjects: Antichrist. [from old catalog]
Russkaia pravoslavnaia tserkovʹ--Doctrinal and controversial works.
LC Classification: BT985 .N54

Second Nilus Russian language edition

=== 1912 ===
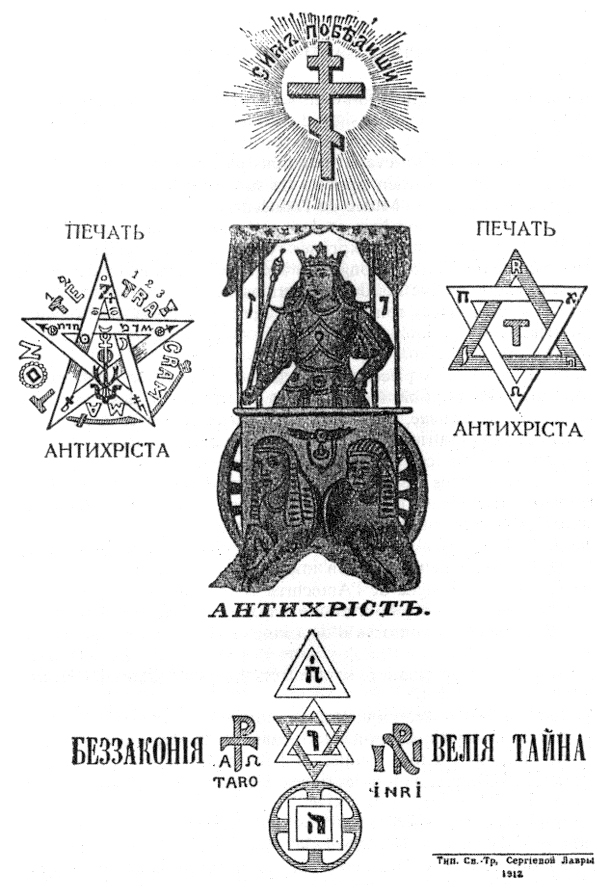
The frontispiece of an imprint of The Protocols dated 1912. Some of the signs or occult symbols read: "Thus we shall win", "Mark of "antichrist", "Tetragrammaton", "INRI", "Tarot", "Great mystery"

- 1912 3rd ed. Serge Nilus imprint

=== 1917 ===
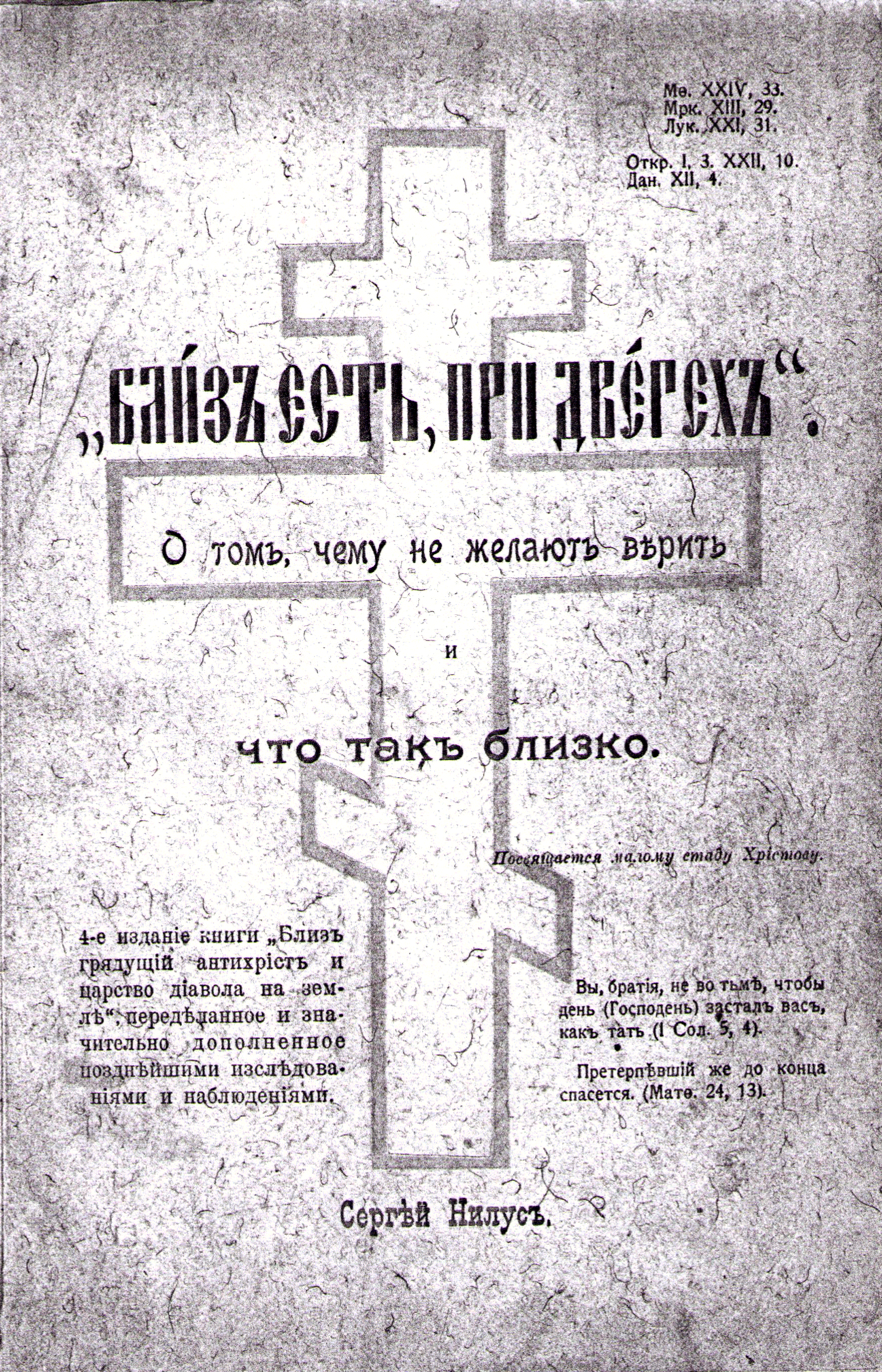
It is Near, At the Door, 1917 4th ed. PSM by Serge Nilus

- 1917 4th ed. Serge Nilus imprint that was the source of the USA translations published in 1920.

== In the United States ==
=== 1919 ===
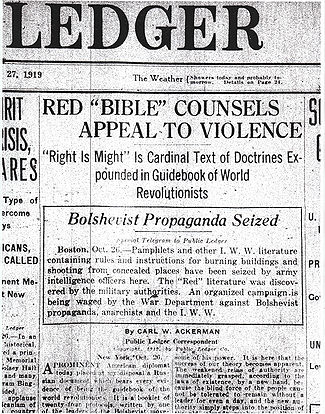
Red "Bible," Public Ledger (Philadelphia) October 27, 1919, by Carl W. Ackerman

Red "Bible" [1 of 2 in series]
Public Ledger (Philadelphia) [Front Page, Continued on Page 10, Column 2]
October 27, 1919
Reds Plot to Smash World and Then Rule with Universal Czar [2 of 2 in series]
Public Ledger (Philadelphia) [Front Page, Continued on Page 12, Column 2]
October 28, 1919

=== 1920.1 ===
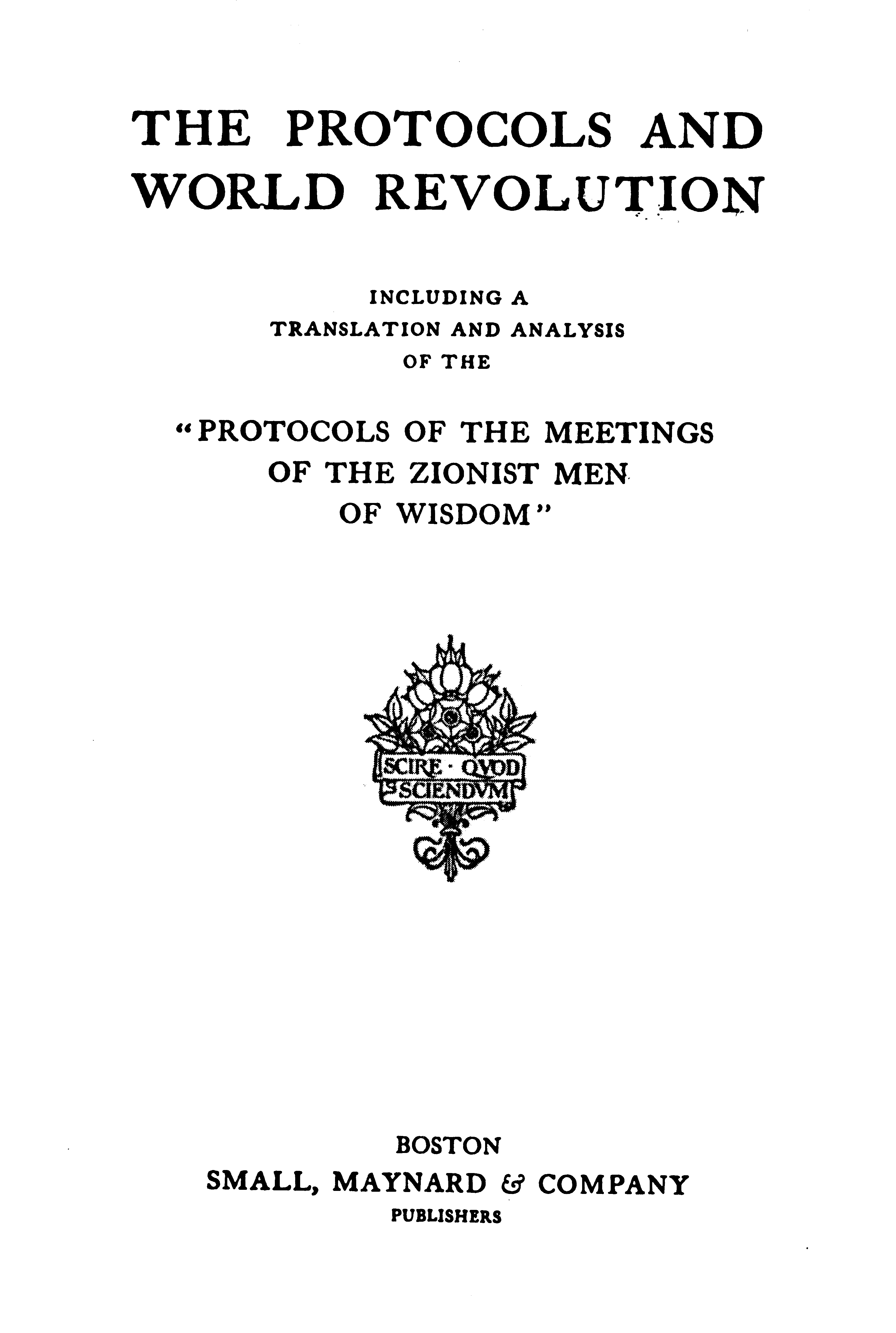
Title page

- Library of Congress card catalog:

LC Control No.: 83198259
Type of Material: Book (Print, Microform, Electronic, etc.)
Uniform Title: Protocols of the wise men of Zion.
Main Title: The Protocols and world revolution [microform]: including a translation and analysis of the Protocols of the meetings of the Zionist men of wisdom.
Published/Created: Boston: Small, Maynard & Co., c1920.
Related Names: Nilus, Sergi͡eĭ, 1862-1930.
Description: 149 p.; 22 cm.
Notes: "Based on a work by Sergi͡eĭ Nilus published in 1905 at Tsarskoje Selo"--Introd.
Call number of original: DS145.P5 1920.
Master microform held by: DLC.
Additional Formats: Microfilm. Washington, D.C.: Library of Congress Photoduplication Service, 1983. 1 microfilm reel; 35 mm.
LC Classification: Microfilm 83/612 (D)

- First American edition

=== 1920.2 ===
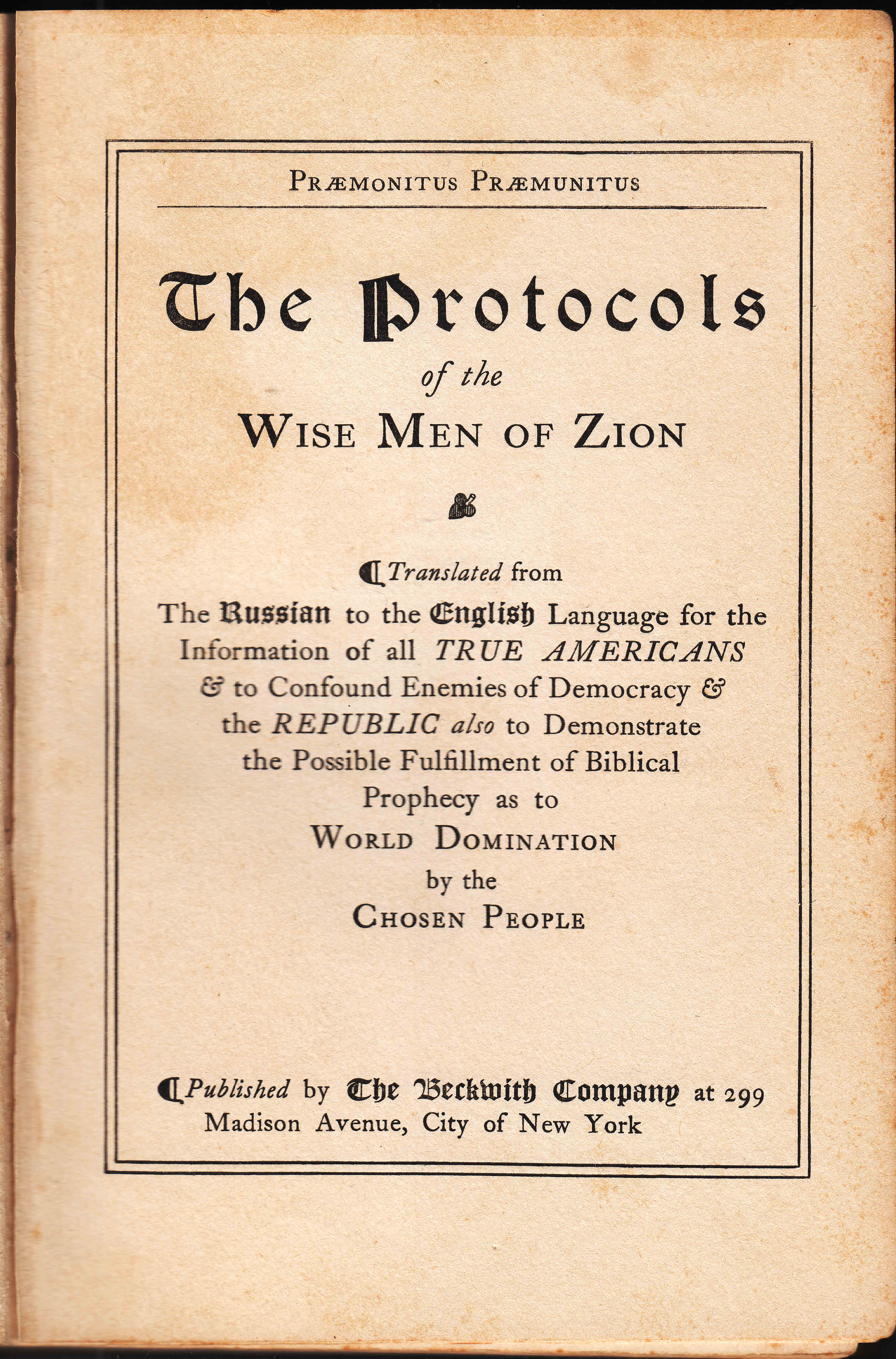
Title page, USA (1920)

- Library of Congress catalog card:

LC Control No.: 21001311
Type of Material: Book (Print, Microform, Electronic, etc.)
Uniform Title: "Protocols of the wise men of Zion." [from old catalog]
Main Title: Præmonitus præmunitus.

The protocols of the wise men of Zion,
tr. from the Russian to the English language for the information of all true Americans
& to confound enemies of democracy & the republic,
also to demonstrate the possible fulfillment of Biblical prophecy as to world domination by the Chosen people.

Published/Created: New York, The Beckwith company, 1920.
Related Names: Nilus, Serg-Y-Eief. [from old catalog]
Description: 2 p.l., iii-vii 165 p. front., 4 facsim. 21 cm.
Subjects: Jews.
Communism.
LC Classification: DS145 .P5 1920a
Second American Edition

=== 1920.3 ===
The International Jew: The World's Problem

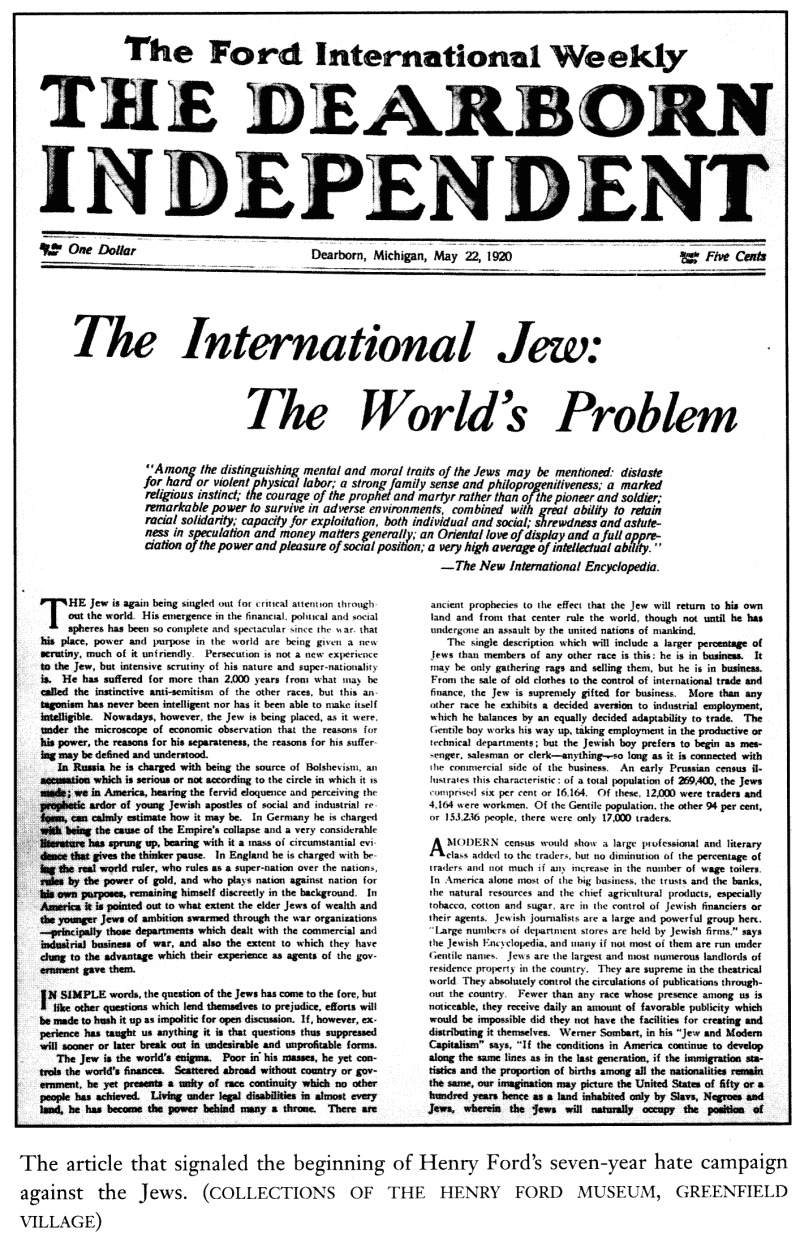
The International Jew, The World's Problem - 1920 articles in the Dearborn Independent

(The Dearborn Independent)

=== 1920–1922.4 ===
The International Jew: The World's Foremost Problem (Volume 1) (1920)

Jewish Activities in the United States (Volume 2) (1921)

Jewish Influence in American Life (Volume 3) (1921)

Aspects of Jewish Power in the United States (Volume 4) (1922)

=== 1934 ===
United We Fall, Divided We Stand
The Protocols of the Meetings of the Learned Elders of Zion
Translated from the Russian by Victor E. Marsden
Formerly Russian Correspondent of "The Morning Post"
With Preface and Explanatory Notes.
(Chicago: The Patriotic Publishing Co., 1934)

== In Britain ==
=== 1920 ===
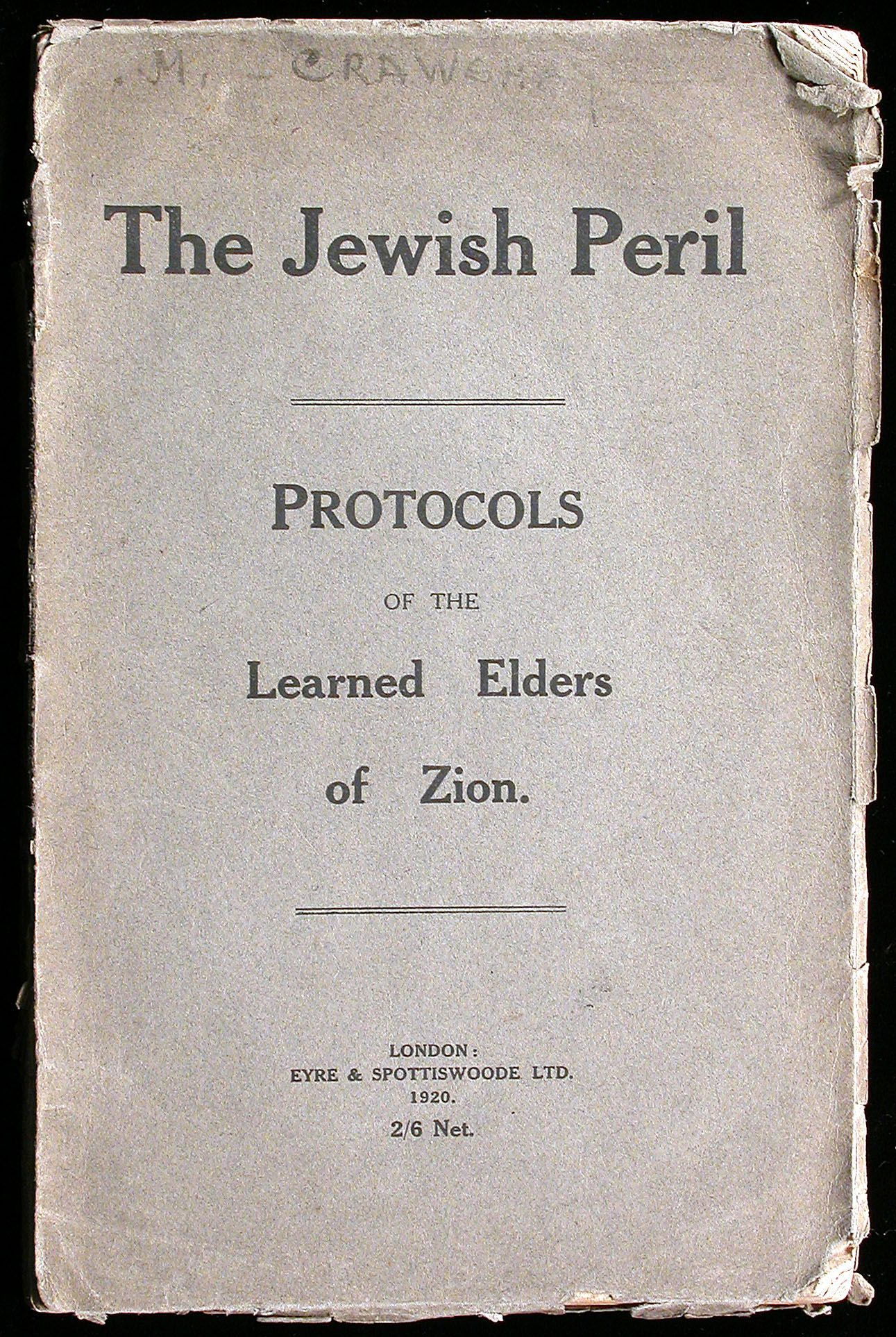
Cover, (Great Britain, 1920)

- Library of Congress card catalog:

LC Control No.: 21001691
Type of Material: Book (Print, Microform, Electronic, etc.)
Uniform Title: Protocols of the wise men of Zion.
Main Title: The Jewish peril: protocols of the learned elders of Zion.
Edition Information: Second edition.
Published/Created: London: Published by "The Britons," 62 Oxford Street, 1920.
Related Names: Nilus, Sergi͡eĭ, 1862-1930.
Britons.
Description: [2], vi, 96 p.; 22 cm.
Notes: Translation of S. Nilus' book: Velikoe v malom [title romanized] published at Tsarkoye selo, 1905, in which the Protocols were published for the first time.
Subjects: Antisemitism.
LC Classification: DS145 .P5 1920c
Other System No.: (OCoLC)13679570
Quality Code: premarc

- First British Edition, trans. George Shanks

=== 1920.5 ===
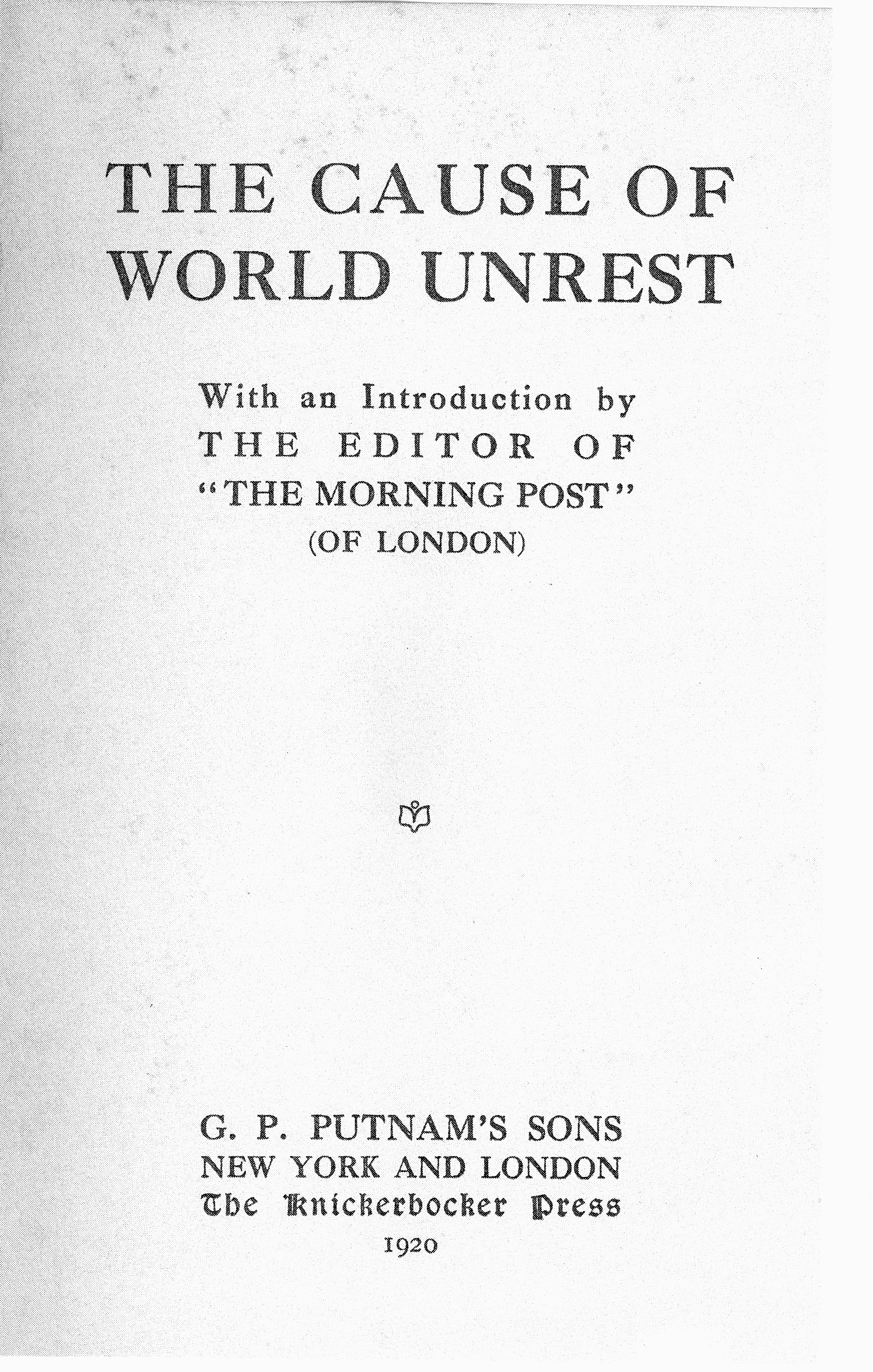
Introduction by H. A. Gwynne

The Cause of World Unrest

Related name: ed. & intro. Howell Arthur Gwynne
At the Library of Congress:
LC Control No.: 20019293
Type of Material: Book (Print, Microform, Electronic, etc.)
Main Title: The cause of world unrest; with an introduction by the editor of "The Morning post."
Published/Created: London, G. Richards, ltd., 1920.
Description: 269, [1] p. 20 cm.
Notes: "The main outline of the contents of this book is, in brief,
that there has been for centuries a hidden conspiracy, chiefly Jewish,
whose objects have been and are to produce :revolution, communism and anarchy."--Pref.
Subjects: Freemasons.

Jewish question.
Communism.

LC Classification: DS141 .C25 1920
Other System No.: (OCoLC)4811891

=== 1923 ===
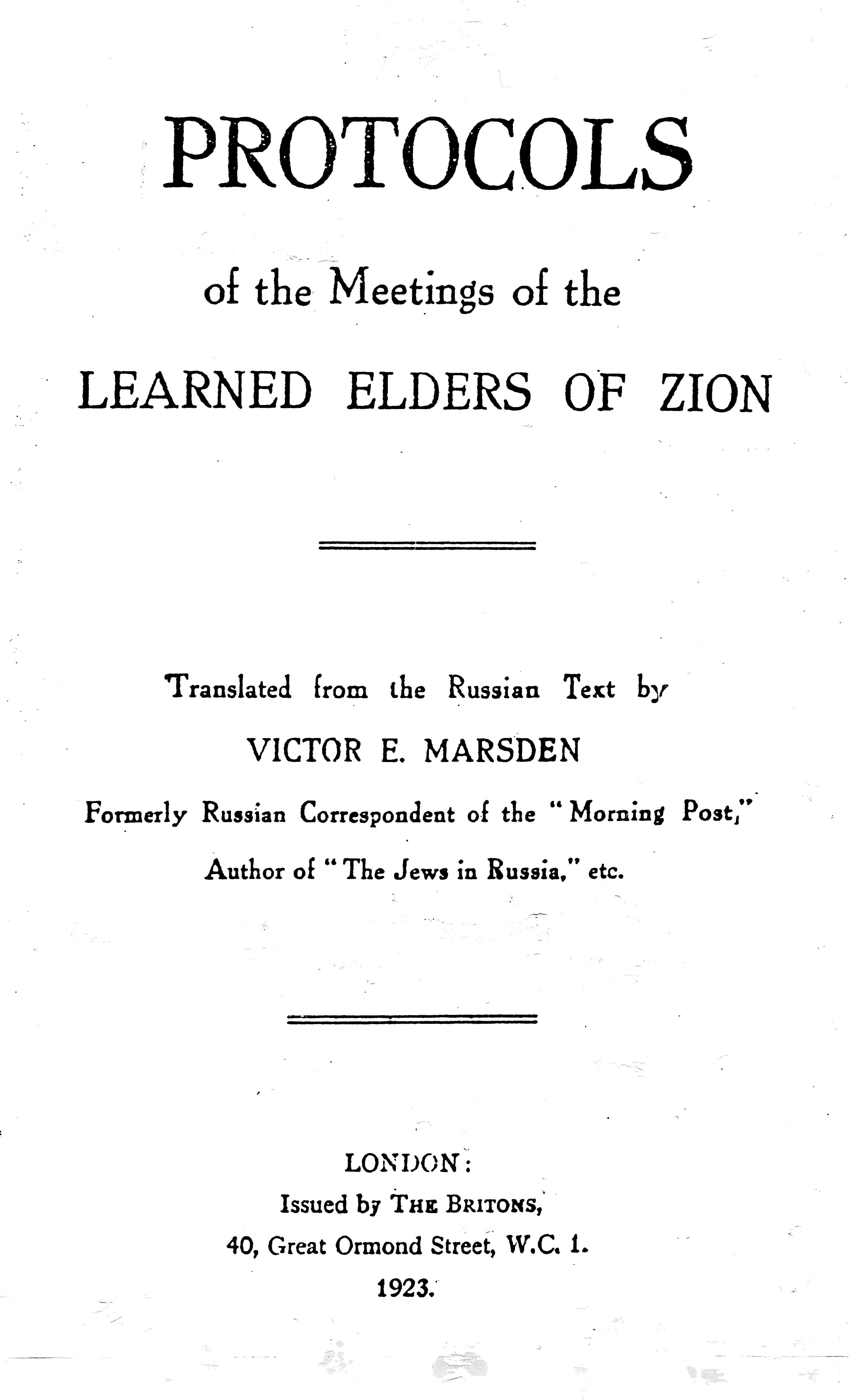
The Protocols of the Elders of Zion (1923), The Britons, Victor E. Marsden

Protocols of the meetings of the Learned Elders of Zion

Author: Victor E. Marsden, Victor E. Marsden
Language: English
Place of publication: London
Publisher: The Britons
Year of publication: 1923

Protocols of the Meetings of the Learned Elders of Zion

Translated from the Russian Text by Victor E. Marsden
(London: The Britons, 1923)

=== 1958 ===
World Conquest Through World Government: The Protocols of the Learned Elders of Zion

The earliest imprint in the British Library is as follows:

System number 002659964
Author – personal NILUS, Sergei Aleksandrovich.
Title World Conquest through World Government. The protocols of the Learned Elders of Zion.
Translated ... by Victor E. Marsden, etc. (Eighty-first impression.).
Publisher/year pp. 104. Britons Publishing Society: London, 1958.

== See also ==
- Contemporary imprints of The Protocols of the Elders of Zion
