= Antisemitic Propaganda: An Annotated Bibliography and Research Guide =

1982 bibliography of antisemitic works

- Author: Robert Singerman
- Language: English
- Subject: Antisemitism
- Publisher: Garland Publishing
- Publication date: 1982
- Publication place: New York
- Media type: Print (hardcover)
- Pages: 448
- ISBN: 0-8240-9270-8
- OCLC: 8033117
- Dewey Decimal: 016.3058924
- LC Class: Z6374.A56 S56 1982 DS141

Antisemitic Propaganda: An Annotated Bibliography and Research Guide is a 1982 book by Robert Singerman. It is a bibliographic listing of antisemitica items.

It contains more than 1,400 entries.

The list consists of a chronological listing, by year at least, of books, pamphlets, and other sorts of texts, with full bibliographic information. Most imprints of the Protocols of the Elders of Zion, not just first editions, that were published in Europe or the United States are listed and uniquely identified, as are many other noteworthy antisemitic publications.

The book's foreword is by Colin Holmes. As of 2007, the work is out of print.
