= Hitler was right =

Controversial statement and internet meme

"Hitler was right" and "Hitler did nothing wrong" are statements and internet memes either expressing support for Nazi dictator Adolf Hitler or trolling. The ironic or trolling uses of the phrase often allow those on the alt-right to maintain plausible deniability over their white supremacist, Nazi, or other far-right views.

== History and usage ==
=== Before the 21st century ===
In 1947, the Irgun abducted and summarily executed two British Army non-commissioned officers in what became known as the Sergeants affair, which led to national outrage and anti-Jewish riots across Britain. During the riots, angry mobs in North Wales wrote the words "Hitler was right" on Jewish properties. In Eccles, Greater Manchester, a crowd of around 700 people were told by a former sergeant major that "Hitler was right. Exterminate every Jew – every man, woman and child. What are you afraid of? There's only a handful of police." He was fined 15 pounds by the authorities for the statement. Colin Jordan, the leader of the British National Socialist Movement, argued in a 1962 speech titled "Hitler was right". Some witnesses recalled seeing banners stating "Hitler was right". In the early 1960s, Canadian neo-Nazi activist David Stanley distributed "Hitler was right" leaflets. In Germany in the 1960s, neo-Nazis were convicted for distributing "Hitler was right" leaflets.

=== 2000s ===
One of the most well known controversies relating to the 2001 World Conference against Racism was the unfurling of a giant sign saying Hitler was right among a crowd of 20,000 protesters.

=== 2010s ===
On June 29, 2011, a user posted on 4chan Hitler Did Nothing Wrong and the phrase has continued to be used since January 30, 2012. On August 2012, 4chan users attacked a third-party sponsored Mountain Dew campaign called "Dub the Dew", where internet users were asked to submit names for a new drink. The 4chan users have submitted several offensive names to make them appear at the top of the poll rankings, with the phrase Hitler Did Nothing Wrong being on the first place. As a result, the contest was shut down, with the company apologizing for the incident. Adweek compared the incident to another recent campaign hijacked under similar circumstances, where musician Pitbull was sent to perform in Kodiak, Alaska, in a Walmart promotion. An analysis by USA Today found that Teespring was selling T-shirts reading "Hitler Did Nothing Wrong" and one with an image of Bill Cosby paired with the slogan "drinks on me ladies".

A bullfighting stadium in Pinto, Madrid was vandalized by neo-Nazis in 2013 with the phrase (Spanish: ADOLF HITLER TENÍA RAZÓN, lit. 'ADOLF HITLER WAS RIGHT') accompanied with a swastika, prompting a condemnation from the town's mayor, a People's Party member. The incident was noted by both a Pew Research Center report and the Bureau of Democracy, Human Rights, and Labor's chapter on Spain.

The concept of "Hitler as a Hero" was listed by the Simon Wiesenthal Center as the top sixth most antisemitic slur in 2013, with the subject's entry stating that "'Hitler was right' has emerged as a rallying cry not only for neo-Nazis but increasingly among some Arabs and Muslims" against Israel.

The Microsoft chatbot Tay was trained in 2016 by internet users to use phrases such as "Hitler did nothing wrong" and "Hitler was right I hate the Jews". It was taken offline because of these statements.

People tweeting "Hitler was right" has been cited as an example of fascism on social media. A 2017 ProPublica investigation revealed that Facebook allowed advertisers to target users using antisemitic ad categories including "Hitler did nothing wrong".

In 2018, Steve West, known for his antisemitic, Islamophobic and homophobic statements, won the Republican primary for a district in the Missouri State House after stating "Hitler was right". The Missouri Republican Party did not endorse West. United States Rep. Mary Miller was criticized for stating the day before the 2021 United States Capitol attack that "Hitler was right on one thing. He said, 'Whoever has the youth has the future.'"

Welsh criminal Austin Ross went on a campaign of vandalistic acts and hate crimes from 2012 to 2018 which involved the defacement of locations across Newport, Wales. Ross carried out at least two arson attacks and regularly covered buildings with posters saying that "Hitler did nothing wrong."

=== 2020s ===
In 2020, four people were arrested for trespassing in Arizona after hanging a "Hitler was right" poster over a bridge.

In 2021, Palestinian BBC journalist Tala Halawa was fired after it was discovered she had tweeted "#Israel is more #Nazi than #Hitler! Oh, #HitlerWasRight #IDF go to hell. #prayForGaza." during the 2014 Gaza War. In response to her suspension, Halawa apologized for the tweet but insisted that she was the subject of character assassination by the Israel lobby.

On October 20, 2021, posters carrying the phrase were posted on the walls of a synagogue in Carmichael, California, by the far-right Aryan Nations terror group.
