= Boris Brasol =

Russian-American lawyer and literary critic (1885–1963)

Boris Leo Brasol
- Борис Львович Бразоль
- Born: Boris Lvovich Brazol; March 31, 1885; Poltava, Poltava Governorate, Russian Empire
- Died: March 19, 1963 (aged 77); New York City, United States
- Occupations: Lawyer, literary critic

Boris Leo Brasol, born Boris Lvovich Brazol (Russian: Борис Львович Бразоль; Ukrainian: Борис Львович Бразоль, romanized: Borys Lvovych Brazol; March 31, 1885 – March 19, 1963), was a Russian lawyer and literary critic. After the October Revolution he settled in the United States.

== Biography ==
Boris Brasol was born in Poltava (today in Ukraine), in 1885. His father was the homeopath Lev Evgenevich Brasol (aka Léon Brasol or Léon Brazol) (1854 – January 1927), who was Superintendent of the Petrograd Homoeopathic Hospital in St. Petersburg, Russia. After graduation from the law department of St Petersburg University, Boris served in the Imperial Russian Ministry of Justice, where he took part in the prosecution of the Beilis blood libel case, in which Jewish factory superintendent Menahem Mendel Beilis was accused of ritual murder. In 1912, Brasol was sent to Lausanne to study forensic science.

During World War I, Brasol held the rank of Lieutenant in the Tsar's army. In 1916, he was recalled from the front and sent to the United States to work as a lawyer for an Anglo-Russian purchasing committee. After the October Revolution broke out Brasol stayed in the United States.

During his time in the United States, Brasol was an ardent supporter of the restoration of the monarchy in Russia, and served as the official representative of Kirill Vladimirovich, Grand Duke of Russia in the United States. He was a founding member of the Russian Imperial Union-Order in 1929.

Brasol had an extensive publishing career in the United States. He published "Socialism vs. Civilization" (1920), "The World at the Cross Roads" (1921), "The Balance Sheet of Sovietism" (1922), "Elements of Crime" (1927), and "The Mighty Three: Poushkin, Gogol, Dostoievsky" (1934). In 1935, he founded the Pushkin Committee, and from 1937 until 1963 served as President of the Pushkin Society in America.

Several authors link Brasol's name with the first U.S. edition of The Protocols of the Learned Elders of Zion, which was titled "The Protocols and World Revolution, including a Translation and Analysis of the 'Protocols of the Meetings of the Zionist Men of Wisdom.'" Brasol pursued a successful career as a literary critic and criminologist and published several books in each of these fields.

Brasol was a virulent antisemite, and he said about his work on disseminating the English translation of the Protocols, that "Within the last year I have written three books, two of which have done the Jews more injury than would have been done to them by ten pogroms."

He also contributed to anti-Semitic writings in Henry Ford's The Dearborn Independent newspaper.

Brasol was member of Aufbau Vereinigung, which financed the Nazi Party. He received funding from American industrialist Henry Ford. In 1938, Brasol, who now had American citizenship, secretly helped organize an Anti-Comintern Congress in Germany with the support of the Gestapo. The assembly included representatives from Canada, France, England, and Switzerland. Heinrich Himmler showed interest in Brasol in August 1938, and even asked Heinrich Müller to compile a report on the previous activities of the white emigration.

He is buried in Woodlawn Cemetery, New York.

Some of his papers are preserved in the Library of Congress Manuscript Collection.

== Publications ==
- 1920: Socialism vs. Civilization. New York: Charles Scribner's Sons
- 1921: The World at the Cross Roads. London, Hutchinson
- 1922: The Balance Sheet of Sovietism. New York, Duffield
- 1927: Elements of Crime (Psycho-Social Interpretation). Oxford University Press
- 1934: The Mighty Three: Poushkin - Gogol - Dostoievsky. New York: William Farquhar Payson
- 1938: Oscar Wilde: the Man, the Artist, the Martyr. New York: Scribner's Sons

=== Translations ===
- 1949: F. M. Dostoevsky, The Diary of a Writer, trans. Boris Brasol. New York: Charles Scribner's Sons
- 1954: --do.-- New York: George Braziller

=== Protocols ===
- Anonymous

The Protocols and World Revolution
including a Translation and Analysis of the
"Protocols of the Meetings of the Zionist Men of Wisdom"
(Boston: Small, Maynard & Company, 1920)

A digital copy of the original 1920 text is currently available through Online Books Page:

.
