= Pavel Krushevan =

Russian journalist (1860–1909)

- Павел Крушеван
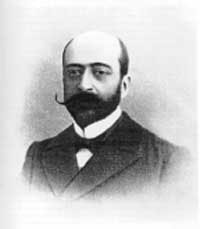
- Born: 27 January 1860; Ghindești, Bessarabia Governorate, Russian Empire (now Moldova)
- Died: 18 June 1909 (aged 49); Chișinău, Bessarabia Governorate, Russian Empire (now Moldova)
- Occupations: journalist, politician

Pavel Aleksandrovich Krushevan (Russian: Па́вел Алекса́ндрович Крушева́н; Romanian: Pavel or Pavalachii Alexandrovici Crușeveanu; 27 January [O.S. 15 January] 1860 – 18 June [O.S. 5 June] 1909) was a journalist, editor, publisher and an official in Imperial Russia. He was an active Black Hundredist and known for his far-right, ultra-nationalist and openly antisemitic views. He was the first publisher of The Protocols of the Elders of Zion.

== Biography ==
Born Pavolaki Krushevan into a family of impoverished Moldavian aristocrats in the village of Ghindești, Soroksky, in the Bessarabia Governorate of the Russian Empire (now Moldova), where he completed four grades of school. Krushevan's half-sister Sarah Borenstein (born Anastasia Krushevan) was a "pious Jewish woman" who had converted to Judaism. Sarah was married to Chaim Borenstein, the son of a shohet. Sarah alleged that her brother and her parents "beat her and threatened to drive her from their home" after they discovered her relationship with Chaim. Krushevan's newspaper published daily attacks on Sarah and Chaim, accusing the Jewish community of kidnapping Sarah, and offered a financial reward to anyone who could track down his sister "dead or alive." Sarah and Chaim fled Russia due to the threats, settling in Baltimore, Maryland, US.

Krushevan served as a clerk in Chișinău (Kishinev) City Duma. His writings were first published in 1882. From 1887 to 1896, he worked as a journalist at the newspapers Minsky Listok (Минский листок, "The Minsk Post"), Vilensky Vestnik (Виленский вестник, "The Vilna News"), and Bessarabsky Vestnik (Бессарабский вестник, "The Bessarabia News").

During the decade that followed, Krushevan founded and served as a publisher and editor of several newspapers:

- In 1897, a Chișinău daily newspaper Bessarabets (Бессарабец, "The Bessarabian") which published materials fomenting anti-Semitism. Krushevan was reported as being one of the initiators of the Kishinev pogrom in April 1903.
- In 1903, Saint Petersburg daily newspaper Znamya, where the first version of The Protocols of the Elders of Zion was published in serial form from 28 August to 7 September O.S. 1903.
- In 1906, Chișinău newspaper Drug (Друг, "The Friend").

Krushevan promoted nationalist and racist views and was brought to court numerous times for slander, verbal offenses and physical threats. After a homicide attempt by a Pinkhus Dashevsky, it was reported that Krushevan lived in constant fear, kept weapons close at hand and was accompanied by a personal cook out of fear of being poisoned.

In 1903 a riot started after an incident on 6 February when a Christian boy, Mikhail Rybachenko, was found murdered in the town of Dubăsari (Dubossary), about 25 miles north of Chișinău. Although it was clear that the boy had been killed by a relative (who was later found), Krushevan's Bessarabets insinuated that he was killed by the Jews, which instigated the Kishinev pogrom.

In 1905 Krushevan organized the Bessarabian Patriotic League. He founded the Bessarabian branch of the Union of the Russian People.

Despite his Moldavian origin, Krushevan had fierce pro-Russian views, and some articles in his newspaper, Drug, had a strong anti-Romanian sentiment. For example, in January 1906, Krushevan wrote: "a circle was formed whose purpose is to open Romanian schools in Bessarabia, to teach the Romanian language, to develop the taste for Romanian literature. In a word, the first step has been taken which, fatally, will lead to antagonism and separatism. The people have too little time to learn Russian and Romanian books at once. And, of course, most of them will prefer to learn in their native language, the Romanian one. So alienation from Russia is inevitable".

From 1906 to 1909 he served as a speaker of Chișinău city in the Duma. In 1907 Krushevan was elected to represent Chișinău in the 2nd Russian State Duma.

== See also ==
- History of the Jews in Bessarabia
- History of the Jews in Russia and the Soviet Union
