= Robert Singerman =

- Born: 1942 (age 83–84)
- Known for: Internationally recognized Judaica Scholar
- Scientific career
- Workplaces: University of Florida

Robert Singerman (born 1942) is a librarian, and a recognized Judaica bibliographer. He is often cited by Judaica rare book dealers. He holds the position of university librarian, George A. Smathers Libraries, University of Florida, where he was the bibliographer for Jewish studies, anthropology, and linguistics.

For 27 years Singerman served as the University of Florida, Judaica librarian and bibliographer. He retired in June 2006. He first came to the university in 1979 having previously served at the Klau Library of the Hebrew Union College-Jewish Institute of Religion in Cincinnati. In 1981, when the Price Library of Judaica was formally established at the university, Singerman commenced his tenure there, first as librarian, the only librarian to date. During the span of his long career at the university he was instrumental in increasing the size of the Judaica collection, from 24,000 volumes, to over 85,000 cataloged volumes.

== Works ==
- —— (1981). "The American Career of the "Protocols of the Elders of Zion"". American Jewish History. 71 (1): 48–78. ISSN 0164-0178. JSTOR 23882005.
- —— (1982). Antisemitic Propaganda: An Annotated Bibliography and Research Guide. New York: Garland Publishing. ISBN 978-0-8240-9270-2.

The Library of Congress holds twelve titles under his name; he is the author of several bibliographic texts including the following:

- Jewish Serials of the World
- Judaica Americana
- Spanish and American Jewry
