= Znamya (newspaper) =

Russian newspaper

- Type: Newspaper
- Publisher: Pavel Krushevan
- Editor: Pavel Krushevan
- Founded: 1902
- Ceased publication: 1903
- Political alignment: Far-right; Antisemitism; Ultranationalism
- Language: Russian
- Headquarters: Saint Petersburg

Znamya ("Banner", Russian: Знамя, Russian: [ˈznamʲə]) was a newspaper established by ultra-nationalist Black Hundreds journalist Pavel Krushevan in Saint Petersburg. It is known for printing the first published version of the "Protocols of the Elders of Zion" in the issues of August–September 1903. This version has never been translated from Russian.

== Bibliographical controversies ==
There is no consensus regarding the start time of the newspaper. The main source of controversy is "Brockhaus and Efron Encyclopedic Dictionary", a Russian analogue of 1911 Encyclopædia Britannica.

- Article "Znamya, a newspaper in St.-Petersburg" ("Russian: Знамя, с.-петербургская газета") says that this newspaper was established by its editor and publisher Krushevan in 1902 and describes the position of this edition as "extreme misoneism and anti-Semitism".
- However, the article "Krushevan, Pavel Alexandrovich" says that "Znamya" was established at the end of 1903, and that "this newspaper was short-lived".

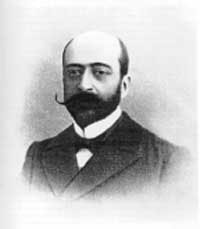
Pavel Krushevan

Given the fact that the issues containing the scandalous publication of "Protocols of the Elders of Zion" came out in print in August–September, the assertion about the end of 1903 is a misprint. An additional indirect indication favouring this assumption is the numbering of these issues (nn.190–200). De Michelis and Richard Newhouse also claim that "the Nilus version with its preface was published for the first time in the St.Petersburg newspaper Znamja (1903)".

As for the discrepancy between the "end of 1902" and the "beginning of 1903", it is a trivial case for dating events in the pre-revolutionary Russian Empire. Only in 1918 did the Bolsheviks abandon the Julian calendar (which already lagged behind in the 20th century by 13 days) and introduce the Gregorian calendar, as in United States and Europe.

Minor controversy may arise due to confusion caused by the similarity of the names of newspapers, which were subsequently founded by the same Pavel Krushevan, and which reflected in that or another way his same anti-Semitic bias. These are the above-mentioned "Znamya" (end 1902–1903) and "Russkoye Znamya" ("Russian Banner", Russian: Русское Знамя, 1905–1917).

== Protocols' publication ==
According to Cesare G. De Michelis in The Non-Existent Manuscript: A Study of the Protocols of the Sages of Zion (2004), the first publicly published edition of the Protocols of the Elders of Zion was in August (13 days later in September by the Old Style) of 1903 in Znamya.

The text was serialized into nine issues, each carrying a headline "The Jewish Programme of the Conquest of the World" (Russian: Программа завоевания мира евреями). Actually the document itself was entitled "The Protocols of the Sessions of the World Alliance of Freemasons and of the Sages of Zion", however by giving such a headline the editor anticipated, if not imposed, perceptions and conclusions of the readers.

The Znamya edition of the Protocols contained several notable differences from later editions. For example, it included Old Testament quotes later omitted. It made no mention of the Freemasons, which are prevalent in later editions. Paraphrases of Maurice Joly were mostly, but not entirely, lacking. This edition of the Protocols has never been translated.
