= Sergei Nilus =

Russian religious writer (1862–1929)

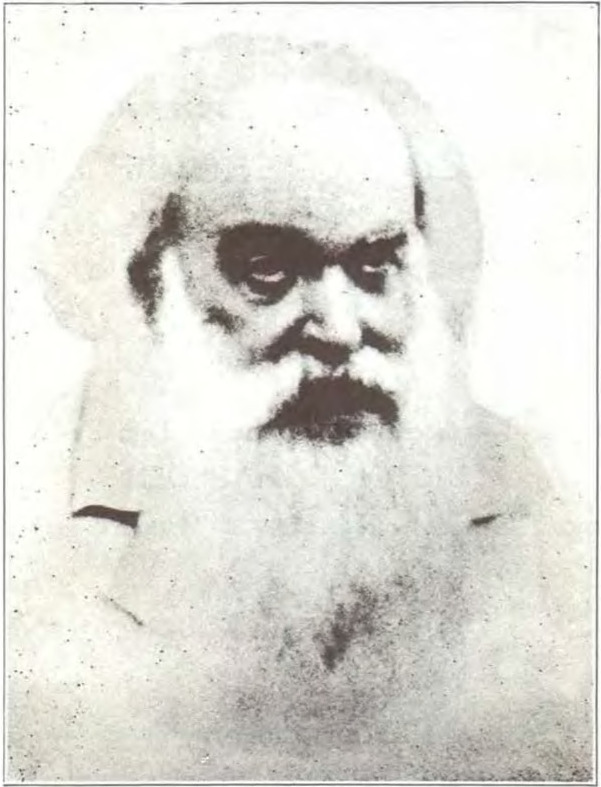
Photograph of Sergei Nilus, published in the frontispiece of a 1934 English translation of the Protocols.

Sergei Aleksandrovich Nilus (also Sergius, and variants; Russian: Серге́й Алекса́ндрович Ни́лус; 9 September [O.S. 28 August] 1862 – 14 January 1929) was a Russian religious writer and self-described mystic.

His book Velikoe v malom i antikhrist, kak blizkaja politicheskaja vozmozhnost. Zapiski pravoslavnogo ("The Great within the Small and Antichrist, an Imminent Political Possibility. Notes of an Orthodox Believer", 1903), about the coming of the Antichrist, is now primarily known for the fact that in its second edition, in 1905, Nilus published the pseudohistory Protocols of the Elders of Zion as his final chapter. This was the first time that this text was published in full in Russia (an abridged version had reportedly been published in 1903 in the newspaper Znamya). He wrote a number of further books, mostly on topics of the end times and the Antichrist, published between 1908 and 1917. After the Russian Revolution, his works were banned after being titled anti-Soviet propaganda in the Soviet Union.

== Life ==
Sergei Nilus was born on 9 September [O.S. 28 August] 1862 in Moscow, the son of Alexander Petrovich Nilus, a landowner in the governorate of Orel. His father was a Lutheran of Livonian extraction (the surname Nilus is a Livonian form of Nicholas), his mother was from Russian nobility. Sergei was baptized in the Russian Orthodox Church. He studied law and graduated from the University of Moscow, and was a magistrate in Transcaucasia. He later moved to Biarritz, living there with a mistress named Natalya Komarovskaya until his estates went bankrupt and she broke off their relationship. Though he was raised in the Russian Orthodox Church, Nilus did not care much about his religion until an accident with his horse caused him to recall an unfulfilled childhood vow to visit the Troitse-Sergiyeva Lavra. Later he met St. John of Kronstadt, whom Nilus credited with both healing a throat infection and turning him back to his Christian faith.

In 1903, Nilus published his book Velikoye v malom i antikhrist kak blizkaya politicheskaya vozmozhnost'. Zapiski pravoslavnogo veruyushchego (The Great Within the Small and Antichrist, an Imminent Political Possibility. Notes of an Orthodox Believer). The text of the Protocols appeared as Chapter Twelve of the 1905 reprint of the book. The newly appointed chairman of the Council of Ministers, Pyotr Stolypin, ordered an investigation into the provenance of the text, and it was soon discovered that it had first appeared in antisemitic circles in Paris, around the year 1897 or 1898.

In 1906, Nilus married Yelena Alexandrovna Ozerova, who had served as a lady-in-waiting to Alexandra Feodorovna, last empress of Russia. In 1907, the Niluses moved into a small house just outside the Optina Monastery near Kozelsk, where he lived until 1912. During that time he published several books on spiritual topics. One, intriguingly, was to become his most widely read book and one which the last Tsar and Empress were to read during their last incarceration at the Ipatiev House, On the Banks of the River of God, a diary of Nilus' years at Optina.

Nilus discovered the papers of Nikolay Motovilov, a member of the Russian nobility, Fool for Christ, and a disciple of St. Seraphim of Sarov. Nilus published one of Motovilov's manuscripts as "A Wonderful Revelation to the World: The Conversation of St. Seraphim with Nicholas Alexandrovich Motovilov on the acquisition of the Holy Spirit". In 1912, a report was received by the Holy Synod that Nilus was living inside the monastery with his wife. Although the Niluses were not actually living within the monastery, but rather as guests in a small house nearby, Nilus was ordered by the Synod to leave Optina.

Nilus circulated several editions of The Protocols in Russia during the first decade of the twentieth century. Though the early prints were in Russian, The Protocols soon spread to the rest of Europe via anti-communist Russian refugees who fled after the October Revolution. The Russian text was also reprinted in Berlin, in 1922. Meanwhile, due to censorship in the Soviet Union, Nilus was unable to publish any further writings until his death in 1929.

After the fall of the Soviet Union in 1991, Nilus' works were again edited in Russia, beginning in 1992, with an edition of his collected works appearing in five volumes in 2009.

== Bibliography ==
- 1903 «Великое в малом» ("The Great Within the Small"), 2nd ed. 1905, 3rd ed. 1911.
- 1908 «Сила Божия и немощь человеческая» ("The Power of God and the Weakness of Man")
- 1908 «Пшеница и плевелы» ("The Wheat and the Tares"), Holy Trinity-St. Sergeius Lavra.
- 1911 «На берегу Божьей реки» ("On the Bank of God's River"), 2nd ed. 1916; reprinted by Orthodox Christian Books and Icons, San Francisco, Calif., 1969.
- 1911 «Святыня под спудом. Тайны православного монашеского духа» ("Holiness Under a Bushel. Secrets of the Orthodox Monastic Spirit")
- 1911 «Близ грядущий антихрист и царство диавола на земле» ("The Coming Antichrist and the Kingdom of the Devil on Earth Is Near"); reprinted 1992.
- 1917 «Близ есть при дверех. О том, чему не желают верить и что так близко» ("Close by, at the Gates. What They Do Not Want to Believe and Which Is That Close By"); reprinted 1997, 2012, 2013.

Posthumous editions:

- «С. А. Нилус. Полное собрание сочинений» (Collected Works in Five Volumes), Moscow, 2009.
