= Conspiracy theories in Turkey =

Conspiracy theories are a prevalent feature of culture and politics in Turkey. Conspiracism is an important phenomenon in understanding Turkish politics. This is explained by a desire to "make up for lost Ottoman grandeur", the humiliation of perceiving Turkey as part of "the malfunctioning half" of the world, and a "low level of media literacy among the Turkish population."

== History and Roots ==
The development of conspiracy theories in Turkey has been connected to the country's historical backgrounds, political instability, and the deep-rooted issues between foreign interferences. The collapse of the Ottoman Empire to this day remains a painful memory for some Turks who believe Western influences contributed to its collapse. This has shaped conspiracy narratives that portray foreign powers and minority groups as threats to Turkey’s government and national security. The 1920 Treaty of Sèvres, which proposed the division of Ottoman territories amongst Allied powers, transformed into a crucial part of history within Turkish politics. While this treaty was never fully executed, the whole idea and potential for a divide is what developed what is commonly known today as "Sèvres Syndrome." This syndrome refers to the recurrent fear that foreign governments are working against Turkey and ultimately trying to weaken them as a whole. These tensions have shaped the many conspiracies that represent the Western countries as threats to the Turkish nation.

Political distrust is one of the main contributors that makes these conspiracy theories so prominent. Sociologist, Türkay Salim Nefes has extensive research within the world of Anti-Semitic conspiracy theories. Nefes examines particularly on the Dönme community, which essentially are descendants of Jewish who converted to Islam, are commonly thought of as secretive groups that have hidden political influences. Through his research, Nefes had found that the right-wing party were a lot more likely to immerse themselves with the secretive political activity, while the left-wing typically streered away from those types of narratives. Consipracy theories aren't results only of misinformation, rather, a reflection of political beliefs and the insecurities that help emphasize them.

Turkish author and journalist Mustafa Akyol describes the reason for the prevalence of conspiracy theorizing in Turkey as "it makes us feel important. If the world is conspiring against us, we must be really special. It is, I believe, the way we Turks make up for our lost Ottoman grandeur." Turkish economist Selim Koru has pointed to the humiliation of perceiving Turkey as part of the "malfunctioning [half]" of the world.

Turkish consumers are the second-most media illiterate when compared to countries in Europe, leaving them especially vulnerable to fake news, a 2018 report released by the Soros Open Society Institute said. A combination of low education levels, low reading scores, low media freedom and low societal trust went into making the score, which saw Turkey being placed above only North Macedonia. According to the Reuters Institute Digital News Report 2018, Turkey with some distance is the country with most made-up news reports in the world. The largest peddlers of conspiracy theories are often Turkish news outlets and social media which makes avoiding conspiracy theories nearly impossible. Social media presents a unique challenge to media literacy due to the fact that "bots" or fake accounts have a financial incentive to produce outrageous content. The more traction social media accounts get, the more money that is generated for the account user.

=== Fall of the Ottoman Empire ===
The Ottoman Empire spanned parts of Europe, Asia, and Africa and included diverse ethnic and religious communities, such as Turks, Kurds, Greeks, Armenians, Jews, and Arabs. Those who identified as Muslims generally had more citizen rights. Ottoman leaders introduced reforms that aimed to promote unity. Ottoman leaders introduces a new national identity, which sought to establish an inclusive civic identity and equality among Ottoman subjects regardless of their ethnic or religious backgrounds. However, these efforts were resisted by nationalist movements among minority groups. Turks view the involvement of foreign countries and the nationalist movements as proof that foreign power seek to weaken Turkey.

=== 1920 Treaty of Sèvres ===
In 1920 the Treaty of Sèvres proposed dividing former Ottoman territories among the Allied powers and creating arrangements for Kurdish and Armenian territories. Turkish nationalists led by Mustafa Kemal Atatürk rejected the treaty and declared War for Independence which lasted from 1919 to 1923. The conflict ended with the Treaty of Lausanne in 1923 which established Turkey's modern borders, and the Republic of Turkey was established that same year. The collapse of the Ottoman Empire and the proposed division of its territories contributed to fears that foreign powers would use minority groups to weaken the new Turkish Republic.

=== Sèvres Syndrome ===
Sèvres Syndrome is the widespread conspiratorial views about foreign powers and the internal groups that seek to weaken or divide the Turkish Republic. This conspiracy narrative has shaped educational content, views of the European Union, government policies favoring isolationism, foreign relations, and responses to the Kurdish insurgency. Kerem Karaosmanoğlu refers to it as "mother of all conspiracy theories in Turkey." This fear has been subsequently abused by Turkish politicians who have used political polarization and national distrust to divide people and legitimize their own authoritarian regime.

== Distinct features ==
Mustafa Akyol argues that Turkey's official political discourse is shaped by anti-Western conspiracy narratives that portray terrorist groups as working together to bring about the country's downfall. A distinct feature of conspiracy theorizing in Turkey is that at the alleged command and control end of an alleged conspiracy scheme is usually narrated to be governments because the worldview taught in the Turkish education system is massively focused on the state.

Doğan Gürpınar, a scholar whose areas of study include nationalism, historiography, and ideologies in Turkey, argues that conspiracism's power to shape intellectual discourse and ideological standpoints and to represent the state tradition is "unique to Turkey".

Research done by Türkay Salim Nefes and Ozan Aksoy provide deeper insight into the characterstics of conspiracy theories in Turkey by carefully analyzing the relationship between political partisanship and the beliefs from the theories. The research shows tthat individuals are a lot more likely to believe conspiracy theories when they align with the particular party's interests. This ultimatley implies that the theories aren't necessarily believed equally amongst everyone, but varies on one's political and religious affiliations.

The research studied how these types of beliefs came to life during the Gezi Park Protests in 2013, when large rallies against the Turkish government took place across the country. Before the protests, individuals that supported the opposing party were a lot more likely to believe conspiracy theories which insinuatesthat foreign powers were intervening with Turkish politics. Researchers also found that religiosity influenced how people understood these specific narratives, especially when the claims go hand in hand to religious ideas and threats to religious freedoms.

These findings show that the conspiracy theories in Turkey are intertwined to political and religious identities. It can be used by different types of political groups to help explain events and show how certain individuals as threats to the country itself. It also backs up the importance of the state in these conspiracy narratives, political leaders heavily sway which groups are portrayed as enemies. Overall, the conspiracy theorizing in Turkey is a unique situation because of how strongly it is able to be influenced by its political interests and values.

== Political and Social Consequences ==
=== Political legitimacy ===
The concept of üst akıl describes a powerful and secretive force believed to control the public sphere in Turkey socially and politically. Politicians use this to justifying government actions, discredit opposing views, protect political power, and gain public support. Research by Karaosmanoglu (2021) proves that some politicians will use conspiracy theories to discredit other views and to protect their own political power. Üst akıl (“mastermind”) is a term Turkish leaders use for an omnipresent group said to oppose Turkey’s rise. Scholarship describes it as an all-powerful, sinister agency that has been socially and politically influential in Turkey’s public sphere. After the Gezi protests, Erdoğan named “the Mastermind” as the reason behind the protests in 2013 and Turkey’s difficulties. He spoke of operations against Turkey with a mastermind behind them, and told his audience they knew who it was. In 2015 the pro-government channel A Haber aired a documentary called Mastermind, which presented the group as almost entirely Jewish.

=== Nationalism ===
The Sèvres syndrome is a popular belief in Turkey that dangerous internal and external enemies are working to weaken and divide the country. The term has been applied to the Kurdish conflict, to Turkey’s accession to the European Union, and to recognition of the Armenian Genocide. Research by Nefes (2023) shows that Turkish politicians used the Sevres syndrome when talking about Armenians, often making them out to look like a threat to the country. Within nationalist circles, the Nationalist Movement Party (MHP) has a long record of hostility toward European integration. In the 1970s its founder Alparslan Türkeş rejected the European Common Market, arguing it would indirectly implement the Treaty of Sèvres by letting foreigners buy land in Turkey, and the party saw the EU as an extension of the Allied powers of World War I. The party’s tone softened somewhat after Turkey’s 1999 candidacy, when it was part of the governing coalition. In 2015 MHP leader Devlet Bahçeli likened the government’s peace process agreement with the pro-Kurdish HDP to the Treaty of Sèvres.

=== Strengthening the Ruling Elites ===
Conspiracy theories about terrorism can serve the political interests of Turkey's ruling elite by attributing national security threats to foreign plots and portraying the country's leadership as a major force facing powerful international opposition. More broadly, people and political groups may turn to conspiracy theories when they struggle to explain complex social and political developments they oppose or use them to ease fears about perceived. Reserch shows us that political leaders might use conspiracy theories to earn public support and to weaken the opposition groups.

=== The Justice and Development Party (AKP) ===
The AKP party has been the majority power in Turkey since 2002 and describes itself as a religiously conservative party that participates in economic liberalism which makes it different from previous conservative political parties. In its early years the party brought social reforms, economic growth, expanded civil rights, and created a peace initiative with the Kurds. While some view the group as an Islamic threat, others view it as an Islamic democracy. However, since their rise to power and new leaders stepping in, the party has become a key player in the issue of political polarization. Scholars say the party uses monopolistic leadership and majoritarian legitimacy which is used to suppress other political opinions, especially younger people. While they are not exclusively to blame for the level of polarization the AKP party has played a large role.

== List of conspiracy theories ==
- Anti-Israel and antisemitism: In the course of the 2006 Crimean–Congo hemorrhagic fever outbreak in Turkey, Felicity Party member Abdullah Uzun claimed that the tick species that spread the disease was brought to Turkey by Israeli female tourists. In May 2012, a dead European bee-eater with an Israeli leg-band, used by naturalists to track migratory birds, was found by villagers near the southeastern Turkish city of Gaziantep. The villagers worried that the bird may have carried a micro-chip from Israeli intelligence to spy on the area and alerted local officials. The head of the Agriculture and Livestock Provincial Directorate in Gaziantep, Akif Aslanpay, examined the corpse of the bee-eater and stated that he found that "the nose of the bird is very different and much lighter than others" and that it "can be used for audio and video," which, "in the case of Israel, they do." A counter-terrorism unit became involved before Turkey's agriculture ministry assured villagers that it is common to equip migratory birds with rings in order to track their movements. The BBC correspondent, Jonathan Head, ascribed the event to his view that "wildly implausible conspiracy theories take root easily in Turkey, with alleged Israeli plots among the most widely believed."
- Armenian genocide is invented: Turkish Armenian genocide denialists typically argue the academic consensus of it being a genocide as anti-Turkish propaganda or as a conspiracy spread by the Armenians, instead claiming that it either did not occur or that it was somehow justified at the time.
- COVID-19 misinformation: After the COVID-19 pandemic started in early 2020, false information regarding the virus's place of origin, treatment and diagnosis was widely spread through social media and news outlets. Specifically, an Islamic activist and scholar named Abdurrahman Dilipak who wrote for a national Islamic newspaper perpetuated the idea that Covid-19 was a global conspiracy from China, the US, and the UK set out to destroy the world and Turkey. He was highly influential at the time and was the most followed Covid conspirast on the social media X (formerly known as Twitter). That caused an "infodemic," as dubbed by the World Health Organization, though this was a global phenomenon and not unique to Turkey. The numerous false claims regarding the treatment of the virus caused harm on various fronts in the fight to subdue it.
- Death of Özal: Some people believe that Turgut Özal, 8th president of Turkey, was assassinated in 1993. The main supporters of this theory are Özal's wife Semra Özal and their son Ahmet Özal. Retired brigadier-general Levent Ersöz was accused of the "assassination" and tried, but was found innocent and received an amnesty. Özal's body was exhumed in 2012 for an autopsy following long discussions and controversy over his death.
- HAARP: After the 2023 Turkey–Syria earthquake that took place on February 6, 2023, millions of Twitter posts claimed that the earthquake was caused by the powerful HAARP transmitters in Alaska, USA. Similar claims were also made for the 1999 İzmit earthquake.
- Mastermind narrative: The term "mastermind" (Turkish: üst akıl) denotes the alleged command and control institution, somewhat ambiguously placed with the government of the United States, in a comprehensive conspiracy to weaken or even dismember Turkey. Erdoğan as well as the Daily Sabah have often alleged that very different non-state actors, like the Salafi jihadist Islamic State of Iraq and the Levant (ISIL), the Kurdistan Workers' Party (PKK) and the Islamist cult with political ambitions around Fethullah Gülen, were attacking Turkey at the same time in a well-coordinated campaign. Journalist Ömer Turan asserted that Netflix Turkey's teaser trailer for Money Heist contained messages aiming to incite the "second wave" of the Gezi Park protests.

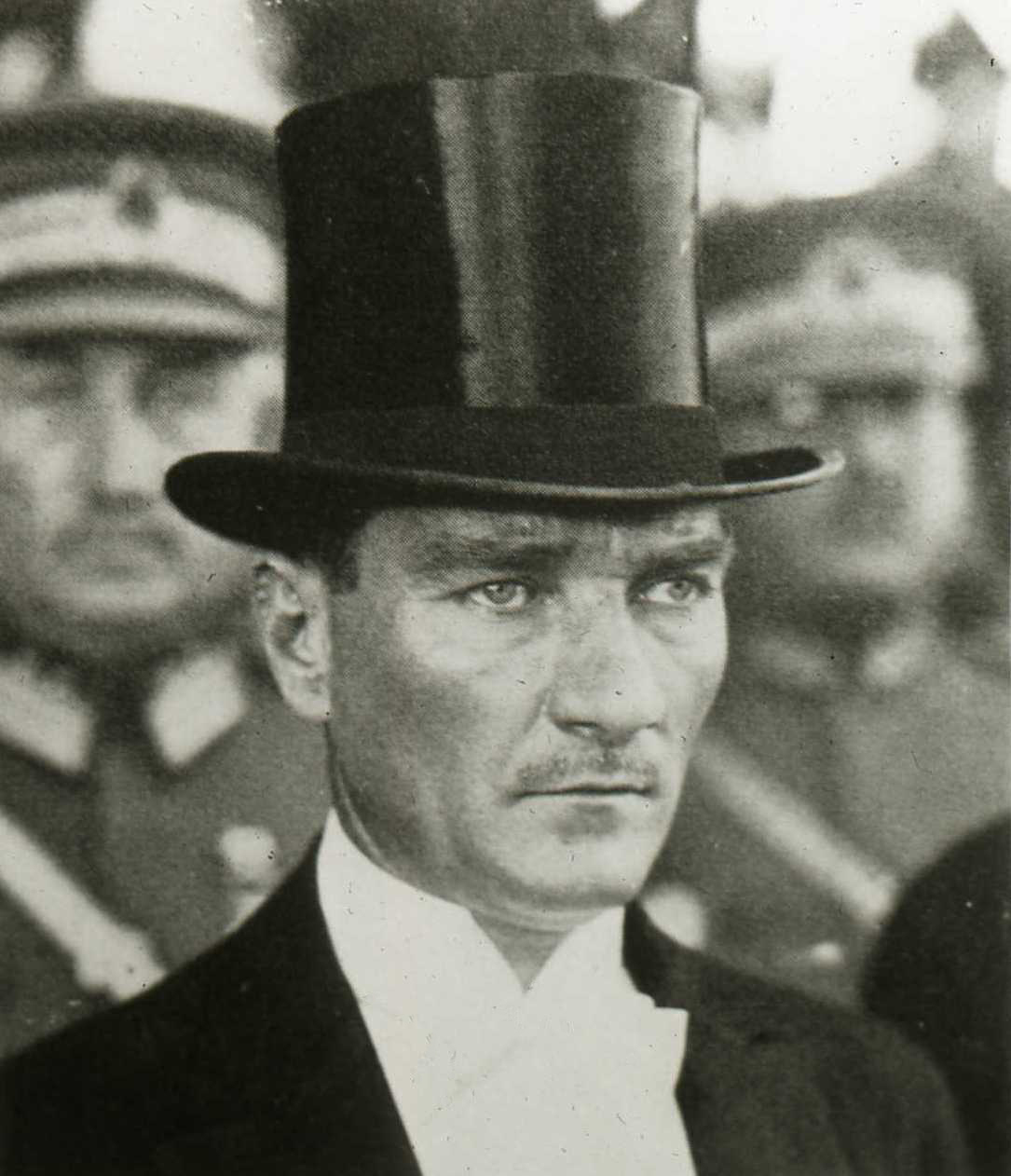
Atatürk with a top hat, a common male headgear in the West at the time (1925). His many reforms secularizing Turkey have made Atatürk the target of Islamist conspiracy theories.

- Modernism and secularism: The belief that the modernist and secularist movements and reforms in the Ottoman Empire and the Turkish Republic were Judeo-Masonic conspiracies is dominant among Islamists. Because of their adherence to traditionalist elements and their creation of cults of personality for the Ottoman sultans, Islamists portray anything contrary to Islamic tradition as evil. According to them, the constitutionalist movement ended absolute monarchy, the end of traditional religious institutions, and the introduction of a secular state were the work of Jews, Freemasons, or Dönmes. For example, according to their conspiracy theory, Mustafa Kemal Atatürk was a Dönme.
- Mustafa Kemal Atatürk: Various conspiracy theories against Atatürk, the founder of the Republic of Turkey, have been put forward by Islamist circles who did not support his secularist reforms. Kadir Mısıroğlu, known for his hatred of Atatürk, is behind many conspiracy theories about Atatürk. One of these conspiracy theories is that Anatolia was invaded by the Greeks as a result of Atatürk's agreement with the United Kingdom to overthrow the caliphate. Another conspiracy theory about Atatürk is that he was poisoned to death by the Freemasons due to the closure of Masonic lodges in Turkey in 1935. In 2015, Yeni Şafak claimed that İsmet İnönü was in charge of planning the murder.
- Recep Tayyip Erdoğan: In 2007, the bestselling book in Turkey was Musa'nın Çocukları: Tayyip ve Emine (The Children of Moses: Tayyip and Emine) by Ergün Poyraz. Poyraz claims that there is an international Jewish conspiracy pulling the strings behind the world, including installing Erdoğan as prime minister of Turkey.
- Sèvres syndrome: A reference to the Treaty of Sèvres of 1920, there is a popular belief in Turkey that dangerous internal and external enemies, especially the West, are "conspiring to weaken and carve up the Turkish Republic".
- Treaty of Lausanne: Islamists have put forward many conspiracy theories about the Treaty of Lausanne. For example, it was claimed in civil and formal circles that the treaty would expire in 2023. According to the conspiracy theory, Turkey was forbidden to mine its natural resources (such as boron and petroleum) due to the "secret articles" of the treaty, and therefore, Turkey would rapidly become a developed country by mining and exporting its resources once the treaty expired.
- War against Islam, also called the "War on Islam" or "Attack on Islam", is a conspiracy theory narrative in Islamism discourse to describe an alleged Islamophobic conspiracy to harm, weaken or annihilate the societal system of Islam, using military, economic, social and cultural means. The perpetrators of the conspiracy are alleged to be non-Muslims, particularly the Western world and "false Muslims", allegedly in collusion with political actors in the Western world. While the contemporary conspiracy theory narrative of the "War against Islam" mostly covers general issues of societal transformations in modernization and secularization, as well as general issues of international power politics among modern states, the Crusades, are often narrated as its alleged starting point. The English-language political neologism of "War on Islam" was coined in Islamist discourse in the 1990s and popularized as a conspiracy theory only after 2001.
- Wahhabism and The Memoirs of Mr. Hempher are linked in a popular conspiracy theory prevalent in neo-Ottomanist and Turkish far-right circles. The theory claims that the modern Salafi-Wahhabi movement was a British and Zionist psychological operation intended to weaken the Ottoman Empire and facilitate Zionist control over Palestine. Proponents of this conspiracy theory argue that the United Kingdom supported the Arab Revolt to facilitate the occupation of Palestine, which was under Ottoman rule before the revolt.
- Istanbul nightclub shooting: Some Turkish citizens, journalists, and pro-AKP journals such as Sabah put forward conspiracy theories claiming that agencies from Western countries, such as the CIA, organized the attack.

== The impact of political polarization ==
The political divide in Turkey has divided neighbors and friends. 74% of Turks would not engage in business with someone of a differing political party while 68% say they would not want their children to play with other children from families of a differing political party.

== See also ==
- Adnan Oktar
- American political conspiracy theories
- Büyük Doğu
  - Necip Fazıl Kısakürek
- Cevat Rıfat Atilhan
- Conservatism in Turkey
- Deep state
  - Deep state in Turkey
- Millî Görüş
  - Necmettin Erbakan
- Neo-Ottomanism
- Xenophobia and discrimination in Turkey
  - Antisemitism in Turkey
- Ulusalcılık

== Bibliography ==
- Baer, Marc David (2013). "An Enemy Old and New: The Dönme, Anti-Semitism, and Conspiracy Theories in the Ottoman Empire and Turkish Republic". Jewish Quarterly Review. 103 (4): 523–555. doi:10.1353/jqr.2013.0033. S2CID 159483845.
- Göçek, Fatma Müge (2011). The Transformation of Turkey: Redefining State and Society from the Ottoman Empire to the Modern Era. London: I.B.Tauris. ISBN 9781848856110.
