= International Jewish conspiracy =

Antisemitic conspiracy theory

The international Jewish conspiracy or the world Jewish conspiracy is an antisemitic trope that has been described as "one of the most widespread and long-running conspiracy theories". Although it typically claims that a malevolent, usually global Jewish circle, referred to as International Jewry, conspires for world domination, the theory's content is extremely variable, facilitating its wide distribution and long-standing persistence. It was popularized especially in the late nineteenth and early twentieth century by the antisemitic fabricated text The Protocols of the Elders of Zion. Among the beliefs that posit an international Jewish conspiracy are Jewish Bolshevism, Cultural Marxism, Judeo-Masonic conspiracy theory, White genocide conspiracy theory and Holocaust denial. The Nazi leadership's belief in an international Jewish conspiracy that it blamed for starting World War II and controlling the Allied powers was key to their decision to launch the Final Solution, which culminated in the Holocaust.

== History ==
Belief in an international Jewish conspiracy for world domination can be traced back to the thirteenth century, but increased in the second half of the nineteenth century under the influence of writers such as Frederick van Millingen, an Ottoman Army officer who wrote The Conquest of the World by the Jews in 1873, and Hermann Goedsche, a Prussian agent provocateur promoting a new ideological antisemitism. The invention of the newspaper invited the new accusation that Jews controlled the press. Goedsche's novel Biarritz was plagiarized in the antisemitic forgery The Protocols of the Elders of Zion published at the turn of the twentieth century. The Protocols appeared in print in the Russian Empire as early as 1903, published as a series of articles in Znamya, a Black Hundreds newspaper. The forgery was a creation of the Okhrana secret police. The Protocols popularized the belief in an international Jewish conspiracy such that this belief became essential to modern antisemitism. According to Armin Pfahl-Traughber, the Protocols are "the most significant document for propagating the myth of a Jewish world conspiracy".

Belief in this conspiracy increased following the Russian Revolution, spread at first by frustrated Tsarist exiles. English conspiracy theorist Nesta Webster recycled the older Illuminati conspiracy theories with a new emphasis on the role of Jews to explain the revolution. In the second half of the twentieth century, as overt antisemitism became increasingly unacceptable, many conspiracists found detours to avoid explicitly referencing Jews while retaining conspiracy theories descended from the Protocols and earlier beliefs of a Jewish world conspiracy. The Judeo-Masonic conspiracy theory asserts that Freemasons are the agents of an international Jewish conspiracy. Holocaust denial presupposes the existence of a massive Jewish conspiracy that (according to Holocaust deniers) perpetrated the biggest hoax in history in order to scam money out of Germany and found the state of Israel. This conspiracy may be present either implicitly or explicitly in Holocaust denying works. As of the 1970s, the expression Zionist Occupation Government (ZOG) has been used by antisemites to refer to the supposed Jewish control over Western countries.

== By country ==
=== China ===
Some Chinese people believe that Jews secretly rule the world and are business-minded. Hongbing Song, a Chinese American IT consultant and amateur historian, published the Currency Wars series, believing Jewish financiers have controlled the international banking systems since the era of Napoleon. Song also says in his book that the key functions of the Federal Reserve were ultimately controlled by five private banks, including Citibank, all of which maintained "close ties" with the Rothschild family, who he said led to the 1997 financial crisis. The book became a bestseller and even has been read by some high-ranking Chinese officials.

=== Germany ===
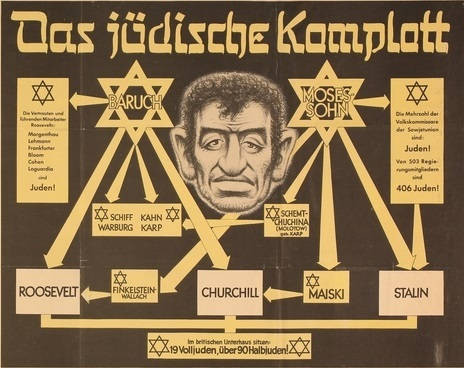
Nazi propaganda poster entitled Das jüdische Komplott ("The Jewish Plot")

In his first recorded political speech in 1919, Adolf Hitler claimed that there was an international Jewish conspiracy plotting to weaken the Aryan race and Germany.

In documenting the appearance of fascism from the end of WWI to the end of WWII, the historian Michael Kellogg noted that adherents of the "sinister world-wide Jewish" conspiracy theory included monarchist emigres who formed the Aufbau Vereinigung, a conspiratorial antisemitic group that sought to re-establish a Tsar in Russia while perpetrating right-wing terrorism in Germany. The Aufbau cooperated with, and included as members, early German Nazis such as Max Erwin von Scheubner-Richter. The group, with its emphasis on claiming a Protocols-like myth, would influence the ideologies of Hitler and Alfred Rosenberg, mainly from 1918 to 1923, when Scheubner-Richter was killed by German police officers during the Beer Hall Putsch.

The leaders of Nazi Germany believed that World War II was a conflict pitting Germany against a massive conspiracy secretly engineered by Jews and fronted by the Allies. According to this conspiracy theory, Franklin D. Roosevelt, Winston Churchill, and Joseph Stalin were merely puppets for the Jews. Nazi propaganda repeatedly accused "International Jewry" of starting and extending the war and plotting the extermination of Germany. Hitler and other Nazi leaders repeatedly stated that they would "exterminate" Jews before the Jews had a chance to enact this alleged plot. Nazi propagandists drew on earlier Jewish conspiracy tropes and updated The Protocols of the Elders of Zion with prominent individuals from Europe and North America. According to historian Jeffrey Herf, it was the Nazis' conspiratorial beliefs about Jews, rather than older antisemitic beliefs, that caused them to resort to extreme anti-Jewish violence. "The desire for a Final Solution to the Jewish question was inseparable from the Nazis' view of the Jews as an internationally organized political power that was playing a decisive role in the events of World War II."

Germany invaded the Soviet Union in 1941 under the pretext of fighting Judeo-Bolshevism. By August 1941, Nazi propaganda was already making radical assertions suggesting a global war against Jews. American entry into World War II prompted Nazi ideologues to plunge into further extremism, who claimed that an international coalition of communism and capitalism, led by a sinister "Jewish world conspiracy" were seeking the destruction of Aryan race. Radicalization of antisemitic discourse went hand in hand with Nazi Germany's intensification of anti-Jewish persecutions and genocide.

According to historian Jeffrey Herf, the Nazis used the purported international Jewish conspiracy to answer "such seemingly difficult questions as, Why did Britain fight on in 1940 rather than negotiate? Why was it likely that the Soviet regime would collapse like a house of cards following the German invasion of June 1941? Why did Franklin Roosevelt oppose Hitler? Why did the anti-Hitler coalition remain intact as the Red Army continued to push toward Central Europe after spring 1943?" Nazi belief in a powerful, international Jewish conspiracy pulling the strings of world affairs was not dispelled by the ease with which the German Jewish community was expropriated and forced into exile.

=== Malaysia ===
Former Malaysian prime minister Mahathir Mohamad has repeatedly asserted that Jews control the world by proxy.

=== Turkey ===
In 2007, the bestselling book in Turkey was Musa'nın Çocukları: Tayyip ve Emine (The Children of Moses: Tayyip and Emine) by Ergün Poyraz. Poyraz claims that there is an international Jewish conspiracy pulling the strings behind the world, including installing Recep Tayyip Erdoğan as prime minister of Turkey.

=== United States ===
In The International Jew: The World's Foremost Problem, American industrialist Henry Ford largely recycled the Protocols and did more than any other American to promote them. During the First Red Scare, United States Congress investigated the veracity of the Protocols. The Protocols of the Elders of Zion were well-received by some conservative evangelicals in the 1920s and 1930s. However, even those evangelicals who believed that there was an international Jewish conspiracy against Christianity did not consider themselves anti-Jewish and hoped that Jews would convert to Christianity. By the end of the 1930s, the belief in an international Jewish conspiracy came to be discredited in conservative evangelical circles as it was seen as inconsistent with world events, especially the rise of Nazi Germany.

In the early 1990s, Christian televangelist Pat Robertson's book The New World Order was criticized by The New York Review of Books, the Anti-Defamation League, and others for his apparent promotion of the conspiracy. Robertson was said to have "relied on the work of Nesta Webster and Eustace Mullins".

In 2020, pro-Trump campaigner Mary Ann Mendoza was removed from the schedule of the Republican National Convention after she retweeted a thread asserting a Jewish conspiracy to take over the world. In 2021, it was reported that almost half of QAnon followers believed that there is a Jewish plot to take over the world.

== See also ==
- New World Order conspiracy theory

== Sources ==
- Ariel, Yaakov (2013). "Evangelical Christians and Anti-Jewish Conspiracy Theories". An Unusual Relationship: Evangelical Christians and Jews. New York University Press. ISBN 978-0-8147-6293-6.
- Baer, Marc David (2013). "An Enemy Old and New: The Dönme, Anti-Semitism, and Conspiracy Theories in the Ottoman Empire and Turkish Republic". Jewish Quarterly Review. 103 (4): 523–555. doi:10.1353/jqr.2013.0033. S2CID 159483845.
- Bangerter, Adrian; Wagner-Egger, Pascal; Delouvée, Sylvain (2020). "How Conspiracy Theories Spread". Routledge Handbook of Conspiracy Theories. Routledge. doi:10.4324/9780429452734-2_5. ISBN 978-0-429-45273-4. S2CID 214062615.
- Herf, Jeffrey (2006). The Jewish Enemy: Nazi Propaganda during the World War II and the Holocaust. Harvard University Press. doi:10.4159/9780674038592. ISBN 978-0-674038-59-2.
- Konda, Thomas Milan (2019). Conspiracies of Conspiracies: How Delusions Have Overrun America. University of Chicago Press. doi:10.7208/chicago/9780226585932.001.0001. ISBN 978-0-226-58593-2. S2CID 198104368.
- Rathje, Jan (2021). "'Money Rules the World, but Who Rules the Money?' Antisemitism in post-Holocaust Conspiracy Ideologies". Confronting Antisemitism in Modern Media, the Legal and Political Worlds. Vol. 5. De Gruyter. pp. 45–68. doi:10.1515/9783110671964-005. ISBN 978-3-11-067196-4.
