= Fulanisation conspiracy theory =

Islamophobic and Anti-Fulani conspiracy theory in Nigeria

A Fulani herder in Borno State, Nigeria.

Fulanisation is a conspiracy theory in Nigeria that alleges there is a plan by the Fulani people to Islamise Nigeria, supported by the Nigerian government. The theory claims that cattle movement and rural banditry are cover operations to displace largely Christian indigenous farmers permanently from their ancestral lands as a form of Jihad, and that political authorities intentionally enable herder migrations or protected armed groups.

== Background ==
Herder–farmer conflicts in Nigeria have deep roots and date back to pre-colonial times (before the 1900s). However, these conflicts have become far more severe in recent decades due to population pressures, climate change, and various other factors. During the British colonial era, herders and farmers would agree on a system called burti, in which specific migration routes were set up for herders, with mutual agreement from the farmers, herders, and local authorities. However, the burti system collapsed around the 1970s when farmers increasingly claimed ownership of lands along cattle migration paths, increasingly leading to conflicts.

Before, herders frequently exchanged milk for cereal grains with farming communities. However, in recent decades, milk is no longer being widely bartered as packaged beverages became more popular in towns.

Modern medicines have also made it possible for herders to move their livestock further south into the "tsetse fly zone" in the south, whereas before, herders could not keep their cattle on a large scale due to tropical diseases in humid climate zones. Starting from those implemented by the British colonial administration, tsetse control programs have reduced the threat of diseases such as trypanosomiasis. Today, herders also have easy access to drugs for trypanosomiasis and dermatophilosis in order to keep their livestock alive. In addition, over the past several decades, herders have cross-bred trypanosome-intolerant zebu cattle with trypanosome-tolerant humpless breeds, thereby increasing the cattle's tolerance of tropical diseases. All of these factors have enabled the widespread migration of Fulani herders into the southernmost areas of Nigeria, where they could easily sell their livestock for higher prices due to strong demand for beef and other meat products in Nigeria's populous southern towns and cities. However, in the south, they would encounter sedentary communities that have not historically had any experience with peacefully negotiating and co-existing with nomadic herders. Increasing ease of access to weapons and religious polarisation among both Christians and Muslims have added to the potential for violence.

Since the Fourth Nigerian Republic's founding in 1999, farmer–herder violence has killed more than 19,000–28,551 people and displaced hundreds of thousands more,most of them are Christian. It followed a trend in the increase of farmer–herder conflicts throughout much of the western Sahel, due to an expansion of agriculturist population and cultivated land at the expense of pasturelands; deteriorating environmental conditions, desertification and soil degradation; population growth; breakdown in traditional conflict resolution mechanisms of land and water disputes; and proliferation of small arms and crime in rural areas. Insecurity and violence have led many populations to create self-defence forces and ethnic and tribal militias, which have engaged in further violence. The majority of farmer–herder clashes have occurred between Muslim Fulani herdsmen and farmers, exacerbating hostilities.

== History and spread ==
The theory first gained popularity in the mid-2010s, the term gained significant national prominence following a 2018 open letter by former Nigerian President Olusegun Obasanjo, which accused President Muhammadu Buhari's administration of clannishness, nepotic appointments, and poor management of internal political dynamics. Subsequent media commentaries and public debates framed these criticisms around a perceived Fulanisation or Islamisation agenda. Digital platforms enabled social media influencers to amplify raw, emotive, and unverified content regarding land disputes and security conflicts, embedding an us versus them framing within the public sphere, particularly around the 2019 and 2023 general elections.

=== Government response ===
Attempts by the Nigerian government to counter online narratives, such as the proposed 2019 National Commission for the Prohibition of Hate Speeches Bill faced pushback from civil society groups and academics as attacks on freedom of speech.

== Political influence ==
=== Among ex-officials ===
Olusegun Obasanjo claimed in 2019 the aim of Boko Haram insurgents was the "Fulanisation and Islamisation" of Nigeria.

=== Indigenous People of Biafra ===
The Fulanisation conspiracy theory has contributed to Anti-Fulani sentiment within IPOB, Emma Powerful, a IPOB leader, claimed that "Fulani expansionism" is a threat to Biafran independence, and that Muhammadu Buhari had encouraged it.
