= The Children of Moses =

2007 book by Ergün Poyraz

The Children of Moses (Turkish: Musa'nın Çocukları) is an antisemitic book written by Ergün Poyraz, originally published in 2007, which mainly targets Recep Tayyip Erdoğan but also his wife, Emine Erdoğan, and the Justice and Development Party (AKP).

== Background ==
Ergün Poyraz had written many other books in the past mainly targeting Recep Tayyip Erdoğan and Emine Erdoğan but also the AKP, Abdullah Gül, Bülent Arınç, Deniz Baykal, and Fethullah Gülen, accusing them of being agents and secret Jews working for Israel or the United States with a common interest against Turkey.

== Synopsis ==
The book accused Recep Tayyip Erdoğan and Emine Erdoğan of being Crypto-Jews working with Israeli intelligence, posing as Turks to internally destroy Turkish society by purposely increasing Islamism as a way of weakening Turkish secularism, and in turn making Turks more religious and vulnerable to being manipulated with religion, therefore taking control of Turkey for the sake of Israel. The book also quoted Recep Tayyip Erdoğan in various instances where he declared that he was Georgian and that his wife was Arab, and that they do not consider themselves Turkish. Hostile statements of Erdoğan towards Turkey and its foundation were also cited. His interactions with Jewish organizations were cited as well. He was described as taking extensive measures to convince the public that he is a Muslim Turkish patriot. The United States and United Kingdom were also accused of assisting him and Israel in their work against Turkey.

== Reception and aftermath ==
After the release of the book, Ergün Poyraz faced a turning point in his career, as he previously was never in trouble with Turkish authorities. Recep Tayyip Erdoğan took legal action against Poyraz, and won 4 thousand liras. In the verdict, Poyraz and the company which published the book were also ordered to pay a compensation of 20 thousand liras, and cease all publications of the book.

Immediately after the release of the book, Ergün Poyraz had to go under Gendarmerie protection due to the threats he received, as well as fears for his life. After an order from the Beşiktaş Chief Prosecutor's Office, the police went to his house, guarded by the gendarmerie, and arrested him on July 27, 2007. İsmail Yıldız, who published articles criticising Erdoğan, was also arrested in the same week, in which Erdoğan had filed 60 separate lawsuits against Yıldız. The reason given for the arrest of Poyraz was his alleged involvement in Ergenekon, although his lawyer claimed that the arrests of Poyraz and Yıldız were part of the same operation targeting critics of Erdoğan. Poyraz remained in jail, and in 2013, was sentenced to 29 years in prison, and was released in 2014 after serving over 6 years.
