= Ergün Poyraz =

Turkish author

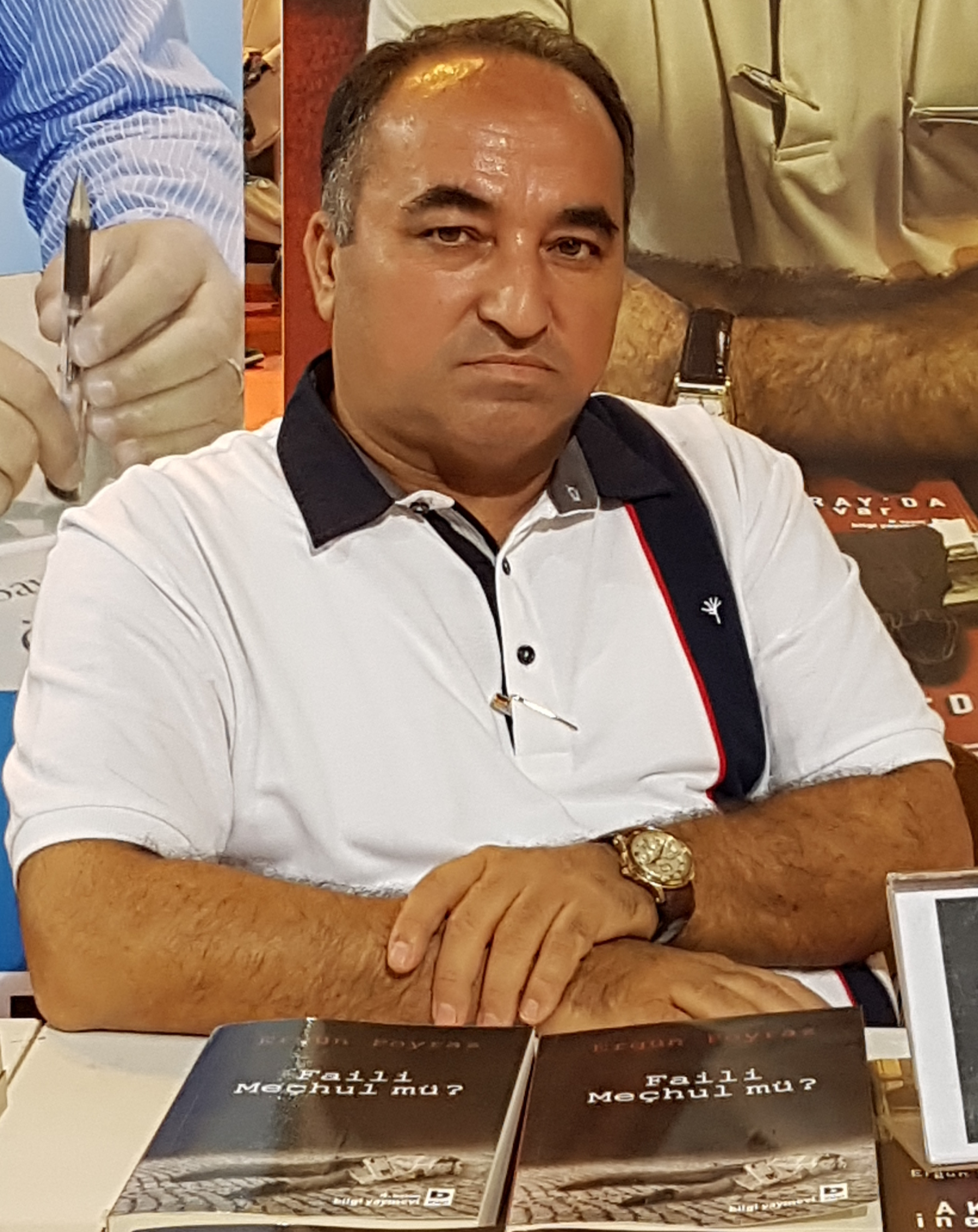
- Poyraz in 2016
- Born: January 31, 1963 (age 63); Istanbul, Turkey
- Occupation: Author

Ergün Poyraz (born 31 January 1963) is a prolific Turkish author known for his controversial books about the ruling Justice and Development Party, the Islamic preacher Fethullah Gülen, and people associated with them. He is best known for his 2007 book The Children of Moses (Turkish: Musa'nın Çocukları), which accused Prime Minister Recep Tayyip Erdoğan and his wife of being secret Jews and of cooperating with Israeli intelligence to undermine Turkish secularism. He was arrested in 2007 and was a defendant in the Ergenekon trials; on 5 August 2013, he was sentenced to 29 years in prison.

== Life ==
Poyraz graduated from the Yıldız Technical University.

He was described as an extremely secular Turkish ultranationalist.

According to Milliyet, Poyraz contributed to the 1998 closure of the Welfare Party (RP) "by presenting to the Constitutional Court [secret] footage of RP leader Necmettin Erbakan's speeches."

Poyraz's 2007 book The Children of Moses accused Prime Minister Recep Tayyip Erdoğan and his wife of being secret Jews and cooperating with Israeli intelligence to undermine Turkish secularism. His another book The Rose of Moses contains similar allegations about President Abdullah Gül. It was the second best-selling book in Turkey in 2007. He later released a book titled From the Army of the Caliphate to the Arab Kurdish Party, with "Arab Kurdish Party" referring to the AKP. At the time of his 2007 arrest Poyraz appears to have been working on a book about Deniz Baykal.

In 2013, Poyraz lost a libel case brought on behalf of the preacher Fethullah Gülen, the leader of the controversial Islamic Gülen movement, over his book Amerika'daki İmam ("The Imam in America").

== Ergenekon ==
He was arrested in 2007 and charged with membership of the Association for the Union of Patriotic Forces (VKGB), which is said to be linked to the Ergenekon organization. According to Taraf, Poyraz was paid by the JITEM military intelligence unit; General Levent Ersöz has also spoken of payments to Poyraz.

According to media reports, the Turkish Gendarmerie bought thousands of copies of Poyraz' books.

In August 2013, he was sentenced to 29 years and 4 months in prison. He was released on March 11, 2014 after his sentence time was reduced.

In April 2022 he was severely beaten in front of his house in Kuşadası district of Aydın and hospitalised.

== Some of his books ==
- Fethullah’ın Gerçek Yüzü / Said-i Nursi’den Demirel ve Ecevit’e ("The Real Face of Fethullah: From Said-i Nursi to Demirel and Ecevit"), Otopsi, İstanbul, 2000.
- Misyonerler Arasında Altı Ay ("Six Months Among Missionaries"), 2004
- Kanla Abdest Alanlar ("Those Who Perform their Ablutions with Blood"), Togan Yayıncılık, İstanbul, 2007.
- Musa'nın Çocukları: Tayyip ve Emine ("Children of Moses: Tayyip and Emine"), Togan Yayıncılık, 2007
- Musa'nın Gül'ü ("The Rose of Moses"), Togan Yayıncılık, 2007
- Patlak Ampul ("Broken Lamp"), Togan Yayıncılık, İstanbul, 2007.
- Amerika'daki İmam ("The Imam in America"), 2009, about Fethullah Gülen
- Takunyalı Führer, Togan Yayıncılık, İstanbul, 2010, critical of Recep Tayyip Erdoğan
- Tarikat, Siyaset, Ticaret ve Cinayet: Masonlarla El Ele, Togan Yayıncılık, 2011
- İplikçi: Kirli İlişkiler Yumağı, Tanyeri Kitap, 2013
