= Replacement theory =

Replacement theory may refer to:

- The Avril Lavigne replacement conspiracy theory, a humorous internet conspiracy theory
- Recent African origin of modern humans, in paleoanthropology, the dominant model of the geographic origin and early migration of anatomically modern humans
- The Great Replacement, a white nationalist conspiracy theory
- The Melania Trump replacement conspiracy theory, a political conspiracy theory
