= Death hoax =

False report of a person's death

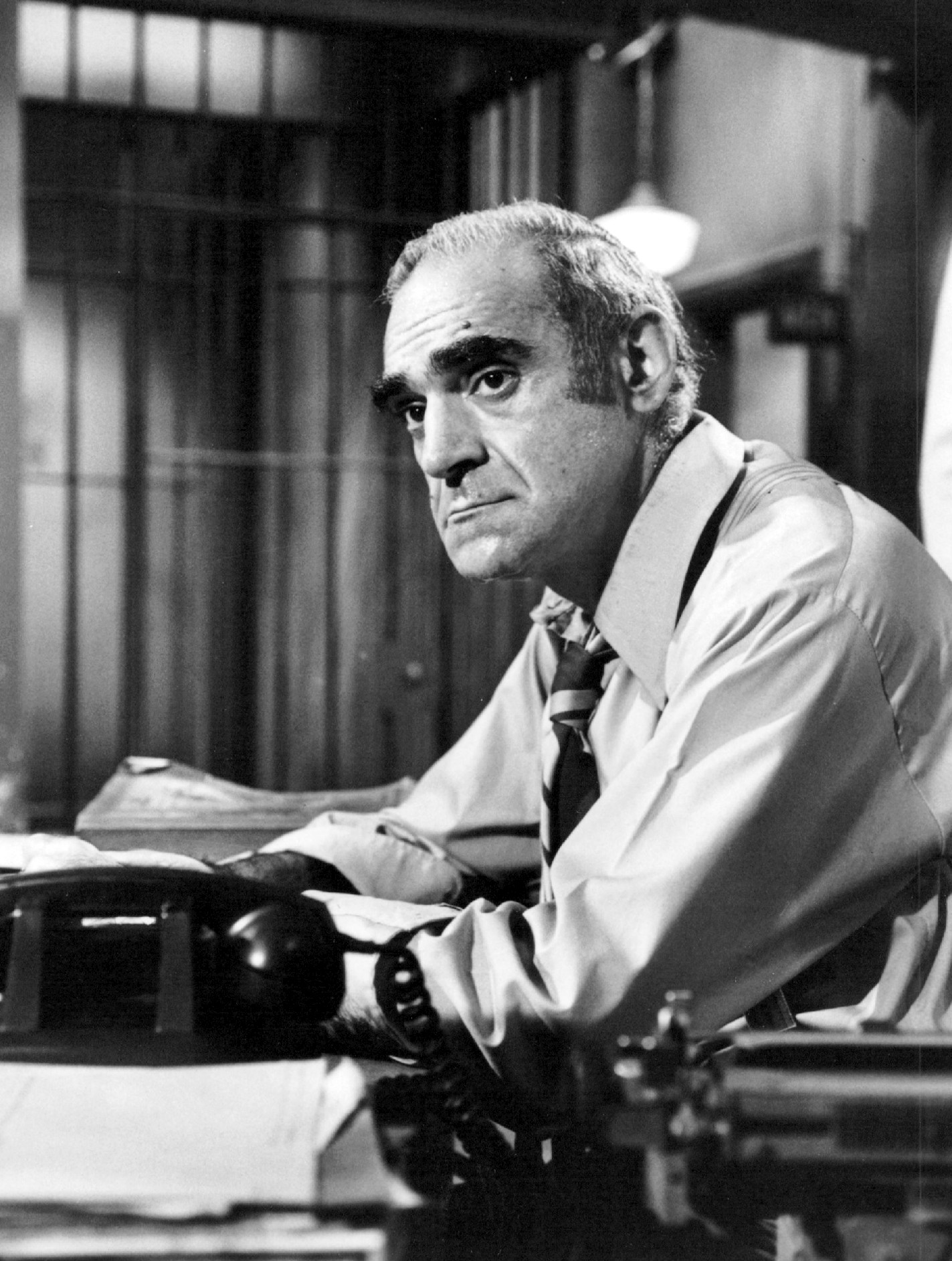
Abe Vigoda, seen here on Barney Miller in 1977, was mistakenly reported as dead many times before his actual death in 2016.

A death hoax is a deliberate report of someone's death that is later revealed to be untrue. In some cases, it might be because the person has intentionally faked death.

== Celebrities ==
"James Ross Clemens, a cousin of mine, was seriously ill two or three weeks ago in London, but is well now. The report of my illness grew out of his illness; the report of my death was an exaggeration."

— Mark Twain, 1897.

In the 21st century, death hoaxes about celebrities have been widely perpetuated via the Internet. However, they are not a new phenomenon: in 1945 following the death of Franklin Roosevelt, there were hoax reports of the deaths of Charlie Chaplin and Frank Sinatra, among other celebrities of the time. Possibly the most famous hoax of this type was the "Paul is dead" rumor, which claimed that Paul McCartney died in a car crash in 1966 and was replaced by a look-alike.

Hoaxes about the death of a celebrity increase in frequency when genuine celebrity deaths occur, such as when Ed McMahon, Farrah Fawcett, Michael Jackson, and Billy Mays died in rapid succession in June 2009, followed by Patrick Swayze a few months later. Paul Walker's death on 30 November 2013 sparked rumors of Eddie Murphy dying in a snowboarding accident.

In August 2018, Michael J. Fox was targeted due to his Parkinson's disease and his age. In June 2023, Jeremy Renner was falsely rumored to have died from his wounds from a snowplow incident in January. Teenage rapper Lil Tay and her older brother were falsely reported as dead on 9 August 2023, when her Instagram account was compromised. On 11 September 2023, country music singer Toby Keith was incorrectly reported dead because of his stomach cancer, before his actual death from the disease on 5 February 2024.

In February 2024, Indian model and actress Poonam Pandey staged a fake announcement of her death from cervical cancer as part of an awareness campaign. The hoax drew widespread criticism for being insensitive and manipulative, but also sparked a national conversation about the preventable disease.

In July 2026, a glitch in Google's search engine resulted in an erroneous report of Stevin "Blippi" John dying from a heart attack being spread across social media.

Other cases of celebrity death hoaxes fueled by the rise of social media include Bill Murray, Jon Bon Jovi, Gordon Lightfoot, Shah Rukh Khan, Eminem, Jerry Springer, Bill Nye, Jimmy Fallon, Joe Rogan, Queen Elizabeth II, William H. Macy, Harry Belafonte, Michael Schumacher, and Simon Cowell.

=== Politicians ===
On 8 January 1992, Headline News almost became the victim of a death hoax. A man phoned HLN claiming to be President George H. W. Bush's physician, alleging that Bush had died following an incident in Tokyo where he vomited and lost consciousness; however, before anchorman Don Harrison was about to report the news, executive producer Roger Bahre, who was off-camera, immediately yelled "No! Stop!" It was discovered that a CNN employee entered the information into a centralized computer, used by both CNN and Headline News teleprompters, and nearly got out on the air before it could be verified. The perpetrator of this hoax was identified as James Edward Smith from Idaho, who was questioned by the Secret Service and subsequently sent to a medical facility for psychiatric evaluation.

On 18 March 2015, a fake screenshot supposedly from the PMO's website reported the death of Lee Kuan Yew, first prime minister of Singapore. Lee was still alive at the time, but died on 23 March 2015 after being hospitalized, age 91. On 8 April 2015, a student who created the fake rumor was issued a warning by the Attorney-General of Singapore, after "careful consideration of all relevant factors".

On 22 November 2022, a fabricated screenshot of a CNN story with the headline "Donald Trump dead at 76" was posted on Instagram and Twitter. This caused posts falsely claiming that Trump had died to circulate on social media. The origin of the hoax was traced to comedian Tim Heidecker, who had one day earlier posted a tweet with the joking implication that Trump's death was being covered up.

A hoax letter reporting the death of former US president Jimmy Carter, age 99 and in hospice care, began circulating on social media on 23 July 2024. The creator of the letter said to Reuters that they were exasperated by news media reporting on Joe Biden's health, and had created the letter "to prove that many people on X often spread sensationalist news [without verifying] the source content". The letter contained numerous jokes, such as praising Carter for "selling the United States out to Panama" and referring to his wife Rosalynn as a "baddie" and "the original Brat". Senator Mike Lee (R-Utah) fell for the letter, offering thoughts and prayers to Carter's family. Carter died on 29 December, age 100.

== Death denial rumors ==
An opposite phenomenon is death denial rumors: claims that a person is alive, despite official announcements of death (i.e. death certificates, confirmations, etc.). Notable cases are Elvis Presley, Andy Kaufman, Tupac Shakur, Prince, Michael Jackson, XXXTentacion, and Oliver Tree. Another death denial rumor is that John F. Kennedy Jr. faked his death in the 1999 plane crash and went into hiding. This conspiracy theory was later spread by the QAnon movement, which also claimed that he would return to public life and be Donald Trump's running mate in the 2024 presidential election.

== See also ==
- List of prematurely reported obituaries
- Avril Lavigne replacement conspiracy theory
- Melania Trump replacement conspiracy theory
- Paul McCartney death conspiracy theory
