= Raphaël Castoriano =

- Education: Parsons School of Design, The New School
- Website: Kreemart.com

Raphaël Castoriano is an artist, art advisor and founder & creative director of Kreëmart.

== Early life and career ==
Castoriano grew up in Argentina, Peru, Brazil, France, Italy and the United States and graduated with BFAs from the Parsons School of Design and The New School in New York. He has been living and working in New York City since 1997.

== Kreëmart ==
In 2001, Castoriano served as one of the founders and the artistic director for The Museum of Sex. In 2009, Castoriano founded Kreëmart, a collaborative artistic entity that takes contemporary artists "out of their typical creative process by providing the medium of sugar as their ultimate provocation".

Through Kreëmart, Castoriano has collaborated with a number of artists, including Marina Abramović, Mickalene Thomas, Ryan McNamara, Maurizio Cattelan, Rirkrit Tiravanija, Vik Muniz, Kenny Scharf, Anselm Reyle, Mariko Mori, Richard Tuttle, and Debbie Harry. Kreëmart pairs artists with chefs like Daniel Boulud, Domique Ansel (inventor of Cronut), Pierre Hermé, Saint Ambroeous and Ladurée. Kreëmart's work has been presented in several museums and art fairs.

The Hebrew University (The Edmond and Lily Safra Brain Institute) commissioned Castoriano to create a Pastry Portrait for their 100th Anniversary Celebration, and he collaborated with video artist Tony Oursler and neuroscientist Prof. Idan Segev to make a Pastry Portrait of Tony Oursler.

Commissioned by Mastercard, the Taste of Priceless, is an exhibition curated by Raphael Castoriano and Kreemart, involving works by artists Monika Bravo, Daniel Lismore, Marilyn Minter, and Jennifer Rubell.

== Collaborators ==
- Marina Abramović
- Maurizio Cattelan
- Vik Muniz
- Kalup Linzy
- Anselm Reyle
- Richard Tuttle
- Tony Oursler
- Youssef Nabil
- Romina De Novellis
- Leandro Erlich
- Los Carpinteros
- Teresita Fernández
- Reza Farkhondeh
- Kenny Scharf
- Regina Silveria
- Mickalene Thomas
- Rirkrit Tiravanija
- Monika Bravo
- Jennifer Rubell
- Marilyn Minter
- Daniel Lismore
- Mariko Mori
