= 9/10: The Final Hours =

- movie poster
- Directed by: Erik Nelson
- Produced by: Amy Briamonte
- Cinematography: Thomas Kaufman
- Edited by: Robert Erikson; Paul Marengo; Jason Spencer
- Music by: Mark Leggett
- Production companies: Creative Differences Productions, Inc. National Geographic
- Distributed by: NGC Network US; National Geographic
- Release date: 2014
- Running time: 89 minutes
- Country: United States
- Language: English

9/10: The Final Hours is a 2014 American-Canadian documentary film featuring interviews with various people describing their personal experiences on the day of September 10, 2001 ("9/10"), prior to the September 11 attacks that destroyed the Twin Towers of the World Trade Center. Directed by Erik Nelson and produced by Amy Briamonte, the documentary was released in 2014 on Amazon Prime Video and YouTube. The documentary received positive critical reviews in spite of little to no promotion, and was aired on National Geographic's various television channels. The musical soundtrack score was composed by Mark Leggett and uploaded separately to his own music website.

== Plot ==
9/10: The Final Hours interviews two employees of the Windows on the World restaurant within the top of 1 World Trade Center, WPIX anchorman Jim Watkins, a Canadian photographer and tourist who took pictures and has one of the last admittance tickets to the World Trade Center's observation deck, Cantor Fitzgerald CEO Howard Lutnick, artists Wolfgang Staehle and Monika Bravo, dancer Valda Setterfield, and many others who were there the day before the September 11th attacks. Also featured were photos taken by Estonian immigrant Konstantin Petrov, who worked as a night shift electrician at Windows on the World, and took many photos from his workplace that he uploaded to his account on Fotki (which was founded by a friend of his). He barely escaped the terror attacks, leaving the building just after his shift ended at 8:00 a.m. The documentary also presents images from the 9/11 Memorial Museum and the "Tribute in Light", a memorial made from the remaining foundations of the Twin Towers that casts a foggy turquoise light into the sky in a vertical column resembling the space where both towers once stood.

== Reception ==
9/10: The Final Hours received positive reviews from critics. Alex Ashlock of WBUR called the documentary "compelling, if at times difficult to watch, because even though it's about the day before the attacks on September 11, 2001, what happened that morning shadows everything the people in the film say." The Arab Times noted the surprising revelations in the documentary, saying, "some seemingly everyday decisions saved lives, while others ultimately cost them."

The documentary was uploaded to YouTube by cinematographer Thomas Kaufman, as well as sold on Amazon Prime in the US, and also aired on National Geographic's TV channels.
