= BlueAnon =

Slogan in the United States

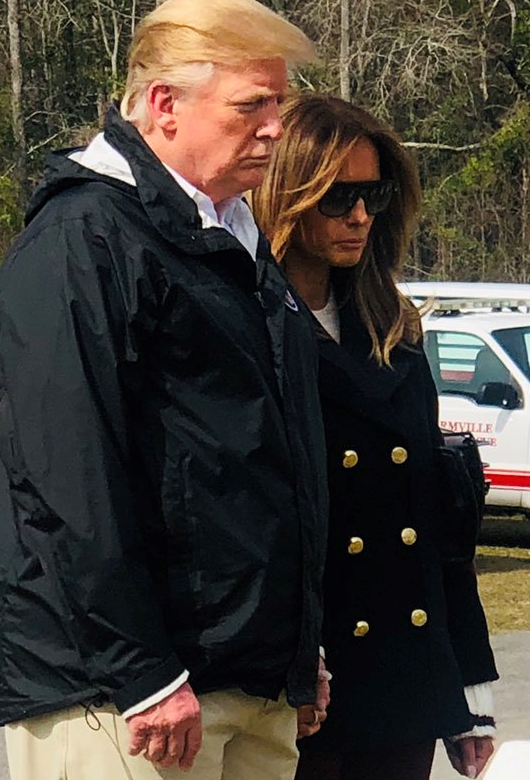
Donald and Melania Trump in Alabama, March 2018. The TV show The View had a segment on "a surge of internet chatter about the former fashion model's Alabama appearance under the #fakeMelania hashtag", relaying the conspiracy theory that the woman pictured here was not the real Melania.

"BlueAnon" is a term used to describe conspiratorial thinking among liberals in the United States. A portmanteau of blue (the color of the Democratic Party) and QAnon, it was first used by conservative commentators to mock claims of Russian interference in the 2016 elections. It was later used more broadly to describe conspiracy theories and denialism propagated by supporters of Joe Biden and the Democratic Party.

Theories attributed in media reports to BlueAnon thinking include the theory that the attempted assassination of Trump in July 2024 was a false flag staged by Trump himself, the theory that Ivana Trump was secretly cremated by Trump so that incriminating documents could be hidden in her coffin, and the theory that Melania Trump was replaced by a body double during the 2024 presidential campaign, among others.

== Origin, etymology, and analysis ==
According to the Columbia Journalism Review and The Washington Post, the term "BlueAnon" was first coined sometime during or after 2021 and gained prominence in 2024; On the Media's Anna Merlan cites a definitive 2016 origination date. According to the Columbia Journalism Review citing The Washington Post, the term was "first used by conservative commentators to mock the claim that Russia interfered in the 2016 election" and was later invoked by "some liberals" to "refer to a range of outlandish conspiracy theories about shadowy forces". The Post's Taylor Lorenz separately explained the term has been "used by people across the political spectrum to describe particularly outlandish conspiracies and denialism from [Joe] Biden supporters".

The name appears to be derived from media coverage surrounding these theories, in reference to the QAnon right-wing conspiracy theory and the color blue, which has been associated with the Democratic Party in the 21st century. According to The Washington Post's Philip Bump, the analogy relied more on rhetorical whataboutism than substantive similarity as QAnon was rooted in elaborate long-running false narratives, while "BlueAnon" described scattered and short-lived speculation. Bump argued the comparison exaggerates left-wing susceptibility to conspiracy theories and obscures the distinct scale, structure, and political impact of QAnon. He concluded that the main resemblance between the terms is phonetic rather than substantive.

== Conspiracy theories ==
=== Attempted assassination false flag ===
Some BlueAnon theorists alleged that the attempted assassination of Trump in Pennsylvania in July 2024 was a false flag staged by Trump himself. Snopes examined and discredited viral photos alleging to show Trump plotting with gunman Thomas Matthew Crooks, as well as claims that Trump was injured by glass instead of shrapnel. PolitiFact debunked claims that blood which appeared to be coming from Trump's ear following the assassination attempt was faked with a blood pill. Reuters analyzed viral photos from the 2024 Republican National Convention that purport to show Trump wearing a bandage on the ear opposite the one that was shot in the attack and determined the images were doctored.

=== Starlink election rigging ===
Morgan J. Freeman
(@mjfree)
tweeted:

If Trump & Elon’s “little secret” was to use Starlink in swing states to tally the votes & rig the election - an investigation & hand recount is crucial. Now.

November 10, 2024

Other BlueAnon theorists believe Trump rigged the 2024 U.S. presidential election by conspiring with Elon Musk to use Starlink satellites to change vote tabulation data and then orbitally detonated some of the satellites to erase evidence of the plot. The claims were investigated and discredited by the Associated Press. They were rejected by CISA director Jen Easterly. Deutsche Welle concluded "there is no evidence that Trump has cheated in this election".

=== Ivana Trump coffin concealment ===
Another BlueAnon theory posits that Ivana Trump was secretly cremated by Trump to free room in her coffin to hide self-incriminating documents so as to conceal them from discovery by investigators. The conspiracy theory began circulating almost immediately after Ivana Trump's 2022 death and multiple people demanded the FBI exhume Trump's grave to search the coffin for the allegedly hidden documents. Snopes rated the theory "unfounded".

=== Donald Trump illness and death hoax ===
During Trump's second presidency, he was seen on multiple occasions with bruised hands and swollen ankles, and in July 2025 was diagnosed with chronic venous insufficiency, a minor age-related illness. Rumors spread that Trump was critically ill and suffering from various illnesses, including congestive heart failure, which culminated in August 2025, when a viral post claimed that Trump had six to eight months to live due to CHF, a claim Snopes said was "unfounded and not based on any hands-on diagnosis by any physician." Later that month, after an absence from the public eye, claims of Trump's death went viral and were spread by Illinois Governor JB Pritzker. These claims were debunked after Trump was seen golfing and posted on Truth Social.

=== Other conspiracy theories ===
Other beliefs subscribed to by some BlueAnon theorists include that a cabal of Silicon Valley executives is plotting to overthrow Trump and replace him with JD Vance; a body double of Melania Trump was used during campaign appearances in the 2024 U.S. presidential election; Biden had either been drugged or afflicted with Havana syndrome by Russian secret agents during the 2024 Biden–Trump presidential debate; and that Vance changed his name due to being a pedophile.

== Propagation and influence ==
"... possibility -- which feels horrific and alien and absurd in America, but is quite common globally -- is that this ‘shooting’ was encouraged and maybe even staged so Trump could get the photos and benefit from the backlash. This is a classic Russian tactic..."

— Email from Dmitri Mehlhorn, July 13, 2024,

Following the attempted assassination of Trump in Pennsylvania in July 2024, Dmitri Mehlhorn distributed an email to colleagues – which the Columbia Journalism Review associated with BlueAnon theorizing – that suggested that Trump "encouraged and maybe even staged [the assassination attempt] so Trump could get the photos and benefit from the backlash." Numerous social media posts to X similarly suggested the assassination attempt had been staged. A July 2024 poll by Morning Consult found that approximately one-third of voters supporting the Biden 2024 presidential campaign believed the assassination attempt was staged.

In October 2024, the Lincoln Project produced a video advertisement promoting the theory that Silicon Valley executives were plotting to replace Trump with Vance as president of the United States, should Trump be elected to that office. In November 2024, in the 12 hours after Trump's declared victory in the 2024 U.S. presidential election, posts to X (formerly Twitter) alleging electoral irregularities and questioning the disparity in vote totals between the 2020 and 2024 presidential elections – which Wired associated with BlueAnon theorizing – peaked at 94,000 per hour. It included one post by John Pavlovitz that received more than five million views. Another post, seen more than 17 million times, alleged Trump "cheated this whole time". On Threads, Wayne Madsen posted "I'm beginning to believe our election was massively hacked", while TikTok saw a surge of posts by astrologers alleging election irregularities.

=== Propagation on Threads ===
Percentage of voter groups who said "suggestions that the shooting was staged ... were credible", as reported by a July 2024 Morning Consult survey

According to Canadian political scientist Kawser Ahmed, Meta's social media network Threads is a "hotbed for BlueAnon conspiratorial content". Taylor Lorenz also commented that BlueAnon conspiracy theorizing was establishing itself on Threads.

== Blue MAGA ==
Blue MAGA is a pejorative term used by both moderate and leftist factions of the Democratic party to describe the other faction. Moderates began using the term to describe leftists' insurgent support of Bernie Sanders in a cult-like manner similar to supporters of Republican President Donald Trump (known for the slogan "Make America Great Again", MAGA). Leftists have used the term to compare moderate members of the Democratic Party politicians, such as supporters of Presidents Joe Biden and Barack Obama, 2024 Democratic nominee and former vice-president Kamala Harris, or Hillary Clinton to supporters of the MAGA movement. The term is used to criticize a perceived cult-like dedication to these individuals or the Democratic Party in general, conspiracy theories to explain opposition to Biden's 2024 presidential campaign, and dismissal of news or polling that does not reflect well on them. Liberal social media users claim the term is a false equivalence.

Ro Khanna has half jokingly referred to his approach as Blue MAGA. Lindy Li was also described as Blue MAGA.

== Coverage by media ==
BlueAnon as a sociological and social media phenomenon has been the subject of reporting by Columbia Journalism Review ("The Trump assassination attempt, 'BlueAnon,' and the X factor"), by The New Statesman ("The alarming rise of BlueAnon"), by WJLA-TV ("'BlueAnon' theories pop up as some on Left attempt to explain Trump's win"), by Rolling Stone ("BlueAnon Conspiracy Theories Explode"), by France 24 ("'BlueAnon' conspiracy theorists spread viral voter fraud claims after Trump victory"), by The Washington Post ("‘BlueAnon’ conspiracy theories flood social media after Trump rally shooting"), and by other media. In 2024, HarperCollins published David Harsanyi's book The Rise of BlueAnon.

== See also ==
- Confirmation bias
- Cult of personality
- Dark Woke
- Palmer Report
- Political polarization in the United States
- "Vast right-wing conspiracy"
