= Cultural depictions of Ivanka Trump =

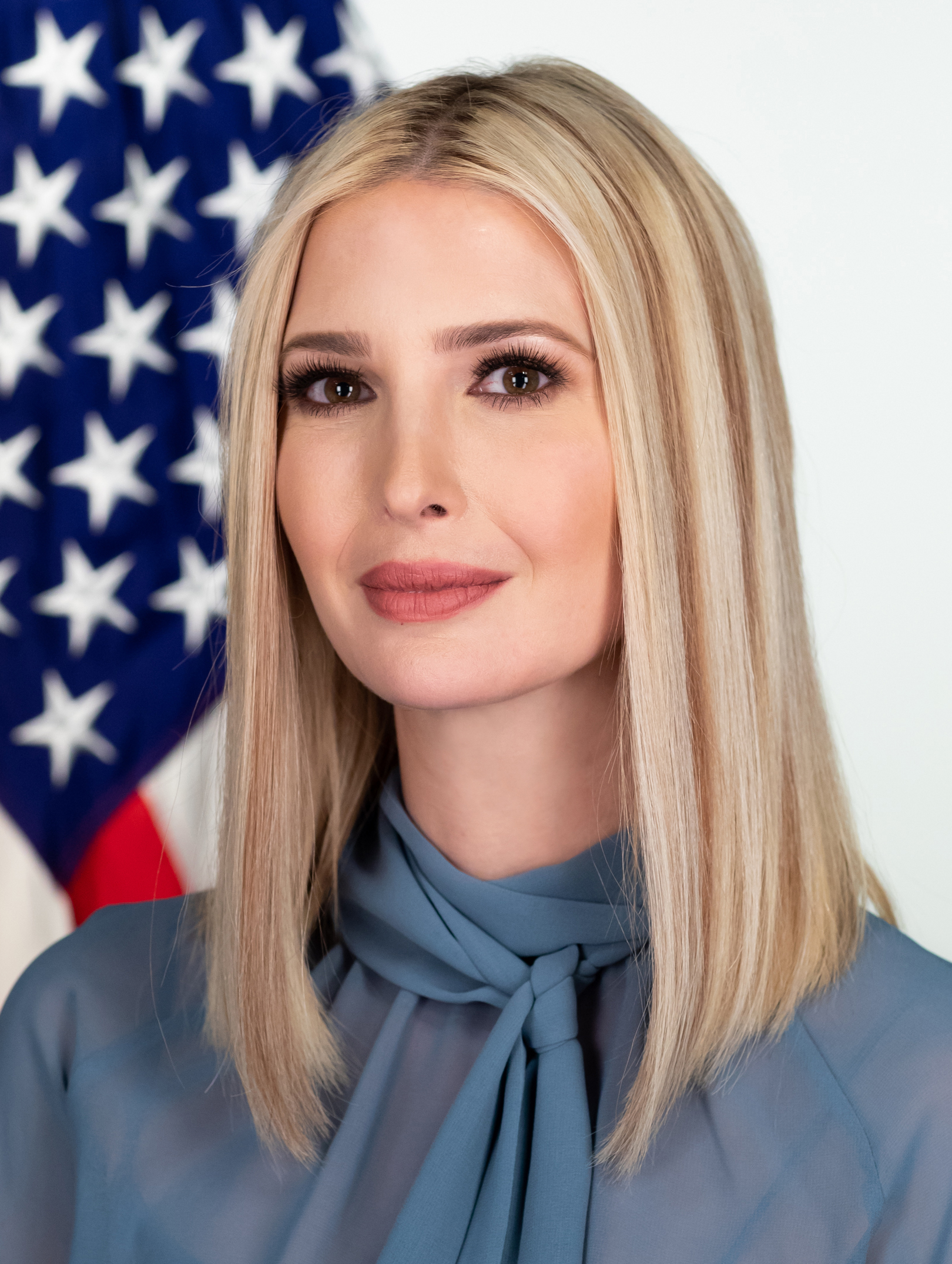
Ivanka Trump in 2020

Ivanka Trump has been portrayed many times in popular culture in recent years.

== Drag ==
Men dressed as Trump have attended protests against U.S. President Donald Trump. Mitchell Sunderland of Vice Media's Broadly has commented on the limited impersonating of Ivanka Trump by drag queens, compared to other women in Donald Trump's administration.

In 2017, the comedy video website Funny or Die released a sketch with Trump played by a drag queen.

== Television ==
On Saturday Night Live, Ivanka Trump has been portrayed by cast member Vanessa Bayer, as well as guest hosts Margot Robbie, Emily Blunt, and Scarlett Johansson. Johansson's episode featured an advertisement for a fake Trump perfume called "Complicit". Former cast member Maya Rudolph, who played Trump on the show in 2005, impersonated her again on Late Night with Seth Meyers in 2017.

Stephanie March portrayed her on The President Show (2017) while Emily Lynne portrayed her on Our Cartoon President (2018). A 2018 episode of Last Week Tonight with John Oliver featured a graphic of the first daughter as the mother from the American horror film Get Out (2017).

In the eleventh season of RuPaul's Drag Race, a satirical version of her was portrayed by drag queen Mercedes Iman Diamond in an episode called "Trump: The Rusical".

Trump served as a boardroom advisor and judge on "The Apprentice," starting from the show's fifth season in 2006.

She made a guest appearance on "Project Runway" during its third season in 2006. She served as a guest judge on the popular fashion design competition show, where she evaluated the contestants' designs. Her involvement in the fashion industry, including her own fashion line, lent credibility to her role as a judge on the show.

== Visual arts ==
Madame Tussauds has a wax sculpture of Trump.

Jennifer Rubell's art exhibition Ivanka Vacuuming featured a model resembling Trump vacuuming crumbs thrown by spectators. The exhibition was sponsored by CulturalDC and hosted by Washington, D.C.'s Flashpoint Gallery in February 2019. Ivanka Trump herself tweeted regarding the exhibit, "Women can choose to knock each other down or build each other up. I choose the latter." Donald Trump Jr. tweeted, "Sad, but not surprising to watch self professed 'feminists' launching sexist attacks against @IvankaTrump. In their crazed world, sexism is OK if hurts their political enemies. That's ok, they can go put on their stupid hats & she’ll get back to actually fighting for women."

Trump was portrayed by artist Richard Prince in his art series New Portraits, which featured a portrait of a screenshot from her Instagram feed.

== See also ==
- Cultural depictions of Melania Trump
- Saturday Night Live parodies of Donald Trump
