= Ivanka Vacuuming =

2019 performance art by Jennifer Rubell

- Short clip of the performance
- Artist: Jennifer Rubell
- Year: 2019
- Type: Performance art
- Location: Flashpoint Gallery; Washington D.C., U.S.

Ivanka Vacuuming was a piece of livestreamed performance art by American artist Jennifer Rubell which showed an Ivanka Trump look-alike vacuuming crumbs off a carpet. The piece appeared at the Flashpoint Gallery in Washington D.C. beginning on February 1, 2019, and ran through February 17. It was sponsored by CulturalDC. The piece was interactive, as "visitors ... are invited to throw crumbs at an Ivanka lookalike performer who's cordoned off in a separate, pink carpeted area, as she repeatedly vacuums—in heels, no less—every night for two live-streamed hours".

== Description ==
An Ivanka Trump impersonator vacuumed up crumbs thrown by onlookers onto the pink carpet. The actress stayed within the three-walled room, continually vacuuming in two-hour stints. The walls of the room were also pink. Rubell stated the piece was "inspired by a figure whose public persona incorporates an almost comically wide range of feminine identities: daughter, wife, mother, sister, model, working woman, blonde".

== Reception and response ==
W Magazine stated, "Needless to say, reactions have been mixed". The National stated, "Politics aside, the vacuuming Ivanka Trump is a distasteful, sexist parody".

Molly Jong-Fast of The Forward stated, "That Ivanka Trump art exhibit is more real than she is". Hyperallergic stated, "It's hard to say what is most disorienting about the interactive performance piece... the schadenfreude it instigates, the somewhat anachronistic feminist button-mashing, or the ridiculous notion that Ivanka Trump has ever used a vacuum cleaner in her entire life".

Art critic Paddy Johnson was critical of the piece, writing in a column for CNN, "Art doesn't need to serve up fixed meaning, but in combination with other more trite aspects of the work, the piece falls apart. The obvious symbolism that the color pink and a vacuum equals women, for example, prompts derision, not intellectual curiosity."

The Atlantic stated "while Ivanka Vacuuming appears to be making a case about complicity by incorporating the viewer, the message is muddled".

=== Trump family ===
Ivanka Trump tweeted, "Women can choose to knock each other down or build each other up. I choose the latter." USA Today characterized Ivanka's response as an "icy reaction". In response, Rubell invited Ivanka to see the piece first hand.

Donald Trump Jr. tweeted, "Sad, but not surprising to watch self professed 'feminists' launching sexist attacks against @IvankaTrump. In their crazed world, sexism is OK if hurts their political enemies."

Eric Trump stated, "These leftists called up a modeling agency, saying, 'You know what, I want to get a nice woman to come stand on a carpet, with a vacuum of all things, so that our people can throw food and crumbs to mimic a powerful woman who has done more for women than probably anyone in Washington, D.C. Think about that hypocrisy. They label themselves the quote, unquote [sic] party of women, yet they're throwing food, they're throwing garbage at a woman on a carpet holding a vacuum cleaner to mimic someone who really does care and who has fought so hard for women."

== See also ==
- 2019 in art
- Cultural depictions of Ivanka Trump
