= Yanis Marshall =

French dancer and choreographer

- Born: November 11, 1989 (age 36); Grasse, France
- Occupations: Dancer; choreographer

Yanis Marshall (born 11 November 1989) is a French dancer and choreographer. He was born in Grasse, France. He specializes in a style of dance choreography in which dancers of all genders wear high-heeled shoes.

== Career ==
In 2014, he auditioned for Britain's Got Talent with two backup male dancers and ended up becoming a finalist. Marshall also has spent time working as a coach and choreographer on Dancing with the Stars and Ukraine's version of So You Think You Can Dance. He is also the choreographer for Cirque du Soleil's Las Vegas Zumanity show.

In 2018, he appeared as the dancing Deadpool in Céline Dion's video "Ashes", while Ryan Reynolds appeared as Deadpool in the speaking part.

In 2019, he appeared in the fourth episode of RuPaul's Drag Race Season 11 "Trump: The Rusical".

In 2022, he appeared in the fifth episode of Season 1 of Drag Race France.

In 2022, he became dance teacher in the 10th season of French TV show Star Academy (France)

== Personal life ==
Marshall is openly gay and has spoken about the role dancing plays in the coming out of people.
