= Trump: The Rusical =

- RuPaul's Drag Race episode
- Episode no.: Season 11; Episode 4
- Original air date: March 21, 2019

Guest appearances
- Joel McHale (guest judge); Tiffany Pollard (guest judge); Rachel Maddow; Yanis Marshall; Ginger Minj as Donald Trump

Episode chronology
| ← Previous "Diva Worship" | Next → "Monster Ball" |
- RuPaul's Drag Race season 11

"Trump: The Rusical" is the fourth episode of the eleventh season of the American reality competition television series RuPaul's Drag Race, which aired on VH1 on March 21, 2019. The episode has contestants deliver Rachel Maddow impressions for the mini challenge, and perform a musical parody of Grease about Donald Trump and the women in his life and cabinet for the main challenge. The musical features choreography by Yanis Marshall, and sees Donald Trump portrayed by former contestant Ginger Minj.

Maddow appears as a special guest; Joel McHale and Tiffany Pollard are guest judges, alongside regular panelists RuPaul, Michelle Visage, and Ross Mathews. The episode received two awards from four nominations at the 71st Primetime Emmy Awards.

== Episode ==
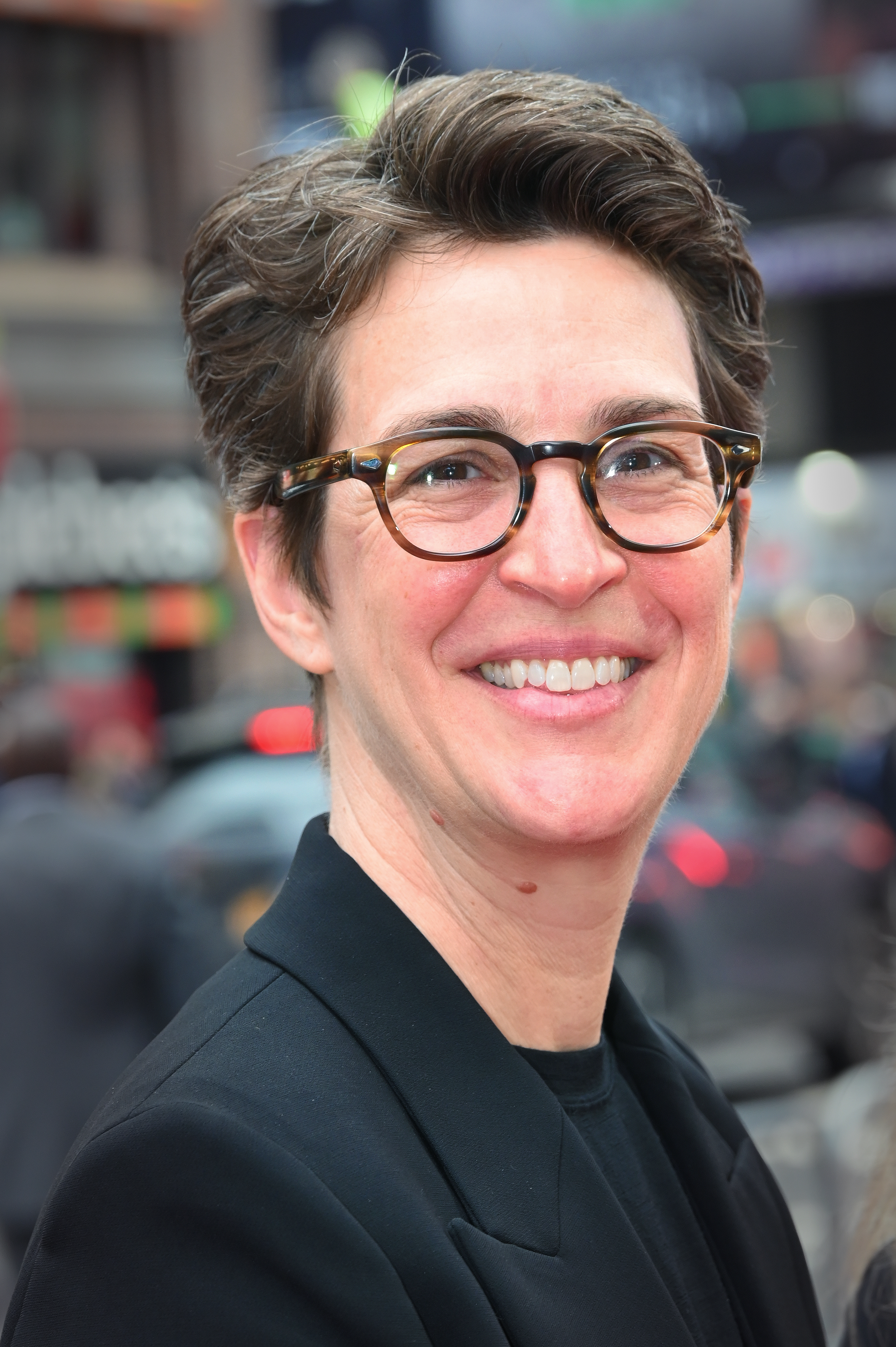
For the mini-challenge, contestants deliver the news while impersonating Rachel Maddow (pictured in 2025), who makes a guest appearance.

The contestants return to the Werk Room after Honey Davenport's elimination from the competition. On a new day, RuPaul greets the contestants and introduces the mini-challenge ("Why You Maddow, Tho?"), which tasks contestants with getting into "quick drag" and delivering the news while impersonating Rachel Maddow, RuPaul's favorite news presenter. Maddow appears as a special guest and helps introduce the mini-challenge. Contestants read fictional news from a teleprompter, some more successfully than others. RuPaul names Scarlet Envy the winner.

RuPaul reveals the main challenge, which tasks contestants with performing in a lip-sync musical parody of Grease (1971) about U.S. President Donald Trump and the women in his life and cabinet, called Trump: The Rusical. The Rusical features choreography by Yanis Marshall, who provides instruction during the episode. As the winner of the mini-challenge, Scarlet Envy assigns the following roles:

- A'keria Davenport as Stormy Daniels
- Ariel Versace as Shandy (based on Sandy from Grease)
- Brooke Lynn Hytes as Ivana Trump
- Mercedes Iman Diamond as Ivanka Trump
- Nina West as Sarah Sanders
- Plastique Tiara as Melania Trump
- Ra'Jah O'Hara as Omarosa Manigault Newman
- Scarlet Envy as Betsy DeVos
- Shuga Cain as Hillary Clinton
- Silky Nutmeg Ganache as Oprah Winfrey
- Vanessa Vanjie Mateo as Rosie O'Donnell
- Yvie Oddly as Kellyanne Conway

During preparations for the main challenge, Yvie Oddly reveals she has Ehlers–Danlos syndrome, type 3, a connective tissue disease, Nina West describes being harassed during college in the wake of the murder of Matthew Shepard, and Mercedes Iman Diamond (the first Muslim contestant on the show) addresses Islamophobia and explains her previous reluctance to discuss her religion on the show. Silky Nutmeg Ganache also explains she is a registered Republican because of party gerrymandering and "gentrification and movement of the districts". She explains, "It's very important that people realize that if you want to stop that within the political process, get smarter than them. Register as a Republican, and they'll have to redo everything."

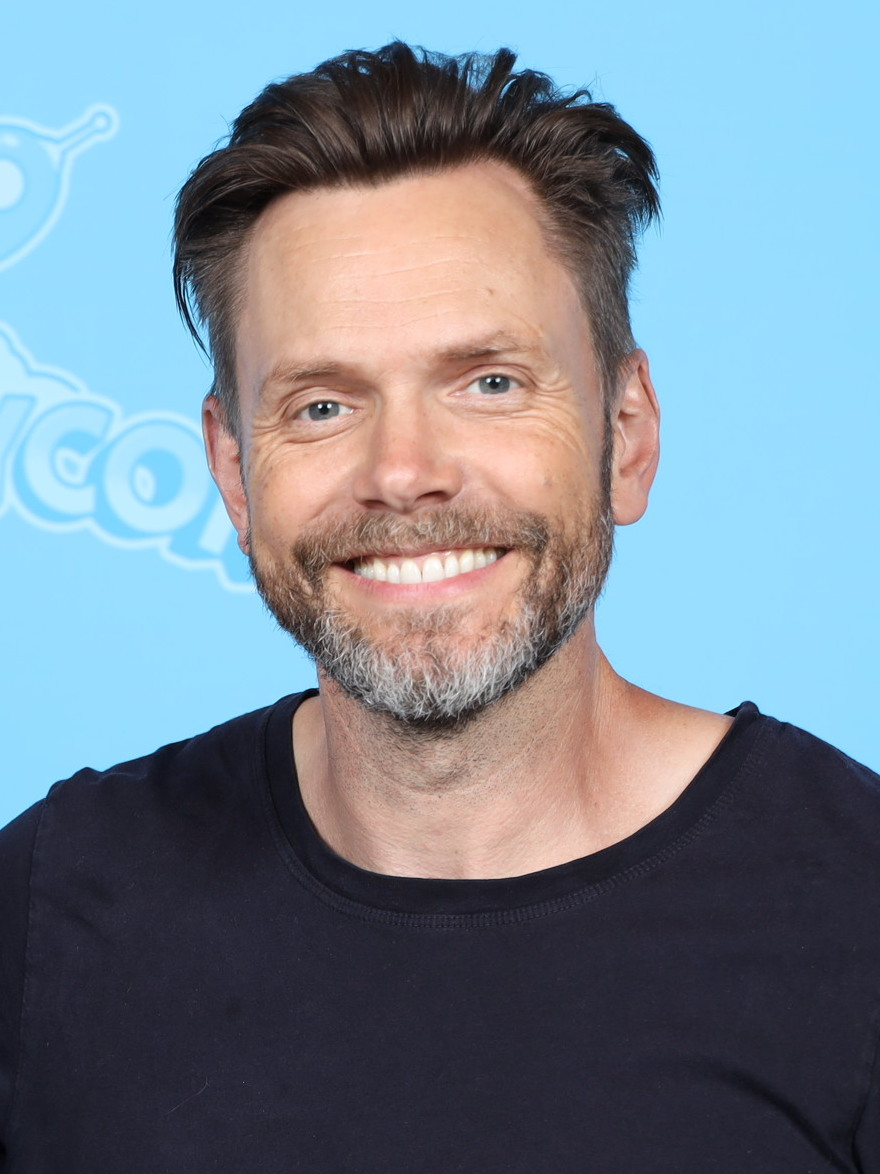
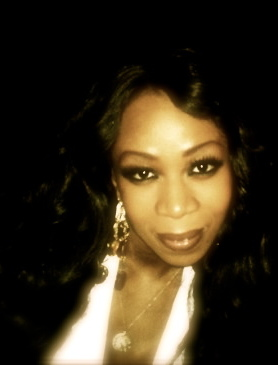
Joel McHale (left, pictured in 2023) and Tiffany Pollard (right) are guest judges.

The musical features former contestant Ginger Minj as Donald Trump. Ross Mathews also participates by interjecting a line from the judges panel at Ra'Jah O'Hara as Newman; Mathews and Newman competed on the first season of Celebrity Big Brother, a spin-off of the American reality television series Big Brother. RuPaul welcomes fellow panelists, including guest judges Joel McHale and Tiffany Pollard. RuPaul then reveals the theme for the runway: "Orange Alert".

Scarlet Envy, Nina West, Ariel Versace, Plastique Tiara, Shuga Cain, and A'Keria C. Davenport are declared safe. RuPaul tells Scarlet Envy she did a good job casting for the musical. Yvie Oddly, Silky Nutmeg Ganache, and Brooke Lynn Hytes receive positive feedback from the judges, while Ra'Jah O'Hara, Mercedes Iman Diamond, and Vanessa Vanjie Mateo receive negative critiques for their lack of performance in the musical. RuPaul names Silky Nutmeg Ganache the winner of the challenge. Mercedes Iman Diamond and Ra'Jah O'Hara are deemed the bottom two and lip-sync battle to James Brown's "Living in America". RuPaul declares Ra'Jah O'Hara the winner of the lip sync battle, eliminating Mercedes Iman Diamond from the competition. Mercedes Iman Diamond ululates as she exits the stage.

== Production ==
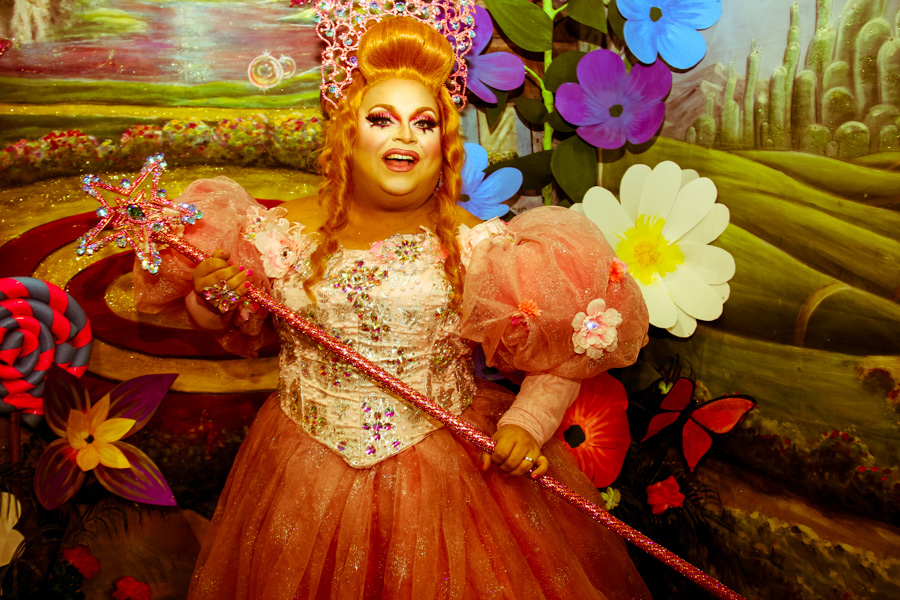
In the musical, Donald Trump is portrayed by former contestant Ginger Minj (pictured in 2018).

The episode originally aired on March 21, 2019.

Ginger Minj had competed on the seventh season of Drag Race, and also competed on the second (2016) and sixth (2021) seasons of the spin-off series RuPaul's Drag Race All Stars.

=== Fashion ===
For the fashion show, most contestants wear orange-colored outfits. Yvie Oddle wears a citrus- and clown-inspired outfit. Plastique Tiara has a dress and corset. Ra'Jah O'Hara has a catsuit, chaps, and a pixie cut. Nina West's outfit is inspired by Hello Dolly to commemorate Barbra Streisand. Scarlet Envy's orange outfit has a large bow and matching shoes. A'Keria C. Davenport presents a Nicki Minaj-inspired look and long orange hair. Silky Nutmeg Ganache wears a gown and she walks slowly across the stage. Ariel Versace has feathers in her hair. Mercedes Iman Diamond and Vanessa Vanjie Mateo both present showgirl-inspired looks with a large headpieces. Brook Lynn Hytes presents a futuristic look. Shuga Cain's look is a parody of Trump. Her outfit is blue and resembles a business suit, but her face is colored orange. She eats Cheetos while walking the runway, rubs some of the Cheetos residue on her face, and gestures a "pussy grab", alluding to the Donald Trump Access Hollywood tape.

== Reception ==
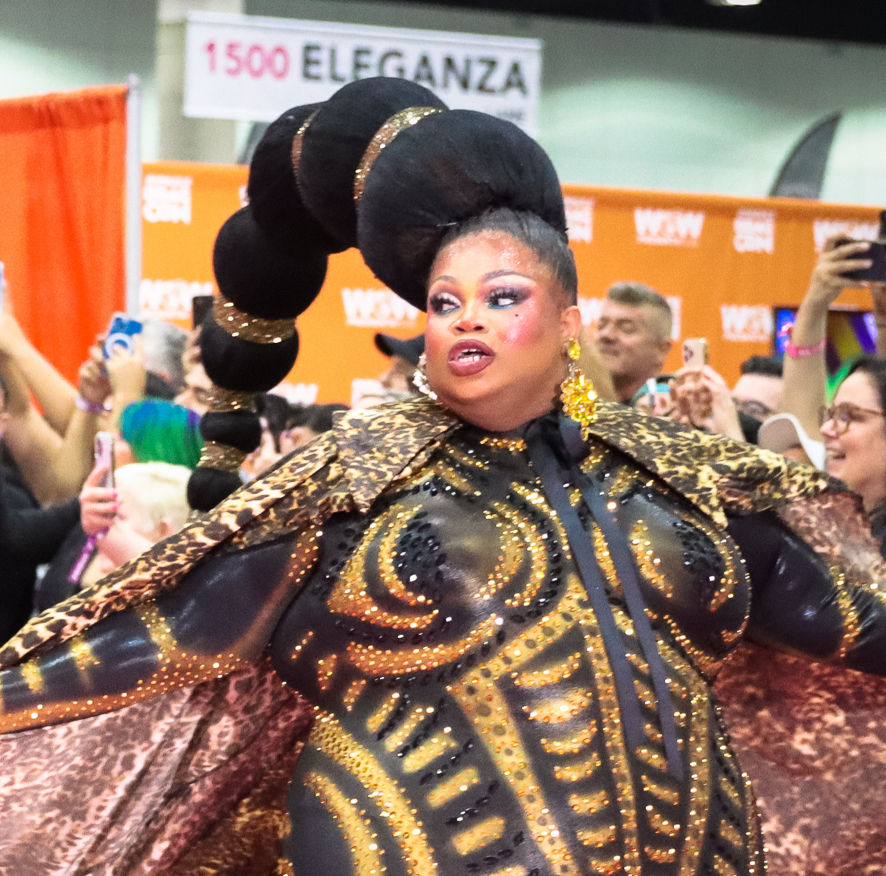
Silky Nutmeg Ganache (pictured at RuPaul's DragCon LA in 2023) wins the episode's main challenge.

Reception of the episode has been mixed. The A.V. Club gave the episode a rating of 'A'. Bianca Guzzo of IN Magazine praised the episode, writing: "Honestly, this was one of the most entertaining Rusicals in the show's history. It beautifully combined political humour, with the essence of Grease, and Ginger Minj as Trump… what else could you want?" Contrastingly, Joey Guerra of the Houston Chronicle said, "...aside from a Ginger Minj cameo as Trump, everyone else here is pretty BLAH. The musical just isn't very funny. It could have been some sort of bold political satire, but it falls flat and doesn't even go for easy jokes." PinkNews' Charlie Jones was similarly critical, who wrote, "Drag Race deserves its dues for setting up camp in the middle of a minefield, but let’s not pretend it didn't get maimed. It also, however, produced some of the most inspiring, and horrifying, personal narratives seen on reality TV."

Matt Rogers of Vulture said of the mini challenge, "I don't know whether Ru is an extra big fan of Maddow, or vice versa, but this challenge feels emblematic of what's off about the show right now. Maybe it's that it feels like it exists in an ultraprivileged bubble. Maybe it's the celebrity cameo that feels very 'we were able to do this and so we did, and we even focused a whole challenge around it.' Something specifically about Maddow's inclusion just made me roll my eyes."

When asked if her Trump look got her any flack in an interview of Entertainment Weekly, Shuga Cain replied, "Absolutely! It was surprising, because I've had a lot of people who are fans of the show who really grew to like me but, when I did the Trump look [they] were upset with me and said they were no longer going to watch the show. My mouth was on the floor. I found it difficult to understand how you can be a Drag Race fan and a fan of Donald Trump. It's a weird, eye-opening experience to realize how much Drag Race has touched different walks of life around the world."

=== Lip-sync ===
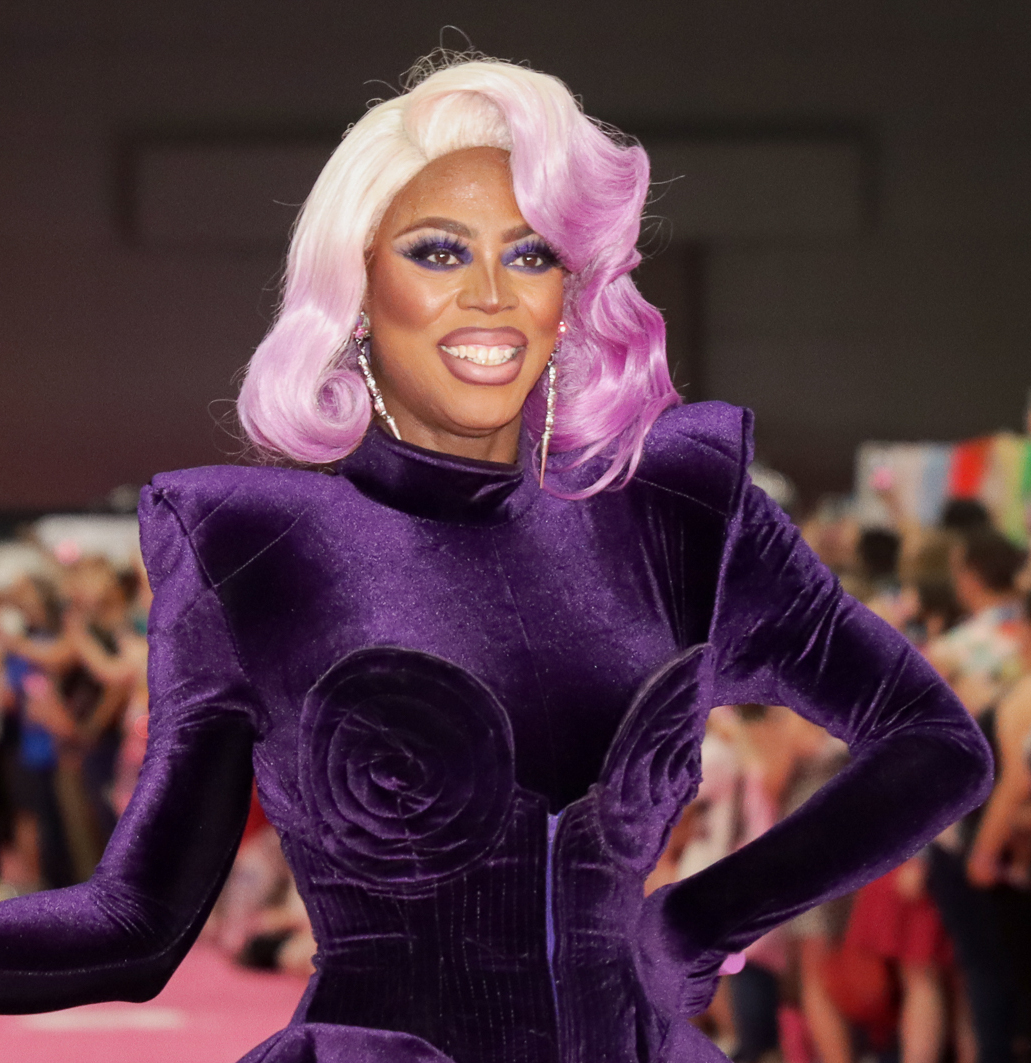
Ra'Jah O'Hara (pictured at RuPaul's DragCon LA in 2023) won the episode's lip-sync contest.

Emma Kelly of Metro called Ra'Jah O'Hara's lip-sync performance "epic" and wrote: "We very rarely get a male-performed song for a lip sync battle ... but it worked so well. Ra’Jah gave her best James Brown swag and had the tricky shout out lyrics on lock. That's how you do a lip sync, people." Sam Brooks ranked "Living in America" number 117 on The Spinoff's 2019 "definitive ranking" of all 162 lip-syncs on the show to date. In 2023, Sam Damshenas of Gay Times said Ra'Jah O'Hara "joined the prestigious 'fan-favourite' ranks thanks to her effortless lip-sync smackdowns". Damshehas said her performance of "Living in America" is "top tier".

== Awards ==
The episode received two awards from four nominations at the 71st Primetime Emmy Awards. Zaldy and Art Conn won in the Outstanding Costumes for a Variety, Nonfiction, or Reality Programming category and Hector Pocasangre won in the Outstanding Hairstyling for a Variety, Nonfiction or Reality Program category. Jake Kerber was nominated in the Outstanding Cinematography for a Reality Program category and Adam Burrell, Nicole Faulkner, Jen Fregozo, Natasha Marcelia, and Karen Mitchell were nominated in the Outstanding Makeup for a Variety, Nonfiction or Reality Program category.

== See also ==
- Cultural depictions of Ivanka Trump
- Islamophobia in the United States
- Public image of Melania Trump
