= Public image of Donald Trump =

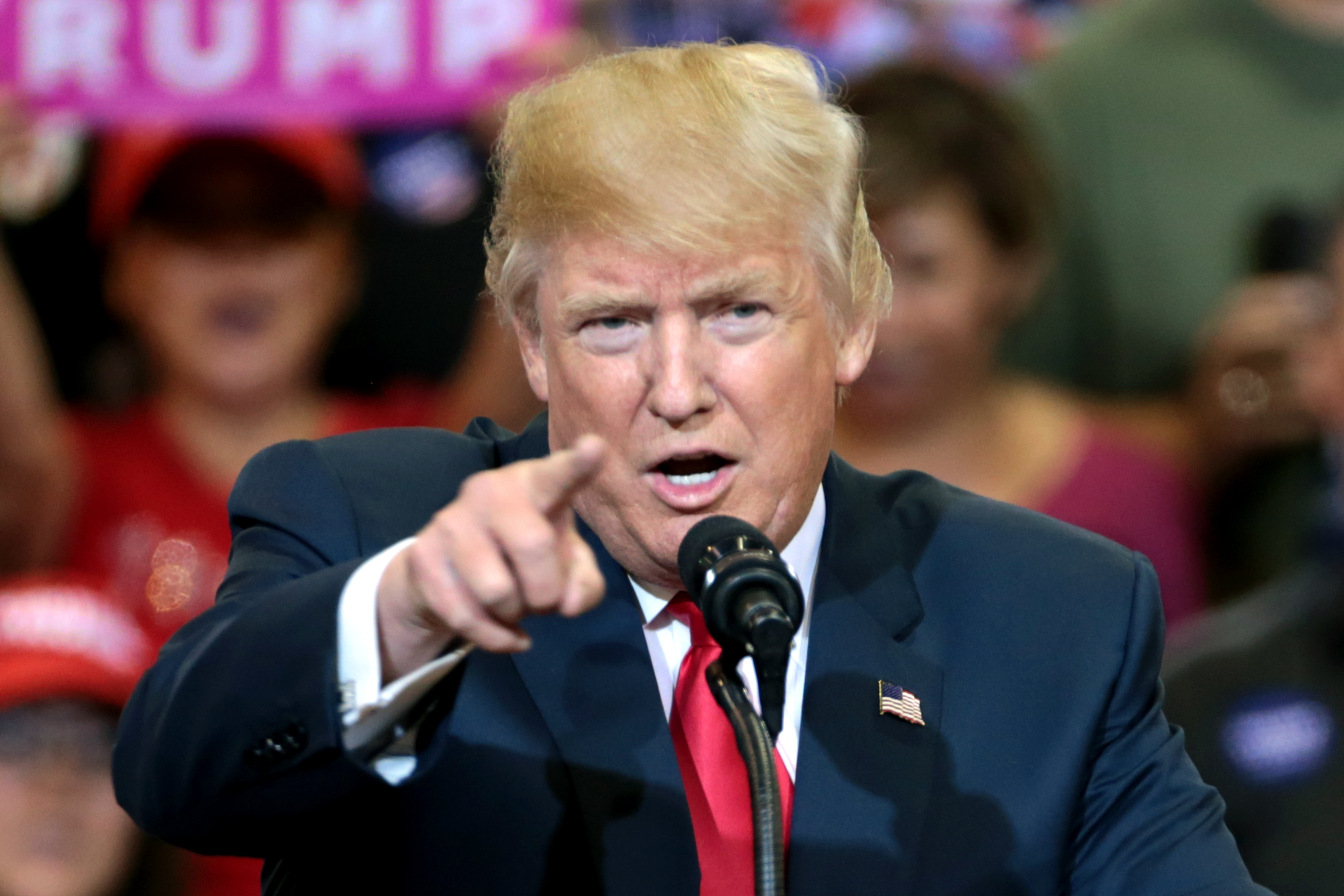
Donald Trump at a campaign rally in 2016

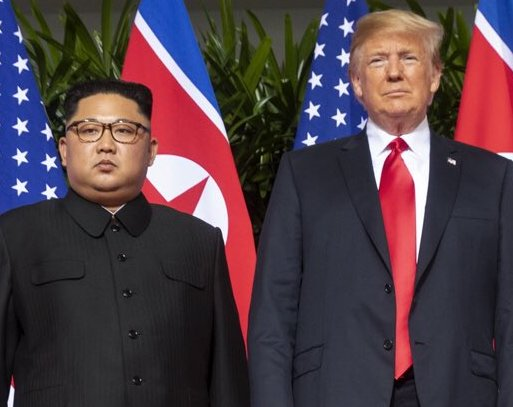
Donald Trump and Kim Jong Un in 2018. Trump stated that the number of cameras at the summit press line exceeded those at the Emmy Awards.

Donald Trump, the 45th and 47th president of the United States, has elicited highly polarized public perceptions about his performance as a head of state and largely controversial opinions about his temperament and personal conduct while in office.

Before entering politics, he was a businessman and television personality famous for his image as a real estate tycoon. Viewed as an authentic figure by many of his supporters, Trump was not initially viewed as a serious contender during the 2016 presidential campaign.

He has been named Time Person of the Year, Financial Times Person of the Year and Forbes second most powerful world leader in 2016, and Time Person of the Year again in 2024.

== Wealth and success ==
During his career as a businessman, Trump had an image of "the epitome of entrepreneurial success and glamour", which he advanced by hosting The Apprentice.

Trump's first book, The Art of the Deal, published in 1987, was a New York Times Best Seller. According to The New Yorker, "The book expanded Trump's renown far beyond New York City, making him an emblem of the successful tycoon." The book features an image Trump has promoted as a self-made man. This image of Trump as a billionaire self-made man supported his populist appeal in the 2016 election and during his first presidency.

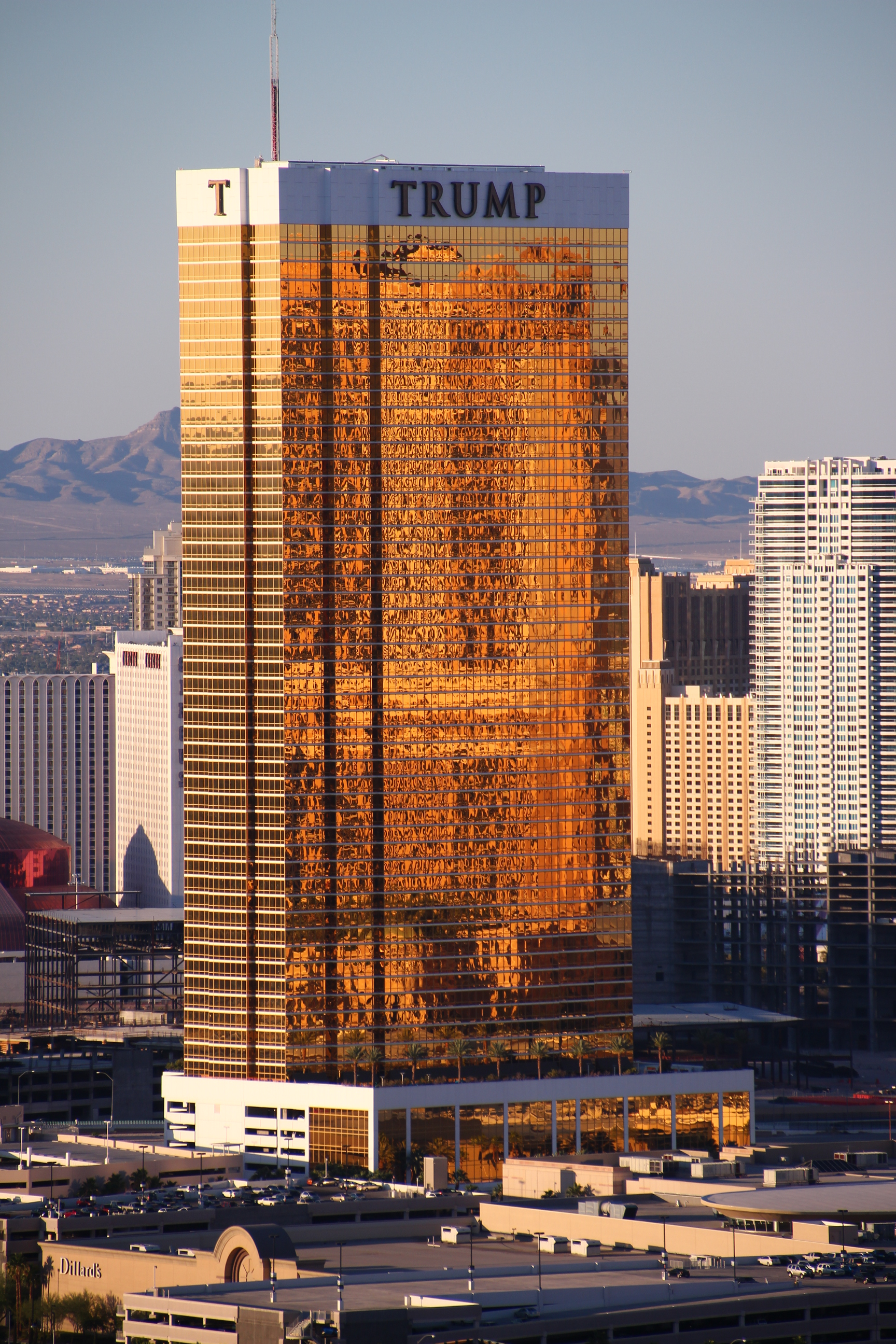
Trump International Hotel Las Vegas with gold-infused glass

== Personal image ==
=== Appearance ===
Tanned face, hairstyle, thumbs up and pouted lips are consistent elements of Trump's appearance that are recognizable and make up an "iconic" imagery.

In 2004, the Chicago Tribune wrote that Trump is "known for his gaudy casinos and unusual mane of copper hair".

His hair has been subject to speculation; during his 2016 presidential campaign, it was the subject of much public discussion, wherein it was asserted to be a toupée or comb over. Hair always is combed to cover the top of his left ear that protrudes more than the right ear. In a 2011 interview, Trump said, "I get a lot of credit for comb-overs. But it's not really a comb-over. It's sort of a little bit forward and back. I've combed it the same way for years. Same thing, every time."

In public appearances, Trump typically wears custom-made suits—described as boxy—designed by Italian fashion house Brioni and tailor Martin Greenfield, with large red ties, tied in a Windsor knot. At times, he has also worn bulky shoulder pads underneath his suits. His fashion has been criticized, such as being called "stuck in the 1980s" by Robin Givhan and designer Tom Ford describing Trump's fashion as "not sartorially elegant".

=== Temperament and personality ===
As of 2017, Trump's "unique personal style, brashness and disregard for conventional political norms and discourse" gained him attention and detractors, according to Gallup. Among detractors, perceptions of his temperament, arrogance and a tendency to act contrary to the expectations of presidents were disapproved of. As of 2023, critics perceived Trump to be vulgar and self-obsessed. After his temperament and mental fitness were subject to public debate, Trump responded by saying that he is a "very stable genius". Americans have mostly disapproved of Trump's temperament and personal conduct in office. This can be reflected in current polling. 59% of registered voters are not too confident/not at all confident in Donald Trump's ability to act ethically in office, while even fewer, 34% express confidence in Trump's ability to respect democratic values. His temperament is further reflected in his declaration of the January 6th, 2021, U.S. Capitol riot a “day of love”. To his supporters, Trump is seen as relatable and a simple and straightforward figure, who trusts his instincts.

Trump gained notoriety for frequently referring to himself in the third person.

== Mental capacities ==
According to a review of Trump's public appearances by The New York Times, Trump's speeches became longer, less focused, harsher and more profane over the years. On one occasion, he recounted how the audience at his debate with Kamala Harris was on his side, even though there was no audience as the debate was held in an empty hall. According to the article, "He digresses into bizarre tangents about golf, about sharks, about his own 'beautiful' body. He relishes 'a great day in Louisiana' after spending the day in Georgia. He expresses fear that North Korea is 'trying to kill me' when he presumably means Iran."

== Popular culture ==
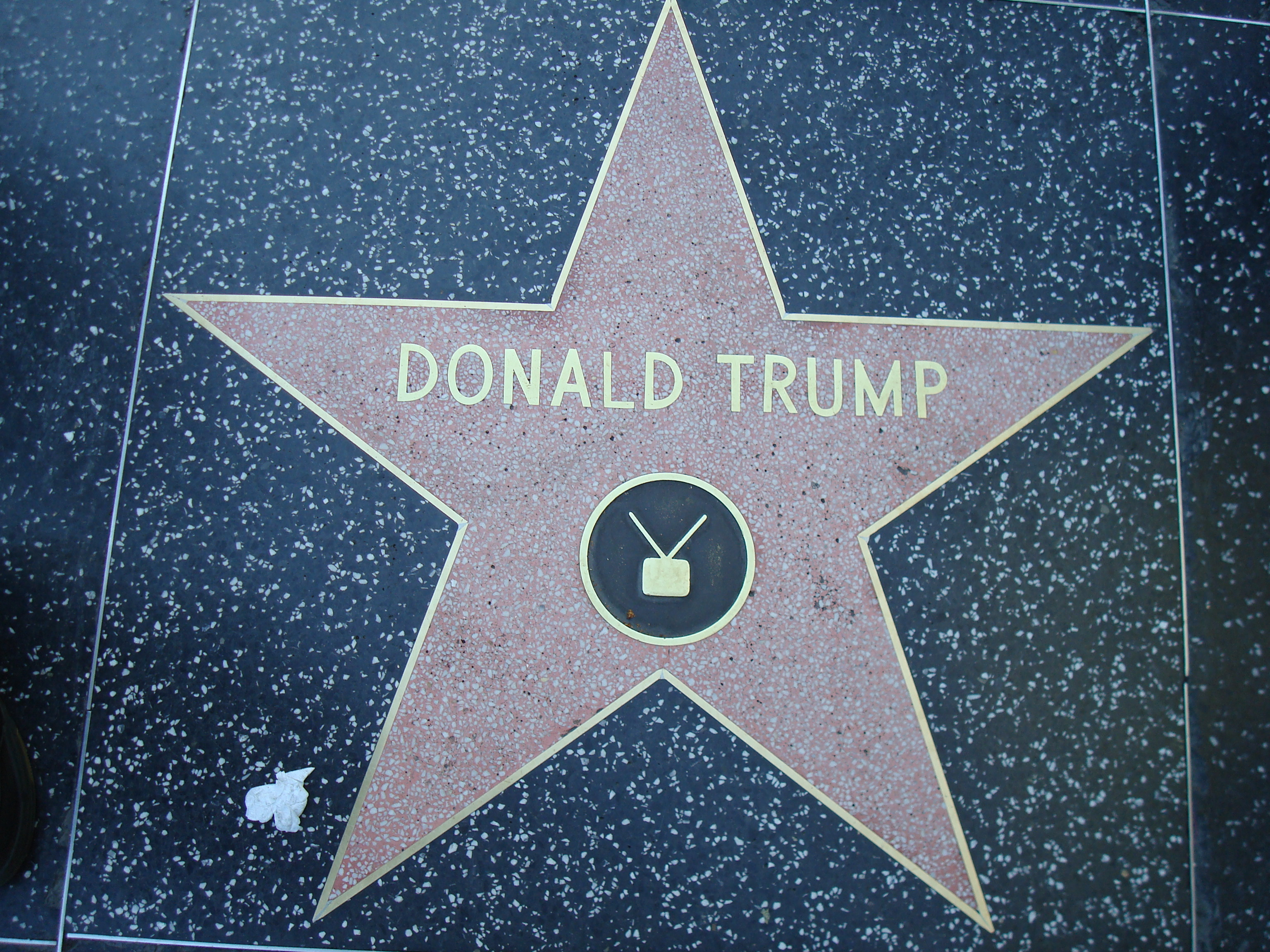
Trump's star on the Hollywood Walk of Fame

Trump has played himself in the role of a rich and powerful businessman in cameo appearances in films and television shows and from 2004 to 2015 as the host of the reality show The Apprentice.

Trump has been the subject of parody, comedy, and caricature. He has been parodied regularly on Saturday Night Live by Phil Hartman, Darrell Hammond, and Alec Baldwin, and in South Park as Mr. Garrison. The Simpsons episode "Bart to the Future" – written during his 2000 campaign for the Reform Party – anticipated a Trump presidency. A parody series called The President Show debuted in April 2017 on Comedy Central, while another one called Our Cartoon President debuted on Showtime in February 2018.

Trump's wealth and lifestyle had been a fixture of hip hop lyrics since the 1980s; he was named in hundreds of songs, most often in a positive tone. Mentions of Trump in hip hop turned negative and pejorative after he ran for office in 2015, including the release of a song called "FDT" (for "Fuck Donald Trump") which later topped the iTunes charts after Joe Biden defeated Trump in the 2020 United States presidential election.

In Chinese, his surname has been transliterated as Chuānpǔ (川普) and Tèlǎngpǔ (特朗普). The government of China and media organs of said government use the latter transliteration. The former is used for a nickname, Chuān Jiànguó (川建国 "Trump Build Country"), that is meant to convey the idea that China benefits from Trump's actions.

== Relationship with the press ==
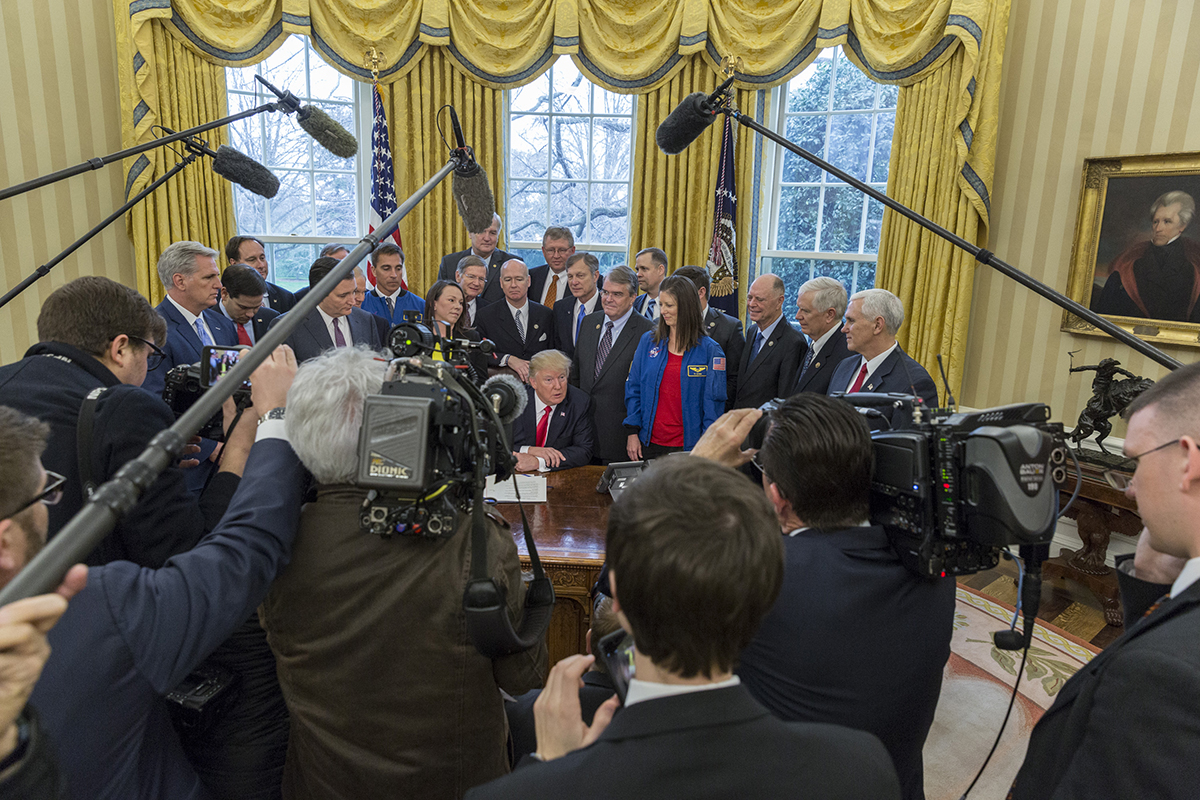
Trump talking to the press, March 2017

Throughout his career, Trump has sought media attention, with a "love-hate" relationship with the press. Trump began promoting himself in the press in the 1970s. Fox News anchor Bret Baier and former House speaker Paul Ryan have characterized Trump as a "troll" who makes controversial statements to see people's "heads explode". According to a 2018 study by the conservative media watchdog Media Research Center, 92% of media coverage of the Trump administration portrays him negatively, which has made Trump accuse the mainstream media of bias.

In the 2016 campaign, Trump benefited from a record amount of free media coverage, elevating his standing in the Republican primaries. New York Times writer Amy Chozick wrote in 2018 that Trump's media dominance, which enthralls the public and creates "can't miss" reality television-type coverage, was politically beneficial for him. According to Columbia Journalism Review, "Because Trump entered the presidential stage from the world of business hucksterism and reality TV, he was seen, from the outset, as a less serious contender. In fact, he was treated as a joke." Salena Zito wrote for The Atlantic that "the press takes [Trump] literally, but not seriously; his supporters take him seriously, but not literally."

Throughout his 2016 presidential campaign and his presidency, Trump has accused the press of bias, calling it the "fake news media" and "the enemy of the people". After winning the election, journalist Lesley Stahl recounted Trump's allegedly saying he intentionally demeaned and discredited the media "so when you write negative stories about me no one will believe you."

Trump has privately and publicly mused about revoking the press credentials of journalists he views as critical. His administration moved to revoke the press passes of two White House reporters, which were restored by the courts. In 2019, a member of the foreign press reported many of the same concerns as those of media in the U.S., expressing concern that a normalization process by reporters and media results in an inaccurate characterization of Trump. The Trump White House held about a hundred formal press briefings in 2017, declining by half during 2018 and to two in 2019.

Trump has employed the legal system as an intimidation tactic against the press. In early 2020, the Trump campaign sued The New York Times, The Washington Post, and CNN for alleged defamation. These lawsuits lacked merit and were not likely to succeed, however.

== Political image ==
=== Approval ratings ===
During his first term in office, Trump's average Gallup approval rating of 41% was the lowest of any president since World War II. In January 2020, his Gallup rating reached 49%, the highest point since he took office, with 63% of those polled approving his handling of the economy. Though his approval and disapproval ratings were unusually stable during his first term, they dropped significantly to his lowest point of 34% after losing and attempting to overturn the 2020 election.

In 2021, Gallup found Trump to be the most polarizing president to date and also the only president never to register higher than 50% job approval at any point in his presidency. As of November 2025, Trump's highest rating in his second term was 47%.

In Gallup's end-of-year poll asking Americans to name the man they admire the most, Trump placed second to Obama in 2017 and 2018, tied with Obama in 2019, and placed first in 2020. Since Gallup started conducting the poll in 1948, Trump is the first elected president not to be named most admired in his first year in office.

=== International image ===
Globally, a 2021 Gallup poll of 60 countries comparing the approval ratings of U.S. leadership found that only seven of them viewed the Trump administration positively. Overall ratings were similar to those in the last two years of the George W. Bush presidency.

During his second term his ratings declined dramatically and his public image suffered significantly both domestically and abroad.

=== Politician ===
Trump was viewed as not a serious candidate during the 2016 presidential campaign. He was viewed positively by some voters as an outsider who was opposed to politicians, appealing in the context of the Tea Party movement.

=== Social media ===
Trump's presence on social media has attracted attention worldwide since he joined Twitter in March 2009. He frequently tweeted during the 2016 election campaign and has continued to do so as president. As of March 2024, Trump has more than 87 million Twitter followers.

By the end of May 2020, Trump had written about 52,000 tweets. These include 22,115 tweets over seven years before his presidential candidacy, 8,159 tweets during the 1 1/2 years of his candidacy and transition period, and 14,186 tweets over the first three years of his presidency. Of all those tweets, Trump was found to have lied 30,000 plus times.

Trump has frequently used Twitter as a direct means of communication with the public. A White House press secretary said early in his presidency that Trump's tweets are official statements by the president of the United States, employed for announcing policy or personnel changes. Trump used Twitter to fire Secretary of State Rex Tillerson in March 2018 and Secretary of Defense Mark Esper in November 2020.

Many of Trump's tweets contain false assertions. In May 2020, Twitter began tagging some Trump tweets with fact-checking warnings and labels for violations of Twitter rules. Trump responded by threatening to "strongly regulate" or "close down" social media platforms.

=== False statements ===
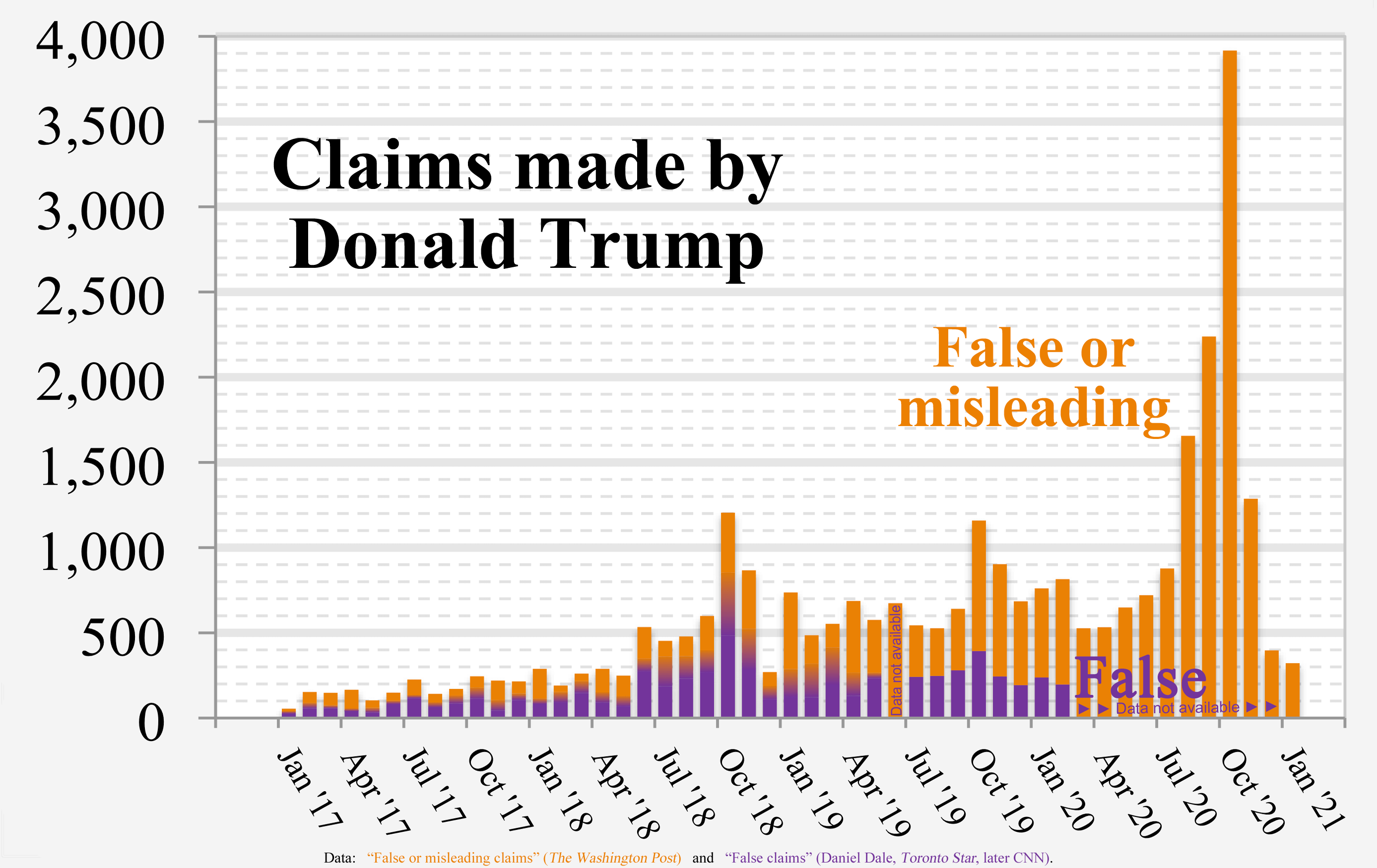
Fact-checkers from The Washington Post, the Toronto Star, and CNN compiled data on "false or misleading claims" (orange background), and "false claims" (violet foreground).

As president, Trump frequently made false statements in public speeches and remarks. The misinformation has been documented by fact-checkers; academics and the media have widely described the phenomenon as unprecedented in American politics. This behavior was similarly observed when he was a presidential candidate. His falsehoods have also become a distinctive part of his political identity.

Trump uttered "at least one false or misleading claim per day on 91 of his first 99 days" in office, according to The New York Times, and 1,318 total in his first 263 days in office, according to the "Fact Checker" political analysis column of The Washington Post. By the Post's tally, it took Trump 601 days to reach 5,000 false or misleading statements and another 226 days to reach the 10,000 mark. For the seven weeks leading up to the midterm elections, it rose to an average of thirty per day from 4.9 during his first hundred days in office. The Post's reported tally is 22,247 as of August 27, 2020, with the 2019 total more than double the cumulative total of 2017 and 2018.

Some of Trump's falsehoods are inconsequential, such as his claims of a large crowd size during his inauguration. Others have had more far-reaching effects, such as Trump's promotion of unproven antimalarial drugs as a treatment for COVID-19 in a press conference and on Twitter in March 2020. The claims had consequences worldwide, such as a shortage of these drugs in the United States and panic-buying in Africa and South Asia. The state of Florida obtained nearly a million doses for its hospitals, even though most of them did not want the drug. Other misinformation, such as Trump's retweet of unverified videos of a far-right British nationalist group in November 2017, serves Trump's domestic political purposes. As a matter of principle, Trump does not apologize for his falsehoods.

Despite the frequency of Trump's falsehoods, the media rarely referred to them as "lies", a word that has in the past been avoided out of respect for the presidential office. Nevertheless, in August 2018 The Washington Post declared for the first time that some of Trump's misstatements (statements concerning hush money paid to Stormy Daniels and Playboy model Karen McDougal) were lies.

In 2020, Trump was a significant source of disinformation on national voting practices and the COVID-19 pandemic. Trump's attacks on mail-in ballots and other election practices served to weaken public faith in the integrity of the 2020 presidential election, while his disinformation about the pandemic dangerously delayed and weakened the national response to it.

Some view the nature and frequency of Trump's falsehoods as having profound and corrosive consequences on democracy. James Pfiffner, professor of policy and government at George Mason University, wrote in 2019 that Trump lies differently from previous presidents, because he offers "egregious false statements that are demonstrably contrary to well-known facts"; these lies are the "most important" of all Trump lies. By calling facts into question, people will be unable to properly evaluate their government, with beliefs or policy irrationally settled by "political power"; this erodes liberal democracy, wrote Pfiffner.

==== Promotion of conspiracy theories ====
Before and throughout his presidency, Trump has promoted numerous conspiracy theories, including "birtherism", the Clinton body count theory, QAnon and alleged Ukrainian interference in U.S. elections. In October 2020, Trump retweeted a QAnon follower who asserted that Osama bin Laden was still alive, a body double had been killed in his place and "Biden and Obama may have had Seal Team 6 killed."

=== Racism ===
Many of Trump's comments and actions have been seen as racist or racially charged. He has repeatedly denied he is racist, asserting: "I am the least racist person there is anywhere in the world." Many of his supporters say the way he speaks reflects his rejection of political correctness, while others accept it because they share such beliefs. Scholars have discussed Trump's rhetoric in the context of white supremacy.

Several studies and surveys have found that racist attitudes fueled Trump's political ascendance and have been more important than economic factors in determining the allegiance of Trump voters. Racist and Islamophobic attitudes have been shown to be a powerful indicator of support for Trump. In national polling, about half of Americans say that Trump is racist; a greater proportion believe that he has emboldened racists.

In 1975, he settled a 1973 Department of Justice lawsuit that alleged housing discrimination against black renters. He has also been accused of racism for insisting a group of black and Latino teenagers were guilty of raping a white woman in the 1989 Central Park jogger case, even after they were exonerated by DNA evidence in 2002. He has maintained his position on the matter into 2019.

Trump relaunched his political career in 2011 as a leading proponent of "birther" conspiracy theories alleging that Barack Obama, the first black U.S. president, was not born in the United States. In April 2011, Trump claimed credit for pressuring the White House to publish the "long-form" birth certificate, which he considered fraudulent, and later saying this made him "very popular". In September 2016, amid pressure, he acknowledged that Obama was born in the U.S. and falsely claimed the rumors had been started by Hillary Clinton during her 2008 presidential campaign. In 2017, he reportedly still expressed birther views in private.

"Stopping" people
you have nothing in common with

And if you don't stop people that you've never seen before, that you have nothing in common with, your country is going to fail. ... This double-tailed monster [of green energy and immigration] destroys everything in its wake, and they cannot let that happen any longer. You're doing it because you want to be nice, you want to be politically correct, and you're destroying your heritage.

— President Donald Trump
to the UN General Assembly,
September 23, 2025

According to an analysis in Political Science Quarterly, Trump made "explicitly racist appeals to whites" during his 2016 presidential campaign. In particular, his campaign launch speech drew widespread criticism for falsely claiming Mexican immigrants were "bringing drugs, they're bringing crime, they're rapists." His later comments about a Mexican-American judge presiding over a civil suit regarding Trump University were also criticized as racist.

Trump answers questions from reporters about the Unite the Right rally in Charlottesville.

Trump's comments in reaction to the 2017 Charlottesville far-right rally were interpreted by some as implying a moral equivalence between white supremacist demonstrators and counter-protesters.

In a January 2018 Oval Office meeting to discuss immigration legislation, he reportedly referred to El Salvador, Haiti, Honduras, and African nations as "shithole countries". His remarks were condemned as racist worldwide, as well as by many members of Congress.

In July 2019, Trump tweeted that four Democratic members of Congress – all four minority women, three of them native-born Americans – should "go back" to the countries they "came from". Two days later the House of Representatives voted 240–187, mostly along party lines, to condemn his "racist comments". White nationalist publications and social media sites praised his remarks, which continued over the following days. Trump continued to make similar remarks during his 2020 campaign.

=== Misogyny and allegations of sexual assault and misconduct ===
Trump has a history of insulting and belittling women when speaking to media and in tweet. He made lewd comments, demeaned women's looks, and called them names like 'dog', 'crazed, crying lowlife', 'face of a pig', or 'horseface'.

In October 2016, two days before the second presidential debate, a 2005 "hot mic" recording surfaced in which Trump was heard bragging about kissing and groping women without their consent, saying "when you're a star, they let you do it, you can do anything ... grab 'em by the pussy." The incident's widespread media exposure led to Trump's first public apology during the campaign and caused outrage across the political spectrum.

At least twenty-six women have publicly accused Trump of sexual misconduct as of September 2020, including his then-wife Ivana. There were allegations of rape, violence, being kissed and groped without consent, looking under women's skirts, sexual assault of underage girls, and walking in on naked women. In 2016, he denied all accusations, calling them "false smears", and alleged there was a conspiracy against him.

In 2023, a federal jury in New York found Trump liable for the sexual abuse and defamation of writer E. Jean Carroll, awarding her $5 million in damages. The presiding judge later clarified that the jury’s finding of sexual abuse met the common definition of rape. In a subsequent 2024 trial, Trump was ordered to pay Carroll an additional $83.3 million for further defamatory statements.

Following Trump's 2024 re-election, and the passage of the Epstein Files Transparency Act that led to the release of the Epstein Files in late-2025 and early 2026, several previously unverified tips regarding alleged misconduct and trafficking involving Trump and Jeffrey Epstein revealed that the FBI had conducted secret investigations into these ties dating back to the 1990s. Other files also revealed that the FBI had in fact secretly investigated Epstein-related allegations against Trump.

=== Allegations of inciting violence ===
Some research suggests Trump's rhetoric causes an increased incidence of hate crimes. During the 2016 campaign, he urged or praised physical attacks against protesters or reporters. Since then, some defendants prosecuted for hate crimes or violent acts cited Trump's rhetoric in arguing that they were not culpable or should receive a lighter sentence. In August 2019 it was reported that a man who allegedly assaulted a minor for perceived disrespect toward the national anthem had cited Trump's rhetoric in his own defense. In August 2019, a nationwide review by ABC News identified at least 36 criminal cases in which Trump was invoked in direct connection with violence or threats of violence. Of these, 29 were based around someone echoing presidential rhetoric, while the other seven were someone protesting it or not having direct linkage.

=== Support among Christians ===
Donald Trump has high support among White Evangelical Christians, especially Christians who don't attend Church regularly. A significant portion of Evangelicals believe Donald Trump is a divinely chosen figure - A poll from Public Religion Research Institute (PRRI) post‑2024 election survey of about 5,700 U.S. adults found that 25% of all voters agreed with the statement "God ordained Donald Trump to be the winner of the 2024 presidential election." Among white evangelical Protestants, that figure was 60%, and among Hispanic Protestants it was 45%. Pew Research Center survey of roughly 6,000–8,900 adults found that about 32% of Americans said Trump's election must be part of God's plan, though only around 4–5% said God chose him because of his policies. Among white evangelicals, that share rose to about 60–63% saying his election was part of God's plan, even if not necessarily his policies. A December 2019 survey found 21.4% of respondents said Trump was anointed; among white evangelicals it was 29%, and among white Pentecostals as high as 53%

== Recognition ==
In 1983, Trump received the Jewish National Fund Tree of Life Award, after he helped fund two playgrounds, a park, and a reservoir in Israel. In 1986, he received the Ellis Island Medal of Honor in recognition of "patriotism, tolerance, brotherhood and diversity", and in 1995 was awarded the President's Medal from the Freedoms Foundation for his support of youth programs. He has been awarded five honorary doctorates, but one was revoked by Robert Gordon University in 2015 after Trump called for a Muslim ban, citing Trump's speech being "wholly incompatible ... with the ethos and values of the university". The remaining awards are Lehigh University's honorary doctorate of laws in 1988, Wagner College's honorary doctorate of humane letters in 2004, and Liberty University's honorary doctorates of business and law in 2012 and 2017 respectively.

In December 2016, Time named Trump as its "Person of the Year", but Trump took issue with the magazine for referring to him as the "President of the Divided States of America". In the same month, he was named Financial Times Person of the Year and was ranked by Forbes the second-most powerful person in the world after Vladimir Putin. As president, Trump received the Collar of The Order of Abdulaziz al Saud from Saudi Arabia in 2017.

== See also ==
- Donald Trump in popular culture
- Every Second Counts (video contest)
- God Emperor Trump
- International reactions to the 2016 United States presidential election
- Make America Great Again
- Opinion polling on the first Trump presidency
- Opinion polling on the second Trump presidency
- Public image of Barack Obama
- Public image of Joe Biden
- Public image of Melania Trump
- Indictment of Donald Trump
- List of nicknames used by Donald Trump
- List of nicknames of presidents of the United States § Donald Trump
