= Public image of Melania Trump =

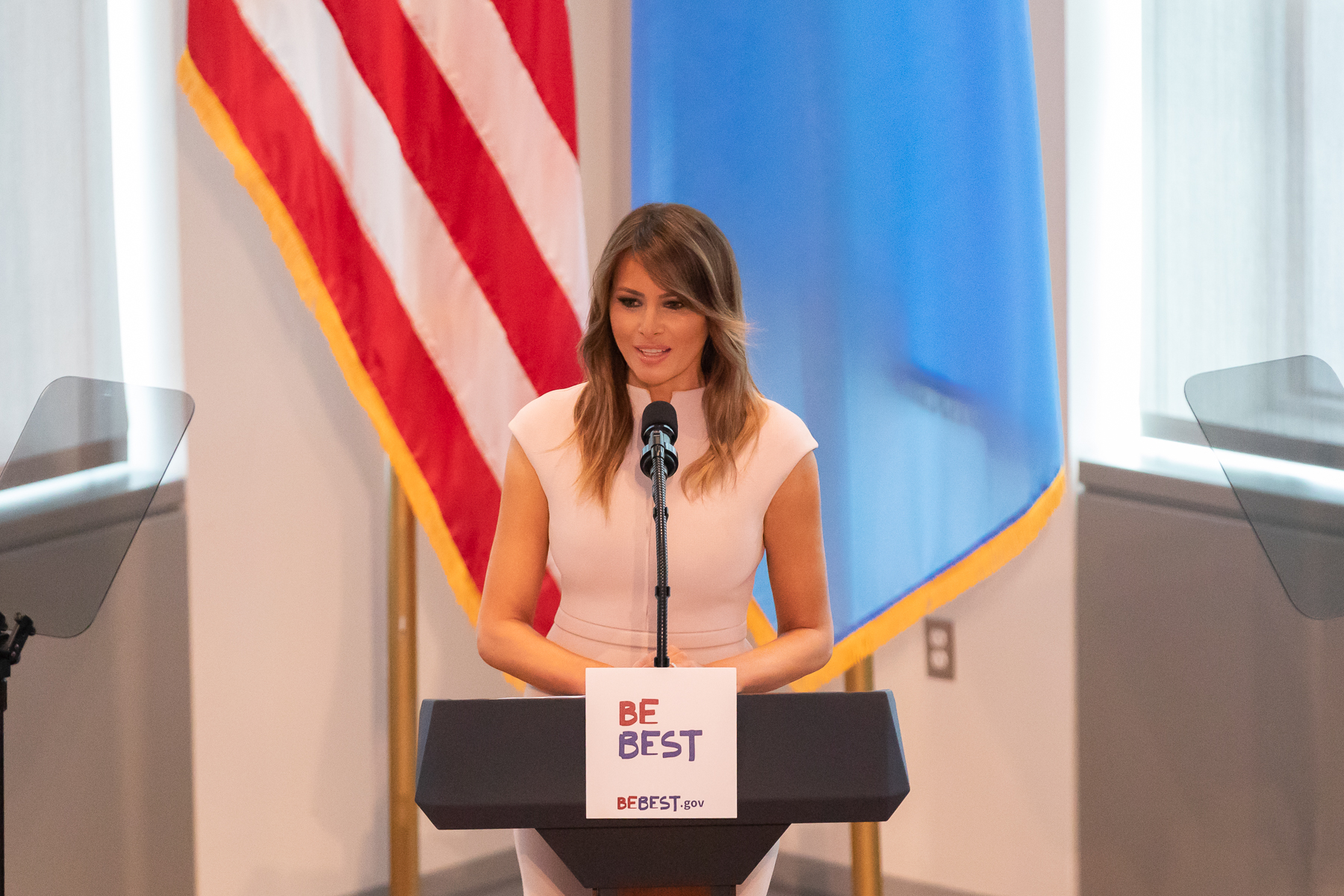
Trump speaking at a United Nations event

Melania Trump has been the subject of extensive media attention and public interest during her tenures as first lady of the United States from 2017 to 2021, and again since 2025. Her private nature led many to speculate about her personality, her beliefs, and her thoughts about being first lady. Her wardrobe was of particular interest to the public, not only because it is a common subject discussed in regard to first ladies but because of her past as a fashion model. Also of interest was the fact that she was only the second foreign-born woman to be first lady, which was culturally significant both in the United States and in her home country of Slovenia. Trump had low approval ratings relative to previous first ladies, but she was regularly rated as the most popular member of the Trump family.

== Privacy and public speculation ==
Melania Trump has cultivated her public image by limiting public interaction, minimizing public statements and declining to answer questions about her life. Such is the secrecy around her life that one biographer, Mary Jordan, reported that she had to engage in clandestine interactions with associates of the Trumps to get information. The relative lack of information has allowed spectators to impose various interpretations of her life onto Melania. She has been portrayed as an innocent victim of an aggressive husband, an immigrant who was thrust into the public spotlight against her will, a vapid model with no input of her own, and a woman who became successful purely through luck. She is often seen as cold by the public, though people who interact with her describe her as a warm presence. Her private nature is contrasted with her sociable stepdaughter Ivanka, who Donald often put on equal footing with Melania when discussing them and had regularly had them on either side of him when having his photo taken.

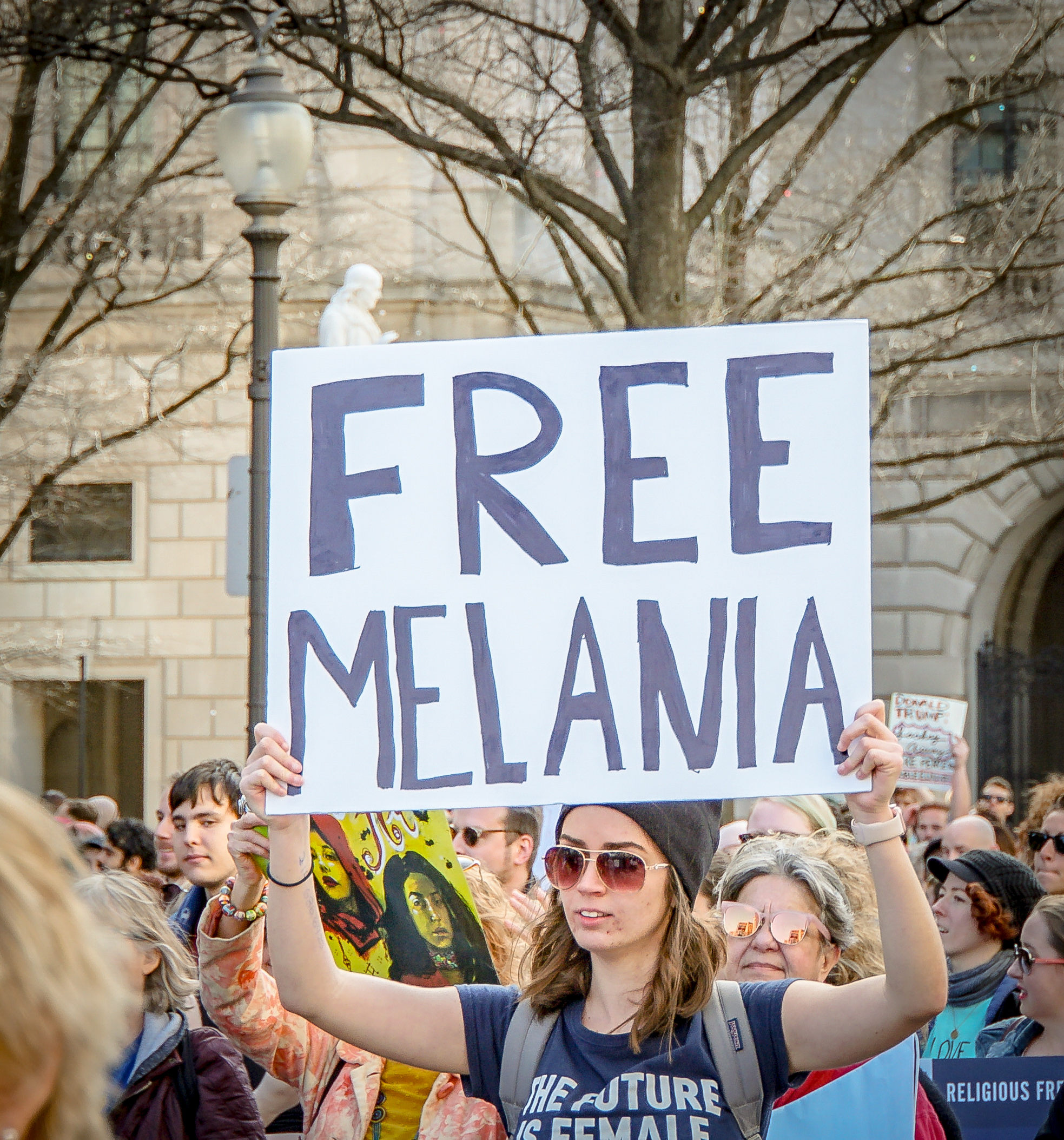
A protester with a "Free Melania" sign

Melania is seen as a contrast to Donald, as she is more reserved compared to his assertive personality. Both, however, have lived relatively solitary lives. First lady biographer Betty Boyd Caroli compared Trump's deliberate obscurity as first lady to Bess Truman, who similarly avoided taking on a large staff or being active in major initiatives while she was first lady. CNN White House correspondent Kate Bennett wrote in her biography of Melania Trump that she was "one of the most private and guarded first ladies in modern history". Trump's staff were instructed to ignore all media questions while she was first lady, including those about her official activities and where she was at a given time. This led to false rumors that she had abandoned the first ladyship after she was not seen for three weeks in 2018.

Rumors persisted throughout the Trump presidency that Melania and Donald had a secret animosity toward one another. This was amplified by her decision not to immediately move to the White House and again upon the discovery that Donald may have committed adultery with Stormy Daniels. Other incidents also provoked speculation, such as a video of her swatting her husband's hand away in May 2017, her trip to see detained children at the border in June 2018, and a tweet in support of LeBron James's charity work a day after Donald criticized the basketball player in August 2018. One urban legend was widely spread claiming that she had moved out of the White House into a home in Potomac, Maryland, with her parents. The rumors led to popular use of the hashtag #FreeMelania by those who believed them. Though she disliked the idea that people saw her as helpless, Melania found the campaign amusing. This became less common by 2020 as she took a more active role in the administration. She was also seen as unhappy because she was rarely seen smiling in public, to which she responded that she does not believe in fake smiles – an effect of her Slovenian upbringing, where smiling socially is less common. Chris Christie, who worked closely with the Trumps in the 2016 presidential campaign, cast doubt on the rumors, saying that Melania was independent but supported her husband.

== Fashion ==
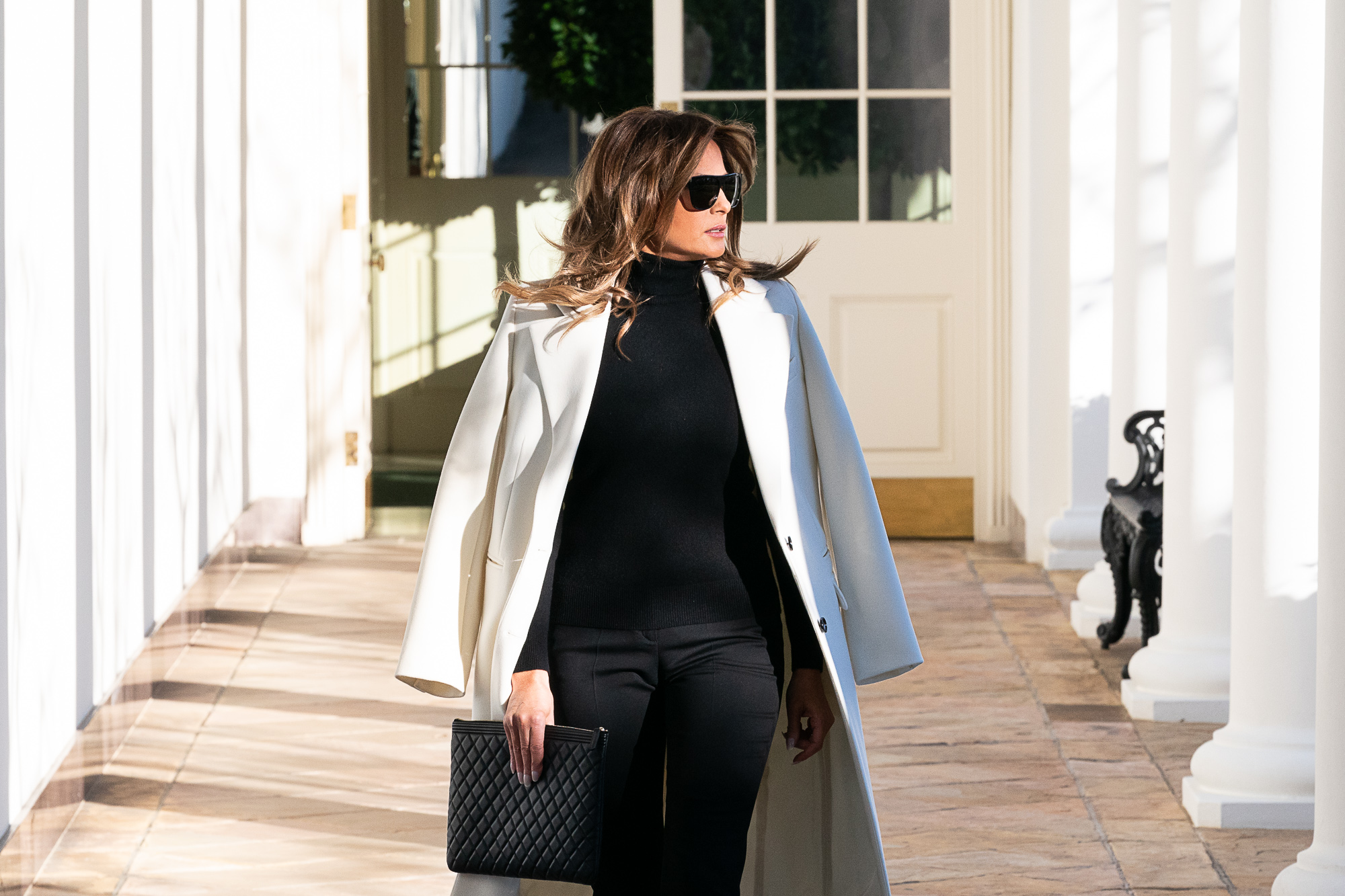
Trump wearing a coat over her shoulders

As with previous first ladies, Trump's fashion was heavily scrutinized, and particularly expensive pieces were criticized. More than other first ladies, her fashion was scrutinized in the context of her past as a fashion model and her marriage to a billionaire. Vogue compared her wardrobe as first lady to those of Jacqueline Kennedy and Nancy Reagan, and it said that she preferred "strongly tailored pieces", wearing almost exclusively outfits designed by high-end designers. Melania's wardrobe played into fashion diplomacy, in which her clothes delivered political statements or conveyed certain messages. In some cases, her lack of political involvement caused a subversion of fashion diplomacy in which "her message is that there is no message". Despite her experience in fashion, she disliked that it was such a major aspect of news coverage about her as first lady.

Coats were a common trademark of Melania's fashion, and she sometimes wore them on her shoulders without using the sleeves. During formal events, she commonly wore Dior dresses accentuated with gloves and wore her hair up. Melania worked closely with Hervé Pierre when styling her fashion, but they dismissed the idea that he worked as her wardrobe stylist. She retained her previous hair stylist Mordechai Alvow and her previous make up artist Nicole Byrl when she became first lady. She preferred to do her own shopping, typically from Net-a-Porter. The fashion industry generally leans away from the Trump administration's politics, and many fashion designers have stated that they refuse to work with Melania because of political differences. When preparing for speeches, she dedicated more attention to her physical appearance than content or delivery, which her staff felt affected her ability to promote her causes. In public, Melania came to be known for her distinctive squinting expression that she often wore. The official portrait of Melania Trump by Régine Mahaux for Melania's second term as First Lady sparked attention as this was the first official portrait of a First Lady in black and white ever since a choice between a color photograph or a black and white photograph was available.

Trump has been identified and described as having Mar-a-Lago face.

== Heritage ==
Since the only other foreign-born first lady, Louisa Adams, was born in London as the daughter of an American, Melania has been seen by the American public as the first foreigner first lady. In both the United States and Slovenia, she is seen as ignoring or disregarding her Slovenian heritage. Having a Slovenian-born woman as the American first lady became a point of national pride in Slovenia, and it gave the nation a sense of recognition on the world stage. This includes an element of commodification as imagery of the first lady is used as a sort of national brand, particularly in the tourism industry. Slovenia was particularly susceptible to this phenomenon as a post-communist nation that had yet to fully develop its own identity. Melania Trump's hometown Sevnica has developed a small tourist industry around her, and Melania-themed merchandise was common during her tenure as first lady. These items never use Melania's full name, substituting it with "first lady" or "M", as she is protective of her personality rights.

== Cultural depictions ==
Bosnian sculptor Stevo Selak created a statue of Trump in 2017. Madame Tussauds in New York City unveiled a wax sculpture of her in 2018. Jim Carrey drew a portrait of Trump in 2018.

On 5 July 2019, a wooden statue carved out of a tree trunk with a chainsaw was unveiled by the Sava river in Rožno, near Trump's hometown Sevnica in Slovenia. The artwork was commissioned by U.S. artist Brad Downey, who hired a local craftsman and artist Aleš Župevc (aka Maxi) to create the statue. The statue is styled after the blue dress she wore during her husband's (Donald Trump) presidential inauguration in 2017. Local reception of the statue was mixed; some residents praised it, while others called it a "disgrace" and likened it to Smurfette. In July 2020, the statue was torched and removed for its protection. However, later in 2020 it was replaced with a lookalike statue in bronze.

Gina Gershon has portrayed Trump for Funny or Die, The Tonight Show Starring Jimmy Fallon, and the off-Broadway show The Trump Family Special. Laura Benanti plays Trump on The Late Show with Stephen Colbert. Trump has been impersonated on RuPaul's Drag Race by Aquaria in the tenth season (2018) and by Plastique Tiara in the season 11 episode "Trump: The Rusical" (2019). Cecily Strong impersonated Trump several times while on the cast of Saturday Night Live and reported that Trump enjoyed her impression. Trump is voiced by Cody Lindquist on Our Cartoon President and by Mila Filatova on The President Show. The first lady's press secretary, Stephanie Grisham, condemned a music video released by rapper T.I. in October 2018, which featured a Melania Trump lookalike dancing naked in a set resembling the Oval Office.

Following the release of her documentary film Melania (2026), Amazon users protested by purchasing the erotic novel Melania: Devourer of Men, making the book the number one Amazon search result for 'Melania Trump.' The book depicts Trump as a manananggal.

== Approval ratings and historical ranking ==
During the 2016 presidential election, Trump became the only candidate's spouse to have a negative approval rating since polling began in 1988. Her approval rating did not significantly change throughout the campaign because her favorable and unfavorable ratings increased at the same rate when her name recognition increased. Scandals involving Melania, including plagiarism accusations and scrutiny of her modeling career, may have been factors on her approval rating during the campaign. Her relative absence from the campaign also conflicted with the public's expectation of a candidate's spouse's role.

As First Lady, Trump managed to improve her approval ratings from 2016 to mid-2018. CNN had her at 36% approval upon her husband's inauguration, and Gallup found her at 37% approval when she was staying in New York at the beginning of her tenure. The former poll showed that 23% had no opinion, significantly higher than expected for an incoming first lady. The two preceding first ladies had approval ratings above 70% at the start of their respective tenures. A year into her tenure, she was the most popular member of the Trump family among the public. Melania received public sympathy in 2018, following allegations that Donald had engaged in extramarital affairs. A CNN poll in January 2018 found that she had an approval rating of 47%, compared to the president's 40%. This rose to 57% in the poll's April edition, after the fallout of the allegations occurred. In December 2018, CNN reported that Melania's strongest base of support came from older, white, male Republicans and conservatives, while she had the least approval from women who were young or college-educated.

In March 2019, YouGov reported that Melania Trump, with 51% approval, was polling more popularly among the American public than other members of her family: her husband Donald, stepchildren Donald Jr., Eric, and Ivanka, and her stepson-in-law Jared Kushner. In August 2020, Morning Consult, in conjunction with Politico, reported that Melania, with 45% approval, was polling more favorably among the American public than any other Republican figures listed in the survey, including her family members, Vice President Mike Pence, Senate majority leader Mitch McConnell, and House minority leader Kevin McCarthy.

In Gallup's annual poll of the most admired women, Melania Trump ranked in the top ten in each of the years of her first stint as first lady but never topped the list. She joined Bess Truman and Lady Bird Johnson as the only American first ladies who had never been named the most admired woman in this survey since Gallup had begun conducting the annual survey in the 1940s.

Trump finished her tenure in 2021 as the least popular first lady ever polled, according to polling by CNN, SRSS, and Gallup. Her final approval rating was 42%, and her final disapproval rating was 47%; she was the only first lady who finished with a net disapproval rating. Previous first ladies since the 1970s had final popularity ratings of 71% on average. The second-least popular first lady polled was Hillary Clinton, with a final approval rating of 52% and a final disapproval rating of 39%.

In December 2020, the Siena College Research Institute released a study surveying scholars and historians on their assessments of American first ladies. It was the fifth such first ladies study that the Institute had conducted since 1982, and the first in which Trump appeared. Trump was ranked as being the worst of 40 assessed American first ladies, receiving the lowest assessments in all of the metrics that were weighed.

In February 2026, more than one year after assuming the role of first lady again, Trump had a 41 percent favorable rating and a 47 percent unfavorable rating, with a margin of error of plus or minus 3.2 percent, according to an Economist/YouGov poll.

== See also ==
- Cultural depictions of Ivanka Trump
- Melania Trump replacement conspiracy theory
- Public image of Donald Trump
