= Dmitri Mehlhorn =

American political advisor

- Citizenship: American
- Education: Stanford University, Harvard University, and Yale Law School
- Occupations: Political advisor, attorney
- Website: dmitrimehlhorn.com

Dmitri Mehlhorn is an American political advisor. He is an active figure in anti-Trump and Democratic Party politics in the United States.

== Work with Reid Hoffman ==
A political advisor to Reid Hoffman, the co-founder of LinkedIn and a Democratic donor, Melhorn became involved in politics in 2015, when Trump announced his candidacy for President of the United States. After Trump gained the presidency in 2016, he became involved in efforts "to get him to not win another election" through social networks and political activism.

=== Controversies ===
In 2018, through Mehlhorn leadership of Investing in Us, Hoffman's political strategy investment firm, Hoffman and Mehlhorn were implicated in funding a disinformation campaign intended to influence the 2017 United States Senate special election in Alabama. Mehlhorn and Hoffman denied direct involvement or knowledge of the campaign despite it being worked on by Investing in Us employee Sara K. Hudson alongside the disinformation research firm New Knowledge (later renamed Yonder).

In 2024, following the attempted assassination of Donald Trump in Pennsylvania, Mehlhorn suggested in an email that the shooting may have been a false flag incident. He subsequently apologized and indicated he regretted sending the message. Shortly after, Reid Hoffman announced Mehlhorn’s departure as Hoffman’s chief political strategist.

== Personal life ==
In February 2025, it was reported that Mehlhorn had moved to Canada.
