= Avril Lavigne replacement conspiracy theory =

Hoax claiming musician Avril Lavigne is dead

Photo of Lavigne with the name "Melissa" written on her hand

In 2011, a conspiracy theory originated that alleges the Canadian singer Avril Lavigne died by suicide in 2003, shortly after the release of her debut studio album, Let Go (2002), and was replaced by a body double named Melissa Vandella. Evidence used to support the theory include changes in Lavigne's appearance between 2003 and the present, supposed subliminal messaging in her follow-up album, Under My Skin (2004), and a photoshoot in which Lavigne has the name "Melissa" written on her hand. The theory is the subject of the BBC Sounds podcast Who Replaced Avril Lavigne?

The origins of the theory can be traced back to the 2011 Brazilian blog Avril Está Morta (transl. Avril Is Dead), which led to conversations on Internet forums sharing supposed evidence of Lavigne's replacement. The theory gained more traction in May 2017, when a Twitter user posted a thread recounting the theory. Lavigne herself has denied the theory on multiple occasions.

== Origins ==
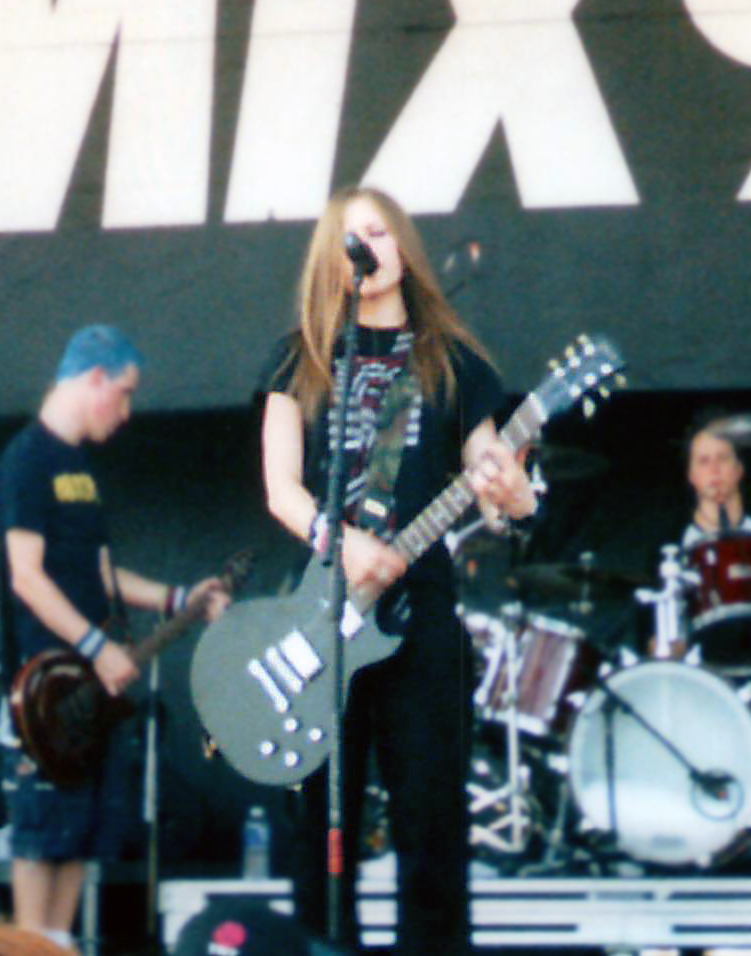
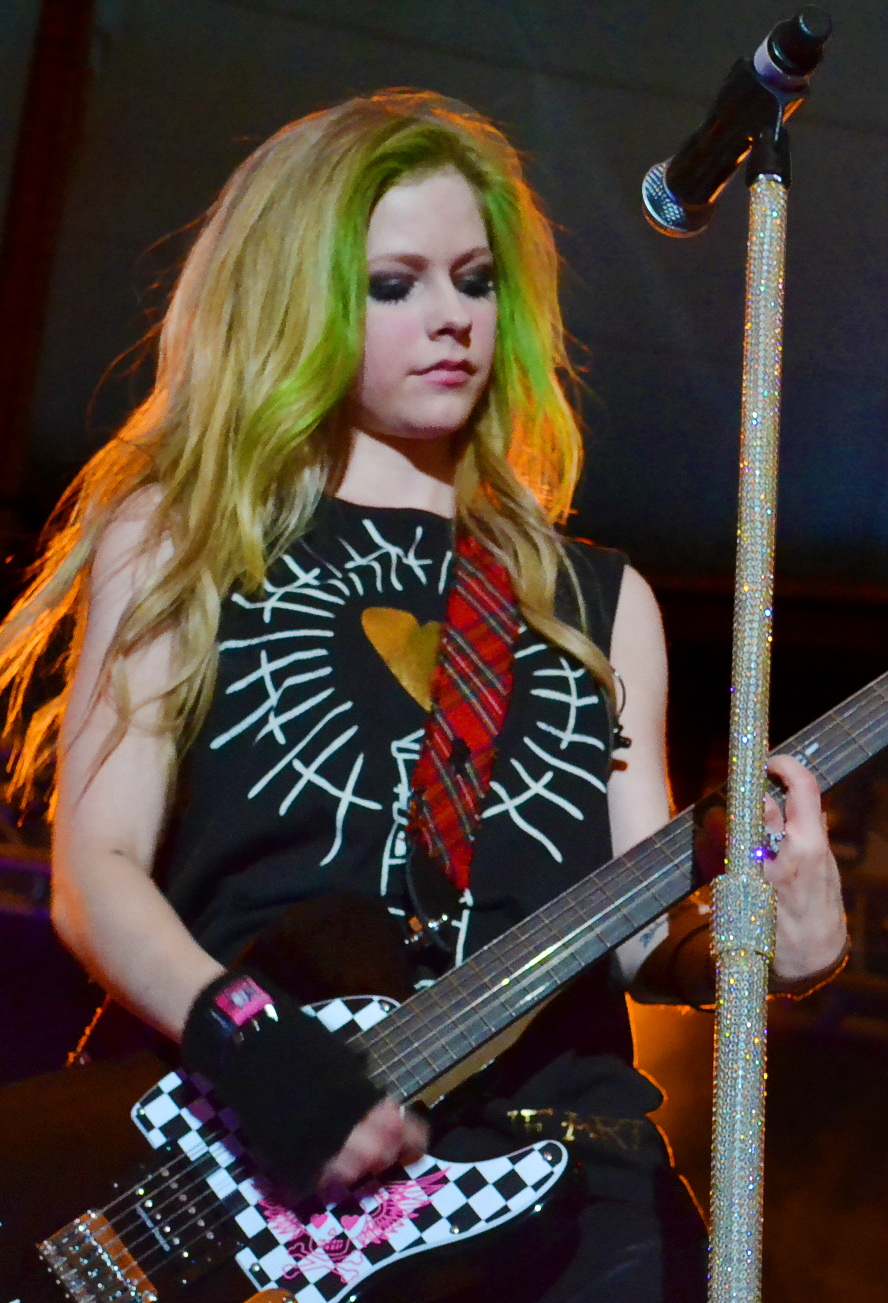
Lavigne performing in 2002 (left) and in 2011 (right), the year that the Avril Está Morta blog formed

The origins of the replacement theory can be dated back to 2011, with a Brazilian blog named Avril Está Morta, or Avril Is Dead, although some sources say that the rumour dates back as far as 2005. The theory alleges that the pressures of fame, combined with the death of Lavigne's grandfather, sent her into a deep depression after the release of her 2002 debut album, Let Go, and that the singer died by suicide shortly after.

According to the conspiracy theory, a look-alike named "Melissa" was originally hired to distract paparazzi, protecting a reclusive Lavigne. It alleges that Lavigne befriended "Melissa", that shortly before the singer's supposed death her body double was taught how to sing and perform like the musician, that after Lavigne's death her record company buried the news and replaced her with "Melissa Vandella" for a continued profit, and that "Melissa" recorded all of Lavigne's future work. Much of the evidence cited in support of the conspiracy theory is the purported appearance and disappearance of various moles and other skin blemishes in pictures of Lavigne over time, as well as a promotional photoshoot in which she has the name "Melissa" written on her hand.

The conspiracy theory soon gained traction on Internet forums such as ATRL and Godlike Productions, where self-proclaimed "Avril Rangers" shared evidence. One ATRL post in 2012 suggested that the original Avril may actually be alive, using a picture of what appeared to be the singer buying cheese at a time when "new Avril" was supposedly battling Lyme disease. In addition to the changes in her appearance, the theory alleges that the title and artwork for her second album, Under My Skin, and the lyrics of songs like "My Happy Ending", "Together", and "The Best Years of Our Lives" by Evan Taubenfeld are subliminal messaging. The original blog further suggests that Melissa feels guilt over "participating in this farce", leading to the subliminal messaging.

== Rise in popularity ==
The theory began to gain traction in the United States in October 2015, when BuzzFeed reporter Ryan Broderick tweeted about Avril Está Morta. In a BuzzFeed post, Broderick cleared up his tweet on the matter, mentioning that the opening line of the original blog post admits that the theory is a hoax, and that "This blog was created to show how conspiracy theories can look true."

The death hoax saw increased prevalence in May 2017, when a high school student posted a Twitter thread alleging that Lavigne had died and been replaced in late 2003. The thread, which was retweeted over 250,000 times, cited discrepancies in the singer's face, fashion style, and handwriting as evidence of her death and replacement. The Twitter thread largely corresponds with the earlier Avril Está Morta conspiracy, except that it asserts that Under My Skin was created using pre-existing recordings of the real Lavigne.

The Twitter thread inspired an Internet meme in which users would say that a celebrity or fictional character died and was replaced, showing two pictures of the figure in question and titling it "a conspiracy theory thread".

== Response ==
The first time Lavigne was asked about the rumours was in 2014 during an interview for the Brazilian TV show Pânico na Band, during The Avril Lavigne Tour. Lavigne was asked if she had heard about online rumours claiming she "had died and was replaced by a clone", to which she replied by saying that the first time she was hearing about it was in this interview, and later added, "Well, I'm here, and I'm here in Brazil". In a video of the interview uploaded to the official YouTube channel of the TV show, it's possible to see images of the blog page Avril Está Morta responsible for starting the rumours. After the theory resurfaced globally in 2017, Lavigne addressed the rumours in a November 2017 Facebook live stream Q&A, when a fan asked whether she was dead, to which Lavigne responded, "No, I'm not dead. I'm here." She went on to say that the theory was spawned because "people are just bored and need something to talk about". The question was broached again in a November 2018 interview with Australia's KIIS 106.5. When asked about the theory, the singer responded, "Some people think that I'm not the real me, which is so weird! Like, why would they even think that?"

Radio hosts Kyle and Jackie O said that Lavigne "never actually flat out denied" that she had been replaced, and suggested that technological difficulties during the interview were a suspicious coincidence. In a 2019 interview with Entertainment Weekly, Lavigne addressed the theory directly, calling it a "dumb internet rumor" and saying that she was "flabbergasted that people bought into it". Lavigne addressed the rumour once again in a 2022 interview for Galore Magazine, stating "So it's funny because everyone says I look the same, but then there's that. That doesn't make any sense. Also, how random? When people bring it up, and it's been brought up to me for like, years, that there's this conspiracy theory that I'm not me or something? I'm a clone? How did something like that get so—I don't know, it's just the weirdest rumour." The creator of the blog that originated the Avril Está Morta conspiracy has apologized and changed the whole blog post to state that Avril has not died, and that the blog was a way of showing how conspiracy theories may seem true.

== See also ==
- Paul is dead, a similar conspiracy theory involving Paul McCartney
- Melania Trump replacement conspiracy theory
