= Melania Trump replacement conspiracy theory =

Body double theory

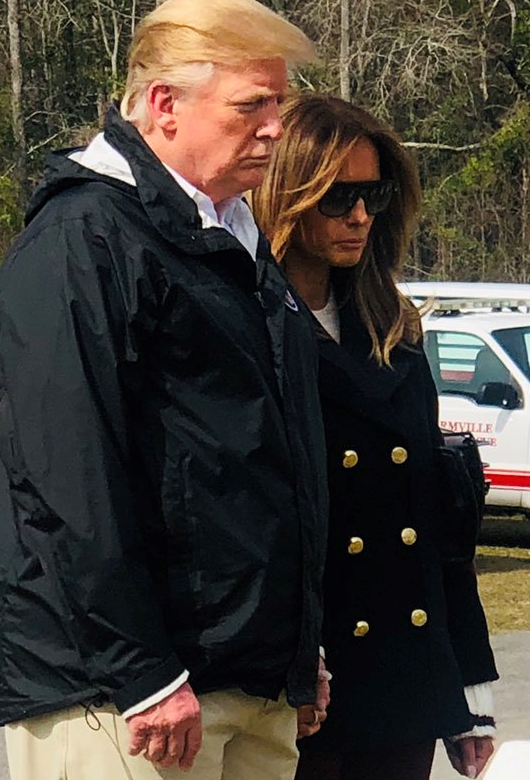
Donald and Melania Trump in Alabama, March 2018. The TV show The View had a segment on "a surge of internet chatter about the former fashion model's Alabama appearance under the #fakeMelania hashtag", relaying the belief that the woman pictured here was not the real Melania.

In 2017, a theory began that Melania Trump, the first lady of the United States, was replaced, or was sometimes replaced, by a body double, and that the "real" Melania was refusing to attend occasional events, or had exited from public life entirely. Supporters of the theory allege physical differences in facial features, bodily dimensions, or behavior between the original and supposed "replacement" Melania, and changes in President Donald Trump's language in referring to Melania.

Theories arose at several periods during Trump's presidency, particularly in October 2017, May–June 2018, March 2019, and October 2020. Trump himself addressed the theory through tweets and in comments to reporters, denouncing it as false and "fake news".

Some mainstream media sources labelled the theory false, with some labelling it "a ridiculous conspiracy theory" and "a non-story". Vox described the theory as conforming to various narratives surrounding the First Lady, which "[paint] Melania as either unwilling to be part of the administration or as someone who hates her husband so much that she’s found a body double to stand in".

== Origins ==
In 2017, The Guardian columnist Marina Hyde claimed to have inadvertently launched the theory, tweeting "Absolutely convinced Melania is being played by an impersonator. Theory: she left him weeks ago" on October 13. However, Business Insider referenced tweets speculating about a body double from the month before Hyde tweeted. A Facebook post by actress Andrea Wagner Barton, also published on October 13 in support of the theory, was shared nearly 100,000 times.

Social media posts discussing the theory noted a photograph in which Melania looked very similar to a woman pictured next to her, apparently a Secret Service agent, while other posts highlighted that Trump referred aloud to "my wife, Melania, who happens to be right here".

On May 14, 2018, Melania reportedly underwent an embolization, a minimally invasive procedure that deliberately blocks a blood vessel in order to treat a benign kidney condition. The procedure was reportedly successful and performed without complications. During this period, Melania was not seen in public for five weeks, with the White House also refusing to comment on her absence for most of this period, generating further theories. In one instance, when asked about Melania, Trump told pool reporters that she was watching them from a window, pointing to the window in question, which was clearly empty. Following Melania's reported return to the White House following surgery, Trump tweeted a welcome which misspelled her name as "Melanie".

An alternative theory regarding Melania's public appearances, posited following her time spent recovering from surgery, was that Melania had plastic surgery, possibly a facelift or breast enlargement, resulting in her appearing different.

== Resurgences ==
The body double theory arose again in July 2018, stemming from images of Melania exiting Air Force One in Brussels. The theory was raised again in 2019 following a Trump visit to an Alabama tornado site. The TV show The View had a segment on "a surge of internet chatter about the former fashion model’s Alabama appearance under the #fakeMelania hashtag."

The theory resurfaced again in October 2020, with observers finding differences between Melania and the woman who accompanied Trump to the final presidential debate. Director Zack Bornstein tweeted: "The only thing I'll miss from this administration is them swapping in new Melanias and just pretending we won't notice like a 4-year-old with a guppy." Former White House Communications Director Anthony Scaramucci seemed to confirm the rumor while a guest on Have You Been Paying Attention?, stating "You know Michael Cohen, the President’s lawyer, insists that there is a body double and insists that actually her sister sometimes replaces her on the campaign trail... Usually when you see somebody more affectionate with Mr. Trump."

The theory again arose on election night in 2024, when many reported believing that the woman Trump showed up to vote with, who wore sunglasses to the voting booth, was not Melania.

== Response ==
Following his trip to Alabama in March 2018, Donald Trump tweeted that "the Fake News photoshopped pictures of Melania propelled conspiracy theories that it’s actually not her by my side in Alabama and other places." Trump gave no evidence of any photoshopped pictures. Melania's spokeswoman called the segment on The View "shameful" and "beyond petty".

One scholar, University of Pennsylvania history professor Sophia Rosenfeld, noted that the conspiracy theory of Melania's replacement follows a long line of similar claims of noted figures: "Pornographic libelles featuring a sex-obsessed Marie-Antoinette in the years before the French Revolution are simply the ancestors of today's 'news stories' claiming Michelle Obama or Melania Trump is actually a man, or a body double, or a lesbian, or anything else salacious."

=== Parodies ===
- Late night talk show host Stephen Colbert parodied the theory on his show The Late Show with Stephen Colbert by having both actresses Laura Benanti and Christine Baranski appear on his show as Melania impersonators in 2019.
- In October 2020, Seth Meyers parodied the theory on his show Late Night with Seth Meyers by having Amber Ruffin portray a Melania impersonator.
- Tracey Ullman's comedy series Tracey Breaks the News parodied the theory with several episodes in which Melania Trump (Carlotta Morelli) is actually a robot created and controlled by the Russian government.

== See also ==
- Avril Lavigne replacement conspiracy theory
- List of conspiracy theories promoted by Donald Trump
- Paul is dead
- Public image of Melania Trump
- BlueAnon
