= Jennifer Rubell =

American conceptual artist (born 1970)

- Born: 1970 (age 55–56)
- Website: jenniferrubell.com

Jennifer Rubell (born 1970) is an American conceptual artist known for her participatory sculpture, video, and food performances. Rubell has held performances and exhibitions at Foundation Beyeler in Riehen, Switzerland, the Los Angeles County Museum of Art, Performa, Dallas Contemporary, The Power Plant Contemporary Art Gallery in Toronto, Saatchi Gallery in London, and the Brooklyn Museum. Rubell lives and works in New York City.

== Early life and education ==
Rubell was born in New York City to art collectors Donald and Mera Rubell, the founders of the Rubell Museum. She is the niece of American entrepreneur Steve Rubell. Rubell attended Public School 6 and the Horace Mann School and later earned a B.A. in Fine Arts from Harvard University. She also studied at the Culinary Institute of America. When she was 19, Rubell worked as a studio intern for artist Jeff Koons.

== Work ==
=== Food performances ===
Rubell is perhaps best known for her food performances. Each year since 2002, Rubell puts on an interactive food performance at the Rubell Family Collection in Miami during Art Basel Miami Beach. These performances range from works such as Faith from 2013 which consisted of a large seesaw covered in egg tarts that teetered back and forth as visitors consumed the pastries to Incubation from 2011 in which nursemaids cultured yogurt in a glass booth. Visitors were handed jars of yogurt through a slot in the window and added sweetness by catching honey the dripped from the ceiling. Rubell has also staged food performances at Performa, the New York performance art festival.

=== Brad Jones ===
Brad Jones is a fictional artist created by Jennifer Rubell and painter Brandi Twilley. The character of Brad Jones is meant to be "the next up-and-coming, New York-based male art star to take the art world by storm." Rubell initially conceived of a project in which she posed nude for a number of male painters all at once, "a kind of painting gang-bang." When Twilley responded to her call for painters, however, the project changed. Rubell posed for Twilley two hours a day, three days a week and the resulting diptychs were exhibited under the name Brad Jones. In 2015, Rubell exhibited another group of paintings made with Twilley in which Rubell posed nude while astride a horse. The paintings were accompanied by video of Rubell while she was being painted. The video was screened in small room and viewers were asked to enter one at a time, lock the door, and remove their clothes while viewing it.

=== Other work ===
Rubell's other work mainly takes the form of interactive sculpture. Examples include, Us, a glass sculpture of a baby that viewers are entrusted to hold and Portrait of the Artist, a twenty-four-foot long sculpture of Rubell made from 3D scans of her body taken while she was eight months pregnant. The belly of the figure is hollowed out and viewers are invited to climb inside. Other notable works include, Lysa III and Engagement, a wax replica of Prince William made the year after the prince's engagement to Kate Middleton. The sculpture has an attached replica of the royal engagement ring and viewers are asked to slip their hand through the figure's arm with their finger through the ring. Lysa III is a large female mannequin that crushes walnuts between her upper thighs.

Rubell's art exhibition Ivanka Vacuuming featured a model resembling Ivanka Trump vacuuming crumbs thrown by spectators. The exhibition was sponsored by CulturalDC and hosted by Washington, D.C.'s Flashpoint Gallery in February 2019. Ivanka Trump herself tweeted regarding the exhibit, "Women can choose to knock each other down or build each other up. I choose the latter." Donald Trump Jr. tweeted regarding it, "Sad, but not surprising to watch self professed “feminists” launching sexist attacks against @IvankaTrump. In their crazed world, sexism is OK if hurts their political enemies. That's ok, they can go put on their stupid hats & she’ll get back to actually fighting for women."
