= Monika Bravo =

Colombian artist (born 1964)

- Born: 1964 (age 61–62); Bogota, Colombia
- Known for: Synchronicity
- Movement: Automythography

Monika Bravo (born 1964) is a multi-disciplinary artist born in Bogotá, Colombia, who lives and works in New York City, New York. Her work has been internationally exhibited, including at Stenersen Museum in Oslo; Seoul's International Biennial of New Media Art; Bank of the Republic in Bogotá; New Museum and El Museo del Barrio in New York City and Site Santa Fe. Her work has received acclaim including a 1999 New York Times review which called her piece Synchronicity (from a group exhibition at El Museo del Barrio) a "standout...small, beautifully blurry video images of boats plowing through New York Harbor..."

In 1982, Bravo left Bogotá, moving to Rome to study fashion design, which she continued in Paris at Esmod, before traveling to London to study photography. In 1994 she moved to New York where she is currently still based.

== Career ==
Among Bravo's most well-known artworks is September 10, 2001, Uno Nunca Muere La Vispera dedicated to artist Michael Richards who died in Tower One on the morning of the September 11 attacks. In summer 2001 Bravo was an artist-in-residence in the Lower Manhattan Cultural Council's World Views program. As described in a 2006 book:

On September 10, she spent more than six hours making time-lapse exposures of the boats below, the bridges, and an advancing storm that sent lightning through the night sky, illuminated Tower Two. Around midnight, Bravo gathered her tapes and bid Richards "Good night" as he watched the end of the Giants-Broncos game on Monday Night Football; he had chosen to remain there through morning. Her footage, shown in small venues and on the Internet, would be the last previous glimpse of how those who lived and worked and dreamed in the towers had regarded the city below them.

In 2010, Bravo was one of four winning artists in New York City's "urbancanvas" design competition with her work "Breathing Wall UC".

Most recently Bravo Represented the Vatican City in the Pavilion of the Holy See at the 56th International Art Exhibition of the Venice Biennial with her work "ARCHE-TYPES: The sound of the word is beyond sense". With this new work, she continues with her interest in coding/decoding information, the interest in the language of abstraction and an ongoing pursuit to decipher reality by means of perception. She created a parallel between the prologue of the Gospel of John In the Beginning..., (given to her by the curator of the Pavilion, Micol Forti), Malevich’s ideas behind Suprematism* and the definition of Zaum by the avant garde Poet Aleksei Kruchenykh**.

Among her most recent exhibitions are Waterweavers curated by José Roca and Alejandro Martín, Art Museum of the Americas, Washington DC 2015, Centro Conde Duque, Madrid 2015 and Bard Graduate Center, New York 2014; Theorem. You Simply Destroy the Image I Always Had of Myself curated by Octavio Zaya, MANA Contemporary, Jersey City NJ 2015; Landscape of Belief (solo), Y Gallery, New York 2015; Affective Architectures, Aluna Art Foundation, Miami FL 2014; URUMU (solo), NC-Arte, Bogotá 2014; Common Ground: Earth, Borusan Contemporary, Istanbul 2014.

== Public art ==
- "Breathing_Wall_UC", installation, City Point, Brooklyn
- "AN INTERVAL OF TIME_UTA _ COMMISSION", Landmarks Public Art Program, University of Texas at Austin has commissioned a time-based installation for their public art collection
- "AKA_H2O, A panoramic video installation of flowing water and nature scenes by artist Monika Bravo, is projected across a 60-foot wall creating a visually stimulating ambiance.

== Selected exhibitions ==
- "Urumu" (February 1 - March 29, 2014), NC-arte, Bogotá, Colombia
- "Monika Bravo: New Work" (September 22, 2013 – May 4, 2014), Montclair Art Museum, Montclair, New Jersey, United States
- "Solo Projects LABORATORIUM -ARTBO", Y GALLERY, curated by Jose Roca, (Oct. 17 2013, Bogota)
- "Monika Bravo: Landscape(s) of Belief" (September 6, 2013 – March 15, 2014), Brigham Young University Museum of Art, Provo, Utah, United States
- "The Storytellers: Narratives in International Contemporary Art" (August 30 - November 4, 2012), Stenersen Museum, Oslo, Norway
- "Paladar in Third Streaming" (October 24, 2012), Third Streaming, New York City, New York, United States
- "Tracing the Unseen Border" (April 21 - May 22, 2011), La Mama La Galleria, New York City, New York, United States
- "'Tawkin' New Yawk City Walls" (2005), Hillwood Estate, Museum & Gardens, Washington, D.C., United States
- "Frequency + Repetition" (January 13 - February 26, 2005), Bryce Wolkowitz Gallery, New York City, New York, United States
- "Playing with Time" (September 28, 2002 – January 25, 2003), SITE Santa Fe, Santa Fe, New Mexico, United States
- "A_Maze" (April 26 - May 25, 2002), De Chiara Gallery, New York City, New York, United States
- "World Views: Open Studio Exhibition" (December 1, 2001 – January 13, 2002), New Museum, New York City, New York, United States
- "The S-Files" (1999), El Museo del Barrio, New York City, New York, United States

== Publications ==
- Monika Bravo, Gabriel Cure, Juan Luque (ed.), Gabriel Cure Lemaitre La Arquitectura del Detalle, Two Leaves Editions 2012
- Ricardo Cisneros, Between Two Worlds, Two Leaves Editions 2011 (Design by Monika Bravo)
- Stephan Apicella-Hitchcock, Naomi Ben-Shahar, Monika Bravo, Patty Chang, Site Matters: The Lower Manhattan Cultural Council's World Trade Center Artist Residency 1997–2001, LMCC 2004
