= December 1967 =

Month of 1967

<<	December 1967					>>
Su	Mo	Tu	We	Th	Fr	Sa
					1	2
3	4	5	6	7	8	9
10	11	12	13	14	15	16
17	18	19	20	21	22	23
24	25	26	27	28	29	30
31

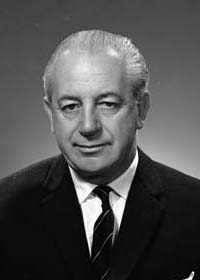
December 17, 1967: Prime Minister of Australia Harold Holt vanishes while swimming

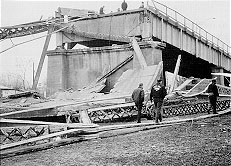
December 15, 1967: 46 people killed in collapse of West Virginia and Ohio's Silver Bridge

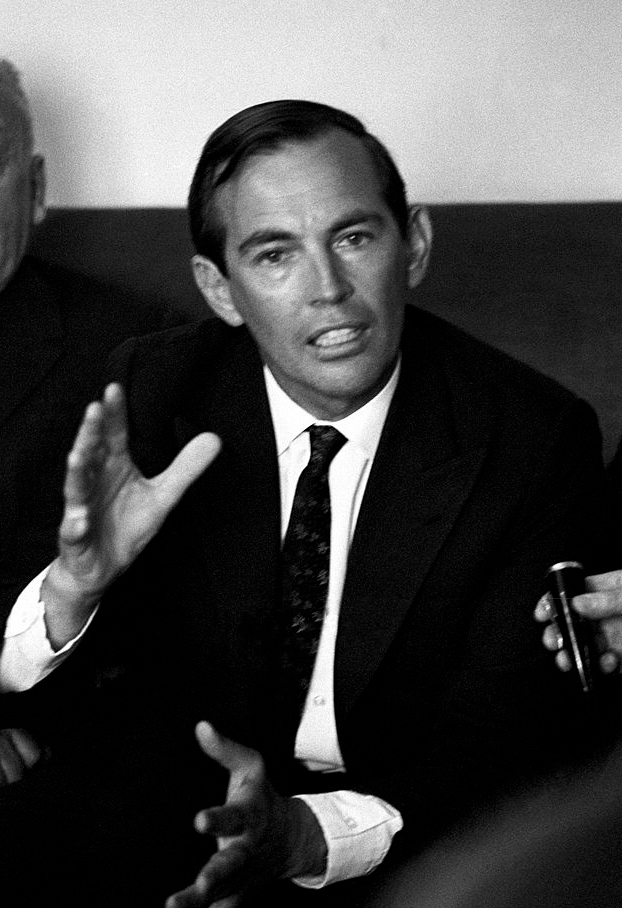
December 3, 1967: Dr. Christiaan Barnard performs first human heart transplant

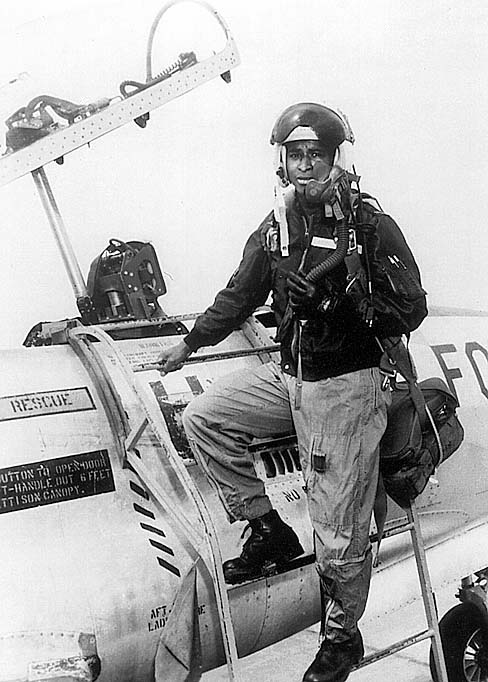
December 8, 1967: USAF Major Robert H. Lawrence, Black astronaut, killed in F-104 crash

The following events occurred in December 1967:

== December 1, 1967 (Friday) ==
- Georgia's Governor Lester Maddox gave an early release to 547 state prisoners — almost seven percent— so that the inmates could be with their families in time for Christmas. At the time, the number of adults and juveniles behind bars in the state was less than 8,000 and the 547 given the early reprieve had good conduct records and less than three months remaining on their sentences. Over a period of 50 years, the state prison population would be seven times higher, rising from 8,000 to more than 56,000.
- NASA presented the Apollo Telescope Mount (ATM) program to the Astronomy Missions Board at Cambridge, Massachusetts. The Board recommended an early crew assignment for ATM, so that adequate training in solar physics could be provided, and also recommended that scientist astronauts be assigned as members of the ATM flight crew.
- The Jimi Hendrix Experience released their second album, Axis: Bold as Love. In 1994, Guitarist magazine would list the work as the seventh "most influential guitar album of all time" (with the band's debut album, Are You Experienced, at number one).
- The nations of Kenya, Tanzania and Uganda formally inaugurated the East African Community.

== December 2, 1967 (Saturday) ==
- Full-time colour television programming began in the United Kingdom as BBC-2, which had inaugurated the service with a test broadcast from Wimbledon on July 1, showed its entire evening lineup in color starting at 6:30 in the evening with Billy Smart's Circus.
- Denise Darvall, a 25-year-old bank employee in Cape Town, South Africa, became the first heart donor in history when she was fatally injured by a drunk driver. Denise and her mother had stopped to pick up a cake from the Wrensch Street Bakery in the Cape Town suburb of Salt River, and were walking across Main Road at 3:40 in the afternoon; Myrtle Darvall was killed instantly; Denise was rushed to the nearby Groote Schuur Hospital in critical condition with a fractured skull. Despite having lost both his wife and daughter, Edward Darvall gave consent to Dr. Christiaan Barnard to have Denise's heart transplanted into a seriously ill patient, and surgery started shortly after midnight.
- Perry Wallace became the first African-American athlete to compete in basketball for a college in the all-white Southeastern Conference (SEC), as the Vanderbilt University Commodores basketball team opened its season with an 88 to 84 overtime win against Southern Methodist University (SMU) in Dallas. Wallace had eight points and 10 rebounds in his opening game.
- Malaysia became the first nation to introduce a trapezoidal postage stamp. The stamp was issued to commemorate the 100th anniversary of the first stamps issued for the Straits Settlements in 1867.
- The 20th Century Limited, which billed itself at one time as "The Greatest Train in the World", made its final run for New York Central Railroad from Chicago to New York City.
- Albert Bernard Bongo was sworn in as the second President of Gabon.
- Died: Cardinal Francis Spellman, 78, Roman Catholic Archbishop of New York since 1939

== December 3, 1967 (Sunday) ==
- Christiaan Barnard and a team of surgeons carried out the world's first heart transplant, at Groote Schuur Hospital in Cape Town, South Africa. At 2:20 in the morning, local time, Denise Darvall's heart was removed from her chest, then rushed over to the operating room where 14 surgeons and nurses were ready to transplant it into retired grocer Louis Washkansky. Barnard then removed Washkansky's ailing heart, and Dr. Rodney Hewitson then placed Darvall's heart into Washkansky's chest; Barnard then worked at shaping the aorta, and, at 5:24, connected the new heart. At 5:43, blood was released into the heart muscle, and, at 6:45, the new heart was beating on its own.
- Greece and Turkey announced their agreement to UN Secretary General U Thant's request, mediated by Cyrus Vance of the United States, to withdraw their troops from Cyprus and that they would dismantle paramilitary forces on the island. Cyprus agreed the next day to the proposal; Greece returned its troop levels to the limits specified in agreements in 1960, and "Turkey canceled large-scale preparations for an invasion", bringing an end to the crisis that had started on November 15.
- Forty-two people were injured while riding on one of San Francisco's famed cable cars. The car was traveling in a driving rain on Hyde Street when the grip that held the car steady slipped, sending the vehicle hurtling down the steep hill. After ramming an automobile at the intersection with Bay Street, the car continued until stopping at North Point Street near Fisherman's Wharf. The automobile, which had caught fire, rolled down Hyde Street and struck eight other vehicles.
- Thirty-two people, most of them Thai university students who were on vacation during the birthday of the King, drowned in the sinking of a small river craft in the Gulf of Siam off the coast of the Rayong Province. Another 58 students and the pilot of the craft swam to shore or were rescued by fishing boats from the village of Ban Phe. The pilot was arrested upon arrival on land.
- An Arab terrorist group cut the main railway line between Jerusalem and Tel Aviv, with an explosive charge near Beth Shemesh, 15 miles (24 km) west of Jerusalem. Two of the saboteurs were killed in the blast.
- The government of Iraq revoked the licenses of all 12 of the nation's daily newspapers as a new press law went into effect.

== December 4, 1967 (Monday) ==
- At 6:50 p.m., a volcano erupted on Deception Island, one of the South Shetland Islands of Antarctica. The dispute over whether the island was owned by Chile, Argentina or the United Kingdom was put aside as the research bases of all three nations were wrecked by the shower of rocks and ash. The scientists of the Argentinian and Chilean stations near Telefon Bay were moved to the British base. The next day, the Chilean Navy icebreaker Piloto Parda evacuated 20 Britons and 27 Chileans while the Argentine Navy evacuated 14 Argentine scientists to the Bahia Aruirre. The eruption came without warning, and there had been no volcanic disturbances on Deception Island for more than 120 years; notably, the penguins and skua gulls native to the island had fled the island in advance, leading a writer to note that "Those birds, often called the dumbest in the world, had sense enough to leave their rookeries on Deception Island four hours before the trained scientists on the island felt the first earth tremor."
- The Poor People's Campaign was announced by Martin Luther King Jr. at a meeting of the Southern Christian Leadership Conference, with an objective to call attention to, and bring an end to, poverty among White, Hispanic, Native American and African American people in the United States. King would be assassinated on April 4, 1968, and not live to see the protest campaign's scheduled launch on May 12.
- A bridge collapse killed 21 construction workers near Mexico City. The center section of the Universidad Anahuac bridge gave way without warning and plunged into the 550-foot (170 m) deep Loma del Negro Canyon. Twelve workers had been on the span outside of Tecamachalco when it gave way, and another 50 had been working below.
- The U.S. Department of State sent a diplomatic note to Cambodia's ruler, Prince Norodom Sihanouk, pledging that the U.S. would not cross into Cambodia to pursue North Vietnamese and Viet Cong forces fleeing from South Vietnam, and promising to respect "Cambodian neutrality, sovereignty, independence and territorial integrity."
- The U.S. Army's 9th Infantry Division riverine force and 400 South Vietnamese forces engaged Viet Cong troops in the Mekong Delta, and killed 235 of the 300-strong Viet Cong battalion.
- The Federal Rules of Appellate Procedure were promulgated by order of the Supreme Court of the United States.
- Robert F. Thompson, Assistant Manager of Manned Spacecraft Center (MSC)'s Apollo Applications Program Office since its establishment in July 1966, was promoted to Manager, a position that had been vacant since April when MSC Deputy Director George M. Low had been moved to the Apollo Spacecraft Program Office.
- Died:
  - Harry Wismer, 56, American broadcaster who had been the founder of the New York Titans (later the New York Jets) pro football team, died several hours after he fractured his skull when he fell down the steps of a restaurant.
  - Daniel Jones, 86, British linguist and specialist in phonetics who authored the first comprehensive work on uniform pronunciation, An Outline of English Phonetics.
  - Bert Lahr, 72, American stage and film actor, best known for his 1939 role as the Cowardly Lion in The Wizard of Oz

== December 5, 1967 (Tuesday) ==
- Canada's Royal Commission on Bilingualism and Biculturalism, colloquially called "the Bi & Bi Commission", issued its final report after more than four years of study, setting recommendations for both English and French to be the official languages of Canada, and for bilingualism in portions of Canada with large French Canadian populations. Sometimes called the Laurendeau—Dunton Commission for its co-chairmen, Montreal newspaper publisher André Laurendeau and Carleton University president Davidson Dunton, the group published a 212-page report advising that New Brunswick and Ontario join Quebec in giving official recognition of French, and identifying specific "bilingual districts" where reform should take place. New Brunswick would become "Canada's only officially bilingual province", since French and English had long been used unofficially in Quebec politics, and Ontario declined to amend its laws. Of 54 districts identified by the commission, those with the largest percentage of French speakers in each province were Prince County, Prince Edward Island (16.3%); Bonnyville, Alberta (18.1%), Assiniboia, Saskatchewan (18.3%); Division No. 1, Manitoba (31.1%); Richmond, Nova Scotia (46.7%); Pontiac, Quebec (55%); Russell, Ontario (77.4%); and Madawaska County, New Brunswick (94%), while none were designated in Newfoundland and Labrador or British Columbia.
- Dr. Benjamin Spock, known to millions as the author of the bestselling guide to parenting, The Common Sense Book of Baby and Child Care, was among 263 antiwar protesters who were arrested for occupying the Whitehall induction center in New York City. Spock and poet Allen Ginsberg led a group of 1,000 demonstrators on the second day of the most recent Stop the Draft Week events.
- The Đắk Sơn massacre was carried out by Viet Cong guerrillas, killing 252 Montagnard men, women and children in the Đắk Lắk province of South Vietnam.
- U.S. President Lyndon Johnson met at the White House with Secretary of Defense Robert McNamara, Vice President Hubert Humphrey, Secretary of State Dean Rusk, Cyrus Vance, CIA Director Richard Helms and Walt Rostow to discuss the Vietnam War. The particular topics that were discussed included possible United Nations action regarding the conflict and Viet Cong sanctuaries in both Laos and Cambodia.

== December 6, 1967 (Wednesday) ==
- The United States ratified the Supplementary Convention on the Abolition of Slavery, eleven years after it had been approved by the United Nations on September 7, 1956. The supplement expanded upon the definition of slavery in the 1926 Slavery Convention and committed nations to outlawing debt bondage, serfdom, the sale of a minor by a parent or guardian to another person for forced labor, and the sale, transfer or bequest of a married woman to a purchaser.
- Three days after the first human heart transplant, Dr. Adrian Kantrowitz and a team of surgeons at the Maimonides Medical Center in Brooklyn, New York, performed the second heart transplant, the first in the United States and the first to a pediatric patient. Jamie Scudero, less than three weeks old and dying of tricuspid atresia, was given the heart of an anencephalic baby. Scudero initially appeared to do well but died seven hours after surgery had been completed.
- Born:
  - Hacken Lee (stage name for Li Keqin), Hong Kong-born actor; in British Hong Kong
  - Judd Apatow, American television and film producer; in Flushing, Queens
- Died:
  - Clement Maggia, 74, Italian-born American pastry chef who had catered events for the White House since 1920, and for dignitaries at The Greenbrier, died shortly after completing the wedding cake for the President's daughter, Lynda Bird Johnson. Maggia was celebrating with dinner at a restaurant when he suffered a heart attack, and his death came only 16 days after that of White House chef Ferdinand Louvat.
  - Oscar Gestido, 66, President of Uruguay since March 1, suffered a fatal heart attack. His Vice President, Jorge Pacheco Areco, was sworn into office at 5:30 in the morning, four hours after Gestido's fatal heart attack.
  - Béla Schick, 90, Hungarian-born American pediatrician who had developed the Schick test for diphtheria

== December 7, 1967 (Thursday) ==
- Chile filed an appeal with the British government to settle the longstanding Beagle dispute with Argentina over possession of the Beagle Channel islands of Picton, Lennox and Nueva. The channel itself (named for Charles Darwin's ship HMS Beagle) was not part of the dispute. However, the channel was a demarcation line for a treaty signed by the two nations on July 23, 1881. With Tierra del Fuego as another marker, islands to the east were awarded to Argentina and islands to the west of Tierra del Fuego and south of the Beagle Channel were awarded to Chile; the United Kingdom was the agreed-upon arbitrator of the treaty. Since the disputed islands were in the Channel rather than to the south of it, both nations sought them. For nearly 10 years, the evidence would be presented to an international court (with judges from the UK, France, Nigeria, Sweden and the U.S.), which would award the islands to Chile on May 2, 1977; Argentina would finally agree to accept the decision in a treaty with Chile in 1985.
- The United Soccer Association merged with its rival, the National Professional Soccer League (NPSL) at the end of the first season for both leagues. The new entity, the 17-team North American Soccer League (NASL) would play for 17 seasons. The 10-team NPSL contributed six teams (the Atlanta Chiefs, the Baltimore Bays, the New York Generals, the Oakland Clippers, the St. Louis Stars and the Toronto Falcons) while the 12-team USA sent seven of its teams the Chicago Mustangs, the Cleveland Stokers, the Dallas Tornado, the Detroit Cougars, the Houston Stars, the Los Angeles Wolves and the Washington Whips, relocated its Chicago and Los Angeles teams (as the Kansas City Spurs and the San Diego Toros) and renamed its Boston and Vancouver franchises as the Boston Beacons and the Vancouver Royals.
- RAF Commodore John Blount, captain of the Queen's Flight that was responsible for air transport of Queen Elizabeth II and for the Prime Minister, was killed along with three other members of the squadron, when one of the Flight's helicopters, a Westland Whirlwind, lost a rotor blade while flying from RAF Benson to the Westland factory at Yeovil and crashed into a field at Brightwalton.
- The Apple Boutique, one of the first attempts by The Beatles to open a retail business, opened at 94 Baker Street in London to sell specially designed clothing and accessories. Because of shoplifting and poor management, the store would close on July 30, 1968, after less than eight months of operation.
- Three days before his accidental death, Otis Redding recorded the song that would become the number one best selling song in the United States, "(Sittin' On) The Dock of the Bay".
- Born: Tino Martinez, American baseball player; in Tampa, Florida
- Died: House Peters Sr., 67, British-born American silent film actor who was known as "The Star of a Thousand Emotions"

== December 8, 1967 (Friday) ==
- All 70 people on a Faucett Airlines plane were killed in a crash when the DC-4 impacted the 10,225 feet (3,117 m) high Cerro Carpish in the Andes while at an altitude of 10,220 feet (3,120 m), after which the burning wreckage tumbled 3,000 feet (910 m) below the summit. The plane had taken off from Huánuco en route to Lima, with a brief stop at Tingo María. By the time that rescuers arrived at the scene, they found that looters from Huánuco had taken clothes, money, rings and other possessions from the bodies of the victims.
- Soviet Communist Party Secretary Leonid Brezhnev concluded a two-day visit to Prague that had been made at the request of Czechoslovak Communist Party leader Antonín Novotný, who wanted Soviet support to end the discontent among the Czechoslovak party's leadership. Brezhnev, who reportedly had never liked Novotny, responded to the request with the Russian phrase "Eto vashe delo", meaning "That's your problem."
- Operation Yellowstone began in South Vietnam as the 2nd and 3rd divisions of the U.S. Army's 25th Infantry Division were deployed in the Tây Ninh province to locate and destroy Viet Cong installations. The operation would continue until February 24, with 137 U.S. soldiers killed and 1,083 wounded. Known enemy deaths were nine times as many, with 1,170 killed.
- The Army of the Republic of Vietnam (ARVN), South Vietnam's army, trapped two Viet Cong battalions in the Mekong Delta at the Kinh O Mon Canal in Chương Thiện province and killed 365 of the enemy in the biggest battle of 1967 in that area. The ARVN rangers and infantrymen lost 67 of their own men in the fight, which did not involve American troops.
- The Rolling Stones released their only psychedelic rock album, Their Satanic Majesties Request, in the UK; it would be released the next day in the U.S.; the original proposed title, "Her Satanic Majesty Requests", a parody of the directions on British passports that began with "Her Britannic Majesty's Secretary of State requests and requires" had been rejected by Decca Records.
- Magical Mystery Tour was released by The Beatles as a double extended play (EP) album, with a total of six songs from the television movie soundtrack of the same name, in the United Kingdom; the six songs had been side A of the long-playing album released in the United States on November 27.
- The INS Kalvari, India's first-ever submarine, was commissioned at the Soviet port of Riga (now in Latvia), under the command of Lt. Commander K. S. Subramanian.
- Born: Junkie XL (stage name for Antoniys Holkenberg), Dutch electronic musician; in Lichtenvoorde, Gelderland, Netherlands
- Died:
  - U.S. Marine Captain Donald Cook, 33, died of malaria after almost four years of captivity as a prisoner of war in a Viet Cong camp. Cook, whose remains would never be recovered, would posthumously be promoted to the rank of colonel and would be awarded the Medal of Honor for his heroism in providing medical care to his fellow prisoners during his captivity; the guided missile carrier USS Donald Cook would be named in his honor.
  - U.S. Air Force Major Robert H. Lawrence, 32, the first African American selected for astronaut training, was killed in the crash of an F-104 Starfighter at Edwards Air Force Base in California. It would be more than ten years before candidates other than white males were selected for the NASA space program; in 1983, Guion S. Bluford Jr. would become the first African American astronaut in space.

== December 9, 1967 (Saturday) ==
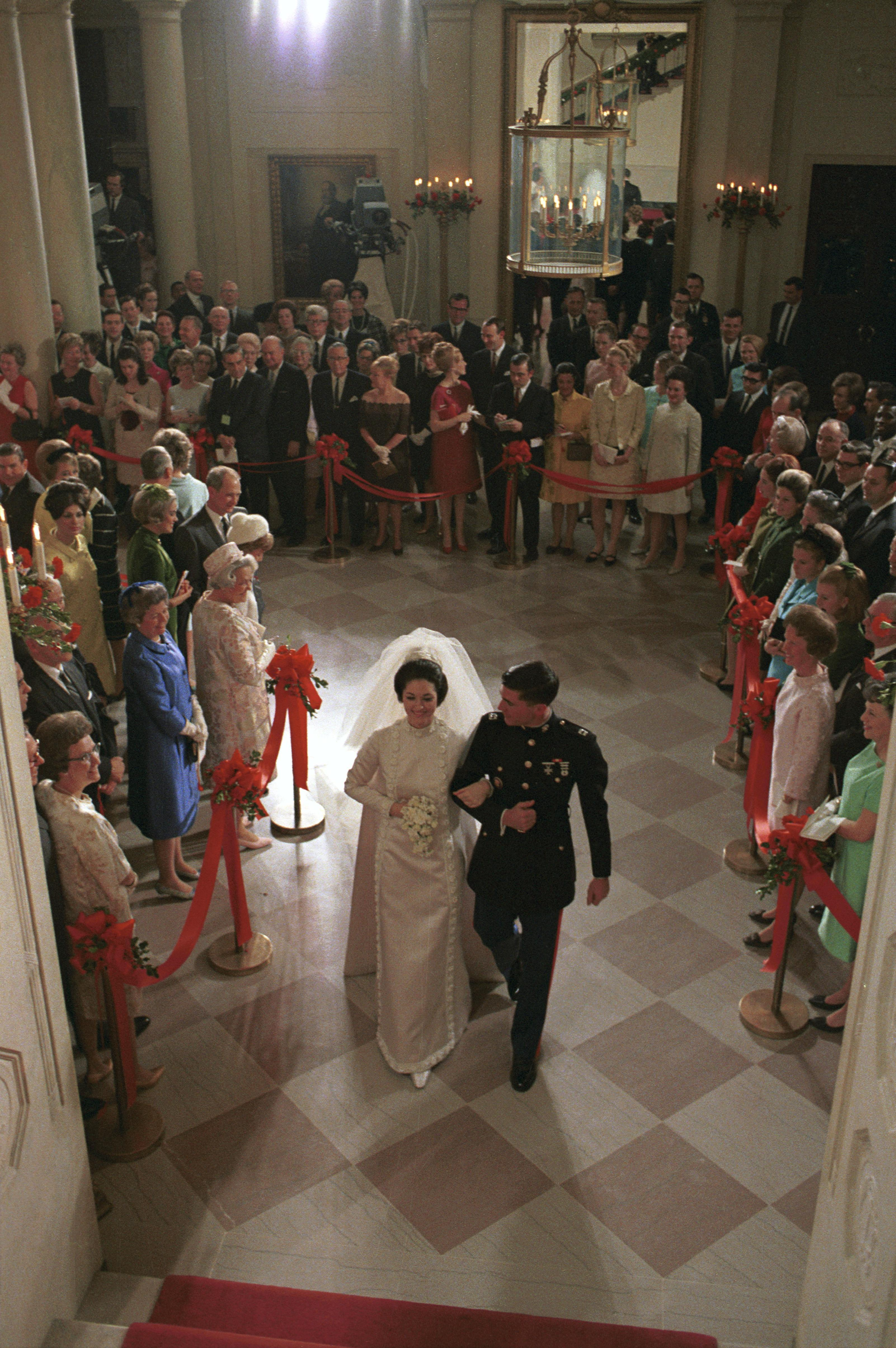
December 9, 1967: Lynda Johnson marries Charles Robb

- In one of the few wedding ceremonies held in the White House, Lynda Bird Johnson, daughter of U.S. President Lyndon Baines Johnson and First Lady Lady Bird Johnson, married future Virginia Governor Charles S. Robb.
- The RMS Queen Mary arrived at Long Beach, California at 11:00 in the morning, after a final voyage that had started from Southampton in England on October 31 and which had taken it around Cape Horn. Hundreds of small boats sailed with the mammoth ship on its way to the harbor, where one million people had gathered to see the liner's arrival at its permanent home. Passengers who had paid to be on the five-week trip complained afterward that it had been a miserable experience, and one member of the crew, an assistant chef, had died of a heat stroke during the summer weather in the Southern Hemisphere and had been buried at sea. The ship would be formally presented to the city of Long Beach two days later.
- Jim Morrison, the lead singer for The Doors, was arrested on stage in New Haven, Connecticut during a benefit concert for the New Haven College scholarship fund. Three journalists were taken to jail as well after attempting to get closer to the incident. Police charged Morrison with an "indecent and immoral exhibition" in the form of an angry speech that he gave to the crowd of 2,000 after interrupting a song; Morrison said that a policeman had fired pepper spray in the singer's eyes during an argument in the offstage dressing room, as well as breach of the peace and resisting an officer. Morrison was released after posting a $1,500 bond and would eventually pay a $25 fine.
- Hundreds of children and their parents in Evansville, Indiana were witness to a tragic end to the arrival of a shopping center Santa Claus in a Hughes 300 helicopter. "Santa" was set to land at 3:00 in the afternoon in the parking lot of the North Park Shopping Center in Evansville, and as many as 2,000 children had come to watch the event. The copter clipped three electrical power lines as it prepared to land, then crashed on pavement that had been cordoned off for landing, killing pilot William B. Dorr and William Bretz, a 59-year old tool and die maker at the city's Whirlpool Corporation factory.
- The capacity of some species of birds "to fly under conditions of low temperature and low oxygen pressure" was confirmed when a military aircraft checked out a radar station's report of an object at high altitude passing at low speed over Northern Ireland. The pilot reported that the cause was a flock of above 30 swans who were flying at an altitude of over 8,200 meters (26,900 feet or more than five miles). The air temperature was -48 °C (-54 °Fahrenheit) with a strong tailwind.
- Nicolae Ceaușescu, the Secretary-General of the Romanian Communist Party, was elected as the new President of Romania by unanimous vote of the nation's 451-member Grand National Assembly. Ceaușescu, who was already the de facto leader of the Communist nation, succeeded outgoing President Chivu Stoica. Ceaușescu would build a personality cult and become an increasingly brutal ruler until his overthrow and execution on December 25, 1989.
- Soviet Communist Party leader Leonid Brezhnev arrived in Prague after being asked by Czechoslovakia's President and party leader Antonín Novotný for assistance in dealing with a rebellion within the Czechoslovak Communist Party's Central Committee; Brezhnev would say later that the main cause of the problem was that "Novotny is incapable of cooperating with the comrades."
- Born: Joshua Bell, American violinist and conductor; in Bloomington, Indiana

== December 10, 1967 (Sunday) ==
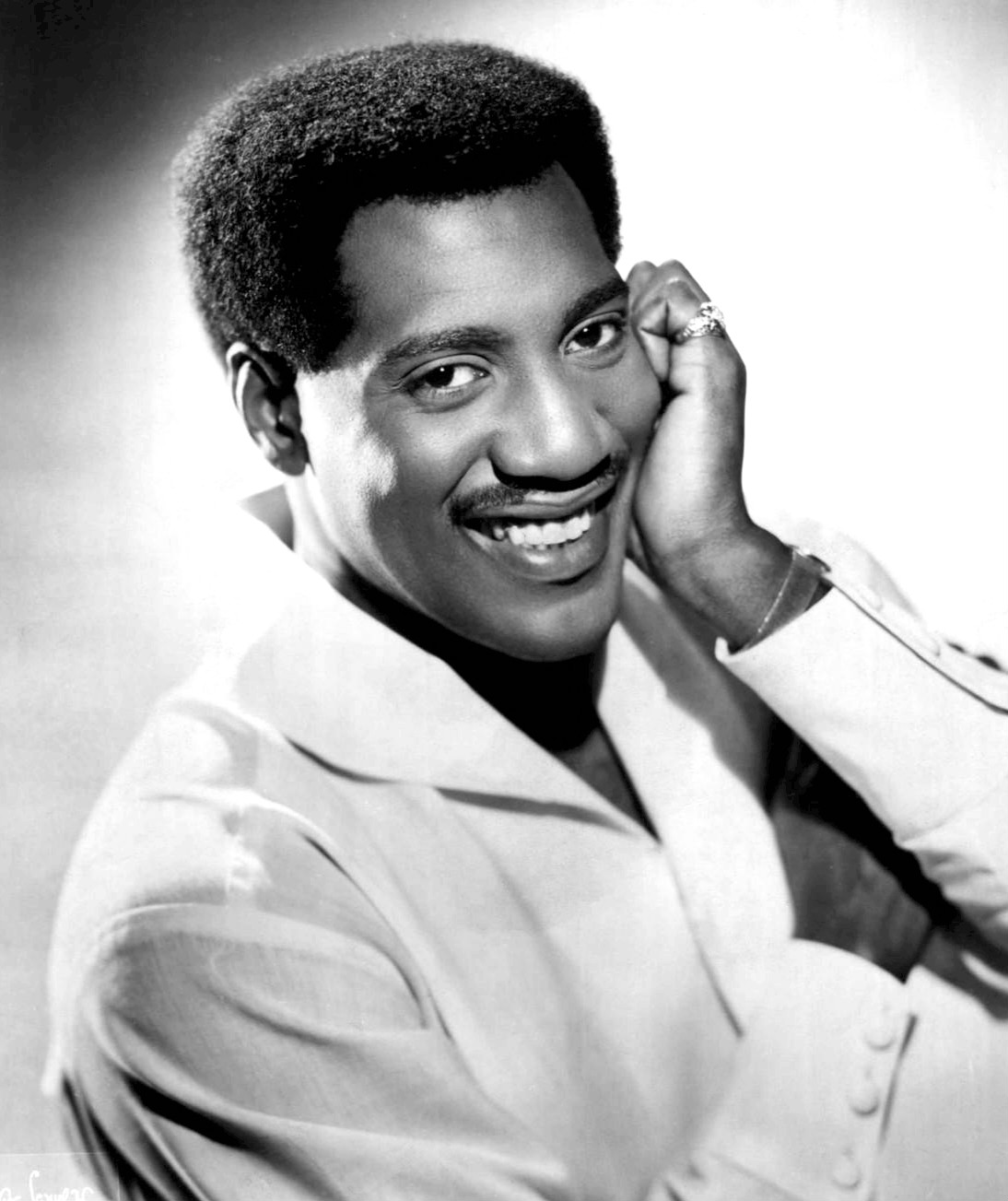
Redding

- R&B singer Otis Redding was killed at the age of 26, along with four other members of The Bar-Kays and a pilot when the plane he was on plunged into Lake Monona in Wisconsin at 3:25 in the afternoon. The twin-engine Beechcraft had been en route from Cleveland to a performance in Madison, Wisconsin, when it was lost in a fog. A seventh person on the plane, Ben Cauley, was able to swim to the lake shore. The others on the plane— Redding, Ron Caldwell, Phalin Jones, Carl Cunnngham, Matthew Kelly and pilot Richard Fraser— all drowned. Ironically, newspapers had reported that morning that the British music publication Melody Maker had listed Redding as the world's number one vocalist, displacing Elvis Presley after ten years.
- Project Gasbuggy, the first commercially sponsored nuclear test, took place near Bloomfield, New Mexico as part of Operation Plowshare, a government study of peaceful uses of the atomic bomb. The 29-kiloton explosion was "designed to improve natural gas extraction by fracturing rock formations" did provide greater gas flow but, as one author would comment later, "nobody would buy gas that might be contaminated with radioactivity".
- The Nobel Prize was presented at Stockholm by King Gustav VI Adolf of Sweden to physicist Hans A. Bethe and physicians Haldan K. Hartline, George Wald and Ragnar Granit. Other recipients were Guatemalan author Miguel Ángel Asturias, chemists Ronald Norrish, George Porter and Manfred Eigen. The Nobel Peace Prize was not awarded for 1967.
- CBS Studio 50 was renamed as the Ed Sullivan Theater, with New York City Mayor John Lindsay presiding over the rechristening ceremony and Ed Sullivan being escorted to the sound of Irish pipes into the building where he had hosted his variety show since 1953.

== December 11, 1967 (Monday) ==
- What would be called "the largest scientifically accepted triggered earthquake" took place at Koynanagar in India's Maharashtra state at 4:21 in the morning local time. The 6.3 magnitude tremor was traced to the pressures from the man-made Shivsagar Lake, a reservoir which had been created by the damming of the Koyna River. There were 180 people killed, and 2,272 injured in the collapse of buildings of stone or brick masonry.
- The first supersonic airliner, the French and British financed Concorde, was rolled out of a hangar in Toulouse for its first public appearance. The plane was designed to carry 130 passengers at speeds of up to Mach 2.2 (1,400 miles per hour (2,300 km/h)) and was originally set to make its first flight in February 1968. The plane would not be flown, however, until more than a year later, on March 2, 1969.

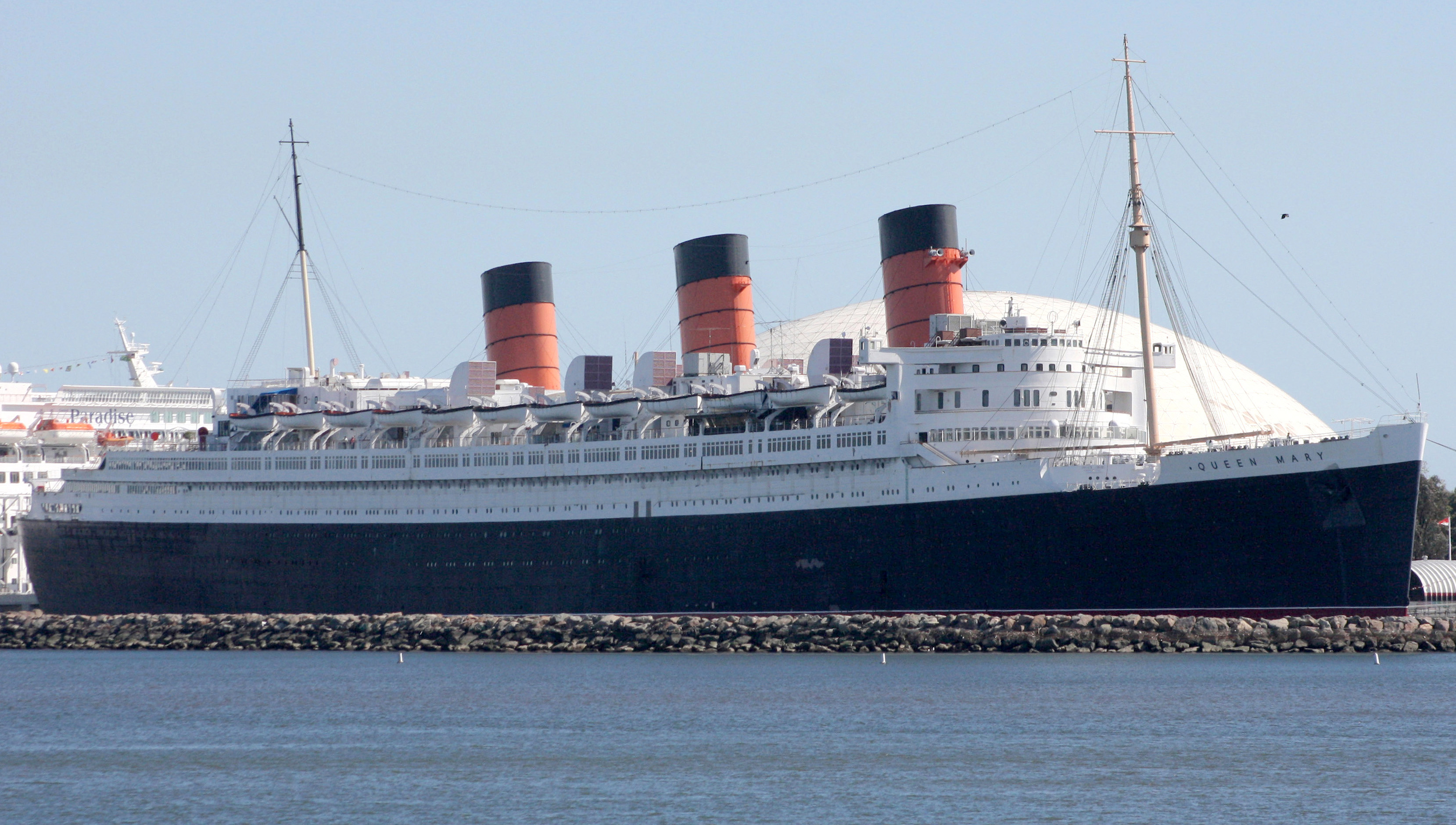
RMS Queen Mary in Long Beach

- Ownership of the RMS Queen Mary was formally transferred at a ceremony in Long Beach, California as Captain John Treasure Jones and Long Beach Mayor Edwin W. Wade signed a memorandum of delivery and acceptance. The city of Long Beach had purchased the ocean liner for renovation as a hotel, convention center and museum.
- Japan's Prime Minister, Eisaku Satō, announced what would be called "The Three Non-Nuclear Principles", declaring that Japan would not possess nuclear weapons, nor produce them, nor permit their entry into its territory.
- The Popular Front for the Liberation of Palestine was founded by George Habash, a Palestinian Christian who had been born in Lydda in British Palestine before it was annexed by Israel in 1948 and renamed Lod.
- Born: Mo'Nique (stage name for Monique Angela Imes), American TV actress and comedienne; in Baltimore

== December 12, 1967 (Tuesday) ==
- U.S. Senator Charles H. Percy of Illinois came under fire from Viet Cong mortars and small arms when he, his wife, and four other civilians made an unscheduled visit to the village of Dak Son, where the massacre of Montagnard civilians had been carried out by the Viet Cong guerrillas a week earlier. Senator Percy was not hurt by the attack, but did sustain cuts to his legs and arms while diving for cover; he and his party remained behind while his helicopter flew his wife back to the Song Be military base, and then waited to be rescued by four helicopter gunships.
- The nine-month jail sentence for Brian Jones, guitarist for The Rolling Stones, was set aside by order of Lord Parker of Waddington, the Lord Chief Justice of England and Wales following an appeal. Jones had been convicted of possession of marijuana, and Lord Parker concluded that Jones's history of depressive mental illness and the potential for suicide merited a lesser punishment of £1,000 ($2,400) and three years probation.
- The United Kingdom and the United Arab Republic (Egypt) resumed diplomatic relations more than two years after severing their ties during Rhodesia's proclamation of independence and Britain's decision not to intervene militarily.
- Born: John Randle, American NFL defensive tackle and member of the Pro Football Hall of Fame and the College Football Hall of Fame; in Mumford, Texas

== December 13, 1967 (Wednesday) ==
- King Constantine II of Greece attempted to lead a countercoup against the military junta that had controlled the government since April but "in seeking broad support from Greek political forces, had virtually announced his plans to the world" before setting off with his family, some of his aides, and Prime Minister Konstantinos Kollias to the northern military bases in Larissa and Kavala. The King, however, had misjudged support from the United States government, which had concluded that "considering the monarchy's record, the victory of the King would not signify the return to a legitimate and stable democratic system but a government manipulated by the Crown."
- The American space probe Pioneer 8 was launched into orbit around the Sun on the same Delta rocket that put a communications satellite into an orbit around the Earth, marking the first time that the United States had sent more than one payload into space on the same launch.
- Born:
  - Jamie Foxx (stage name for Eric Marlon Bishop), American film and television actor; in Terrell, Texas
  - Yūji Oda, Japanese singer and actor; in Kawasaki, Kanagawa
- Died: David Poleri, 40, American operatic tenor was killed in a helicopter crash along with his wife, while on a honeymoon in Hawaii on the island of Kauai. The Poleris had remarried three days earlier after having been divorced for more than a year.

== December 14, 1967 (Thursday) ==
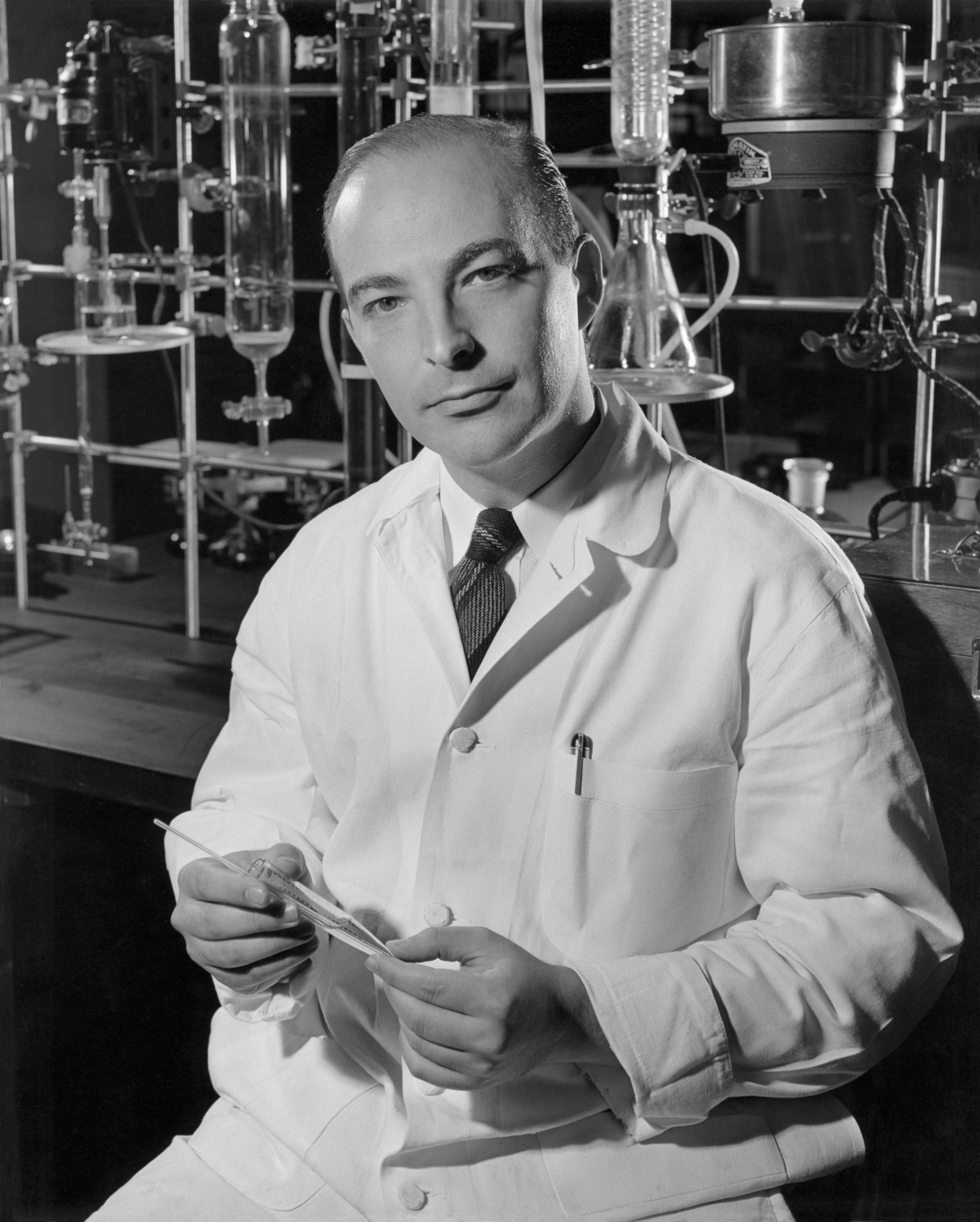
Professor Kornberg

- A team of biochemists at Stanford University, led by Nobel Prize winner Arthur Kornberg, announced in Stanford, California, that they had synthesized DNA in a test tube and that they had created the first artificial virus in what was hailed as "a giant step toward the creation of life itself".
- Greek's King Constantine II fled to Rome after his coup attempt against Greece's military junta failed. Colonel George Papadopoulos, the leader of the group that had effectively controlled the government since April, appointed Lieutenant General George Zoitakis as the regent to carry out the functions of the monarchy, and named himself the new Prime Minister to replace Konstantinos Kollias, who had fled into exile along with the royal family.
- Algeria's President Houari Boumedienne was able to crush a revolt by the Algerian Army's chief of staff, Colonel Tahar Zbori. The rebellion had broken out at El Affroun, near the military base at Blida. Following the action, Boumedienne announced that he was taking control of the People's National Army himself.
- Canada's Prime Minister Lester B. Pearson told his fellow Liberal Party members of parliament that he planned to retire, and asked the assembly to call a party convention in order to pick his successor.
- Born: Louise Lear, British meteorologist and weather forecaster for BBC; in Sheffield, South Yorkshire

== December 15, 1967 (Friday) ==
- At 4:58 in the afternoon, the Silver Bridge between Point Pleasant, West Virginia and Gallipolis, Ohio collapsed without warning when one of its eyebars broke under the weight of rush hour traffic. At the time, 31 vehicles were on the center span of the 700-foot (210 m) bridge, and either plunged 80 feet (24 m) into the Ohio River or fell into a pile of debris on the Ohio shoreline. Forty-six people were killed; nine died from severe trauma as the bridge fell on top of them, and the others drowned in waters more than 50 feet (15 m) deep; two people were swept away in the current and their bodies were never recovered. There were nine survivors who were hospitalized. The failure of the 40-year-old structure, which had been the first eyebar suspension bridge in the United States, would later be traced to two small cracks in one of the eyebars, one of them only 1.6 millimetres (0.063 in) wide, and the other twice as wide. As a result of the disaster, the Federal-Aid Highway Act of 1968 would be passed, enacting the first federal laws requiring bridge inspections and setting standards; afterward, all bridges on the national inventory were to be inspected at "regular intervals not to exceed two years".
- U.S. President Johnson signed the Wholesome Meat Act into law, requiring all states to have standards for inspection equal to, or stricter than, federal standards. Previously, the 1907 Federal Meat Inspection Act had only allowed federal inspection of meat shipped across state lines; Johnson told reporters that the new law would remedy "an intolerable condition in the 20th century in a modern nation that prides itself on reputed leadership of the world", and warned that unsanitary meat packing plants must "clean up or close down".
- The South Vietnamese government announced that they and their allies would observe a 24-hour stand-down during Christmas Day; this would be followed by a second cease-fire between December 31 and January 2. During the 24-hour Christmas ceasefire, as aerial photographs would later show, 1,300 trucks would be sent from North Vietnam to resupply Viet Cong and NVA forces in the south.
- The Age Discrimination in Employment Act of 1967 was signed into law by U.S. President Johnson, with a stated mission of promoting the employment of older persons based on ability rather than age, prohibiting arbitrary discrimination on the basis of age, and educating employers and workers on methods of resolving disputes. The law would take effect on June 12, 1968.
- NASA's Apollo Site Selection Board narrowed down its list of targets for the first manned landing on the Moon to three lunar sites, one of which would be the prime location, and two backups "spaced in lunar longitude to accommodate successive 2-day delays in launch". The Board concluded that the prime site would be in Mare Tranquillitatis, with a backup at Sinus Medii.
- The Boeing 737 airliner was certified by the U.S. Federal Aviation Administration, which approved both the 737-100 and the 737-200 at the same time. The first 737 aircraft would be delivered on December 28 to West Germany's Lufthansa airline, which would inaugurate services on February 10.
- The Folketing, Denmark's parliament, declined to pass a vote of confidence in the government of Prime Minister Jens Otto Krag; the measure failed, 85 to 92, with two abstentions. Krag called for new elections, to be held on January 23.
- Baltimore Colts quarterback Johnny Unitas was named the Associated Press NFL MVP, just 2 days before the Colts season finale vs the Los Angeles Rams.

== December 16, 1967 (Saturday) ==
- U.S. President Johnson received what a CIA analyst Samuel A. Adams would later describe to Congress as "a most remarkable memorandum" from the CIA's station in Saigon, that, "in effect... predicted the Tet Offensive" that would take place in South Vietnam six weeks later. In 1975, Adams would tell the Select Committee on Intelligence that he had pointed out to his superiors that the numerical strength of the Viet Cong was much higher than what was listed in the memo, and that the memo to the President "had failed to mention that something might be awry with the official strength estimates", which he would describe later as "phony figures".
- An aerial reconnaissance mission by U.S. Navy Lt. John Calhoun and Commander C. C. Smith found the exact location in downtown Hanoi of the Hỏa Lò Prison, nicknamed the "Hanoi Hilton" by the American prisoners of war held there.
- Born:
  - Donovan Bailey, Jamaican-born Canadian sprinter, Olympic gold medalist who held the world record for the 100-meter dash from 1996 to 1999; in Manchester, Jamaica
  - Miranda Otto, Australian film actress; in Brisbane

== December 17, 1967 (Sunday) ==
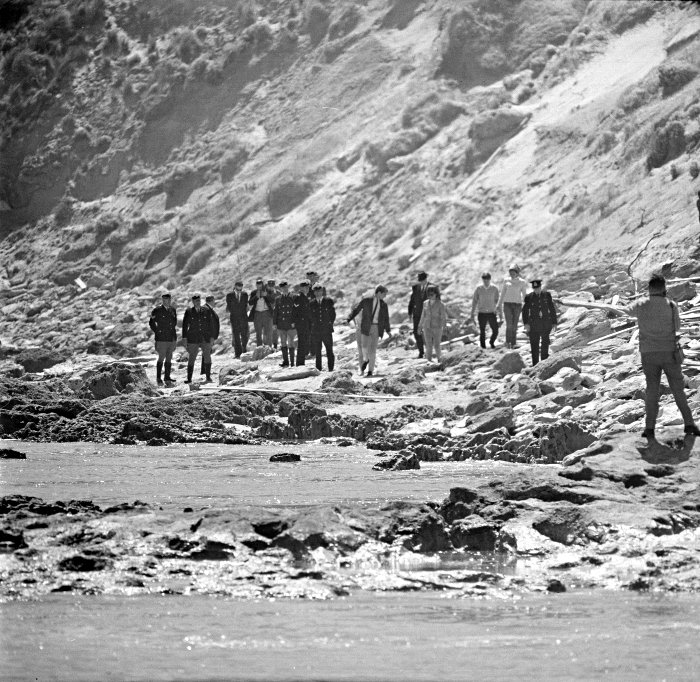
December 17, 1967: Searchers on Cheviot Beach shortly after Holt's disappearance

- The Prime Minister of Australia, Harold Holt, disappeared at about 12:30 p.m. while swimming in the ocean near Portsea, Victoria. Alan Stewart, the Director of the Port Quarantine Station and a friend of Holt's, said that he was watching from a sandy cliff overlooking Cheviot Bay, when "Mr. Holt slipped further from the shore and finally disappeared." A search by 200 people failed to find the Prime Minister. In 1983, British journalist Anthony Grey would publish a book titled The Prime Minister Was a Spy, claiming that Holt had been a spy for the People's Republic of China using the code name H. K. Bors and had defected with the aid of the crew of a Chinese submarine on the day of his disappearance.
- Christophe Soglo, the President of the west African nation of Dahomey (now Benin) was overthrown in a coup led by Major Maurice Kouandete. During the week preceding the coup, a general strike had shut down services across the nation. Kouandete would hold the office for only five days before other factions of the army forced him to turn over power to his superior officer, Colonel Alphonse Alley.
- Israel dropped official references to the West Bank and began referring to the recently captured Jordanian territory (with the exception of East Jerusalem) as "the Judea and Samaria Area", corresponding to the areas north and south of Jerusalem, respectively.
- Surveyor 5, which had demonstrated that the lunar surface would be able to support the weight of a crewed Apollo lander, ceased its transmissions to Earth more than three months after its landing on September 11.
- Born: Gigi D'Agostino, Italian record producer and Italo disco DJ; in Turin
- Died: Jack Perrin, 71, American film actor

== December 18, 1967 (Monday) ==
- A U.S. Air Force F-4D Phantom jet crashed into a crowded supermarket in Tucson, Arizona, after the pilot and co-pilot safely ejected. The fighter had taken off from Davis-Monthan Air Force Base on a training mission and then developed engine trouble. At 5:45 in the afternoon, the unmanned plane struck the Food Giant supermarket at the Cactus Shopping Center on South Alvernon Way and East 29th Street; the fuselage continued onward into a home behind the center. Despite the fire caused by 17,000 pounds of burning jet fuel, the burning down of the store and the destruction of two houses, only four people were killed; those taken to hospitals suffered no major injuries, and most were treated and released.
- In the case of Katz v. United States, the U.S. Supreme Court ruled, 7 to 1, that electronic eavesdropping devices could not be placed on public telephones without a court warrant. Charles Katz had been convicted in a federal court for violating interstate gambling laws, after the FBI had introduced six tape recordings showing that Katz had placed bets and received wagering information while talking inside a telephone booth. The decision reversed the 1928 Supreme Court ruling in Olmstead v. United States, upholding the use of warrantless wiretapping in the gathering of evidence.
- Operation Eagle Thrust, "the largest and longest military airlift ever attempted into a combat zone", was completed as the last of 10,024 troops from the U.S. Army's 101st Airborne Division arrived at the Bien Hoa Air Base in South Vietnam. Bringing the troops had required 369 C-141 Starlifter and 22 C-133 Cargomaster aircraft to fly from Fort Campbell, Kentucky.

== December 19, 1967 (Tuesday) ==
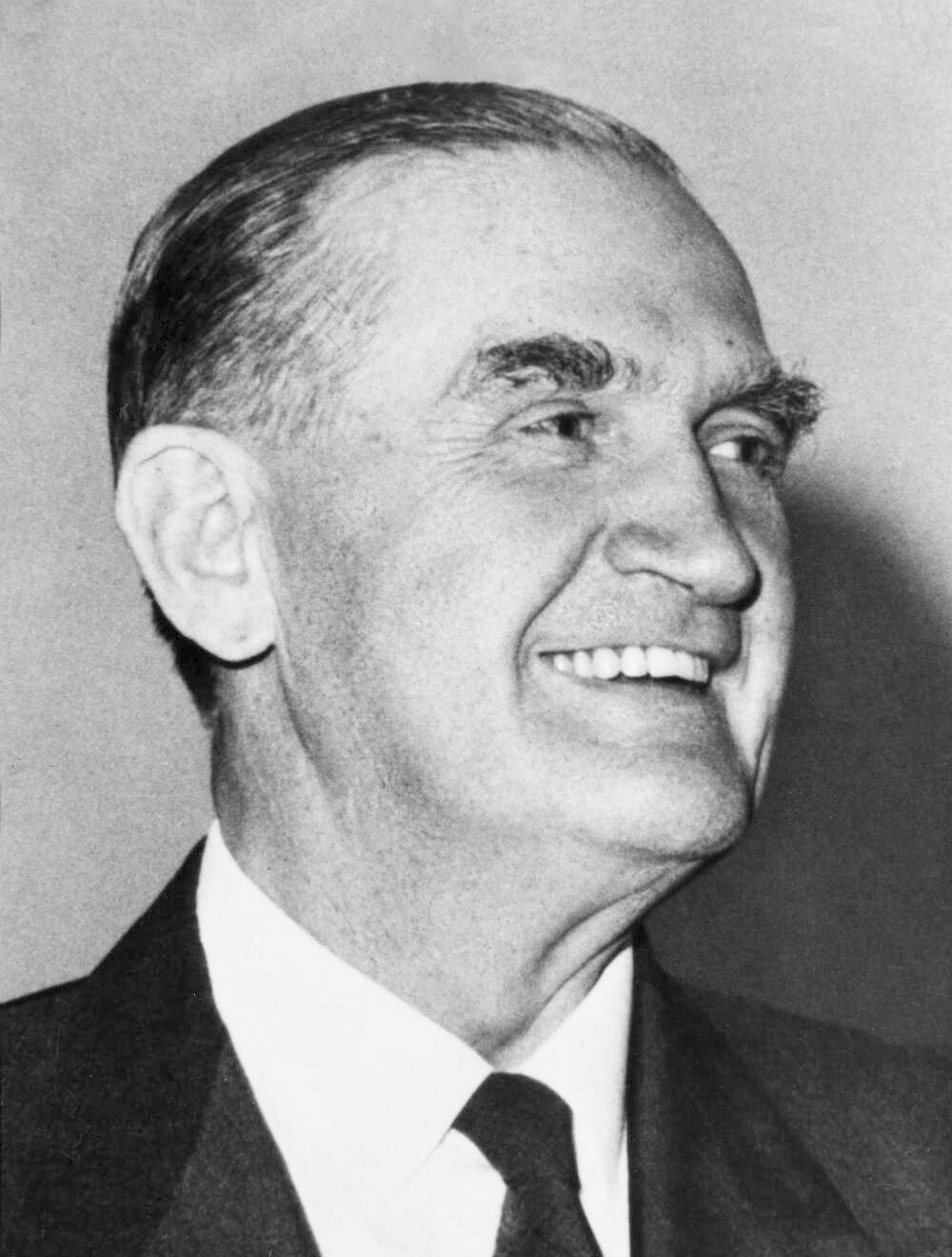
Prime Minister McEwen

- John McEwen was sworn in as the 18th Prime Minister of Australia, two days after Harold Holt's disappearance and presumed drowning. McEwen would serve as caretaker prime minister for only 22 days, resigning on January 10 and being succeeded by John Gorton.
- The Royal Navy frigate HMS Minerva engaged a French oil tanker, the Artois, which was attempting to run the British blockade of the Mozambique port of Beira to stop shipments of oil from Rhodesia. Commander M. O. Taylor of the Minerva had issued a "Stop or I Fire" directive; the French vessel's captain, Daniel Remaud, ignored the command and four warning shots, then proceeded to dock at Beira anyway. The "Artois incident" would lead to a revision of the Royal Navy's rules of engagement, and there would be no further attempts by foreign vessels to avoid interception.
- The United Nations General Assembly approved Resolution 2345 (XXII), the Agreement on the Rescue of Astronauts, the Return of Astronauts and the Return of Objects Launched into Outer Space, commonly called "the Rescue Agreement" or ARRA. The international agreement would be opened for signature on April 22 and would enter into force on December 3, 1968.
- Born:
  - Criss Angel (stage name for Christopher Sarantakos), American magician and illusionist; in Hempstead, New York
  - Charles Austin, American high jump specialist and 1996 Olympic gold medalist; in Bay City, Texas

== December 20, 1967 (Wednesday) ==
- New Orleans District Attorney Jim Garrison filed charges against a second person in his prosecutions for conspiracy to assassinate U.S. President John F. Kennedy in 1963. Reporters were unable to find out who Edgar Eugene Bradley was, and reported that "Garrison would not say where Bradley was from or what his connection was" to the assassination. Garrison had previously filed charges against Clay Shaw, the former managing director of the International Trade Mart in New Orleans. Bradley would turn out to be an employee of the International Council of Christian Churches, living in North Hollywood, California; California's Governor, Ronald Reagan, would decline a request for his arrest and extradition, and Bradley would never face a trial, while Shaw would be acquitted.
- United Aircraft Corporation gave the first test to the UAC TurboTrain, "powered by gas turbine engines similar to those used in jet aircraft", and set a record speed of 170.8 miles per hour (274.9 km/h). The two test runs took place on a section of the Pennsylvania Railroad near Princeton Junction, New Jersey. Plans at the time were to construct a high speed passenger train service between Boston and New York and sets of three-car TurboTrains would operate in the United States and Canada from 1968 to 1982.

== December 21, 1967 (Thursday) ==
- Representatives of the kingdoms of Kuwait, Saudi Arabia, and Libya announced that they would form the Organization of Arab Petroleum Exporting Countries (OAPEC), with membership open to oil-exporting Arab nations, with a goal of making economic decisions independent of the political goals of the other Arab League members. The three kingdoms would formally create OAPEC on January 9, while continuing their membership in OPEC, which included all petroleum exporting countries.
- All further contact was lost with Mariner 4, the American space probe that had made the first successful flyby of the planet Mars on July 15, 1965. Contact had been lost on October 1, 1965, then regained after two years; micrometeoroid strikes on December 10, however, had damaged the communication system.
- The Graduate, which would become the top-earning American film of 1968, was introduced to cinemas nationwide a day after premiering at the Lincoln Center, the Coronet Theatre in New York, and the 4 Star Theatre in Los Angeles.
- Moshe Dayan, Israel's Minister of Defense, authorized the International Committee of the Red Cross to visit all prisons in Israel and in the occupied territories. Visits would start at the end of February.
- Born: Mikheil Saakashvili, 3rd President of Georgia from 2008 to 2013; in Tbilisi, Georgian SSR, Soviet Union
- Died:
  - Louis Washkansky, 55, the South African grocer who had received the first human heart transplant, died at 6:50 in the morning at Cape Town, 18 days after the landmark surgery by Dr. Christiaan Barnard. A surgeon would note 40 years later that "His anti-rejection therapy had been successful in preventing organ rejection, but at the same time it had depleted his immune system so effectively that he had developed bacterial growths of klebsiella and pseudomonas in his lungs. In his frantic battle to fight rejection, Barnard had overlooked the simple diagnosis of pneumonia which had ultimately killed his patient. During the autopsy, the pathologist found a healthy heart that showed no signs of rejection and confirmed that pneumonia had been the cause of death."
  - U.S. Marine Corporal Larry E. Smedley, 18, was killed while leading a charge against a Viet Cong machine gun nest overlooking the Da Nang Air Base, even after being wounded twice by enemy gunfire; he would become the youngest recipient of the Medal of Honor for heroism in the Vietnam War.
  - Stuart Erwin, 64, American film actor

== December 22, 1967 (Friday) ==
- Five days after leading a military coup to become President of Dahomey (now Benin), Major Maurice Kouandete was forced by other factions in the Dahomeyan Army to step aside. Kouandete's superior, Colonel Alphonse Alley, was released from house arrest and took office as the new president. President Alley would serve for seven months and relinquish power to a civilian, Emile Zinsou, on August 1, 1968.
- Former French Army General Edmond Jouhaud, who had joined with three fellow generals and officers in forming the terrorist Organisation armée secrète (Secret Army Organization or "OAS") to stop French Algeria from being granted independence, was pardoned by President Charles de Gaulle, along with five other OAS members.
- Forty-seven passengers, most of them students who were on their way home for Christmas, were killed near the city of Baguio in the Philippines when their bus went out of control and plummeted over a cliff.
- Born:
  - Juan Manuel Bernal, Mexican film actor and winner of the 2015 Premio Ariel for Best Actor; in Mexico City
  - Dan Petrescu, Romanian soccer football player with 95 caps for the Romania national team; in Bucharest

== December 23, 1967 (Saturday) ==
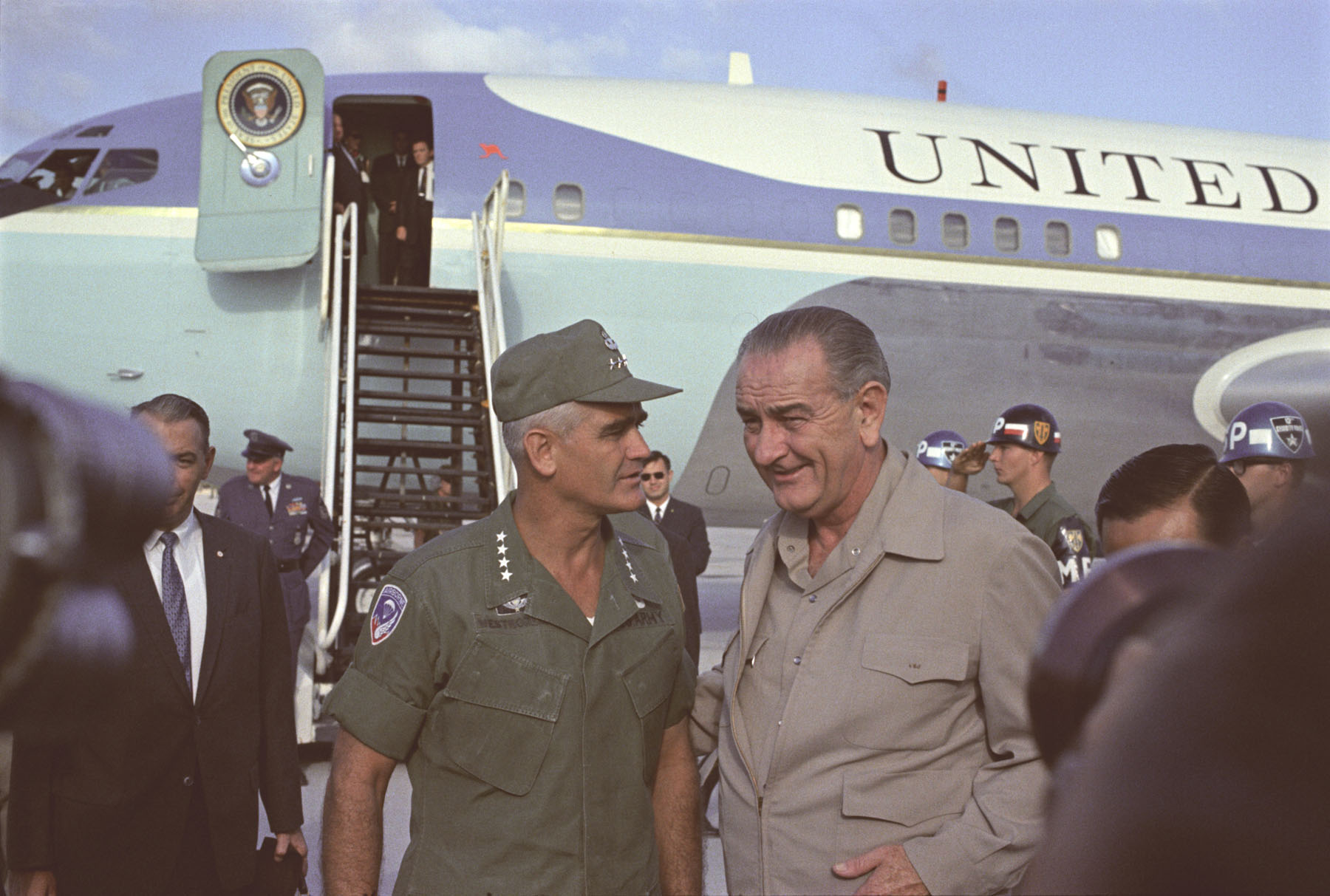
December 23, 1967: Lyndon B. Johnson with Westmoreland in Vietnam...

- U.S. President Lyndon B. Johnson made an unannounced Christmas visit to American troops in South Vietnam, stopping at the Cam Ranh Base at 8:40 a.m. local time (0140 UTC) on his way back from memorial services for Australian Prime Minister Holt. President Johnson was greeted by General William C. Westmoreland and his deputy, General Creighton W. Abrams, and Ambassador Ellsworth Bunker. He then conferred briefly with 30 of Westmoreland's field commanders before addressing 2,450 American troops. In a tour of the base hospital, Johnson shook hands with patients and personally presented Purple Heart medals to some of the wounded, then departed at 10:25 a.m. (0325 UTC).

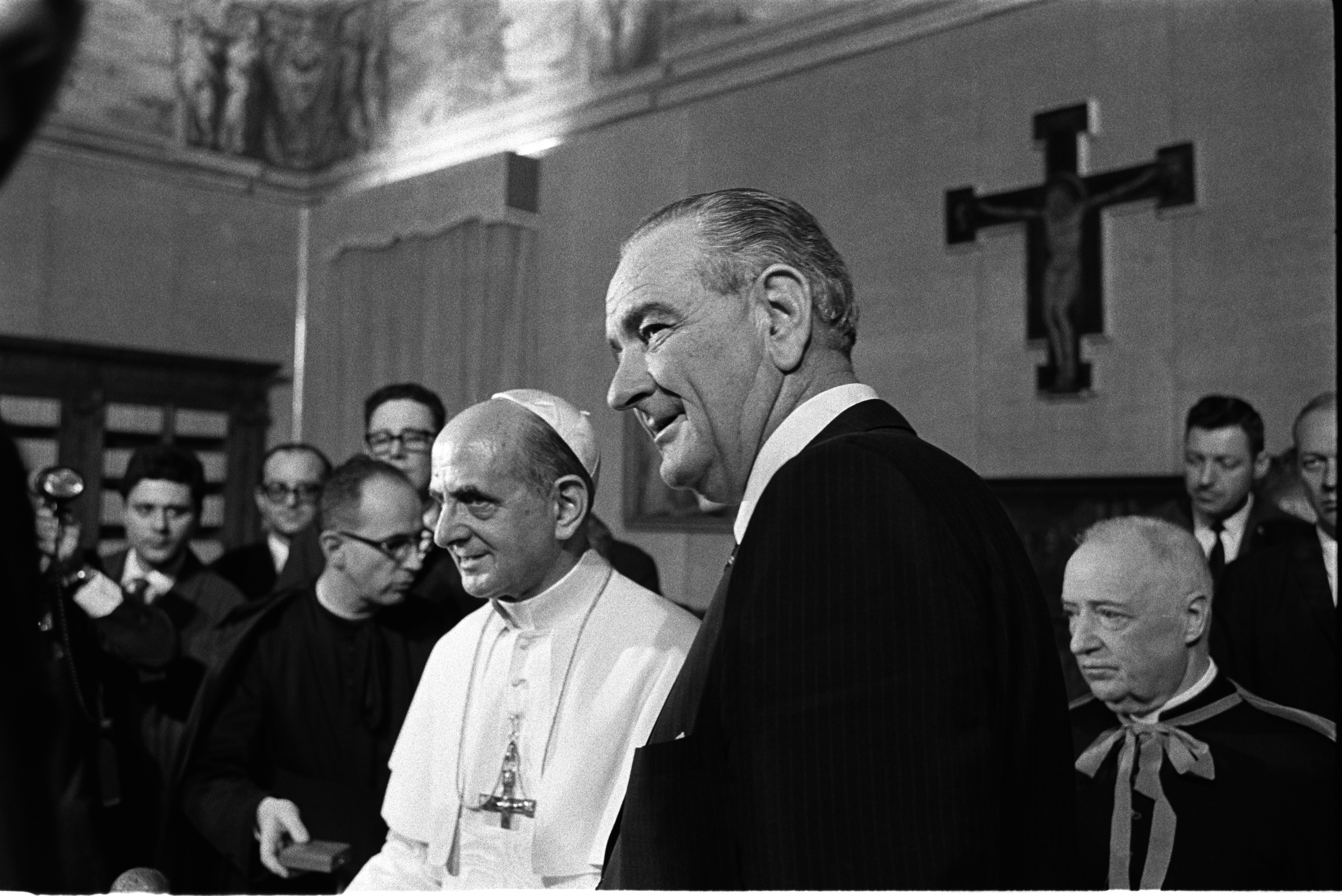
... and with Pope Paul VI at the Vatican

- Following the visit to South Vietnam, President Johnson flew westward to Karachi to meet with President Mohammed Ayub Khan of Pakistan. From there, he traveled to Rome, where he was greeted by Italy's President Giuseppe Saragat. A U.S. Army helicopter then flew him to Vatican City, landing inside the walls at the courtyard of Saint Damasus at 9:00 p.m. local time (2000 UTC). He then met with Pope Paul VI for an hour to discuss peace in the Vietnam War. It would be reported later in Time magazine that Johnson had arrived to ask the Pope to put pressure on South Vietnam's President Nguyễn Văn Thiệu (who was of the Roman Catholic faith) to negotiate with North Vietnam; that "Johnson irritated the pope by his hastily arranged helicopter landing in the Vatican gardens"; and that, according to the Time reporter, the Pope "slammed his hand on to his desk and shouted at Johnson." However, neither the President's daily diary nor the Associated Press coverage of the meeting (which was syndicated to newspapers across the globe) recorded any such outburst.
- Greece's new Prime Minister, George Papadopoulos, announced that his military junta would release most of its 2,500 political prisoners (with the exception of "former communist convicts and post-revolution saboteurs") in a Christmas amnesty in order to "restore unity and brotherhood among the Greeks". Future Prime Minister Andreas Papandreou would be released the next day, but composer Mikis Theodorakis would continue to be detained; by year's end, 284 prisoners had been freed.
- The city of Jesselton, capital of the Malaysian state of Sabah on the island of Borneo, was formally renamed as Kota Kinabalu. The settlement had been built in 1899 by the British North Borneo Company and named for the BNBC Chairman, Charles Jessel.
- Born: Carla Bruni, Italian-born singer and First Lady of France from 2008 to 2012 after her marriage to French President Nicolas Sarkozy; in Turin

== December 24, 1967 (Sunday) ==
- At 6:00 p.m. in North and South Vietnam (5:00 a.m. in Washington), a 24-hour ceasefire went into effect and the United States halted aerial bombing and other offensive operations. Earlier in the day, American bombers had bombed suspected troop concentrations in an area southwest of Dainang. The Viet Cong had announced a 72-hour ceasefire starting at 1:00 a.m. on Christmas Eve, but U.S. command noted 56 incidents of gunfire in the first 12 hours, with one American soldier wounded near An Khê and seven enemy troops killed.
- Israel rescinded its regulations requiring Christians to obtain permits in order to enter Bethlehem, which had been under Israeli control since the capture of the West Bank from Jordan in June. Palestinian Christians stayed away from the traditional birthplace of Jesus Christ despite Israel's temporary waiver of the midnight curfew for residents of the occupied territories to allow attendance at Christmas Eve ceremonies.
- The People's Republic of China tested a missile with a thermonuclear warhead and had to destroy it prematurely after the rocket went off course. China would not test any additional nuclear weapons for more than a year finally exploding a three megaton hydrogen bomb on December 27, 1968.
- The Iraq National Oil Company and the Chairman of the Soviet Union's Committee for Foreign Economic Relations signed an agreement, with the Soviets developing drilling operations in the Rumaila oil field, and Iraq granting the USSR concessions to exploit the oil resources.
- On Christmas Eve in Argentina, 16 people drowned, and another 20 were injured near the city of Tafí del Valle, after their bus overturned in the Tafi River.
- Ahmad Shukeiri resigned as chairman of the Palestine Liberation Organization.
- Died: Karl Ristenpart, 67, German symphony orchestra conductor

== December 25, 1967 (Monday) ==
- Wang Hongwen, the leader of the Red Guards in Shanghai and one of the "Gang of Four" who would later be sentenced to prison for their roles in China's Cultural Revolution, launched the first of what would become known as "red typhoons" to brutally purge the city of undesirable elements. "The targets were said to be thugs, thieves, criminals, and dandies", an author would later note, "but they included a number of otherwise blameless rebel enemies as well".
- On the same day, the New China News Agency reported that 350,000,000 copies of Quotations from Chairman Mao Tse-tung, commonly referred to as The Little Red Book had been issued during 1967. China's population at that time was almost 755 million.
- Nine people in Moscow were killed in an explosion that tore the side off a six story tall apartment building. The state-operated Soviet media, which did not usually report disasters within the nation's borders, allowed a report in an evening paper, Vechernyaya Moskva, nearly 24 hours after Moscow policemen had given the number to western reporters on the scene.
- During the halt in American bombing, a representative of the North Vietnamese Communist Party Politburo addressed North Vietnamese Army and Viet Cong leadership in South Vietnam's Thừa Thiên province near Huế about the go-ahead for what would become known as the "Tet Offensive" during the last of the three ceasefire periods observed by both sides.
- After a ceasefire that lasted for most of Christmas Day, American warplanes resumed bombing operations at 6:00 p.m. over North Vietnam, as well as on convoys that were moving supplies to Viet Cong guerrillas in South Vietnam.

== December 26, 1967 (Tuesday) ==
- The Atlantic Richfield Company (ARCO) discovered the Prudhoe Bay Oil Field, the largest oil field in North America, at a depth of 9,000 feet (2,700 m) beneath the Alaska North Slope. The find was a tribute to the persistence of ARCO's chairman and founder, Robert O. Anderson, who had persisted in oil exploration in the area above the Arctic Circle after other companies had given up and sold their leases. A year later, oil would be found at another site 7 miles (11 km) away; the oil field would be measured at nearly 334 square miles (864 km^{2}) and containing 25 billion barrels of oil.
- Eleven U.S. Army soldiers were killed, and 21 injured, when the CH-47 Chinook helicopter they were on crashed while making its approach to the Phu Cat Base as they returned after watching Bob Hope's appearance at An Khe. The rotor blades of the Chinook malfunctioned and slashed through the fuselage, cutting many of the victims, while others were hurt in the crash that followed.
- The Beatles' film Magical Mystery Tour premiered as a made-for-television movie on BBC1 in the United Kingdom. British newspaper critics derided it the next day with terms like "blatant rubbish"; "a great big bore"; "tasteless nonsense", and "witless conceit". Paul McCartney would later respond, "Aren't we entitled to have a flop?"
- Died: Sydney Barnes, 94, English professional cricketer celebrated as one of the sport's greatest bowlers

== December 27, 1967 (Wednesday) ==
- Australia won the 1967 Davis Cup in tennis for the third year in a row, and for the 15th time in the past 18 years, when the doubles team of John Newcombe and Tony Roche defeated Spain's team of Manuel Santana and Manuel Orantes in straight sets, 6–4, 6–4 and 6–4. The victory gave Australia its third straight match win over its challenger in the best three of five series. The next day, Santana would beat Newcombe in straight sets in the fourth match after Spain was mathematically eliminated, while Roy Emerson would beat Orantes.
- Apollo Applications Program Director Charles W. Mathews directed the AAP Managers at the three human spaceflight Centers to halt all activity pertaining to the AAP-IA mission, the purpose of which would have been to perform experiments in space sciences and advanced applications in a low-altitude Earth orbit for up to 14 days.
- The beginning of Hanukkah was celebrated at the Wailing Wall in Jerusalem for the first time in almost 50 years. During the British Mandate after World War I, celebrations at the Temple Mount had been prohibited, and access had not been allowed when the area was part of the Kingdom of Jordan after World War II.
- The government of the newly created People's Republic of South Yemen began the process of confiscating the property of the 123 sultans and nobility who had ruled south Arabian emirates that had been protected by British rule for 140 years.
- Died: Cyrus S. Ching, 91, Canadian-born American industrialist and negotiator who was the first director of the Federal Mediation and Conciliation Service, and one of the original members of the Wage Stabilization Board.

== December 28, 1967 (Thursday) ==
- Cambodia's prince Norodom Sihanouk gave limited permission for United States troops to cross from South Vietnam into Cambodia in order to pursue Viet Cong or NVA guerrillas.
- Died: Katharine McCormick, 92, American philanthropist and biologist who funded the research for the first birth control pill

== December 29, 1967 (Friday) ==
- Seven defendants from Neshoba County, Mississippi, were given federal prison sentences under violation of civil rights laws for their roles in the murders of civil rights workers Michael Schwerner, Andrew Goodman and James Chaney on June 21, 1964. Samuel Bowers, who had organized the killings, and Alton Wayne Roberts, who had shot all three of the victims, both received the maximum sentence of 10 years. According to one reporter, U.S. District Judge Harold Cox (who meted out the penalties) said afterward, "They killed one nigger, one Jew, and a white man. I gave them all what I thought they deserved."
- The 11-man crew of a Combat Talon aircraft assigned to Project Stray Goose disappeared during a mission over North Vietnam. For nearly 25 years, the fate of the crew of Blackbird 65-0547 would be unconfirmed until the discovery, in November 1992, of their remains and the wreckage of their MC-130 plane in dense jungle on the side of a mountain in Lai Châu province, 32 miles (51 km) northeast of Dien Bien Phu. A memorial ceremony would be held for the 11 in 1998 and the remains of the 11 men would be laid to rest at Arlington National Cemetery on November 15, 2000.
- The term "black hole", to describe an area of gravitational collapse where the pull is so great that even visible light and other electromagnetic radiation are unable to escape, was coined by Princeton University physicist John Archibald Wheeler at an after-dinner talk at the annual meeting of the American Association for the Advancement of Science (AAAS) in New York. Wheeler's speech would be reprinted in 1968 in an article in the journal American Scientist, titled "Our Universe: The Known and the Unknown".
- The Good, the Bad and the Ugly, produced and directed by Sergio Leone, and the third Italian western featuring Clint Eastwood as "The Man with No Name", made its debut in the United States, dubbed in English, a year after it had made its December 23, 1966 debut in Italy as Il buono, il brutto, il cattivo.
- The Hyundai Motor Company was incorporated in South Korea by Chung Ju-yung, who had purchased 82 acres (33 ha) of land in the city of Ulsan for construction of a factory. The incorporation name was Hyeondae Jadongcha J.H. (현대자동차).
- Born: Lilly Wachowski, American transgender film and television director, writer, and producer known for creating The Matrix franchise with her sister Lana Wachowski; in Chicago
- Died: Paul Whiteman, 77, American dance bandleader known in the 1920s as "The King of Jazz"

== December 30, 1967 (Saturday) ==
- The United Kingdom's House of Lords made an interpretation of British gaming laws that required the banning of the zero from the nation's roulette wheels, or any other feature in roulette where the bettor would be put at a disadvantage. The Lords concluded that since, in "zero roulette", the gambling house had a 3 percent advantage over the bettor (given that the odds were 35–1 on any single number, but a 36–1 chance against the ball landing on one of the 37 spots between 0 and 36 on the board), the feature was a violation of British gaming law requirements that both bettor and banker should be on equal terms; Scotland Yard detectives immediately notified gambling operators in time for New Year's Eve.
- North Vietnam's Foreign Minister, Nguyen Duy Trinh, stated that his nation would open peace discussions as soon as the United States halted bombing. South Vietnamese President Nguyễn Văn Thiệu stated that he "saw no real change" in the North Vietnamese Foreign Minister's formulation for peace, while U.S. Secretary of State Dean Rusk questioned the sincerity of the Hanoi regime, in light of the fact that the North Vietnamese had ordered an offensive for the winter season and had already violated the holiday truces. Former U.S. President Dwight Eisenhower warned President Johnson that "we must not put ourselves in the position of depending upon belief in what a Communist says."
- Died: Vincent Massey, 80, Governor General of Canada from 1952 to 1959 and the first Canadian native to be appointed to that position

== December 31, 1967 (Sunday) ==
- The Green Bay Packers won their third consecutive NFL Championship (and the right to face the AFL Champion Oakland Raiders in Super Bowl II), 21–17, over the Dallas Cowboys in what became known among NFL fans as "The Ice Bowl". Temperature at kickoff in Green Bay, Wisconsin, was −15 °F (−26 °C); the heating system underneath the field had failed and moisture in the air after the tarpaulin was removed left a sheet of ice on the grassy surface. Packers quarterback Bart Starr rushed for the winning touchdown with only 0:13 left in the game.
- Abbie Hoffman and his wife Anita Hoffman, along with Jerry Rubin, Nancy Kurshan and Paul Krassner founded the Youth International Party (YIP), which referred to its members as the Yippies.
- Motorcycle daredevil Evel Knievel attempted to jump 141 feet (43 m) over the Caesars Palace Fountains on the Las Vegas Strip. Knievel crashed on landing and the accident was caught on film.
- Born: The Braham quintuplets (Annabel Dorothy, Richard Gibson, Faith Elizabeth, Caroline, and Geoffrey Raymond), Australia's first known case of a birth of five siblings on the same day, were born at Brisbane Women's Hospital.
- Died: Waddill Catchings, 78, American economist
