= Hostage in Peking =

1970 memoir by Anthony Grey

- Author: Anthony Grey
- Language: English
- Subject: Cultural Revolution, solitary confinement, journalism
- Genre: Memoir, autobiography, non-fiction
- Publisher: Michael Joseph (UK, 1970); Doubleday (US, 1970)
- Publication date: 1970
- Publication place: United Kingdom
- Media type: Print (hardback and paperback), e-book, audiobook
- Pages: 365
- ISBN: 9798278106340
- Followed by: Crosswords from Peking (1975)

Hostage in Peking is a memoir by British journalist and author Anthony Grey, published in 1970. It recounts his 27 months of solitary confinement in Peking between July 1967 and October 1969, during which he was held under house arrest by the Chinese government as a pawn in a diplomatic dispute between China and British Hong Kong during the Cultural Revolution. The book became a bestseller in seven countries.

== Background ==
In March 1967, Reuters posted Grey to Peking as its sole correspondent in the Chinese capital, one of only four Western journalists then working in the city. He arrived during the height of Mao Zedong's Cultural Revolution. On 21 July 1967, a Chinese foreign ministry official informed Grey that he would no longer be permitted to leave his house, in retaliation for the arrest and imprisonment by the British colonial authorities in Hong Kong of eight pro-Chinese journalists who had violated emergency regulations during the leftist riots.

== Detention ==
Grey was confined to the basement of the Reuters house and office at 15 Nan Chihzte, Peking, and held in solitary confinement for 27 months, accused of spying. At midnight on 18 August 1967, approximately 200 Red Guards stormed the building, dragged Grey outside, subjected him to a stress position known as "jet-planing" and killed his cat. Maoist slogans were daubed across the walls of the house.

Grey was allowed only two 20-minute visits by British consular officials in the first 17 months of his confinement and was never formally charged. He was able to communicate by mail with his mother and girlfriend in England. To maintain his sanity, Grey secretly kept a diary written in shorthand, which he hid from his guards, and compiled more than 300 crossword puzzles. He also practised yoga and established strict daily routines, marking certain days as ones of "indomitable will to prevail."

Grey was released on 4 October 1969, after 806 days of captivity — 27 months in total. He later described himself as "the first modern international hostage of this era."

== Publication and reception ==
Grey wrote Hostage in Peking within six weeks of his release. It was published in 1970 by Michael Joseph in the United Kingdom and Doubleday in the United States, and became a bestseller in seven countries.

The Observer wrote: "How a man can survive in a state of stunning emptiness and isolation, stay alive in spirit as well as physically, is the essence of this exceptionally fine and memorable book... It is a book, in short, about a singular triumph of mind, one not to be missed."

The New Statesman described it as: "His courage was a response to the absurd; a fine mandate for a 20th Century hero... he has reported from the void: his courage is all the more remarkable for the plainness of the rest. The story does him credit twice over."

The New York Times called it "a remarkable, painful record of Mr Grey's struggle against isolation, depression and despair, and of his fierce will to maintain his sanity."

== Aftermath ==
On his return to Britain, Grey was awarded the OBE for services to journalism and named UK Journalist of the Year at the IPC National Press awards. He subsequently turned to fiction and became an international bestselling novelist, best known for his epic historical novels Saigon (1982), Peking (1988) and Tokyo Bay (1996).

Grey later described the lasting psychological impact of his detention, including a diagnosis of post-traumatic stress disorder in subsequent years. In the late 1980s he founded Hostage Action Worldwide, which worked for the release of other political hostages including John McCarthy, Brian Keenan and Terry Waite.

== Related works ==
Grey subsequently published two further works drawing on his experience in captivity:

- Crosswords from Peking (1975) — a collection of the crossword puzzles he compiled during his detention
- The Hostage Handbook: The Secret Diary of a Two-Year Ordeal in China (2009) — the secret shorthand diary he kept hidden from his guards during his imprisonment, published forty years after his release
