= The Prime Minister Was a Spy =

1983 book by Anthony Grey

- First edition
- Author: Anthony Grey
- Language: English
- Subject: Harold Holt
- Publisher: Weidenfeld & Nicolson
- Publication date: 1983
- Publication place: United Kingdom
- ISBN: 0297784439

The Prime Minister Was a Spy is a 1983 book by British writer Anthony Grey. The book's premise is that Harold Holt, prime minister of Australia from 1966 to 1967, was a lifelong spy for the Chinese government, under both the Nationalist and Communist regimes.

Its most famous claim is that Holt faked his own death; specifically, rather than drowning, he boarded a Chinese submarine stationed off the Australian coast and lived the rest of his life in Beijing. The book contains numerous factual errors and was widely ridiculed upon its release.

== Background ==
Anthony Grey was a former Reuters correspondent, best known for being held captive by the Chinese government from 1967 to 1969. He later turned to writing novels, several of which featured main characters who fell in love with Asian countries as young men.

In May 1983, Grey claimed to have received an anonymous call from a man claiming to have discovered the final fate of Harold Holt. They spent the next two months going over a manuscript, and eventually agreed that the story would be published under Grey's name.

Grey's anonymous caller was a real person, however, identified as Ronald Titcombe, a former Royal Australian Navy officer. Titcombe left the navy in 1968, apparently to avoid a court martial, and over the following decades pursued various business interests. Several of his companies went bankrupt, and at one point he had his assets seized for non-payment of debts. He was appointed secretary of the Melbourne Club in 1982 but was asked to resign when it was discovered he had failed to disclose previous financial improprieties. After an initial tip-off from an Iraqi civil servant, Titcombe claimed to have "gradually pieced together a more comprehensive story from a series of meetings with several different Chinese government officials".

In 1988, Titcombe brought action against The Observer under British libel law for describing the book as a hoax, and was awarded "substantial" undisclosed damages. However, the judgment was not a reflection upon the accuracy of the book; Titcombe was successful because The Observer was unable to prove that he had been acting in bad faith.

== Claims ==
The Prime Minister Was a Spy made the following claims:

- Holt's involvement with the Chinese government began in 1929 when he was a student at the University of Melbourne. After one of his research papers came to their attention, he was recruited by the consul-general in Melbourne to write pro-Chinese articles for a business newspaper.
- In 1931, a section was created within the Kuomintang's intelligence service to report directly to Chiang Kai-shek. Holt became the group's agent in Australia and given a handler based in Sydney.
- After being elected to the House of Representatives in 1935, Holt was earmarked for special training in espionage. He was initially intended to be a sleeper agent, but was considered too valuable and was soon reactivated. He began passing on cabinet papers and other information, writing in code and making use of dead drops.
- Holt again became a sleeper agent when the Chinese Communist Revolution broke out, but in 1952 was contacted by a Kuomintang agent (now based on Taiwan) and paid £30,000 to resume his spying. However, in 1954 he voluntarily deactivated because he had transferred his sympathies to the Communists.
- In 1957, Holt discovered that the Kuomintang agent who had contacted him in 1952 was, in fact, a representative of the Communist Party. He agreed to be reactivated once the Chinese government agreed to various conditions, and for the next ten years continued to pass on state secrets. He was given an "escape route" in case he was discovered – a submarine positioned off the Australian coast.
- In May 1967, Holt began to suspect that the Australian Security Intelligence Organisation (ASIO) had become aware of his activities. He faked his own death on 17 December 1967, pretending to drown while swimming at Cheviot Beach, Victoria – in reality, after Holt slipped below the surface two Chinese frogmen dragged him down by the ankles and guided him to the conning tower of a waiting Chinese submarine. Holt spent the rest of his life in Beijing, and ASIO erased any trace of his defection to cover up its own errors.

== Reception ==
Shortly after publication, The Guardian noted that "many Australians feel the story could be as big a hoax as that played on Stern magazine and Times Newspapers over the Hitler Diaries". It further observed that "many of the book's claims are either wrong, dubious or uncheckable".

Quoted in The New York Times, Gareth Evans, Australia's Attorney-General at the time, said "the whole tale seems to be straight out of fruitcake land", while the Chinese government issued a statement describing it as "sheer fabrication".

James Rusbridger, a British espionage researcher, wrote in 1991, "Were it not for the distress the allegations caused the Holt family, such a tale might be marginally amusing and deserve a short-lived place on the fiction shelves. But what is most interesting about this story is the manner in which all sorts of vague allegations are linked together and then presented as proven evidence upon which to base the claim of Holt's treachery."

In 2005, Tom Frame, Holt's biographer, described Titcombe and Grey's account as a "complete fabrication". He notes that there is "no corroborative evidence" for most of their claims, as none of the documents referred to in the book were produced. Further, Holt was stridently anti-Communist, notes Frame, and the large sums of money he supposedly received were never reflected in his lifestyle. Frame also says Holt was highly unlikely to have deserted his wife and children, and the waters off Cheviot Beach were too shallow for a submarine to submerge. Zara Holt observed that her husband "didn't even like Chinese food".

== See also ==
- Who Killed Harold Holt? – Australian television program
