= Disappearance of Harold Holt =

1967 presumed death of the Prime Minister of Australia

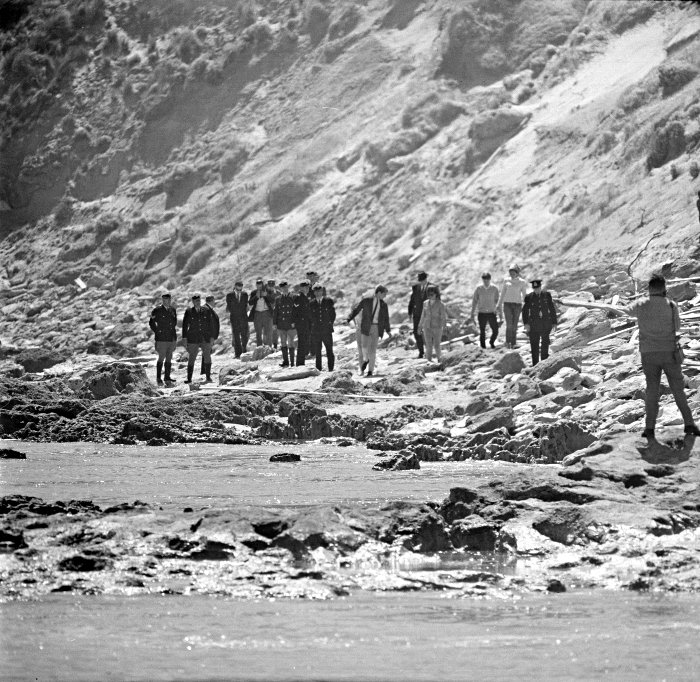
- A search party combing Cheviot Beach after Holt's disappearance
- Date: 17 December 1967; 58 years ago
- Time: approx. 12:20 p.m.
- Location: Cheviot Beach, Point Nepean, Victoria, Australia; 38.3117°S 144.6640°E
- Participants: Harold Holt, Prime Minister of Australia
- Deaths: 1 (presumed)

On 17 December 1967, Harold Holt, the 17th prime minister of Australia, disappeared while swimming in the sea near Portsea, Victoria. An enormous search operation was mounted in and around Cheviot Beach, but his body was never recovered. Holt was presumed to have drowned, and his memorial service five days later was attended by many world leaders.

It is generally agreed that Holt's disappearance was a simple case of an accidental drowning, the only other plausible explanation being that he could have been attacked by a shark. However, a number of conspiracy theories surfaced. The most famous suggestion was that he was a spy for China and had been collected by a Chinese submarine. However, this theory was quickly proven false. Holt was the third Australian prime minister to die in office, after Joseph Lyons in 1939 and John Curtin in 1945.

Holt was initially replaced in a caretaker capacity by John McEwen, and then by John Gorton following the 1968 Liberal Party leadership election. Holt's death has entered Australian folklore, and was commemorated by, among other things, the Harold Holt Memorial Swimming Centre.

== Background ==
Harold Holt became the 17th prime minister of Australia in January 1966, following the retirement of Sir Robert Menzies. Holt was a career politician, entering parliament at the age of 27 and becoming a government minister at the age of 31.

As with Menzies, Holt refused a security detail upon taking office, considering it unnecessary and potentially alienating to the general public. His stance changed after two incidents in mid-1966 – a window in his office was shattered by a sniper, and then an assassination attempt was made on Arthur Calwell, the Leader of the Opposition. Holt grudgingly accepted a single bodyguard for his official duties, but refused any protection while on holiday, regarding it as a violation of his privacy. His wife Zara later suggested that this was so he could hide his extramarital affairs.

=== Holt and the ocean ===
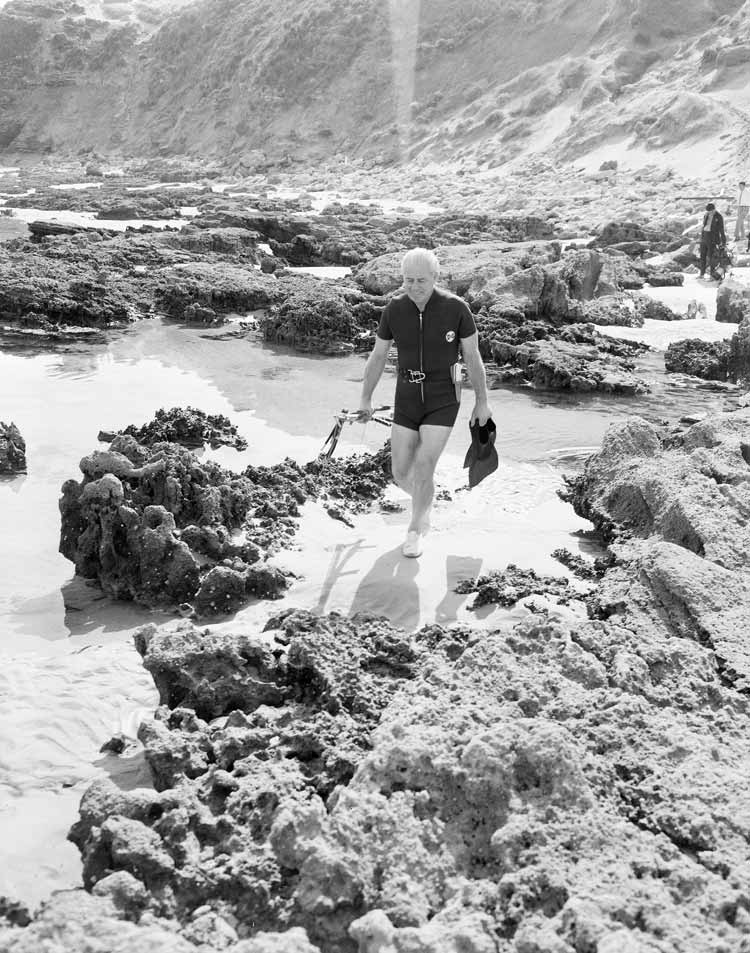
Harold Holt on a spearfishing expedition at Portsea, Victoria, in 1966

Holt was a keen outdoorsman and had beach houses at Portsea, Victoria, and Bingil Bay, Queensland. He was introduced to spearfishing in 1954, and it soon became his preferred holiday activity. Holt wore a wetsuit so he could fish year round, and preferred either skin diving or snorkelling as he found air tanks burdensome and inauthentic. Once he had speared a fish, he would unzip his suit and place it inside (still bleeding), allowing him to continue fishing. According to his companions, Holt had "incredible powers of endurance underwater" and sometimes kept himself amused during parliamentary debates by seeing how long he could hold his breath. Although he could tread water for long periods, he was not a strong surface swimmer.

Several of Holt's friends confronted him about the dangers of his hobby, including his press secretary, Tony Eggleton, to whom Holt responded, "Look Tony, what are the odds of a prime minister being drowned or taken by a shark?" On 20 May 1967, Holt had a close call while diving at Cheviot Beach on the Mornington Peninsula, where he became distressed and called for help. Pulled ashore by his diving companions, he remained conscious, but turned purple and vomited a large amount of seawater. Holt attributed the incident to a leaking snorkel and supposedly remarked, "That's the closest I have ever been to drowning in my life!" A few months later, on 5 August, which was also his 59th birthday, he was spearfishing at Dunk Island on the Great Barrier Reef. He spent twenty-five minutes chasing a large coral trout, but eventually had to abandon the pursuit due to extreme shortness of breath.

=== Holt's health ===
Holt had been in reasonably good health throughout his life, although he had a family history of premature death – his father had died at the age of 59 and his older brother at the age of 57. Holt himself suffered a severe concussion in a road accident in November 1955, in which the driver of his ministerial car was killed. In September 1967, Holt began treatment for a painful shoulder injury that he had originally suffered playing football in his youth; he was prescribed painkillers and twice-weekly physiotherapy. A few days before his death, he had been briefly examined by his personal physician, Marcus Faunce, who advised him to avoid overexerting himself and to cut back on swimming and tennis.

The Prime Minister is Missing, a 2008 docudrama, suggested that Holt's judgement on the weekend of his death had been impaired by his medication, in combination with work-related tiredness and stress. Morphine was named as the drug that he had been prescribed, although "no direct evidence" indicated that he had taken any on the day of his death.

=== Lead-up to 17 December ===
Holt's final cabinet meeting of 1967 began late on Thursday, 14 December and ended early the following morning. He returned to The Lodge for a few hours of sleep, and then returned to his Parliament House office at 8:30 am to finalise a press release. At 11 am, Holt left Parliament House and was driven to RAAF Base Fairbairn, where he boarded a military jet to Melbourne. His wife Zara stayed in Canberra to finalise preparations for the annual Christmas party. On arriving in Melbourne, Holt and his personal secretary, Patricia De Lacy, were driven to his constituency office. After dictating a few letters, he went on to his home at St Georges Road, Toorak. There, he informed his housekeeper, Edith "Tiny" Lawless, that he would be spending the weekend at his beach house in Portsea. He also carried with him a letter from the Liberal Party whip expressing concern at the performance of the government.

While driving to Portsea in his red Pontiac Parisienne, Holt stopped in Sorrento, where he saw Marjorie Gillespie, a neighbour with whom he had been having an affair. Holt then had drinks with Gillespie and her husband Winton. That night he had dinner with Lawless, who had driven down separately, bringing Holt's clothes and provisions for the weekend.

On Saturday, 16 December at Portsea, Holt rose early and ate a light breakfast. He did some gardening, and made phone calls to Eggleton and his stepson Nicholas, inviting the latter down to Portsea. Holt played tennis in the afternoon, and then spent some time with Nicholas and his family. In the evening he attended a neighbour's cocktail party for about an hour, and then returned home to host a dinner party with about a dozen guests.

== Disappearance ==
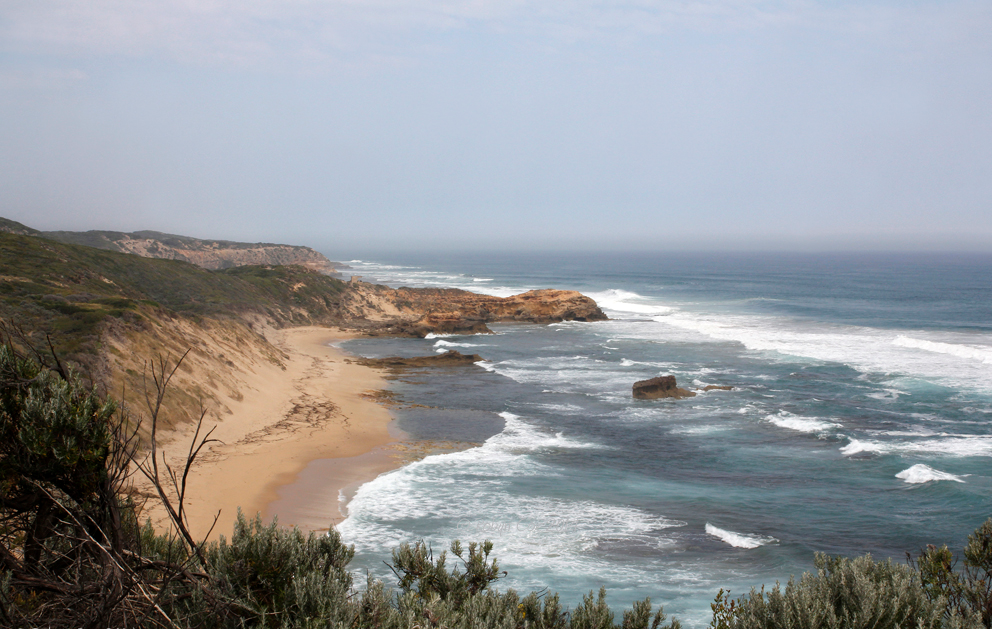
Cheviot Beach, the site of Holt's disappearance, faces the Bass Strait separating Victoria and Tasmania

Holt again rose early on Sunday, 17 December and, after breakfast, telephoned his wife. He drove to the local general store mid-morning, where he bought insect repellent, peanuts, and the weekend newspapers. One of the headlines in The Australian was "PM advised to swim less", which detailed the latest advice from Holt's doctor, but whether Holt bought or read that particular paper is unknown. On returning home, Holt made plans for the rest of the day, which included a visit to Point Nepean, a barbecue lunch, and an afternoon spearfishing trip. At 11:15 am, he and four others set out for Point Nepean, where they hoped to watch solo circumnavigator Alec Rose pass through The Rip into Port Phillip Bay. He was accompanied by Gillespie, her daughter Vyner, and two family friends of the Gillespies, Martin Simpson and Alan Stewart. It was a hot day, and Rose's yacht was barely visible, so the group stayed only a short while before leaving.

On the drive back to Portsea, Holt suggested that the group stop at Cheviot Beach for a swim – it was about 12:15 pm, and he wanted to cool down and work up an appetite before lunch. Holt knew the area well and had swum there many times before, in 1960 even salvaging a porthole from the SS Cheviot, the shipwreck that had given the beach its name. Holt did not hesitate in entering the water, despite a large swell and visible currents and eddies. Stewart was the only other swimmer, as the others considered it unsafe. Stewart stayed close to shore, and even in the shallows felt a strong undertow. However, Holt swam into deeper water and was dragged out to sea. The others called out to him, but he did not raise his arms or cry for help. He soon slipped under the waves and out of sight, in a manner which Gillespie described as "like a leaf being taken out [...] so quick and final".

== Search ==
Following Holt's disappearance, Stewart drove to the nearby Officer Cadet School, Portsea, an Australian Army training facility. The school was virtually deserted, as most personnel were on annual leave, but the Victoria Police were contacted and initiated what became "one of the largest search operations in Australian history". The entire Australian Defence Force was put on high alert. The search for Holt's body began at 1:30 pm, when three amateur divers entered the water and found it too rough. They were soon joined by helicopters, watercraft, police divers, and two naval diving teams. Little progress was made, however, because of the rough conditions and limited equipment available. By the end of the day, more than 190 personnel were involved, with operations based out of the Officer Cadet School; this number eventually increased to more than 340.

The search resumed just before 5:00 am on 18 December, despite strong wind, heavy seas, and occasional rain. Working in shifts, fifty divers focused on the rock pools and ledges near where Holt had last been sighted. They were forced to free dive to minimise injury, as they were continuously being driven against the nearby cliff face. A change in the tide suspended the search at 8:00 am; it resumed in the midafternoon. The following day's operations were again hampered by the weather. Conditions improved on Wednesday, 20 December, but by the following day, most personnel were being withdrawn. The search for Holt's body was officially called off on 5 January 1968, although it had been gradually scaled back to the point where it consisted only of a daily beach patrol. Lieutenant-Commander Phil Hawke, who led the HMAS Lonsdale diving team, later stated, "any chance of finding the prime minister was lost by the Sunday night".

== Aftermath ==
Rumours of Holt's disappearance reached the media just over an hour after it occurred, and the first conclusive report was made at about 1:45 pm on Melbourne radio station 3DB. Holt's wife Zara was told of the disappearance by Peter Bailey, one of the prime minister's secretaries.

=== Memorial service ===
External videos
- Footage of Holt's memorial service from the National Film and Sound Archive

A memorial service for Holt was held on 22 December at St Paul's Cathedral, Melbourne. It was led by Tom Thomas, the Dean of Melbourne, with a single eulogy given by Philip Strong, the Anglican Primate of Australia. Due to the absence of a body, no prayers of committal were made. Within the cathedral were 2,000 attendees, with many thousands more lining the nearby streets and listening through a public-address system. Thirty newspaper reporters were given seats, but only one official photographer was allowed, as was a single movie camera at the back of the building.

The service was attended by:

- United Kingdom: Charles, Prince of Wales, Prime Minister Harold Wilson and Leader of the Opposition Edward Heath
- United Nations: Secretary General U Thant
- United States of America: President Lyndon B. Johnson
- New Zealand: Prime Minister Keith Holyoake
- Philippines: President Ferdinand Marcos
- Singapore: Prime Minister Lee Kuan Yew
- South Korea: President Park Chung Hee
- South Vietnam: President Nguyễn Văn Thiệu
- Taiwan: Premier C. K. Yen
- Thailand: Prime Minister Thanom Kittikachorn

Fiji, India, Indonesia, Japan, Laos, Malaysia, and Western Samoa sent their foreign ministers as representatives, while numerous other countries sent their ambassadors. After the service, there was a formal reception at Government House, Melbourne.

=== Succession issues ===
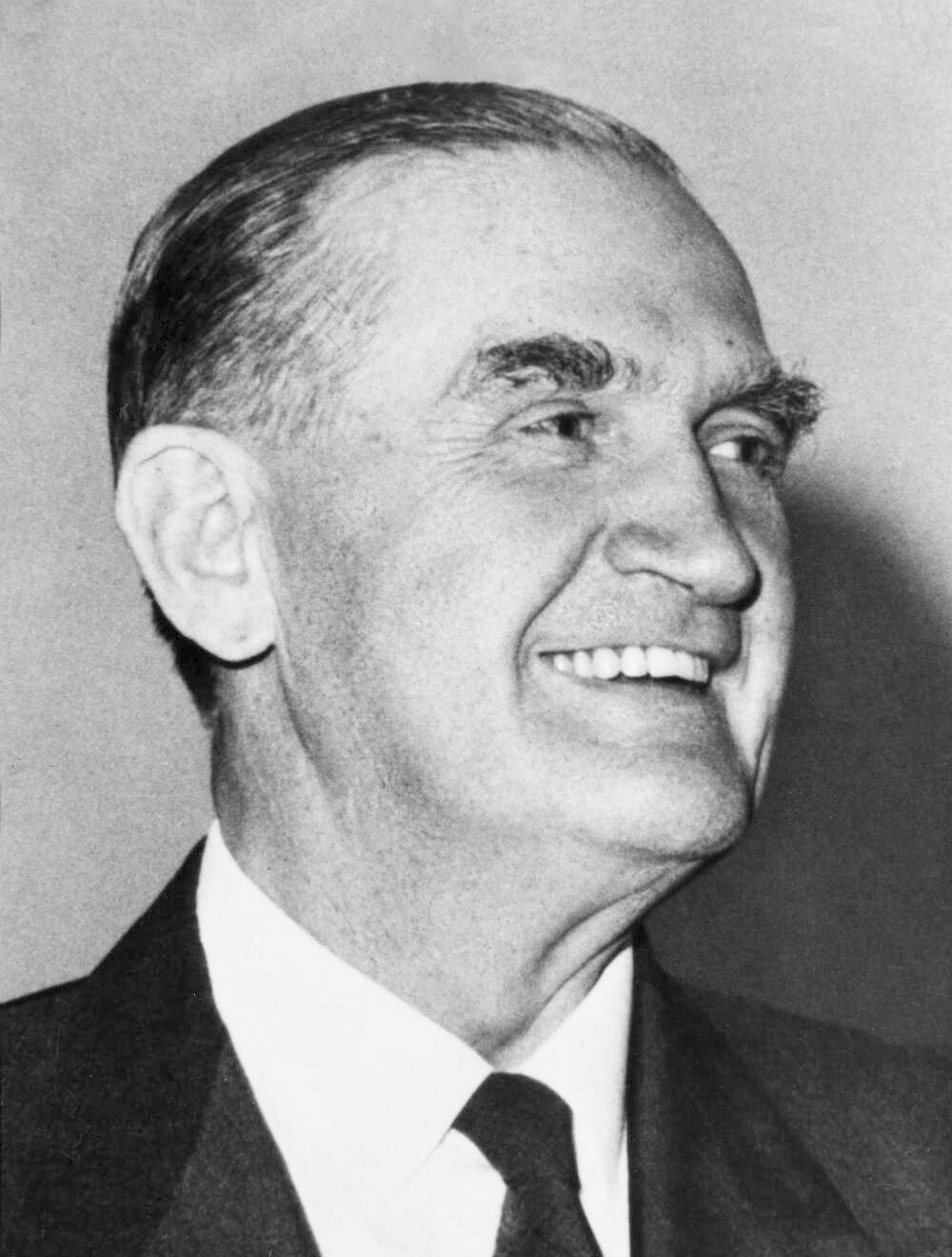
John McEwen

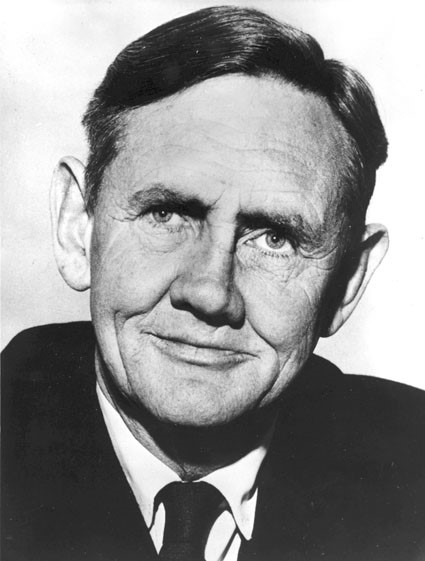
John Gorton

John McEwen, the leader of the Country Party and de facto deputy prime minister, was at his farm in Stanhope, Victoria, when he was informed of Holt's disappearance. He immediately made his way to Canberra, and on the evening of 17 December met with Lord Casey, the governor-general, at Yarralumla. Casey had already conferred with Chief Justice Garfield Barwick and Attorney-General Nigel Bowen, and agreed with McEwen that he should be commissioned to form a caretaker government while the Liberal Party elected a new leader. This was based on the precedent set in 1939, when Earle Page was made temporary prime minister after the death of Joseph Lyons. Casey issued a statement announcing his intentions the following day, and McEwen was sworn in as prime minister on the afternoon of Tuesday 19 December.

Discussions about who would succeed Holt as leader of the Liberal Party began as soon as his disappearance became general knowledge. The situation was complicated by McEwen publicly announcing that the Country Party would leave the Coalition if the Liberals selected Treasurer William McMahon (the party's deputy leader). The Liberal Party's leadership election was not held until 9 January 1968, twenty-three days after the disappearance. The four candidates were John Gorton, Paul Hasluck, Billy Snedden, and Les Bury. Gorton was elected over Hasluck on the second ballot and was sworn in as prime minister the following day – the first senator to hold the office. In line with the constitutional convention that the prime minister must sit in the House of Representatives, he resigned from the Senate on 1 February to contest the by-election caused by Holt's death, which was held on 24 February. He won an easy victory, and was sworn into the House on 12 March.

== Analysis ==
According to his biographer, Tom Frame, "there could never realistically be much doubt that Harold Holt drowned – he was simply one of the number of ordinary Australians who drown each year through poor judgment or bad luck." Holt likely misjudged his own swimming ability and the roughness of the conditions, and was simply overcome by exhaustion. Alternatively, he may have suffered a heart attack, been struck by driftwood, stung by jellyfish, or attacked by a shark. Holt's body was probably either trapped below the surface or washed out to sea on the ebb tide. It was not unusual for this to occur – three men had drowned at a beach in Rye a few years earlier, with one body disappearing and the other two ending up in different places. Sir Robert Southey, a senior figure in the Liberal Party's organisational wing, said of the events in a 1994 interview:

My own feeling about what happened is something like this: [Holt] was a very good swimmer, a very good snorkeler and he came back to Melbourne and troubled, not very well, overstretched, overstrained, worried I believe at the ascendancy which Whitlam was beginning to gain and thinking, "Well now I can relax there's one area in which I really am unchallenged boss, and that's the sea." And I think in that sort of frame of mind he went to the element where he felt liberated and misjudged the kindness with which his favourite element would receive him on that fateful day.

Some have suggested that Holt entered the water primarily to impress Gillespie, with whom he was having an affair. (Zara stated that this was the case; while Gillespie initially would not confirm that her relationship with Holt had been sexual in nature, she later confirmed that they had been having an affair.)

=== Formal investigations ===
Despite Holt's position, formal responsibility for the subsequent investigation lay with Victoria Police, rather than a federal agency. Jack Ford, a detective with experience in homicide, was tasked with leading the investigation into Holt's disappearance, the day after it occurred. Ford was assisted by Aubrey Jackson of the Commonwealth Police (precursor of the Australian Federal Police). The resulting police report was released on 5 January 1968, but did not record any definitive findings due to a lack of evidence. Senior pathologist James McNamara was consulted about what might have happened to Holt's body and suggested that it may have been trapped by kelp and then consumed by sea creatures (specifically sharks, crayfish, and/or sea lice). If that were the case, "the body would have been reduced to a skeleton in a period as short as 24 to 48 hours". Some of those involved in the investigation later reported that certain relevant information had been deliberately omitted from the final report – for instance, Simpson's statement that Holt had had several cans of beer in his bag. (Note: Holt did not have a reputation as a prolific drinker, and reputedly favoured cocktails rather than wine or beer.)

The federal government declined to conduct its own inquiry, as the disappearance was considered uncontroversial and his family did not want one. Until 1985, state law did not allow for the Coroners Court of Victoria to conduct an inquest without the presence of a body. In August 2003, State Coroner Graeme Johnstone announced that his office had compiled a list of 103 cold cases involving suspected drownings where bodies were never recovered. By November 2004, 82 cases had been deemed suitable for coronial inquests, including that of Holt. Johnstone opened a formal inquest in August 2005, and handed down his findings early the following month. He concluded that, "Mr Holt took an unnecessary risk and drowned in rough water off Cheviot Beach [...] there is nothing of significance in any of the material gathered that would indicate anything other than drowning occurred". Johnstone also criticised the decision not to hold a governmental inquiry at the time of the disappearance, suggesting that it "may have avoided the development of some of the unsubstantiated rumours and unusual theories".

=== Suggestions of suicide ===
Some have advanced the view that Holt's death was not accidental, but rather that he chose to end his own life. Supporters of this theory claim that Holt was depressed and mentally unstable, and killed himself because he thought his political career was in jeopardy. Those who reject it point to his joie de vivre and commitment to his family, as well as the plans he had made for the coming year. The 1968 police report specifically ruled out suicide, as Holt had followed "an ordinary domestic pattern" in the days before his disappearance, and suicides in front of witnesses were considered atypical.

Who Killed Harold Holt?, a Nine Network television documentary that aired in 2007, gave particular credence to the suicide theory, as did an article in The Bulletin published the same year. In response, Holt's son Sam gave an interview in which he said "there's no mystery, in essence there's no credibility at all; no one in our family believes it"; Zara had earlier said that her husband was "too selfish" to commit suicide. Two of Holt's former colleagues, Eggleton and Malcolm Fraser, were also interviewed around the same time, and both rejected any suggestion of suicide; Alick Downer and James Killen had expressed similar sentiments in their memoirs. (Note: Eggleton said Holt "didn't sound like a man planning to jump into the sea and end it the next day" (in reference to a phone conversation they had had on 16 December).; Fraser said, "if somebody is planning to jump off a cliff, they are not at the same time planning to have a major cabinet review of the direction that Australia's taking" (in reference to plans Holt and he had discussed for 1968).; Downer said, "no one who really knew Holt would lightly come to such a conclusion ... Holt was not the sort of man who would sacrifice everything for the unknown".; Killen said, "there was nothing I ever saw in his make-up which would give the slightest support to the view that he could become desperate and suicidal".) Peter Butt, who produced the 2008 docudrama The Prime Minister is Missing, observed, "no one thought it was in his character and all those who know him dismiss the idea completely".

In contrast, Edward St John believed suicide was plausible, suggesting that Holt's death "appeared to be an act of a man who either wanted to die or didn't much care whether he lived or died". Senior public servant Sir Lenox Hewitt recalled in a 1994 interview that Holt had seemed depressed in the period before his death.

=== Conspiracy theories ===
Holt's disappearance spawned numerous conspiracy theories, most of which involve claims of a cover-up at the highest level of government. A 1968 story in the Sunday Observer claimed that Holt had been assassinated by the US Central Intelligence Agency, supposedly because he intended to pull Australian troops out of Vietnam. Also, suggestions were made that Holt had been killed by the North Vietnamese (after being incapacitated by a nerve agent), or that he had faked his own death to be with a lover.

In 1983, British journalist Anthony Grey published The Prime Minister Was a Spy, in which he claimed that Holt was a lifelong spy for the People's Republic of China. According to Grey, Holt faked his own death to defect to China and was "collected" by frogmen who dragged him to a waiting submarine. Reviewers noted multiple factual errors in the book, not least that it was physically impossible for a submarine to be positioned so close to the shore. Holt's wife and grandson have both rejected the theories; Zara also observed that her husband "didn't even like Chinese food".

== Legacy ==
Holt is remembered more for the circumstances of his death than for his political achievements. Sol Encel believed that his disappearance marked the end of an interregnum between the stability of Menzies and the internal conflict the Liberal Party experienced under Gorton and McMahon. Australia had only one prime minister (Menzies) from 1949 to 1965, but six prime ministers from 1966 to 1975. Peter Bowers said that Holt's death ended Australia's "age of innocence", as it meant national leaders could no longer keep their private lives completely away from public scrutiny.

=== Memorials ===
On the first anniversary of Holt's death, a commemorative plaque was bolted to a reef at Cheviot Beach, about 15 m (49 ft) underwater. Monuments to Holt were placed on the cliff above the beach and at the Melbourne General Cemetery, the latter featuring the inscription "he loved the sea". In September 1968, a naval communication station in Western Australia was renamed in Holt's honour. The following year, Holt's widow was invited to Los Angeles to launch the USS Harold E. Holt – one of only a handful of U.S. Navy ships named after foreign leaders. In March 1969, the Harold Holt Memorial Swimming Centre was opened in suburban Melbourne; it had been under construction at the time of Holt's death, and the Malvern City Council voted to name it in his honour, in part because he had been the local member of parliament. The Australian Army also dedicated a swimming pool to Holt's memory – the Harold Holt Memorial Pool at the Australian base in Vũng Tàu, Vietnam.

=== Popular culture ===
Holt's death has entered Australian folklore, and is frequently the subject of black humour. Travel writer Bill Bryson labelled it "the swim that needed no towel." Holt's name has become a byword for any sudden or unexplained disappearance; the phrase "to do a Harold Holt" is rhyming slang for "to bolt" (i.e., to make a quick exit). Holt's death spawned a storyline in the Australian soap opera Neighbours, and has also been credited with inspiring The Fall and Rise of Reginald Perrin, a British television series. In 1988, rugby league commentator Jack Gibson – ex-coach of the Cronulla-Sutherland Sharks – said, "waiting for Cronulla to win a Grand Final is like leaving a porch light on for Harold Holt". Over the following thirty years, opposition fans taunted Cronulla by waving posters of Holt's face and dressing up in wetsuits; the club eventually won its first premiership in 2016.
