= Who Killed Harold Holt? =

Australian television program

- Genre: Documentary
- Presented by: Ray Martin
- Country of origin: Australia
- Original language: English

Production
- Running time: 60 minutes (including commercials)

Original release
- Network: Nine Network
- Release: 20 November 2007

Who Killed Harold Holt? is an Australian television special which explores the disappearance and presumed drowning of Harold Holt, the Prime Minister of Australia from 1966 to 1967. Hosted by Ray Martin, it was broadcast on 20 November 2007 on the Nine Network, approximately one month before the 40th anniversary of Holt's disappearance.

The special explored several theories about Holt's disappearance, but gave particular credence to the proposition that he had ended his own life. It managed disappointing ratings for its 9:30–10:30 timeslot, achieving only 934,000 viewers nationally. In the lead-up to its airing, Holt's biographer, Tom Frame, published an opinion piece in The Australian which described the allegations made in the documentary as "unjustified and contrary to all the evidence". His son, Sam Holt, said that he was "amazed that people can still keep bringing up fallacious theories".

== See also ==
- The Prime Minister Was a Spy
