= Saigon (Grey novel) =

1982 novel by Anthony Grey

- First edition (US)
- Author: Anthony Grey
- Audio read by: Gordon Griffin
- Language: English
- Subject: Vietnam
- Genre: Historical novel
- Set in: Vietnam, 1925–1975
- Publisher: Weidenfeld & Nicolson (UK); Little, Brown (US); Open Road Integrated Media (current)
- Publication date: 1982
- Publication place: United Kingdom
- Media type: Print (hardback and paperback), e-book, audiobook
- Pages: 789 pages
- ISBN: 0316328227
- OCLC: 8668578
- Preceded by: The Chinese Assassin (1978)
- Followed by: Peking (1988)

Saigon is a historical novel by British author Anthony Grey, published in 1982. It follows the lives of three families — one American, one French, and one Vietnamese — from the French colonial era in the early 1920s until the last helicopter left Saigon at the end of the Vietnam War. It became an international bestseller and has been translated into 16 languages worldwide.

== Plot ==
Joseph Sherman first visits Saigon — the capital of French colonial Cochin-China — as a young man on his father's hunting trip in 1925. But the exotic land lures him back again and again as a traveller, soldier, and reporter. He returns because of his fascination for the enchanting city — and for Lan, a mandarin's daughter he cannot forget.

Over a period of five decades, Joseph becomes involved in the political intrigues of two influential Saigon families: the French colonial Devereaux family and the Vietnamese Tran family. Through their experiences, he witnesses Vietnam's turbulent history, including the uprising against French colonial rule, the French defeat at Dien Bien Phu, and the arrival of American military advisers during the early stages of the Vietnam War.

== Background and research ==
Saigon is Anthony Grey's fourth novel. Grey spent four years writing it between 1978 and 1982. He lived in Paris for six months to research the first five sections of the novel, set in French colonial Vietnam, spending time at the archives of the old French Ministry of Colonies in the Rue Oudinot, the colonial newspaper archive in Versailles, and the Bibliothèque Nationale in central Paris. He then moved to Washington for eighteen months to research and write the last three sections dealing with America's involvement in Vietnam, working daily at the Library of Congress on Capitol Hill and at the National Archives in Washington.

Grey was unable to visit Vietnam during his research as he could not obtain a visa despite repeated applications. His first visit to the country came in the late 1980s when he travelled there to make a one-hour television documentary for the BBC entitled Return to Saigon. During that trip Grey learned that the Vietnamese government had translated the novel for use in teaching officer cadets at the People's Defence University in Hanoi, and that it was also being used as a teaching aid at the United States Naval Academy at Annapolis.

Grey described his motivation for writing the novel: "My primary motivation for writing Saigon and my other historical novels about long-term strife between East and West was the conviction that, in a chronically troubled world, it was vital to understand our past fully in order to make better decisions about the future."

== Reception ==
Saigon received widespread critical acclaim on publication and became an international bestseller.

The San Francisco Chronicle wrote: "This superb novel could well be the War and Peace of our age. By using a technique of historic progression Anthony Grey does for the Vietnam Wars what Leo Tolstoy did for the Napoleonic wars."

The Kansas City Star called it "an epic novel of terrible importance... Like James Michener and James Clavell, Mr Grey is a master storyteller. Unlike them, however, he has something pertinent to say and does so in distinguished fashion."

The Daily Mail described it as "an absorbing saga, an epic novel... Anthony Grey is not just a man of steely courage as his survival of two years as a hostage in Peking demonstrated; he is one of that rare species — a born storyteller."

The novel was used as a teaching aid on history courses at both the United States Naval Academy at Annapolis and, in Vietnamese translation, at the People's Defence University in Hanoi.

== Audio drama adaptation ==
In 2026, Saigon was adapted as an eight-part scripted audio drama by iHeartPodcasts, produced by Thoroughbred Studios and Goldhawk Productions. The series was directed by John Scott Dryden, who recorded it on location in Ho Chi Minh City, which he described as "central to capturing the spirit of the drama." Kelly Marie Tran, whose parents were Vietnamese refugees, stars in the series and said the story drew her in because of its themes of family separation and endurance across generations. Rob Benedict plays the lead role of Joseph. The series premiered on 22 April 2026 on the iHeartRadio app and other major podcast platforms, with new episodes released weekly on Wednesdays.
