= Anthony Grey =

British journalist and author (1938–2025)

Anthony Grey OBE
- Born: 5 July 1938; Norwich, England
- Died: 11 October 2025 (aged 87); Norwich, England
- Occupations: Journalist, writer
- Spouse: Shirley McGuinn (m. 1970; div. 1992)
- Children: 2
- Writing career
- Notable works: Saigon; Peking; Tokyo Bay; Hostage in Peking; The Prime Minister Was a Spy
- Website: anthonygrey.com

Anthony Keith Grey OBE (5 July 1938 – 11 October 2025) was a British journalist and author. While working for Reuters, he was imprisoned by the Chinese government for 27 months from 1967 to 1969. He wrote a series of historical novels and non-fiction books, including several relating to his detention like Hostage in Peking. He is best known internationally for his novels Saigon (1982), Peking (1988) and Tokyo Bay (1996), which have been translated into 16 languages worldwide.

== Career ==
=== Early career ===
Grey began his journalism career at the Eastern Daily Press in Norwich, where he overlapped with fellow journalist and future novelist Frederick Forsyth. He joined Reuters in 1964, and was posted first to East Berlin as the agency's East Europe correspondent during the height of the Cold War, working under surveillance by the Stazi, the East German secret police. He subsequently reported from Prague, Warsaw, Sofia and Budapest.

=== Detention in China (1967–1969) ===
In July 1967, while working for Reuters in Beijing covering China's Cultural Revolution, Grey was confined to the basement of his house by the Chinese government under the leadership of Mao Zedong, ostensibly for spying but really in retaliation for the colonial British government jailing eight pro-Chinese media journalists who had violated emergency regulations during the leftist riots in British Hong Kong.

China demanded the release of the eight to secure Grey's release. While the eight were eventually let go, China then demanded the release of a further thirteen Chinese people jailed in British Hong Kong. This was refused. Grey was able to communicate by mail with his mother and girlfriend back in England, but was only allowed two 20-minute visits by British consular officials in the first 17 months of his confinement, and was never formally charged. During his confinement, a group of Red Guards broke into his house and killed his cat.

He was released in October 1969, after 27 months of captivity. Upon his return to Britain, he was awarded the "Journalist of the Year" prize for 1969 at the IPC National Press awards, and an OBE.

Grey wrote about his two-year ordeal in Hostage in Peking, published in 1970. He later described the experience as having made him "the first modern international hostage of this era."

=== Later career ===
Grey published various stories and articles in such magazines as Playboy, Punch and The Illustrated London News. Between 1974 and 1979 he was a presenter on 24 Hours, a daily international affairs programme on the BBC's World Service.

In 1983, Grey published The Prime Minister Was a Spy, in which he claimed that Harold Holt (prime minister of Australia from 1966 to 1967) was a spy for Communist China, and that he had not drowned, but in fact had been "collected" by a Chinese submarine and lived out the rest of his life in Beijing. The book was widely ridiculed, and Holt's biographer Tom Frame has described it as "a complete fabrication".

He produced television documentaries for the British TV stations BBC and ATV World. These include Return to Peking in which he described changes in China since his imprisonment, and Return to Saigon, in which he visited Vietnam for the first time, subsequent to his successful novel Saigon.

In the late 1980s, Grey's experience as a political hostage led him to found Hostage Action Worldwide, which worked for the release of other political hostages, in particular John McCarthy, Brian Keenan, Terry Waite and others held by Islamic groups in the Middle East.

From the 1990s, Grey took an interest in UFOs. He produced a three-part documentary in 1996 and 1997 for the BBC World Service entitled UFOs - Fact, Fiction or Fantasy? His conclusion was that there is overwhelming evidence for visitations to earth by extra-terrestrials.

=== Saigon audio drama adaptation (2026) ===
In 2026, Grey's novel Saigon was adapted as an eight-part scripted audio drama by iHeartPodcasts, produced by Thoroughbred Studios and Goldhawk Productions. The series was directed by John Scott Dryden and recorded on location in Ho Chi Minh City. Kelly Marie Tran, whose parents were Vietnamese refugees, stars in the series alongside Rob Benedict, who plays the lead role of Joseph. The series premiered on 22 April 2026 on the iHeartRadio app and other major podcast platforms, with new episodes released weekly on Wednesdays.

== Personal life and death ==
In 1970, Grey married Shirley McGuinn (16 December 1932 – 24 November 1995), his girlfriend at the time of his imprisonment in China. They married in a private ceremony in St Ouen, Jersey, where Grey had gone to recuperate after his release, describing the island as "a paradisal setting" and "the cradle of my rebirth from newsman to an intermittent writer of fiction." They had two daughters, and divorced in 1992. From 1969 to 1973, the Greys lived in Jersey, and subsequently in London, West Sussex and Norwich.

He died from complications of Parkinson's disease in Norwich, on 11 October 2025, at the age of 87. His daughters Clarissa and Lucy Grey said: "He led his extraordinary life with great gusto, unending curiosity and boundless love. He was such a funny, vibrant and erudite man whose love for us was almost as deep as his love of words."

Obituaries were published by The New York Times, The Daily Telegraph, The Times, and BBC Radio 4's Last Word programme on 31 October 2025.

== Publications ==
Grey's publications include:

=== Fiction ===
Novels

- Some Put Their Trust in Chariots (1973)
- The Bulgarian Exclusive (1976)
- The Chinese Assassin (1978)
- Saigon (1982)
- Peking: A Novel of China's Revolution, 1921–1978 (1988)
- The Bangkok Secret (1990) based around the real-life mysterious shooting death of Thailand's King Rama VIII
- The Naked Angels (1990)
- A Gallery of Nudes (1992)
- Tokyo Bay (1996)
- The German Stratagem (1998)

Short story collections

- A Man Alone (1972)
- What is the Universe In? (2003)

=== Non-fiction ===
- Hostage in Peking (1970) recounting his experiences in Chinese captivity
- Crosswords from Peking (1975)
- The Prime Minister Was a Spy (1983)
- Hostage in Peking Plus (2008)
- The Hostage Handbook: The Secret Diary of a Two-Year Ordeal in China (2009)
