= Tokyo Bay (novel) =

Novel by Anthony Gray

Tokyo Bay, A Novel Of Japan
- Author: Anthony Grey
- Subject: Japan
- Genre: Fiction novel
- Publisher: Pan Macmillan
- Publication date: 1996
- Pages: 673 pages
- ISBN: 978-0-330-34918-5
- OCLC: 891595779

Tokyo Bay is a 1996 historical-romance novel by Anthony Grey. Grey said that he spent four years doing research for the book. Set in 1853 during the Perry Expedition, it portrays the events that follow when a US Navy officer disobeys orders and jumps ship to gather information about the Japanese.

== Plot ==
A fleet of two American steam-powered ships and a few conventional vessels enter Edo Bay, setting off panic among a people who have been sealed off from the rest of the world for over 200 years. Navy lieutenant Robert Eden, an idealistic New Englander, fears that the imperial intentions of his technologically advanced nation may ignite a violent conflict. Eden jumps ship with his loyal Japanese sidekick, Sentaro, who was rescued years earlier at sea by Americans. The lieutenant finds himself plunged into an entirely new world of menacing warriors, agitated Japanese who view Americans as monsters, and a geisha who's escaping from her job serving Japanese men of power. The two meet at a waterfall late at night and Eden saves her. They end up having sex and proclaiming their love for each other the first night. The rest of the novel deals with their romance and the unfolding events involving the American navy and officials representing the shogun.
