= Cheviot Beach =

Beach in Victoria, Australia

- Beach
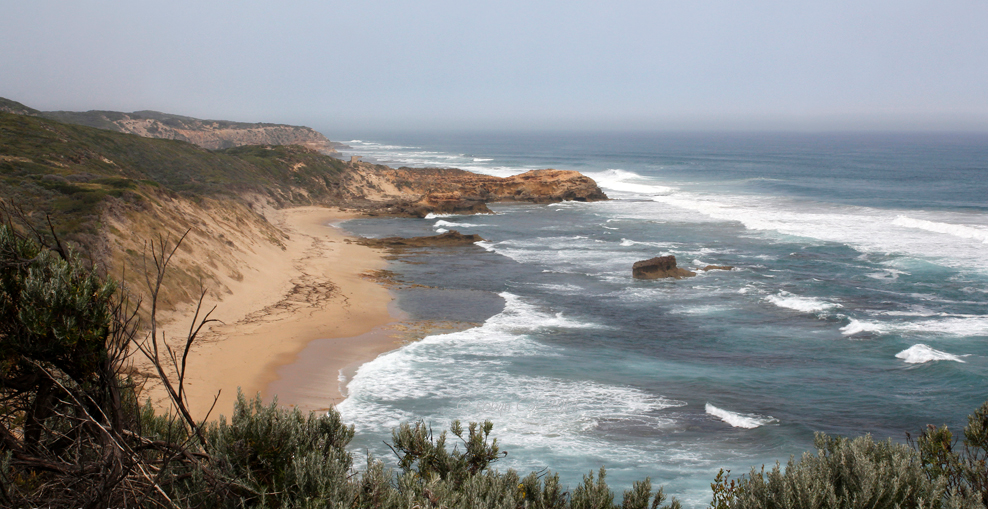

- Location within Melbourne
- Coordinates: 38.3117°S 144.6640°E
- Location: Portsea, Victoria, Australia

Cheviot Beach is a beach near Point Nepean in Victoria, Australia. It was named after the SS Cheviot, which broke up and sank nearby with the loss of 35 lives on 20 October 1887.

It was the site of the disappearance of Prime Minister Harold Holt; on 17 December 1967, Holt went swimming at the beach, disappeared, and was presumed drowned. He was last seen in the ocean and was then dragged under a wave, never to be seen again. His body was never recovered. Point Nepean had long been a restricted area, initially for quarantine and then later for defence purposes; at the time, it was used by the officer training school of the Australian Army, and Holt had reportedly been issued a special pass to use the beach.

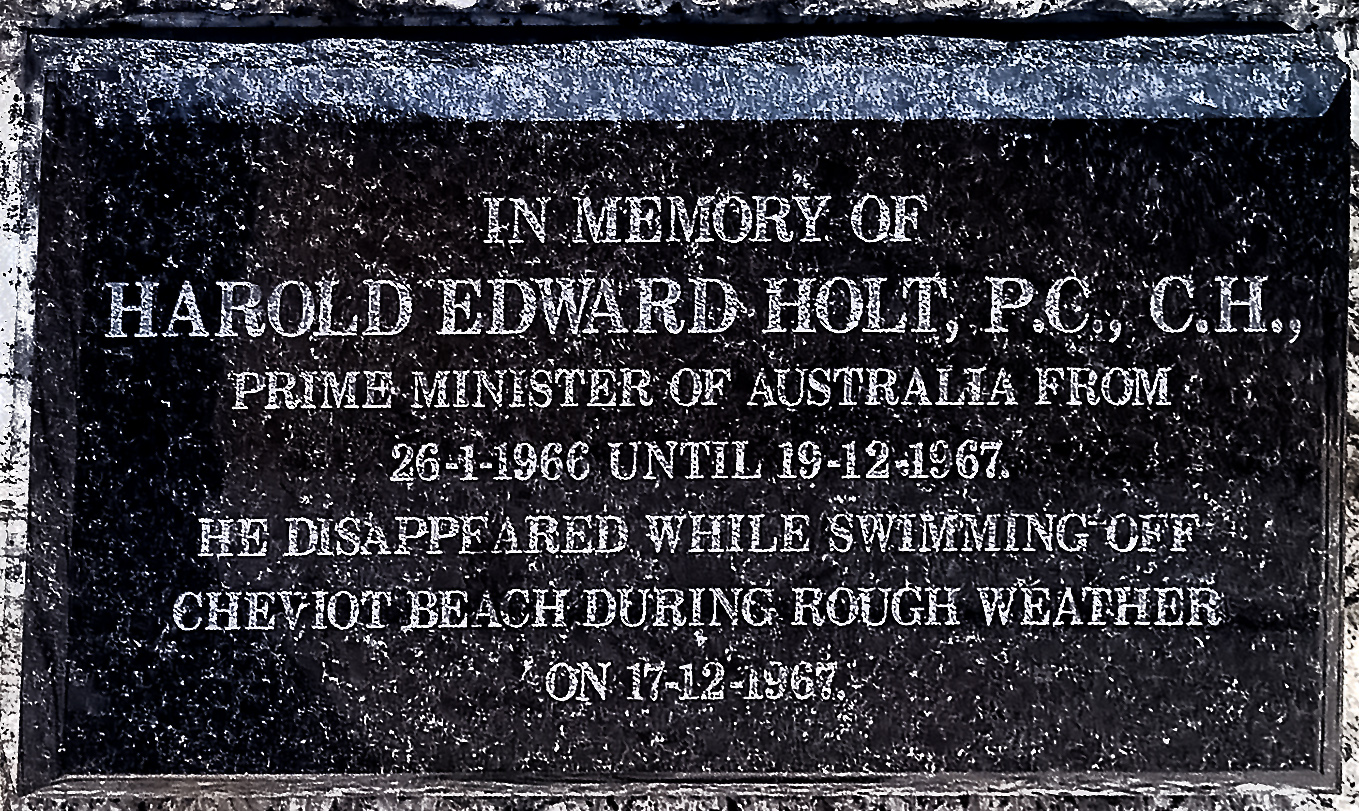
Harold Holt Plaque

A lookout and memorial to Holt overlook the beach on Cheviot Hill, accessible via a self-guided walk from Point Nepean; however, there remains no beach access, with swimming prohibited for safety reasons. Surf Life Saving Australia rates it as "extremely hazardous" for swimming, noting "at high tide the rocks and reefs lie immediately off the beaches and, as the tide drops, strong permanent rips intensify off the rocks and amongst the reefs."
