= SS Cheviot =

English steamer ship wrecked in Victoria

Coordinates: 38°18′51″S 144°39′51″E

History

Australia
- Name: SS Cheviot
- Owner: Howard Smith, Melbourne (1876–1887)
- Builder: Charles Mitchell and Co., Low Walker, Newcastle upon Tyne, England
- Launched: 1870
- Identification: Official number: 63648; Code letters: JTKP
- Fate: Wrecked, 19 October 1887

General characteristics
- Tonnage: 1,226 GRT; 764 NRT
- Length: 230 ft 2 in (70.15 m)
- Beam: 32 ft 2 in (9.80 m)
- Depth of hold: 17 ft 6 in (5.33 m)
- Propulsion: T. Clark & Co. compound steam engine
- Sail plan: Schooner-rigged

SS Cheviot was an iron screw steamer built by Charles Mitchell and Co., of Low Walker, Newcastle upon Tyne, England in 1870. She was owned by Wm. Howard Smith, Melbourne, Australia, for the transportation of coal and passengers. In 1887, she was wrecked in rough seas near Point Nepean in Victoria, Australia, with the loss of 35 lives, after the propeller was disabled. The beach nearby was subsequently named Cheviot Beach.

== The ship ==
The Cheviot was built by Charles Mitchell and Co., of Low Walker in Newcastle upon Tyne, England in 1870. It had a tonnage of 1,226 gross and 764 net, dimensions of 230.2 × 32.2 × 17.5 feet (70.2 × 9.8 × 5.3 m) in the hold and compound vertical direct acting engines built by T. Clark & Co. In 1876 the ship was registered in Melbourne to Wm. Howard Smith & Sons for use in the inter-colonial passenger and coal-carrying trade.

== Wreck ==
On the night of 19 October 1887, the Cheviot set out from Melbourne, bound for Sydney, and passed through the heads of Port Phillip Bay. At 8 p.m. and with a south-westerly gale blowing, the ship reached the open sea and the propeller became disabled. As a result, the unpowered ship drifted helplessly towards the shore. As the seas were too rough, it was decided not to launch lifeboats. Sails were set and anchors put out but to no avail as the ship struck the shore at 9 p.m. Rockets were sent up, and help arrived by boat within a few hours, but due to the rough seas the Queenscliff lifeboat was unable to get through the heads. At 4 a.m. the next morning rescuers were able to get a rocket-propelled lifeline to the ship and rescue 24 passengers and crew, however during this operation the ship broke up and sank with many people trapped in the fore-cabin.

== Aftermath ==
The captain, Thomas B. Richardson, was exonerated by the Steam Navigation Board and was praised for his attempts to save the vessel and those on board.

Eight of the victims were buried in the nearby quarantine station cemetery.

The site of the tragedy, which became known as Cheviot Beach, was the location of Prime Minister Harold Holt's disappearance and presumed drowning in 1967.
