= November 1967 =

Month of 1967

<<	November 1967					>>
Su	Mo	Tu	We	Th	Fr	Sa
			1	2	3	4
5	6	7	8	9	10	11
12	13	14	15	16	17	18
19	20	21	22	23	24	25
26	27	28	29	30

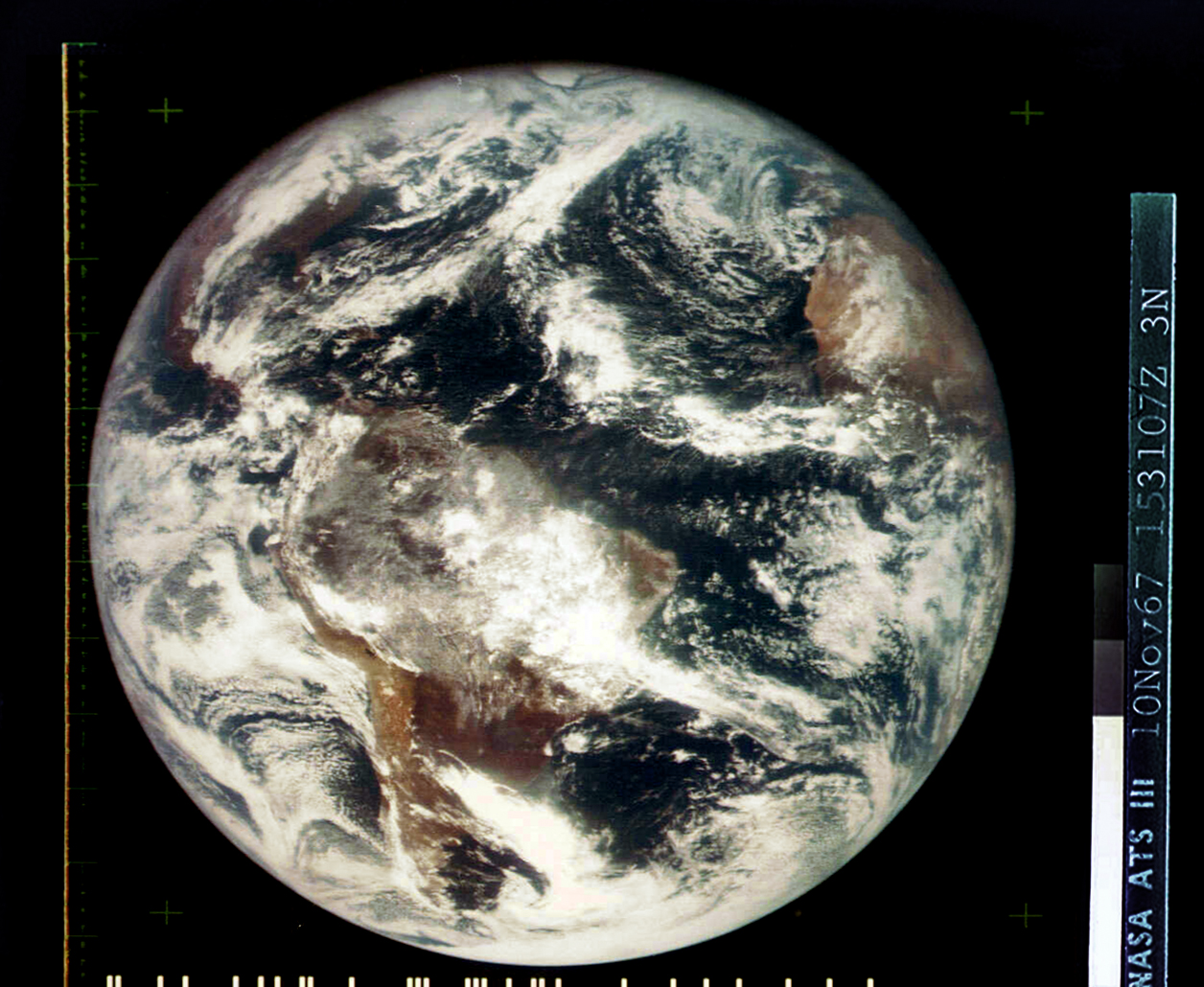
November 10, 1967: The first color photo of Earth's entire disk is made

The following events occurred in November 1967:

== November 1, 1967 (Wednesday) ==
- Arvid Pardo, the United Nations ambassador from Malta, delivered a historic speech before the General Assembly, describing Earth's oceans and seabed as "the common heritage of all mankind". Pardo, acknowledging that his small nation of Mediterranean islands was one of the smallest members of the U.N., stated that "We are, naturally, vitally interested in the sea which surrounds us," and noted that the Maltese people were concerned about "the truly incalculable dangers for mankind as a whole were the sea-bed and ocean floor beyond present national jurisdiction to be progressively and competitively appropriated, exploited and used for military purposes by those who possess the required technology." Pardo's speech would be the beginning of the process of getting the world's nations to agree upon what would become the United Nations Convention on the Law of the Sea.
- In Trento, a group of leftist Catholic students occupied university buildings, at the beginning of a violent wave of protests in the Italian campuses that would last for at least a decade. Many of Trento's protesters would play a primary role in the Italian New Left (Marco Boato, Mauro Rostagno) or in the Red Brigades (Renato Curcio, Mara Cagol).
- In India, the state of Kerala became the first in the nation to sell tickets for a state lottery, with each of the one rupee tickets (worth about 13 cents American) being eligible for the grand prize of 50,000 Indian rupees (equivalent to $6,700 U.S. dollars at the time) to be drawn on January 26, 1968.
- Nur Ahmad Etemadi became the new Prime Minister of Afghanistan after Mohammad Hashim Maiwandwal resigned for health reasons. Etemadi would serve until 1971, and would later be executed in 1979 for conspiring to overthrow the Afghan government.
- King Hussein of Jordan rejected a public proposal by Israel's Prime Minister Levi Eshkol for the leaders of the two neighboring nations to meet in person to begin peace talks. The statement came during a live interview in London on David Frost's talk show.
- President Houari Boumedienne of Algeria announced that, starting in 1968, compulsory military service would begin for all young men in the north African nation, a program that would give Algeria one of the largest standing armies on the continent.
- U.S. Secretary of Defense, Robert S. McNamara presented President Johnson with a gloomy projection for the next 15 months in the Vietnam War.
- Born: Tina Arena, Australian singer and stage actress; as Filippina Lydia Arena in Keilor East, Victoria
- Died: Benita Hume, 60, English actress, died from bone cancer.

== November 2, 1967 (Thursday) ==
- U.S. President Johnson held a secret meeting at the White House with a group of "former officials whose advice he trusted" and asked them to suggest ways to unite the American people behind the Vietnam War effort. The panel, referred to in later histories as "the Wise Men", included Dean Acheson, McGeorge Bundy, Clark Clifford, Henry Cabot Lodge Jr. and Maxwell Taylor, who urged the President to continue the war and to give the American people more optimistic reports on the war's progress, based on their conclusion that the U.S. was winning the conflict.
- In Portland, Oregon, African-American members of the International Longshore and Warehouse Union (ILWU) brought their first charges of racial discrimination against the union, asserting before the Equal Employment Opportunity Commission that the ILWU's referral system deliberately excluded black dockworkers from better jobs within the industry. It would take ten years for the case to come to trial, but in 1977, a federal court would find in favor of the Portland workers and would order the ILWU to eliminate its discriminatory practices.
- The Scottish National Party, an advocate for Scotland's independence from the United Kingdom, won a seat in the House of Commons for only the second time in its history, when Winifred Ewing defeated both the Labour Party and Conservative Party candidates in a by-election to fill a vacancy left by the resignation of Labour Party MP Tom Fraser. The SNP would win seats in the House of Commons in all general elections afterward.
- A ceasefire was negotiated between two warring organizations in the Guangdong Province of China, both created during the Cultural Revolution. The radical "Red Flag Faction" and the more conservative "East Wind Faction" of the Red Guards had been fighting since January.
- U.S. President Johnson addressed 1,000 delegates at "Consumer Assembly '67", and told them that the American people should urge Congress to increase taxes in order to stop price inflation.
- In Nuoro, at a checkpoint, the fugitive bandit Nino Cherchi killed traffic officer Giovanni Maria Tamponi with a machine gun burst. Six months before, on the same road, two policemen had been killed in a shooting with Graziano Mesina's gang. Tamponi was the sixth police victim of Sardinian gangsterism since the beginning of the year.
- A total eclipse of the sun took place, primarily over southern Africa and portions of Antarctica.
- Born:
  - Akira Ishida, Japanese voice actor, winner of the first Seiyu Awards for Best Supporting Character actor; in Nisshin, Aichi prefecture.
  - Chris Williams, American actor, voice actor and comedian known for a supporting role in the 2016 CBS TV series The Great Indoors

== November 3, 1967 (Friday) ==
- U.S. Defense Secretary Robert S. McNamara announced that the Soviet Union was developing a Fractional Orbital Bombardment System, a nuclear missile designed to be placed into low Earth orbit and to be brought back down on command to a selected target. The development raised the frightening prospect of a new arms race in outer space, with the weapons of the world's nuclear powers circling the globe and ready to destroy any target on short notice.
- The Battle of Dak To began about 280 miles north of Saigon and near South Vietnam's border with Cambodia. The largest concentration, up to that time, of North Vietnamese Army regiments had formed around the Dak To camp of the U.S. Special Forces. A defector from the north had tipped off the Americans, and General William Westmoreland ordered the U.S. 173rd Airborne Brigade, and divisions of the 4th Infantry and the 1st Cavalry to reinforce the 1,000 Americans already based at the camp. During three weeks of fighting, 361 American servicemen were killed, 1,441 wounded and 15 were missing in action.
- General Maxwell Taylor advised U.S. President Johnson to refute the advice of Secretary of Defense Robert S. McNamara given two days previously regarding conduct of the Vietnam War. Taylor's sentiments were echoed by U.S. Supreme Court Justice Abe Fortas and McNamara's replacement as Secretary of Defense, Clark Clifford.
- Garry Trudeau, a 19-year old sophomore at Yale University, began his career of publishing political commentary in cartoon form, with an editorial cartoon in the college newspaper, the Yale Daily News. While in college, Trudeau would later create a comic strip which, after his graduation in 1970, became the syndicated Doonesbury.
- Died:
  - Clare Hoffman, 92, United States Representative for Michigan for 14 terms, from 1935 to 1963)
  - Baburao Pendharkar, 71, Indian film director

== November 4, 1967 (Saturday) ==
- All 37 people on Iberia Airlines Flight 062 were killed when it crashed into a hillside while making its approach for a landing at London's Heathrow Airport. The twin-engine Sud Aviation Caravelle jet had taken off from Málaga Airport in Spain, and impacted in a forest on Blackdown Hill, near Fernhurst, West Sussex, about 40 miles (64 km) from its destination. The plane had been cleared to descend to 6,000 feet (1,800 m) and, for no discernible reason, steadily continued its descent.
- In the Congo, Belgian mercenaries led by Jean Schramme and Jerry Puren began a two-day withdrawal from Bukavu, over the Shangugu Bridge, to Rwanda. The four-month long mutiny had started on July 5 with an attack on Stanleyville by Schramme and 10 other mercenaries, who had soon been joined by 1,000 mutineering soldiers and rebels, and another 150 mercenary soldiers, and had claimed the lives of as many as 6,000 people.
- Egyptian President Gamal Abdel Nasser told former U.S. Secretary of the Treasury Robert B. Anderson that he was willing to agree to many of the requests of Israel to end the state of belligerence between the two nations following the recent Six-Day War but to do so officially would be suicide for any Arab leader. Anderson was in Cairo unofficially to meet with Nasser at the request of U.S. President Johnson.
- U.S. President Johnson spoke with former U.S. President Dwight Eisenhower on the telephone regarding recent diplomatic overtures with the National Liberation Front and the recent successful free elections in South Vietnam. Eisenhower communicated his support of Johnson's handling of the "unfortunate, but necessary" war in Vietnam.

== November 5, 1967 (Sunday) ==
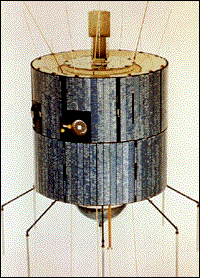
ATS-3

- ATS-3, the third of the Applications Technology Satellite geostationary weather and communications relays, was launched into orbit from Cape Kennedy at 6:37 p.m. from Florida. It was the first satellite with the capability of sending back full color images of the Earth. Designed to function for three years, ATS-3 would continue transmitting images until its deactivation on December 1, 1978.
- A railway accident killed 49 people and injured 78 when a British Rail express train derailed outside London near Hither Green. Most of the victims were on their way back to London after a weekend at the seaside resort in Hastings. A subsequent investigation would conclude that the piece of the rail which had broken was poorly supported and that while it had been adequate to support steam locomotives, "the smaller wheels of diesel and electric locomotives and units, combined with the high unsprung weight resulting from their axle-hung traction motors" had caused the tracks to wear out more quickly than forecast.
- A bloodless coup in the Yemen Arab Republic took place shortly after midnight, while President Abdullah al-Sallal was on his way to a state visit to the Soviet Union. The Yemeni Army seized control "without firing a shot" and installed a civilian-led presidential council headed by Judge Abdul Rahman al-Iryani. Sallal had been on his way to Moscow to attend the 50th anniversary of the Russian Revolution and to seek further aid for his regime after Egypt's recent withdrawal of troops; with news of the coup, he had his plane land in Baghdad and would spend the next 14 years in exile in Iraq.
- U.S. Vice President Hubert Humphrey was greeted by thousands of flag-waving locals when he arrived in Jakarta, Indonesia. The warm welcome was attributed to the hardline American policy on Communism.
- Born: Duilio Forte, Italian-Swedish architect; in Milan
- Died:
  - Robert Nighthawk (Robert Lee McCollum), 57, African-American blues musician, died of a heart attack.
  - Joseph Kesselring, 65, American playwright who wrote Arsenic and Old Lace

== November 6, 1967 (Monday) ==
- The Phil Donahue Show had its first telecast, initially as a local show on WLWD in Dayton, Ohio, Channel 2, at 10:30 in the morning. One historian would later credit Phil Donahue with "creating a new television genre: the daytime talk show. He dispensed with the typical band and, microphone in hand, left the stage to talk to the audience and, even more radically, unable to get the rich and famous to come to Dayton, he would feature ordinary people as guests." Donahue's very first guest was atheist activist Madalyn Murray O'Hair. Initially, the show would only be seen on the other five affiliates of WLWD's parent company, Avco Broadcasting Corporation; in 1970, it would be syndicated to non-Avco stations and would become the most popular daytime talk show in the 1980s.
- Two editorials were published simultaneously in China's Communist party periodicals, People's Daily, Red Flag and People's Liberation Army Daily, calling upon a new campaign during the Cultural Revolution to begin "rectifying the class ranks". The essays, "Marching Forward on the Road Opened by the October Socialist Revolution", and "The Theory of the Continuing Revolution under the Dictatorship of the Proletariat", would lead to a new purge of people accused of being "hidden class enemies".
- Cesare Merzagora, president of the Italian Senate since 1953, resigned his position and confirmed his departure when the assembly rejected his decision. Merzagora, an independent elected in the Christian Democratic lists, had been heavily criticized, both by the majority and by the Communist opposition, for a speech criticizing, not too subtly, the economical politic of the center-left government and the institution of the regions. After his departure, he would join the Liberal Group and come back to his old activity as a businessman. Two days later, Christian Democrat Ennio Zelioli Lanzini was elected President of the Senate.
- TWA Flight 159 skidded off the runway at the Greater Cincinnati Airport after the pilot aborted takeoff in the belief that the Boeing 707 had collided with a Delta Air Lines jet on the side of the same runway. The jet was preparing to fly to Los Angeles, but the quick reaction of the pilot prevented a catastrophe, and although all 36 people on board were evacuated, one of them died in the hospital later. Two weeks after Flight 159's near disaster, a TWA flight arriving at Cincinnati from Los Angeles would crash while attempting to land on the same runway, killing 70 people.
- Born:
  - Rebecca Schaeffer, American television actress and model, known for My Sister Sam; in Eugene, Oregon (murdered, 1989)
  - Pervin Buldan, Turkish-Kurdish politician and chair of Turkey's Peoples' Democratic Party; in Hakkâri Province

== November 7, 1967 (Tuesday) ==
Corporation for Public Broadcasting

- U.S. President Johnson signed the Public Broadcasting Act of 1967 into law, establishing the Corporation for Public Broadcasting. In his speech following the signing of the bill, President Johnson used the occasion to acknowledge the growth of communication over the previous century, and to describe his vision of the future. "I believe the time has come to enlist the computer and the satellite, as well as television and radio," Johnson said, "and to enlist them in the cause of education... I think we must consider new ways to build a great network for knowledge-not just a broadcast system, but one that employs every means of sending and of storing information that the individual can rise. Think of the lives that this would change. The student in a small college could tap the resources of a great university. The country doctor getting help from a distant laboratory or a teaching hospital; A scholar in Atlanta might draw instantly on a library in New York; A famous teacher could reach with ideas and inspirations into some far-off classroom, so that no child need be neglected. Eventually, I think this electronic knowledge bank could be as valuable as the Federal Reserve Bank. And such a system could involve other nations, too. It could involve them in a partnership to share knowledge and to thus enrich all mankind. A wild and visionary idea? Not at all. Yesterday's strangest dreams are today's headlines and change is getting swifter every moment. I have already asked my advisers to begin to explore the possibility of a network for knowledge--and then to draw up a suggested blueprint for it."

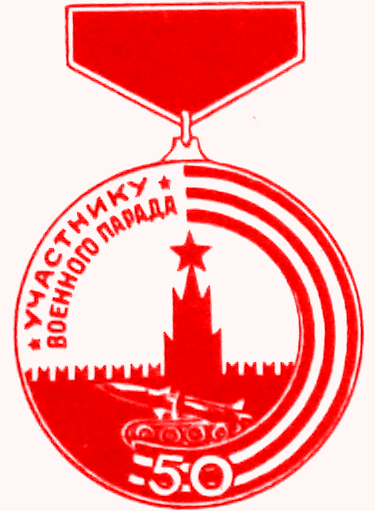
October Revolution 50th anniversary medal

- The Soviet Union celebrated the 50th anniversary of the Great October Socialist Revolution that had brought the Bolsheviks to power. During the annual parade through Moscow to display the latest Soviet weaponry, the Red Army showed "a new muscle in every major category... ranging from a massive three-stage intercontinental missile to a relatively tiny anti-tank missile on a reconnaissance car."
- The Supreme Court of Canada, by a 3 to 2 decision, upheld the Dominion's harsh sentencing law against homosexuality in the Criminal Code, and directed that George Klippert continue to serve "an indeterminate sentence up to life imprisonment". Klippert had been convicted of four charges of "gross indecency" for having consensual sex with other men, and the prosecutor pursued a classification under another code as "a dangerous sexual offender".
- Carl B. Stokes narrowly defeated his white opponent, Seth Taft, in voting for Mayor of Cleveland, to become the first African American to be elected mayor of a major United States city. Taft was a member of Ohio's powerful Taft family, and grandson of one-time U.S. President William Howard Taft; the final vote count was 129,825 for Stokes and 127,328 for Taft.
- The United Nations General Assembly voted unanimously (111–0, with no abstentions) to approve the Declaration on the Elimination of Discrimination Against Women, a non-binding resolution that initiated a United Nations drive toward working to support the rights of women.
- Dr. William Ferguson Reid became the first African-American since the 19th century to be elected to the all-white Virginia General Assembly.
- Richard G. Hatcher was elected the first African-American mayor of Gary, Indiana, which was, at the time, a large city of 175,000 people.
- Born:
  - Sharleen Spiteri, Scottish recording artist, songwriter and lead singer of the rock band Texas; in Finnieston, Glasgow
  - David Guetta, French DJ artist, songwriter and producer; in Paris
- Died: John Nance Garner, 98, Vice President of the United States from 1933 to 1941 and Speaker of the U.S. House of Representatives from 1931 to 1933;

== November 8, 1967 (Wednesday) ==
- President Johnson signed into law a bill that ended gender discrimination in the United States Armed Services for promotion to higher rank. Prior to the enactment of the law, women could not be promoted to the rank of general or admiral. The new law also eliminated previous limits on the number of female officers at each level from U.S. Navy captain and U.S. Army, Air Force and Marine colonels and lower commissioned officer ranks.
- BBC Local Radio, a network of FM radio stations owned jointly by the BBC and by the local government of the region where the transmitter was located, was inaugurated. The first of the eight commercial radio affiliates, Radio Leicester, went on the air as the first of eight local broadcasters.
- Born: Courtney Thorne-Smith, American TV and film actress; in San Francisco

== November 9, 1967 (Thursday) ==
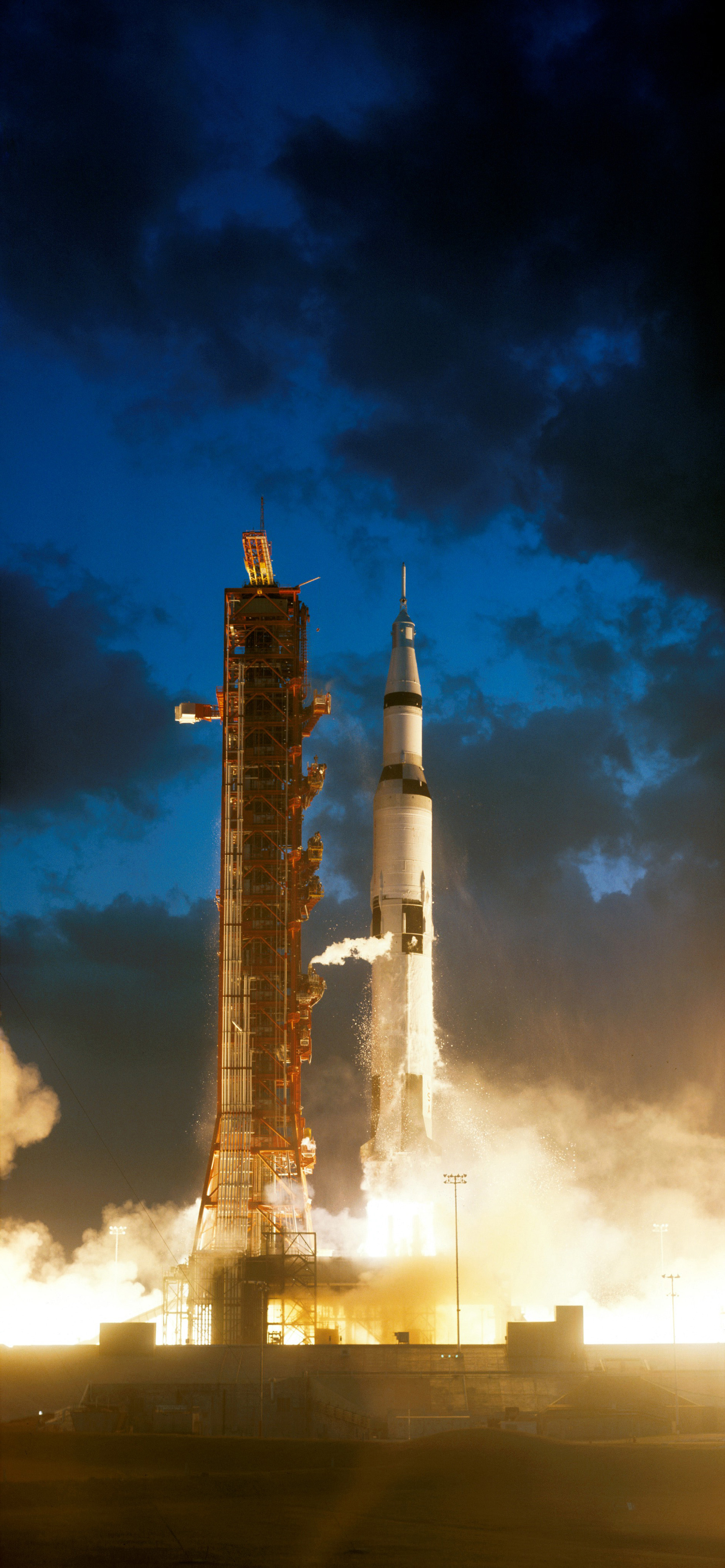
November 9, 1967: Launch of Apollo 4

- At 7:00 in the morning at Cape Kennedy in Florida, NASA successfully launched the powerful Saturn V rocket, propelling the uncrewed Apollo 4 test spacecraft into Earth orbit and resumed the Apollo program after nine months. The Saturn V, the most powerful rocket created, broke a record by lifting a payload of 285,000 pounds (129,000 kg), the combined weight of the Apollo 4 capsule and a mockup of the Apollo Lunar Module into orbit. The Apollo 4 craft reached an altitude of 11,386 miles (18,324 km) and then returned to Earth safely in a successful proof of its heat shield, which endured the friction of a high speed descent through the Earth's atmosphere and was picked up near Hawaii by the aircraft carrier USS Bennington. The launch was a validation of the "all-up" decision by the director of NASA's Office of Manned Space Flight, George Mueller, to flight test all three stages of the Saturn V rocket at the same time, rather than wasting resources and time by first launching the three stages individually. The noise from the powerful rocket was so loud that it shook the Launch Control Center and caused ceiling tiles to fall in the media site three miles away. NASA would subsequently engineer sound suppression into Saturn V rockets.

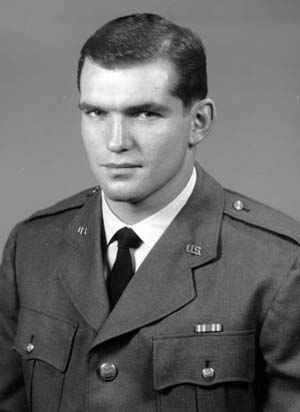
USAF Captain Sijan

- U.S. Air Force Captain Lance Sijan was shot down over North Vietnam, beginning an ordeal of survival that John McCain would later call "the most inspiring POW story of the war, a story of one man's peerless fidelity to our Code of Conduct". Captain Sijan had fractured his skull and left leg and suffered a brain concussion, but would evade capture until December 25. After one successful escape from a prison camp in January, he would be recaptured and tortured, finally dying of illness at the "Hanoi Hilton" camp on January 22. During his interrogations, however, he refused to reveal any information other than his name, rank and serial number. He would posthumously be awarded the Medal of Honor on March 4, 1976.
- Cardinal Paul-Émile Léger, the Roman Catholic Archbishop of Montreal, surprised the world by announcing his resignation from leading the largest Roman Catholic diocese in the British Commonwealth, in order to perform missionary work among lepers in central Africa. Cardinal Léger told a press conference that he had made his decision during the most recent synod of bishops in Vatican City, saying, "During the discussions on faith and atheism, my future became a question of conscience to me. It became clear to me that our Lord was asking me for deeds, as well as for words." As the New York Times noted, "Vatican observers could recall no precedent for a prince of the church giving up a major archdiocese to become a pastoral pilgrim among the sufferers of one of the world's most dreaded diseases."
- The first issue of Rolling Stone magazine, dated November 9, 1967, made its debut as a newspaper printed and distributed in and around San Francisco.
- Died: Charles Bickford, 76, American film actor nominated three times for the Academy Awards

== November 10, 1967 (Friday) ==
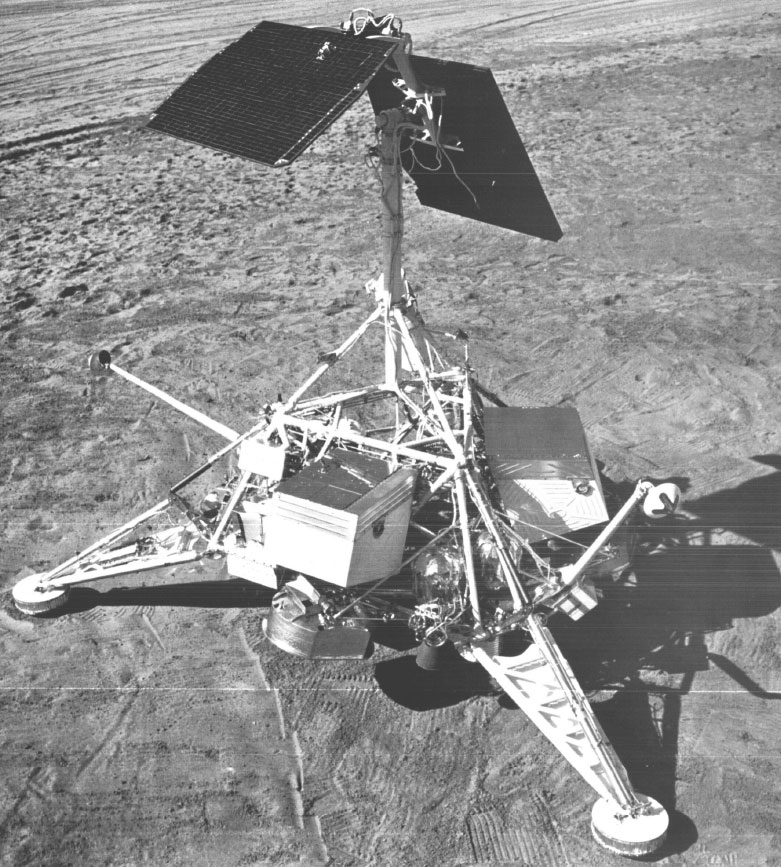
Surveyor 6

- The U.S. lunar probe Surveyor 6 made a soft landing on the Moon at 0101 UTC (8:01 p.m. November 9, Eastern Standard Time) and began transmitting the first of 29,952 television images back to Earth. At a press conference afterward, NASA program manager Benjamin Milwitzky said, "We have now satisfied all our obligations to explore beforehand the four equatorial sites believed safest for manned landings in the Apollo program." After touching down in the Sinus Medii, Surveyor 6 then became the first spacecraft to lift off from the Moon, briefly ascending in order to "hop" a few meters sideways, and providing the opportunity for three-dimensional (stereoscopic) images.
- ATS-3 transmitted the first color picture of Earth's entire disk (nearly all of the entire Western Hemisphere), after reaching a geostationary orbit of 22,236 miles (35,785 km) above the Equator and its intersection with the 47th meridian west, a point within 100 miles of the Brazilian city of Belém. "However," one author would note later, "this image failed to have a major impact on the media."
- Louis Washkansky, a grocery store owner in Cape Town, South Africa, had his first consultation with Dr. Christiaan Barnard at Groote Schuur Hospital in Cape Town, and volunteered to become the first recipient of a heart transplant from a human donor.
- The Nauru Independence Act 1967 received royal assent after passing both houses of the Parliament of Australia, allowing the Australian-administered United Nations trust territory of Nauru to proceed to independence on 31 January 1968.
- Jennifer Jones, 48, upset by her friend Charles Bickford's death, attempted suicide by barbiturate ingestion in Malibu; the evening before, she had called her private doctor, William Molley, confessing her intentions. Police, alerted by Molley, found Mrs. Jones on the beach, unconscious and about to be submerged by the rising tide. A timely gastric washout saved the actress' life.
- Died: Hulbert Taft, Jr., 60, Chairman of the Board of Taft Broadcasting Company, was killed in an ironic accident, dying from an explosion inside his own bomb shelter at his home in Cincinnati. According to a police spokesman, "Mr. Taft smelled a propane gas leak when he entered the shelter. He apparently reached up to pull a fuse block to cut off the electricity in the shelter. When he pulled the block, a spark developed and touched off the gas fumes.

== November 11, 1967 (Saturday) ==
- In Saigon, officials with General William C. Westmoreland's office told reporters that the estimated number of Communist forces in the Vietnam War had declined to 242,000 men, following the previous announced assessment of 299,000 and explained that the decrease was due to "heavy casualties and plummeting morale"; in reality, the decrease came because Westmoreland's command had decided in July that some categories of Viet Cong fighters should be dropped from the total estimate, which had been tallied at 299,000 at the beginning of 1967 in order to maintain the public position that Communist forces were less than 300,000. In 1975, a former CIA employee, Samuel A. Adams, would reveal the falsifying of numbers in testimony before the U.S. House Intelligence Committee. Adams would also reveal that his review of CIA documents indicated that the strength of the enemy had actually been 600,000 during 1967. Although the difficulties in attempting to put together an educated estimate of Viet Cong and North Vietnamese strength in South Vietnam was described in a CIA report on the subject as "we lack precise basic data on population size, rates of growth, and age distribution for both North and South Vietnam", "Our data and conclusions are therefore subject to continuing review and revision, especially since capabilities do not remain static."
- Three American prisoners of war were released by the Viet Cong, and turned over to American antiwar activist Tom Hayden in a ceremony in Phnom Penh, the capital of Cambodia. Sgt. Daniel Lee Pitzer had been taken captive in South Vietnam more than four years earlier, while Master Sgt. Edward R. Johnson had been gone for three years and Staff Sgt. James E. Jackson for two. The three U.S. Army sergeants were flown by a Czechoslovak airliner from Phnom Penh to Beirut in Lebanon, and then to Washington D.C., and then to Fort Bragg, North Carolina. It was suggested that all three POWs had been brainwashed during their period of captivity with the Viet Cong.
- While on board the carrier USS Enterprise for Veterans Day, U.S. President Johnson appealed to the North Vietnamese hierarchy in Hanoi to come to the negotiation table to search for a peaceful solution to the war in Vietnam. Predictably, the Hanoi regime once again rejected the prospect of negotiations a few days later.
- Twenty-five people were killed and 25 more seriously injured in Thailand's Mae Sariang when the truck that they were riding on plunged into a ravine. The truck was reportedly "overloaded with plants, animal hides and passengers" on the way to the city of Chiang Mai.
- British representative at the United Nations Lord Caradon met with his American counterpart, Arthur Goldberg, to discuss potential resolutions to be submitted to the Security Council that might be acceptable to both Israel and the Arab countries.
- Born: Gil de Ferran, French-born Brazilian race car driver and 2003 Indianapolis 500 winner (d. 2023); in Paris

== November 12, 1967 (Sunday) ==
- American Airlines Flight 455 from Chicago to San Diego was damaged by "a crudely made bomb" that exploded in the baggage compartment while the Boeing 727 was over Alamosa, Colorado. The jet, which had 81 passengers and crew on board, was able to land safely, despite the explosion, because most of the blasting caps rigged to a time bomb had failed to detonate. The FBI was able to trace the crime to Earle T. Cook, the manager of a bottling plant in Naperville, Illinois, whose wife had been one of the passengers among 78 intended victims. Cook would be sentenced to 20 years in a federal prison; FBI investigators concluded that the bomb had malfunctioned because of the cavalier handling of Mrs. Cook's suitcase by one of the airline's baggage handlers, who unwittingly saved 81 lives because his "rough handling of the bomb bag at O'Hare airport caused dislodgement" of the mechanism.
- The Association of African Universities was founded in Morocco by representatives of 34 higher institutions of learning at a meeting at the Mohammed V University in Rabat. Fifty years later, it would have 340 members.
- Born: Giovanni Tommasi Ferroni, Italian painter; in Rome

== November 13, 1967 (Monday) ==
- In Albania, the People's Assembly approved Decree 4337, annulling the 1950 statutes that guaranteed freedom of religion. By the end of the year, all places of worship in Albania were shut down, with the government closing 1,233 Sunni Muslim mosques; 608 Albanian Orthodox churches and monasteries; 327 Roman Catholic churches; and the nation's lone Jewish synagogue as part of Enver Hoxha's goal of making Albania "the world's first atheist state".
- Jerry Harkness, a player for the Indiana Pacers of the new American Basketball Association, set a record by scoring a basket from a distance of 92 feet (28 m) . Harkness and the Pacers were in Texas for a game against the Dallas Chaparrals (now the San Antonio Spurs). John Beasley had scored on a jump shot with one second left in the game to give the Chaparrals a 118 to 116 lead. Harkness received the inbounds from teammate Ollie Darden and hurled the basketball toward the opposite end of the court. "We were running off the floor to huddle up for overtime when the official, Joe Belmont, came up to me and said, 'Jerry, it's over. That was a 3-pointer.'" The Pacers won the game, 119–118.
- Four U.S. Navy sailors deserted the aircraft carrier USS Intrepid after it docked at the Yokosuka Naval Base in Japan, and fled to the Soviet Union. One week later, the four, all at the rank of U.S. Navy Airman, appeared on a Moscow television program that was transmitted throughout Eastern Europe, and said they would stay in the USSR. One of the four, Craig Anderson, said in a 1981 interview that "we were exploited by a group in Japan promoting their left wing ideology and later by the Russians".
- In Ohio, Carl B. Stokes was sworn in as the Mayor of Cleveland, becoming the first African-American mayor of a major American city to have been elected to the position. Stokes took the oath of office only six days after winning the election. On September 28, Walter E. Washington had been sworn into office as Mayor of Washington, D.C. but had been appointed to the job rather than being voted into office.
- The U.S. Joint Chiefs of Staff recommended to the White House to not agree to a proposed ceasefire during the upcoming Tết holiday period (January 27 to February 3, 1968) because of "the fraudulent manner in which the enemy has treated past ceasefires." President Johnson rejected the advice, and on January 30, the Viet Cong would launch a surprise attack, the Tet Offensive.
- The first of its many UFO sightings is made at Pudasjärvi, Finland.
- Born:
  - Jimmy Kimmel, American late-night talk show host and comedian; in Brooklyn
  - Juhi Chawla, Indian comedienne and actress; in Ambala, Haryana state
  - Steve Zahn, American actor; in Marshall, Minnesota
- Died: Harriet Cohen, 71, British pianist

== November 14, 1967 (Tuesday) ==
- Less than three months before the South Pacific island and UN Trust Territory of Nauru was scheduled to become an independent nation, the government of Australia concluded an agreement with the Nauru Local Government Council transferring all control of the island's primary industry, the mining of phosphate, to the Nauruans in return for payment of 21 million Australian dollars (roughly US$23,500,000 at the time).
- Born:
  - Letitia Dean, English TV soap opera actress who portrayed Sharon Watts on EastEnders; in Potters Bar, Hertfordshire
  - Max Pezzali, Italian singer in the duo 883 and later as soloist; in Pavia
  - Nicola Savino, Italian DJ and TV presenter; in Lucca
- Died: U.S. Marine Corps Major General Bruno Hochmuth, 56, the commander of the 3rd Marine Division operating in the DMZ in Vietnam, was killed along with four other Marines and a South Vietnamese Army aide when the helicopter in which he was riding accidentally exploded and crashed as he was approaching the city of Huế.

== November 15, 1967 (Wednesday) ==
- Former Greek Army General Georgios Grivas, commander of the Greek Cypriot National Guard, ordered an attack on the Turkish Cypriot villages of Kophinou (Geçitkale) and Ayios Theodhoros (Boğaziçi), killing 28 Turkish Cypriot civilians. The United Nations peacekeeping force was overpowered by the National Guard troops, who dismantled the UN's radio center and disarmed a force of UN soldiers who tried to intervene, triggering a crisis that almost led to a war between Turkey and Greece.
- U.S. Ambassador to Saigon Ellsworth Bunker visited President Johnson in Washington to give the President a first-hand account of the current situation in Vietnam.
- Born:
  - Pandeli Majko, Prime Minister of Albania from 1998 to 1999 and during 2002; in Tirana
  - François Ozon, French film director and screenwriter; in Paris

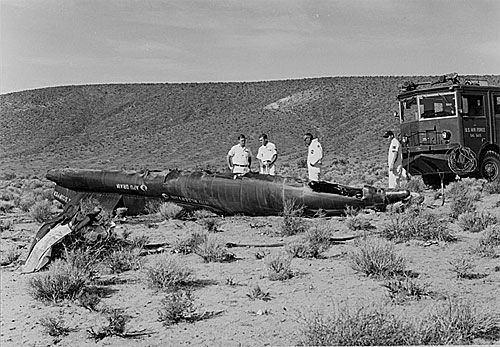
November 15, 1967: Firefighters survey the wreckage of Michael J. Adams' X-15

- Died: Major Michael J. Adams, 37, U.S. Air Force astronaut and test pilot, was killed while piloting the hypersonic X-15-3 rocket plane, in the only fatality of the X-15 program. The plane had been released over Nevada by a B-52 at 45,000 feet (14,000 m) at 10:30 in the morning. In less than three minutes, he had reached an altitude of 266,000 feet (81,000 m) — over 50 miles — and began having problems maintaining control. At 10:34, he reported "I'm in a spin," and 54 seconds later, the aircraft disintegrated. The X-15-3 was at an altitude of 62,000 feet (19,000 m) when it broke up while diving at a speed of 3,800 feet per second — 2,600 miles per hour (4,200 km/h) — with impact in the desert near Johannesburg, California.

== November 16, 1967 (Thursday) ==
- All 107 people on Aeroflot Flight 2230 were killed when the Ilyushin Il-18 crashed shortly after taking off from Sverdlovsk on a flight to Tashkent. The Soviet news agency Tass announced the accident four days later, giving no details other than that a Ilyushin-18, a four-engined turboprop airplane, had crashed in the Ural Mountains.
- Raúl Ferrero Rebagliati was named as the new Prime Minister of Peru by President Fernando Belaúnde Terry, and would serve until May 29 after being censured by the Peruvian Congress.
- The Canada Science and Technology Museum was opened to the public, near Ottawa, in a converted warehouse.
- The Grand National Assembly of Turkey voted, 432 to 1, to authorize the government to invade Cyprus.
- Aldo Aniasi was elected Mayor of Milan, serving until 1976.
- Born: Lisa Bonet, American TV actress known as Denise Huxtable on The Cosby Show and as star of its spinoff, A Different World; in San Francisco

== November 17, 1967 (Friday) ==
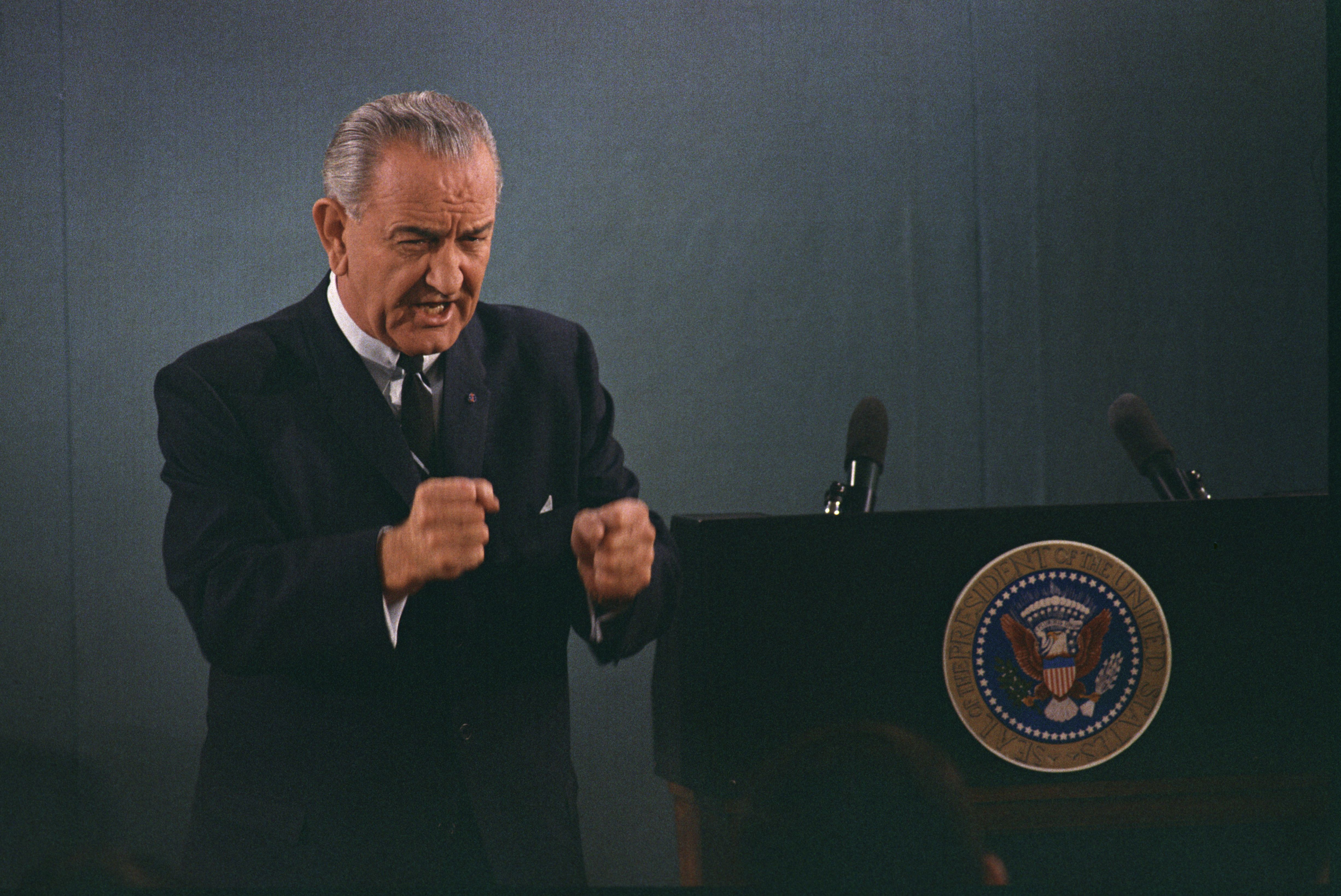
November 17, 1967: LBJ press conference

- Acting on optimistic reports he had been given by General William Westmoreland and by U.S. Ambassador to South Vietnam Ellsworth Bunker, President Johnson said at a press conference that his advisers had assured him that the war in Vietnam was going well, in response to a reporter's question, and that it was a different kind of conflict. "We don't march out and have a big battle each day in a guerrilla war. It is a new kind of war for us. So it doesn't move that fast... We are making progress. We are pleased with the results that we are getting. We are inflicting greater losses than we are taking." The President received positive reviews, with many newspapers calling it "Johnson's new style" while others said this was the "real Johnson" as the President bullishly informed Hanoi that the United States was prepared to protect their ally from invasion from an aggressive neighbor.
- French author and intellectual Régis Debray was sentenced to 30 years imprisonment in Bolivia by a military tribunal in the city of Camiri, after being convicted of having been a part of the late Che Guevara's guerrilla force. Debray and his co-defendant, Roberto Bustos, would both be released during the Christmas holiday in 1970, after a campaign from supporters worldwide, and he would be flown by the Bolivian Air Force to the city of Iquique in Chile. In 1973, Debray would be forced to flee Chile in the aftermath of the overthrow of Marxist President Salvador Allende.
- Only 11 people survived the crash of a bus that was making its regular run from Belgrade to the suburb of Obrenovac. The bus had been carrying at least 40 passengers, most of them women, when the driver attempted to pass a gasoline truck and lost control, sending the vehicle down into the Sava River. By the end of the day, 25 bodies had been recovered.
- In Milan, the students of the Catholic University, led by Mario Capanna, occupied the athenaeum to protest against a 50% increase in university taxes.

== November 18, 1967 (Saturday) ==
- The British pound was devalued by 14.3% to six-sevenths of its previous value, from an exchange rate of $2.80 USD to $2.40. James Callaghan, the Chancellor of the Exchequer, made the announcement in a statement released to the press, explaining that the devaluation, and other economic measures, had been prompted by the requirements of the International Monetary Fund for loans and credits to the United Kingdom of three billion U.S. dollars (£1.25 billion under the new exchange rate). The move came after a report showed that the trade deficit for October had reached a record high of £107 million. MP Robert Sheldon asked Callaghan to confirm that a one billion pound loan had been negotiated with foreign banks and when devaluation. Ireland and Denmark announced that they would soon cut the value of their currencies as well. The decision would trigger an economic crisis worldwide. Israel, Spain and Hong Kong would join in devaluation; New Zealand would devalue by 20% and Iceland by 24.6%; the U.S. Federal Reserve Board, though not devaluing its dollar, increased the discount rate to 4½% the next day, and would see a growth in inflation in 1968.
- The Viet Cong announced its willingness to honor a seven-day ceasefire during the Tet holiday celebrated as the start of the lunar new year in both North Vietnam and South Vietnam, for a period running from January 27 through February 2, 1968. The invitation, and its acceptance by the United States and South Vietnam, would be a prelude to the Tet Offensive; three days into the 1968 ceasefire, the Viet Cong and the North Vietnamese Army would stage a massive surprise attack against U.S. and South Vietnamese forces and their allies.
- NASA's Manned Spacecraft Center (MSC) proposed an alternative configuration for the "dry workshop" to be used for the orbiting space laboratory.

== November 19, 1967 (Sunday) ==
- A mistake by the pilot of an American F-100 fighter-bomber killed 42 U.S. Army paratroopers with Company C of the 173rd Airborne division, and wounded 45 others, after the F-100 flew in the wrong direction and dropped two bombs into the U.S. command outpost near Dak To Hill. The incident of "friendly fire" accounted for most of the American casualties that day during the fight for Hill 175 in the Battle of Dak To, with 72 total dead and 85 wounded.
- U.S. President Johnson wrote to Soviet Premier Alexei Kosygin, urging him to ensure Soviet support of the British resolution that potentially would be appearing before the United Nations Security Council in the next couple of days to start the peace process in the Middle East following the Six Day War.
- Newly elected South Vietnamese leader Nguyễn Văn Thiệu wrote to his North Vietnamese counterpart, Ho Chi Minh, to request secret talks to start a dialogue between the two countries to start the peace process.
- Died:
  - U.S. Army Major Charles J. Watters, 40, American chaplain, was killed by friendly fire while he was attempting to rescue wounded soldiers during the Battle of Dak To; he would posthumously be awarded the Medal of Honor.
  - Casimir Funk, 83, Polish-born American biochemist who synthesized the first synthetic vitamins

== November 20, 1967 (Monday) ==
- The crash of TWA Flight 128 killed 70 of the 80 people on board when it struck a hillside while attempting a landing at the Greater Cincinnati Airport in northern Kentucky. The Convair 880 jet was enroute from Los Angeles to Boston and shortly before 10:00 in the evening, and with a light snow falling, had been cleared for a landing on the airport's Runway 18. Because of construction work, the runway had no functioning approach lights, middle marker beacon or instrument landing system glide path system. Coming in roughly 430 feet (130 m) to the right of the path toward the runway, the jet struck trees about 1.75 miles (2.82 km) from its destination, skidded, and then disintegrated on impact.
- At 11:04:15 in the morning Washington, D.C. time, the "population clock" of the United States Census Bureau recorded the U.S. population at 200 million people. At the time, the clock, located in the lobby of the U.S. Department of Commerce, registered "a net gain of one person every 14½ seconds based on one birth every 8½ seconds, one death every 17 seconds, an immigrant every 60 seconds and an emigrant every 23 minutes".
- Three days before U.S. Secret Service protection was to expire for the widow and two children of the late U.S. President John F. Kennedy (after the end of the four-year mandatory protection for an American president and his family after the president leaves office), President Johnson signed a bill extending the protection (which cost $210,000 per year) for another 15 months, until March 1, 1969.
- Singapore issued its own coins for the first time, in denominations of one, five, ten, twenty and fifty cents and one Singapore dollar. After independence, Singapore had relied upon the Malaya and British Borneo dollar that had been the common currency during its membership in the Malaysian Federation.

== November 21, 1967 (Tuesday) ==
- Proclaiming that the United States had reached a turning point in Vietnam, U.S. Army General William Westmoreland told the National Press Club in Washington, "I am absolutely certain that whereas in 1965 the enemy was winning, today he is certainly losing." Westmoreland, commander of U.S. forces in the Vietnam War, said that "we have reached an important point... when the end begins to come into view", and forecast that a third phase of the war, when the U.S. would turn over control of the war effort to the South Vietnamese army, would start at the beginning of 1968. Daniel Ellsberg would write later about Westmoreland's statement, "Misleading as it was, I think he believed it; certainly he knew it was the message Johnson desperately wanted him to deliver. It was also the message many people desperately wanted to hear. Unfortunately for Westmoreland, it was to be refuted only two months later in a spectacular fashion— not by a skeptical press but by the actions of the Vietcong themselves when they launched a sweeping offensive on January 29, 1968, the start of Tet, the lunar new year celebration that was Vietnam's major holiday." The Viet Cong TET offensive, which saw the Viet Cong break an agreed ceasefire, ultimately ended in military defeat for the Communists.
- U.S. President Johnson signed the Air Quality Act into law, giving federal government jurisdiction over regulation of air pollution throughout the United States, but without requiring the same standards throughout the nation. The U.S. Department of Health, Education and Welfare was authorized to consult with state and local officials to designate "air quality control regions" (AQCRs) based on atmospheric conditions, and setting standards for quality within each AQCR.
- After 17 ministers of his United Front Party switched allegiance, Ajoy Mukherjee was dismissed as Chief Minister of India's state of West Bengal. Governor Dharma Vira appointed P. C. Gosch to replace Mukherjee. Political upheaval would continue and the state of West Bengal would be placed under President's rule on February 20, 1968.
- Born: Ken Block, American rally driver and co-founder of DC Shoes (d. 2023); in Long Beach, California
- Died:
  - Bruno Leoni, 54, Italian economist who introduced the ideas of the Austrian School of economic thought to Italy, was killed by Osvaldo Queri, whom he had entrusted in the management of a building. Leoni had confronted Queri about administrative irregularities. After clumsy attempts to hide Leoni's body, Queri was discovered. He would be sentenced to 24 years in jail.
  - Florence Reed, 84, American stage and film actress
  - C. M. Eddy Jr., 71, American horror story author

== November 22, 1967 (Wednesday) ==
- UN Security Council Resolution 242 was adopted, establishing a set of principles aimed at guiding negotiations for an Arab–Israeli peace settlement including the return of captured territories in return for the Arab nations' acknowledgment of Israel's right to exist as a nation. The wording of the resolution had been negotiated through the efforts of the United Kingdom's Ambassador to the United Nations, Lord Caradon. The resolution called upon Israel to withdraw from the territories that it had captured during the Six-Day War, and for the Arab nations to recognize Israel's right to exist; Egypt and Jordan accepted the resolution on the condition that Israel withdraw, Israel accepted provided that the Arab states negotiate directly with it and finalize a comprehensive peace treaty, and Syria rejected it altogether.
- General Westmoreland said at a press conference that the Battle of Dak To was "the beginning of a great defeat" for the Viet Cong and the North Vietnamese Army. "The enemy had planned to win a cheap war of so-called national liberation. But now the war has become enormously expensive for him. He has nothing to show for his investment. He has not won a significant battle in the south in the last one and a half years."
- In Italy, the Constitution was amended by Article 135. The terms of the Constitutional Court's judges were reduced from 12 to 9 years and their reelection was forbidden.
- Slightly more than one year after its creation, the state of Haryana in India was placed under President's rule after 44 of its state legislators defected from the ruling United Front party to other parties.
- Born:
  - Boris Becker, German tennis star who won six Grand Slam singles titles (Wimbledon 1985, 1986 and 1989; U.S. Open 1989; Australian Open 1991 and 1996), as well as WCT, ATP and ITF titles; in Leimen, Baden-Württemberg, West Germany
  - Bart Veldkamp, Netherlands-born Belgian speed skater and 1992 Winter Olympic gold medalist in the 10,000 meter race; in The Hague
  - Mark Ruffalo, American film actor and social activist; in Kenosha, Wisconsin

== November 23, 1967 (Thursday) ==
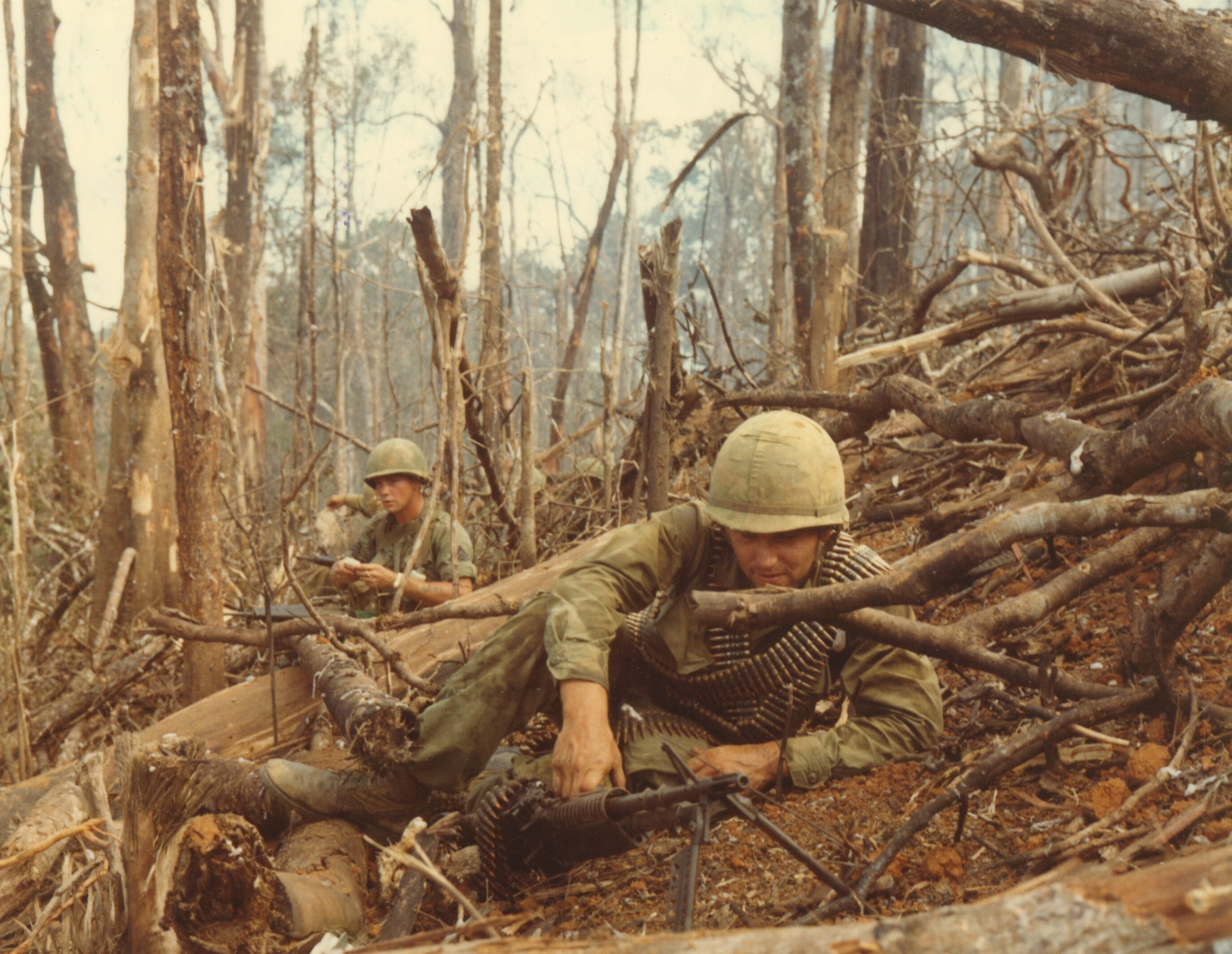
November 23, 1967: Assault on Hill 875

- After a five-day fight, American troops captured Hill 875 overlooking Dak To, in a one-hour charge on Thanksgiving Day to end the Battle of Dak To, one of the deadliest engagements of the Vietnam War. In all, 361 Americans were killed, 15 missing in action, and 1,441 had been wounded. The South Vietnamese Army suffered 73 deaths. The North Vietnamese and Viet Cong lost more than 1,200 troops, with an indeterminate number of wounded, indicating, as one historian would note, that "A loss rate of 4 to 1" was "clearly acceptable to the North Vietnamese leadership."

== November 24, 1967 (Friday) ==
- Plans to build a second deck for the famous Golden Gate Bridge in San Francisco were rejected permanently by a vote of 9 to 4 at a meeting of the directors of the bridge and highway district's governing board. For years, James Adam, the General Manager of the six-county district, had lobbied for turning the landmark into a double-decker highway bridge in order to relieve traffic congestion between the city and neighboring Marin County until board member Stephen C. Leonoudakis led the campaign to end the project and to seek expansion of mass transit and ferry services.
- In the aftermath of the devaluation of the British pound, frightened investors broke records for the second day in a row in the purchase of gold, and gold dealers in London reported that buying orders were "arriving in 'near panic' proportions from all over the world". In Paris, where the daily sales had averaged 2,460,000 U.S. dollars (12.3 million francs) before the devaluation, the sale on Friday was $12,560,000 (Fr 62,800,000); the trading in Johannesburg's gold exchange was "near pandemonium".
- The Chick-fil-A chain of shopping mall chicken restaurants was inaugurated by S. Truett Cathy, with the opening of a location inside the Greenbriar Mall to sell Truett's chicken fillet sandwiches. For its first 19 years, the chain would be limited to indoor shopping malls until inaugurating its first stand-alone location in 1986.

== November 25, 1967 (Saturday) ==
- Hundreds of people in the city of Chiquinquirá, in Colombia, were poisoned, and 81 died, after eating bread that had been made with flour that had been contaminated with parathion, a liquid insecticide. All but ten of the deaths were children; the deaths would later be attributed to an accident that happened when the flour and the parathion were being transported in the same delivery truck. When the truck driver made a sharp turn, three of the containers of parathion shattered and spilled into the bags of flour, which was then delivered to the bakery. Murder charges would later be filed against a Bogotá truck driver who had delivered the flour and the owner of the bakery that had baked and sold the bread to local residents.
- A heavy downpour that would lead to the deaths of 462 people began in Portugal at 6:00 in the evening. Falling on the area in and around Lisbon, 3.6 inches (91 mm) of rain came down in the next six hours, and another inch after midnight, causing the Tagus River and its tributaries to overflow. In the Lisbon suburb of Odivelas, 64 people were killed and 90 died in the village of Quintas, but most of the deaths came in Lisbon's slums, where three million of its nine million people lived.
- In Rimini, the first important meeting of the so-called "dissenting Catholics" was held, organized by the Marian Circle, about "The end of the Catholics' political unity, the social-democracy at the power and the perspectives of the Italian left". Present were Wladimiro Dorigo, Luigi Anderlini and Achille Occhetto.
- Iran's first nuclear reactor, the Tehran Research Reactor, was inaugurated at the Amir Abad campus of the University of Tehran. Shah Mohammad Reza Pahlavi had sought the reactor and construction of the structure had commenced in 1958.
- Born: Anthony Nesty, Trinidadian-born swimmer who won an Olympic gold medal competing for Suriname in the 100m butterfly; in Port of Spain

== November 26, 1967 (Sunday) ==
- In a meeting in Frankfurt, representatives of the central banks of the United States and six European nations joined to protect the price of gold from a worldwide buying rush and to preserve the worldwide price of $35 an ounce. The U.S. Federal Reserve Board, the Bank of England, West Germany's Deutsche Bundesbank, the Banca d'Italia, the De Nederlandsche Bank, the Swiss National Bank and the National Bank of Belgium worked together on a commitment to sustain the United Kingdom's collapsing currency and that of other economies. France, which had pulled out of the "gold pool" five months earlier and was blamed for trying to profit from the crisis, did not participate. Over the next four months, the banks would strive to keep the fixed price of gold at 35 U.S. dollars per ounce, but demand would rise "to panic proportions" in the spring of 1968 and the London gold market would temporarily close on March 15 to stop a further drain on its monetary reserves.
- On the Moon at Sinus Medii, the American Surveyor 6 lunar probe received commands from the Jet Propulsion Laboratory in Pasadena, California on Earth, to power down for hibernation during the 15 day "lunar night" when the surface around the landing site was not illuminated by the Sun. It would be reactivated on December 14 and operate briefly.
- Died: Albert Warner (born Aaron Abraham Wonsal), 83, Polish-born American film executive and co-founder of Warner Bros.

== November 27, 1967 (Monday) ==
- France's President Charles de Gaulle announced at a press conference in Paris that he would again veto the application by the United Kingdom to join the six-member European Economic Community, referred to in the press as the "Common Market". Citing the UK's balance of payments deficit and its problems with the pound sterling, de Gaulle said that British entry to the EEC "would obviously mean the breaking up of a Community which has been built and which functions according to rules which would not bear such a monumental exception." The first denial had taken place in 1961; the formal veto of the British application (and those of Denmark, Ireland, and Norway) would take place on December 19. The UK, Denmark and Ireland would become EEC members in 1973.
- Students at the University of Turin in Italy began a shutdown of the campus and triggered a protest movement that, in the spring of 1968, would see the student takeover of nearly all of the Italian universities. The issue at Turin had been an opposition to the university's authoritarian power over the students, and the protesters demanded that student assemblies be given "nothing less than full control over the curriculum, classrooms, and life of the university." The occupation of Campana Palace marked the spread of the Italian Protest movement, born in the Catholic universities of Trento and Milan, to the state universities. By May, similar student protests would be taking place around the world.
- For the first time in public opinion polls, New York U.S. Senator Robert F. Kennedy was favored by more people surveyed than incumbent U.S. President Johnson, in the Harris poll of likely Democrat voters of who they wanted to receive the 1968 Democratic Party nomination for President of the United States. More than half of the people surveyed, 52 percent, said that they preferred Kennedy, while 32 percent wanted to see Johnson renominated, and another 16 percent were undecided. However, the Harris poll was contradicted by the Gallup Poll, which showed Johnson's popularity rising, with most of Robert Kennedy's support coming from young people and women.
- The Beatles released their album Magical Mystery Tour in the United States, with the addition of new songs to those on the album's release (as a single EP) in the United Kingdom. Added to the U.S. release were "All You Need Is Love", "Penny Lane", "Strawberry Fields Forever", "Baby, You're a Rich Man" and "Hello, Goodbye". The double EP would go on sale in the UK on December 8.
- The Joint Chiefs of Staff presented Secretary of Defense Robert McNamara with their proposed plans for the next four months in the Vietnam War. The recommendations included not agreeing to a truce period during the upcoming Tet celebrations, a truce which the Viet Cong would famously go on to violate.
- The 303 Committee of the CIA proposed that the U.S. Ambassador to South Vietnam, Ellsworth Bunker, be allocated funds to be distributed throughout the South Vietnamese political structure to enhance the emerging parties as the country's fledgling democracy developed.
- Israeli Prime Minister Levi Eshkol requested through the U.S. Ambassador to Israel, Walworth Barbour, that the U.S. supply Israel with 77 fighter jets to counteract those supplied to Egypt by the Soviet Union.
- Cambodian Head of State Norodom Sihanouk reacted to U.S. press reports that the Viet Cong were using bases in Cambodia as sanctuaries by expelling all foreign journalists from the country.

== November 28, 1967 (Tuesday) ==
- Confirmation of the discovery of the first pulsar to be detected by Earth observers was made by astronomers Jocelyn Bell and Antony Hewish. Bell had first observed the object from the Mullard Radio Astronomy Observatory in Britain on August 6, when aiming a radio telescope at the constellation of Vulpecula. The stellar object was designated originally as Cambridge Pulsar 1919 (because of its coordinates of 19^{h} 19^{m} right ascension) and later referred to as PSR B1919+21. Confirmation was resolved by a fast strip chart recorder that showed the pulses to be occurring every 1.337 seconds.
- Born: Anna Nicole Smith, American model, actress and television personality; as Vickie Lynn Hogan in Houston (died of drug overdose, 2007)
- Died: Léon M'ba, 65, President of Gabon since its independence in 1960, died at the Gabonese Embassy in Paris. For the previous 16 months, M'ba had been undergoing cancer treatment in France. On December 2, M'Ba was succeeded by his vice president, Albert-Bernard Bongo (later Omar Bongo) who had been performing the executive duties during M'Ba's absence.

== November 29, 1967 (Wednesday) ==
- Colonel David Morgan and the 42 Commando the Royal Marines boarded helicopters at the RAF airfield at Khormaksar as the last of the British troops to depart from Aden. Colonel Morgan, the last of the unit to leave Yemen, shouted "Good luck!" to reporters, and the Marines were flown out to HMS Albion, bringing an end to 129 years of British sovereignty over the protectorate in southern Yemen and to the nearly four-year-long Aden Emergency. Control of the Aden Colony and the South Arabia Protectorate was turned over to Yemen's National Liberation Front at midnight, and the NLF proclaimed an independent republic. Humphrey Trevelyan, the last High Commissioner of Aden, would conclude in his report to British Foreign Secretary George Brown, "No one can be satisfied at the way in which we handed over the Colony of Aden without elections, to a party which had fought its way to power... But, given the situation in May 1967... the end might have been very much worse, and I do not believe that any action by us in the last months could have made it any better." He added "But in the end we went in peace and with dignity, and left behind a government which, however doubtful its antecedents, had relied principally on local support and has as good a chance as any South Arabian Government could have of administering the country in relative peace."
- WRESAT, the Weapons Research Establishment Satellite, was launched from the Woomera Rocket Range near Woomera, South Australia at 2:18 in the afternoon local time (04:48 UTC), as the Commonwealth of Australia became the fourth nation (after the Soviet Union, the United States, and France) to put a spacecraft into orbit. WRESAT would transmit data during 73 orbits of the Earth and remain in outer space for six weeks until re-entering the atmosphere and burning up on January 10, 1968.
- The collapse of the Sempor Dam in Indonesia killed 160 people in Central Java, with water and mud sweeping over three towns, including Magelang.
- U.S. Secretary of Defense Robert S. McNamara announced his resignation and accepted a post as the President of the International Monetary Fund, commonly known as the World Bank. His decision came after U.S. President Johnson rejected his recommendations to freeze troop levels, stop the bombing of North Vietnam, and hand over ground fighting to South Vietnam.
- In Italy, the first protest march against the Vietnam War, organized by Danilo Dolci, was concluded. Two columns of protesters, started from Milan and Naples on November 4, met in Rome, at the Fosse Ardeatine, and delivered a message to the Chamber of Deputies and to the United States Embassy papers, asking for the Italian government to cease its support for the war in Indochina.
- Ten days after he had made the decision to devalue the British pound, Chancellor of the Exchequer James Callaghan resigned. Home Secretary Roy Jenkins succeeded Callaghan at the financial position, and Callaghan took the position vacated by Jenkins.
- Died:
  - Ferenc Münnich, 81, Prime Minister of Hungary from 1958 to 1961
  - Theo Marcuse, 47, American character actor, was killed in an auto accident on the Hollywood Freeway near Barham Boulevard in Los Angeles "when his car struck the rear of a two-ton truck."

== November 30, 1967 (Thursday) ==
North Yemen

South Yemen

- With the departure of British troops hours earlier, the leaders of Yemen's National Liberation Front (NLF) declared the People's Republic of South Yemen at 12:01 a.m., with NLF leader Qahtan Muhammad al-Shaabi as the Marxist nation's first President. The creation of the People's Republic brought an end not only to the Aden Protectorate, but also the 16 sultanates that had constituted the British-protected Federation of South Arabia. "Nowhere else in the colonial empire", a historian would comment later, "had the British fought a losing war up to the last days before quitting and then been succeeded by so radical, Marxist-oriented and anti-British a regime as in Aden." The nation of South Yemen would exist until May 22, 1990, when it would merge with the Yemen Arab Republic (North Yemen) to create the Republic of Yemen.
- U.S. Senator Eugene McCarthy of Minnesota announced his candidacy for the 1968 Democratic Party presidential nomination, in a direct challenge to the renomination of President Johnson. McCarthy said that he would enter the presidential primaries in Wisconsin, Nebraska, Oregon and California, and that he would probably declare for New Hampshire and Massachusetts as well. Although McCarthy, ultimately, would not win the nomination, President Johnson would only narrowly defeat McCarthy in the March 12 New Hampshire primary (by a margin of only 230 votes) and would announce at the end of that month that he would not seek re-election.
- An earthquake along the border of Albania and Yugoslavia's Macedonian republic leveled most of the Yugoslavian city of Debar (now part of the Republic of Macedonia) and destroyed 2,000 buildings in the Albanian district of Dibër.
- Pro-Soviet communists in the Philippines established the Malayang Pagkakaisa ng Kabataan Pilipino (MPKP) as the Philippine Communist Party's new youth wing.
- At a convention in Lahore, Zulfikar Ali Bhutto founded the Pakistan People's Party, commonly known as the PPP, and became its first chairman.
- Within NASA, Apollo program director Samuel C. Phillips and Apollo Applications Program director Charles W. Mathews requested a study of refurbishing and reusing an Apollo Command Module after its return to Earth.
- Died: Allan T. Waterman, 75, American physicist and the first director of the National Science Foundation
