= October 1967 =

Month of 1967

<<	October 1967					>>
Su	Mo	Tu	We	Th	Fr	Sa
1	2	3	4	5	6	7
8	9	10	11	12	13	14
15	16	17	18	19	20	21
22	23	24	25	26	27	28
29	30	31

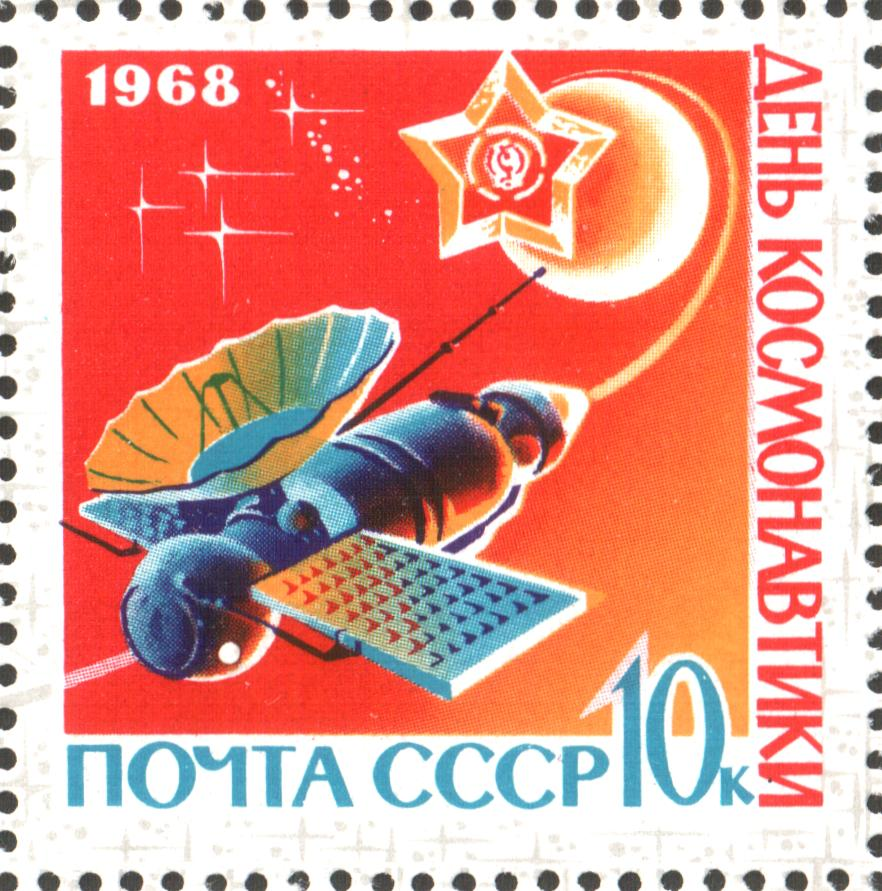
October 18, 1967: Venera 4 becomes first man-made object to land on Venus

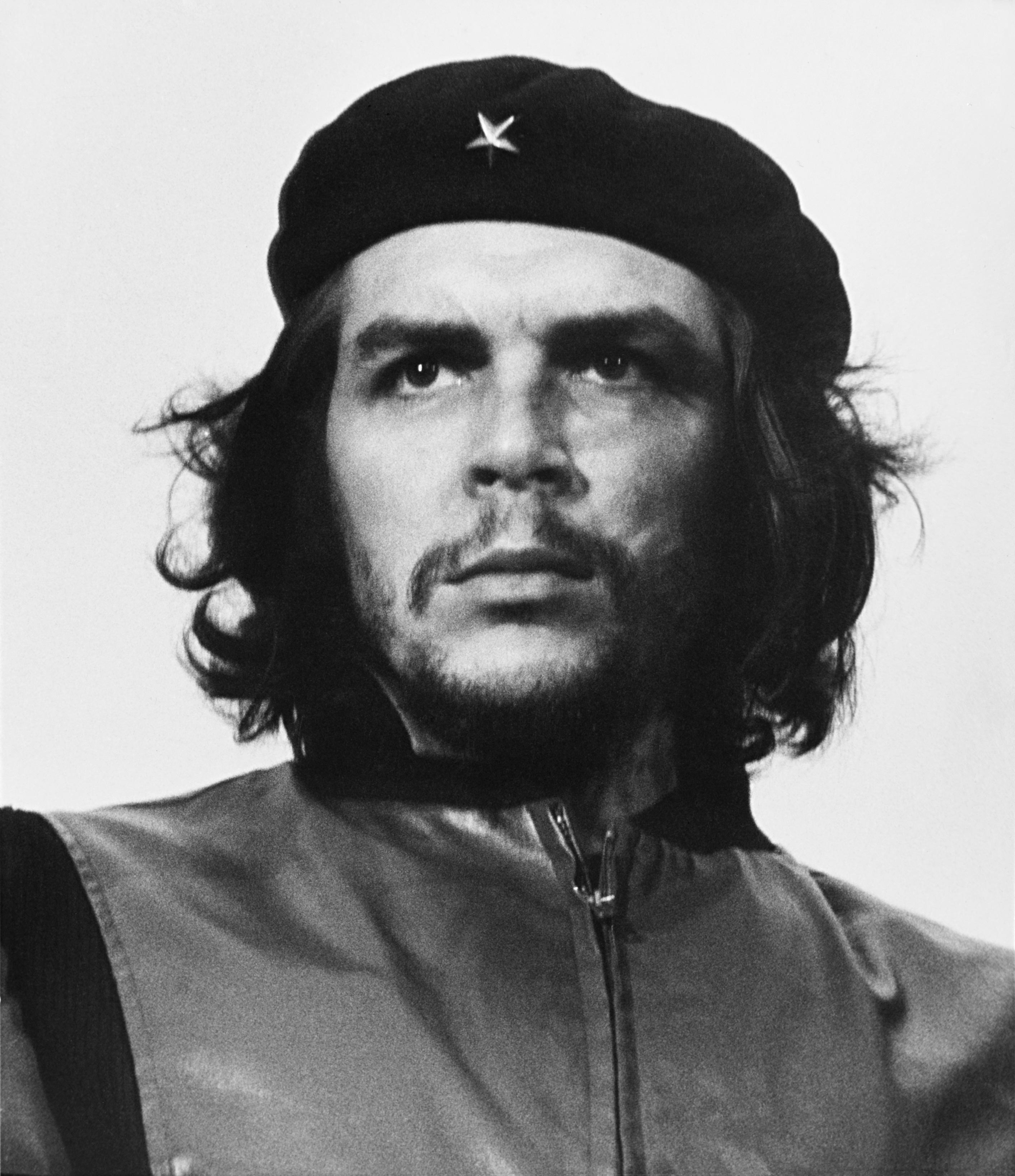
October 9, 1967: Che Guevara executed in Bolivia

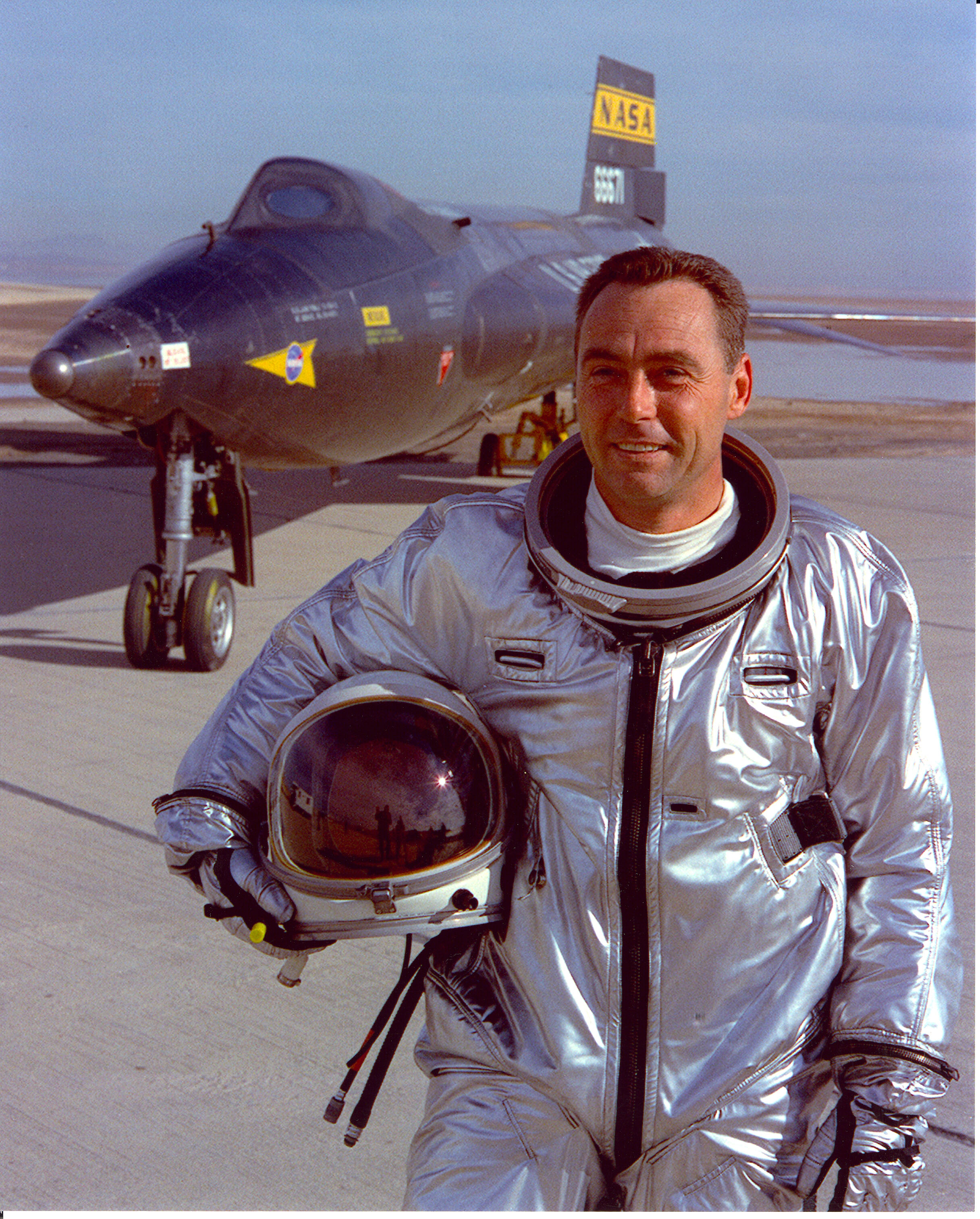
October 3, 1967: USAF Major Knight reaches Mach 6.72 in jet, still the fastest ever

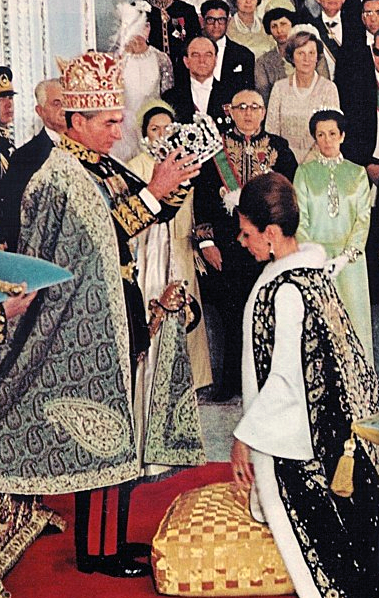
October 26, 1967: Shah Reza Pahlavi of Iran holds coronation for himself and his wife

The following events occurred in October 1967:

== October 1, 1967 (Sunday) ==
- The final day of the regular season in baseball's American League came down to a game between the Boston Red Sox and the Minnesota Twins, who both had 91–70 records after Boston's 6–4 win the day before. The Detroit Tigers were at 90–70 going into their final two games, and could have forced a playoff if they could win both parts of their doubleheader against the California Angels. Boston beat Minnesota, 5–3, in a game that ended at 3:25 in the afternoon Eastern Time, to finish at 92 wins and 70 losses. Eighty minutes later in Detroit, the Tigers had a 91–70 record after a 6–4 win over the Angels, and baseball fans watched to see whether the Tigers could win their last game; unfortunately, the Angels took a five-run lead after five innings, and would hold on for an 8–5 win.
- Representatives of the world's communist nations had been invited to a celebration in Beijing to mark the 18th anniversary of the October 1, 1949 takeover of China by the Communists, but China's second-in-command, Lin Biao, gave an address that was described as having "rude anti-Soviet attacks and outbursts against the international communist government." With that, the Soviet guests walked out, and were joined by those from Bulgaria, Czechoslovakia, East Germany, Hungary, Mongolia and Poland.
- Color television was introduced in France at 2:15 in the afternoon on the ORTF's second channel, La deuxième chaîne, which used the SECAM (Séquentiel couleur à mémoire) technology. Only 1,500 households in France had color televisions at the time; within a year, 200,000 color sets were used in France.

== October 2, 1967 (Monday) ==
- As the United States Supreme Court began its new term, Thurgood Marshall joined the court as the Court's first African-American justice. Although a swearing-in ceremony was held, Marshall had already taken the oath of office on September 1. He would serve for 24 terms of the Court, announcing his resignation on June 27, 1991, and died on January 24, 1993.
- NASA Deputy Administrator Robert C. Seamans Jr. resigned, effective January 1, 1968. He had joined NASA in 1960 as an Associate Administrator, and became Deputy Administrator in 1965.
- England, Wales and Northern Ireland adopted a judicial procedure that was already in place in Scotland, allowing for jury verdicts by less than a unanimous decision. Thereafter, juries could decide a case by a 10–2 or an 11–1 margin.
- Greece's military government placed former Greek Prime Minister Panagiotis Kanellopoulos under house arrest after he issued a public appeal for democracy.
- Lesotho Airways made its first flight, taking off from Maseru in Lesotho to Johannesburg in South Africa in a Douglas DC-3.
- Born: Frankie Fredericks, track and field athlete, and the only Olympic medalist from Namibia; winner of silver medals in the 100m and 200m races in 1992 and 1996; in Windhoek

== October 3, 1967 (Tuesday) ==
- United States bombers struck targets in North Vietnam as close as 10 miles (16 km) from Communist China, striking the Loc Dinh highway bridge, the Bao Dang highway bridge 15 miles (24 km) from the frontier, and the Ha Thuoc railroad yards, the northernmost penetration that American bombs had been dropped in Vietnam.
- Carl B. Stokes became the first African-American to win a primary election for mayor of a large American city, defeating incumbent mayor Ralph S. Locher of Cleveland in the Democratic primary. Stokes would win in November against Republican candidate Seth Taft.
- Flying an X-15 experimental aircraft, U.S. Air Force Major William "Pete" Knight made the fastest flight of a powered aircraft, at a speed of Mach 6.72 (4,520 miles (7,270 km) per hour). The mark remains unsurpassed.
- The National Assembly of South Vietnam voted, 58 to 43, to approve the results of the September 3 presidential election won by Nguyễn Văn Thiệu.
- North Vietnam rejected a proposal by U.S. President Lyndon Johnson to discuss peace. The decision was announced in the Hanoi newspaper Nhan Dan.
- Britain's Royal Navy commissioned its first Polaris ballistic missile submarine, HMS Resolution.
- NASA Headquarters issued a revised Apollo Applications Program (AAP) schedule incorporating recent budgetary cutbacks. The schedule reflected the reduction of AAP lunar activity to four missions and of Saturn V Workshop activity to 17 Saturn IB and 7 Saturn V launches. There would be two Workshops launched on Saturn IBs, one Saturn V Workshop, and three Apollo Telescope Mounts (ATMs). Launch of the first Workshop was scheduled for March 1970.
- Born: Rob Liefeld, American comic book creator; in Anaheim, California
- Died:
  - Pinto Colvig, 75, American voice actor known for being the original voice of the Disney character Goofy
  - Woody Guthrie, 55, American folk singer and songwriter, died of Huntington's disease.
  - Malcolm Sargent, 72, British orchestra conductor

== October 4, 1967 (Wednesday) ==
- The Shag Harbour UFO incident occurred in the Canadian province of Nova Scotia on the tenth anniversary of the Sputnik launch, as "an illuminated object, sixty feet in diameter, descended from the sky and disappeared beneath the waves" in front of numerous witnesses, including a constable of the Royal Canadian Mounted Police. A Canadian Coast Guard vessel rushed to the impact point and found a "thick yellow foam" 80 feet wide at the crash site. Acting on the possibility that the object had been a crashing airplane, Canadian Navy divers conducted a four-day search of the harbor for wreckage but found nothing.
- The cliché of "a bull in a china shop" was played out literally in the town of Chester, Pennsylvania when three steers escaped from Medford's Inc., a slaughterhouse and meatpacking plant, and "caused a considerable amount of damage to the china and other valuable items in a downtown jewelry store." The three animals raced a few blocks up Market Street (now Avenue of the States) and onto Edgmont Avenue, then charged into the Morris Jewelry Store. No people were injured, but the steers smashed display cases on their way back out.
- The formerly German parcel of land Verenahof was officially transferred to Switzerland, along with an equal amount of formerly Swiss land being transferred to Germany.
- Sultan Omar Ali Saifuddin III of Brunei abdicated in favor of his son, Hassanal Bolkiah, but would remain an adviser to the nation's new ruler until his own death in 1986.

== October 5, 1967 (Thursday) ==
- Pacific Ocean Park, located in Santa Monica, California, was closed down by a bankruptcy trustee. The park had been operating only on weekends during its final months of operation, and its last actual day had been on Sunday, October 1. Nicknamed "P.O.P.", the amusement park had opened in 1958 and had pioneered the concept of allowing visitors to get on rides as often as they wished after paying for admission, which was promoted by using "P.O.P." to stand for "Pay One Price".
- The Maiskoe-Ashgabat–Bezmeyn natural gas pipeline, 2,750 kilometres (1,710 miles) in length and under the management of the Soviet Ministry of Gas Industry, began its first deliveries of natural gas from the Turkmen SSR (now Turkmenistan) in Central Asia through the Russian SFSR.
- Born: Guy Pearce, British-born Australian film actor; in Ely, Cambridgeshire

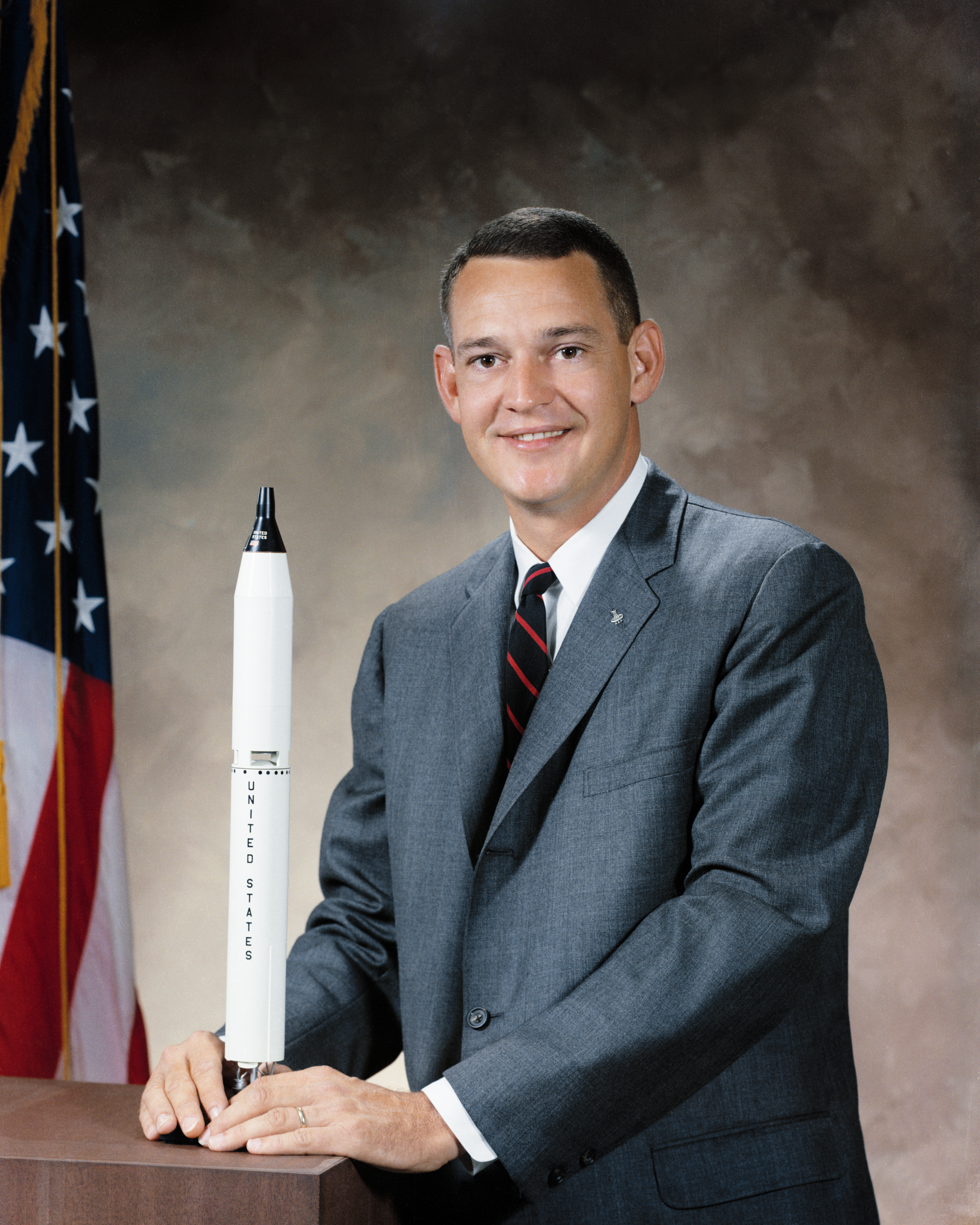
Astronaut Clifton Williams

- Died: USMC Major Clifton C. Williams Jr., 35, American astronaut, was killed while piloting a T-38 jet plane from Patrick Air Force Base in Florida to the Brookley Air Force Base in Alabama. Major Williams had been one of 14 men chosen for NASA Astronaut Group 3, and would have been the lunar module pilot for Apollo 12 in late 1969. He would be replaced by Alan Bean for the mission.

== October 6, 1967 (Friday) ==
- Three students at Duke University became the first people to be certified as a physician assistant (PA). Kenneth Ferrell, Victor Germino and Richard Scheele, each of whom had been a medical corpsman in the United States Navy, had entered the two-year experimental program in 1965 after the American Medical Association had granted permission to Dr. Eugene Stead to implement the proposal by Dr. Charles Hudson.
- The Canadian record for heaviest rainfall in 24 hours was set at the town of Ucluelet, British Columbia, located on the west coast of Vancouver Island, with 489 millimeters (19.25 inches) of precipitation from a downpour that had started the day before.
- The government of South Vietnam implemented its new policy toward student protesters by drafting 12 demonstrators into the South Vietnamese Army.
- Born: Attila Ambrus, Hungarian folk hero nicknamed "The Whiskey Robber" for his predilection for drinking whiskey before carrying out his heists of banks, post offices and other businesses during a six-year career between 1993 and 1999; in Fitod, Harghita County, Romania

== October 7, 1967 (Saturday) ==
- Film actress Elizabeth Taylor escaped death by a matter of seconds while in Sardinia for the filming of the Universal Pictures release Boom!. Taylor had just stepped out of a trailer that served as her dressing room in the hills of the Porto Conte Natural Park, when the vehicle's brakes and safety blocks failed, sending it plunging over a 150-foot high embankment and into the Mediterranean Sea.
- The National Development Council that decided domestic policy in India was reorganized to include the Prime Minister and all cabinet ministers, the Chief Ministers of all states and territories, and members of the Indian planning commission.
- Saad Jumaa, who had served as Prime Minister of Jordan since before the Six-Day War, resigned to return to the diplomatic corps, and was replaced by former Prime Minister Bahjat Talhouni.
- The Central Committee of the Chinese Communist Party issued a directive banning unscheduled, hostile demonstrations against foreigners.
- Born: Toni Braxton, American R&B singer; in Severn, Maryland
- Died:
  - Ruby Doris Smith-Robinson, 25, African-American civil rights activist and Executive Secretary of the Student Nonviolent Coordinating Committee, died of cancer
  - Norman Angell, English author and politician, winner of the 1933 Nobel Peace Prize

== October 8, 1967 (Sunday) ==
- Guerrilla leader Che Guevara was captured by the 2nd Battalion of the Bolivian Rangers. Only 17 guerrillas were left when the Rangers surrounded them in the El Yuro Ravine near La Higuera; Guevara ordered his men to split into two groups and attempt to fight their way out. Minutes later, a bullet grazed Guevara's leg and he was unable to run. The distraction from the excitement of his capture allowed the other men to escape.
- China's Communist Party and its State Council issued an "urgent circular" directing all government institutions to "send all young intellectuals and others down to work in the villages and up to the mountains, with a permanent assignment to remain in the countryside and spread the revolution and grasp production"; over the next three years, as many as 30,000,000 "educated youth" would be relocated to rural areas.
- Meeting in Washington, D.C., the Democratic National Committee voted unanimously to hold the 1968 Democratic National Convention in Chicago, a choice that would prove to be disastrous.
- Died: Clement Attlee, 84, Prime Minister of the United Kingdom from 1945 to 1951

== October 9, 1967 (Monday) ==
- A cyclone struck the Orissa state in India, killing 531 people and leaving almost one million people in the Cuttack and Balasore districts homeless; the storm arrived without warning shortly before noon and continued for more than ten hours. Among the casualties of the flood were 38 people on a Maharashtra State Transport bus that was washed away by floods about five miles outside of Koregaon. The bus had been carrying 60 passengers on a route from Satara to Nimsod when it was washed into a culvert. Only 22 people were pulled to safety, while 14 bodies were recovered and another 24 people were missing.
- The U.S. freighter Panoceanic Faith sank off the coast of Alaska, drowning 35 of the 40 crew. Nearly all of the deaths were from hypothermia, because the men on board had time to launch only one life raft before the boat was capsized by 20 foot (6.1 m) waves. The freighter was 870 miles (1,400 km) from Kodiak, Alaska, when its skipper radioed for help. A Japanese ship, the Igaharu Maru picked up two survivors, and the Norwegian ship Visund saved the other three.
- Che Guevara, who had been captured the day before, was executed following an interrogation at the schoolhouse in the village of La Higuera. In order to avoid the publicity of a trial, Bolivia's President René Barrientos ordered that Guevara be put to death. Army Sergeant Mario Terán carried out the task, shooting Guevara nine times with a semiautomatic rifle, in order to support news that Guevara had been killed in battle.
- Ground control at NASA deliberately crashed the American space probe Lunar Orbiter 3 onto the Moon's surface after eight months in orbit and the receipt of more than 600 high resolution photographs of the surface. Rockets were fired on the probe in order to bring it down on the far side of the Moon. Two days later, NASA would do the same with Lunar Orbiter 2.
- The United States bombed the previously off-limits Can Bi airfield near Haiphong for the first time during the Vietnam War, while other American bombers flew within 15 miles of the Communist Chinese territory to knock out a bridge.
- Born: Eddie Guerrero, American professional wrestler; in El Paso, Texas (died of heart failure, 2005)
- Died:
  - Joseph Pilates, 83, German physical trainer who developed the pilates exercise regiment that bears his name
  - Sir Cyril Hinshelwood, 70, English physical chemist and 1956 Nobel Prize in Chemistry laureate
  - Gordon Allport, 69, American psychologist and pioneer in personality psychology
  - André Maurois, 82, French historian, novelist and author

== October 10, 1967 (Tuesday) ==
- The Outer Space Treaty between the United States, the Soviet Union, and 10 other nations took effect at a ratification ceremony held at the East Room of the White House. U.S. President Lyndon Johnson and Secretary of State Dean Rusk signed on behalf of the U.S., while ambassadors from the other nations (including Anatoly Dobrynin for the USSR and Sir Patrick Dean for the UK) signed on behalf of their countries. The parties agreed that they would not place nuclear weapons in space, and pledged to not establish military bases, nor make territorial claims, on the Moon or any other celestial bodies.
- Egypt's President Gamal Abdel Nasser ordered the release of all ministers of the Kingdom of Yemen who had been held in detention since their capture in the North Yemen Civil War.
- Born: Gavin Newsom, 40th Governor of California since 2019; in San Francisco
- Died: Bernard Floud, 52, British Member of Parliament for Acton and television executive, committed suicide by carbon monoxide poisoning in his home after being denied a security clearance by the British intelligence agency, MI5.

== October 11, 1967 (Wednesday) ==
- Hamdi Cana'an, the Palestinian mayor of Nablus in the West Bank, requested a special meeting with Israel's Defense Minister Moshe Dayan after three weeks of sanctions against the city in response to its civil disobedience. Since September 22, the Israeli Army had enforced a 14-hour curfew that required everyone to be off of the streets at 5:00 in the afternoon and to remain inside until 7:00 the next morning, and the city telephone system had been shut down, and soldiers carried out searches of homes and businesses. The next day, the Israelis prohibited anyone from entering or leaving Nablus. Mayor Cana'an agreed to call off the month-long boycott by Nablus businesses after Dayan told him that "The choice you have is either orderly life or rebellion, but you should know that if you choose rebellion, we'll have no other option but to break you."
- The body of Che Guevara was buried in an unmarked grave by the Bolivian Army at the airfield in Vallegrande. Prior to his burial, the hands were severed at the request of the government of Argentina, for comparison of his fingerprints to Argentinian police records to verify his identity. The burial site was then paved over with concrete to build an airport runway. Almost 30 years later, the skeletons of Guevara and five other people would be found on June 28, 1997, in an excavation of the burial site and would be returned to Cuba after being positively identified.
- Five of the six expansion teams in the National Hockey League made their debut on the same evening, as the original six NHL teams were reconstituted as the league's Eastern Division, and the six new teams were in the Western Division. In their first games, the Pittsburgh Penguins lost to the Montreal Canadiens, 2–1; the California Seals beat the Philadelphia Flyers, 5–1; and the Minnesota North Stars and the St. Louis Blues played to a 2–2 tie.
- Two days after NASA deliberately crashed Lunar Orbiter 3 onto the Moon's surface, it did the same to Lunar Orbiter 2. A press release from NASA the next day said that its purposeful crash of the two probes had been directed from commands sent from the Langley Research Center at Hampton, Virginia, in order "to free their radio frequencies for future use".
- The Boston Red Sox forced a seventh game in the World Series with an 8–4 win over the St. Louis Cardinals.
- Born:
  - Peter Thiel, German-born American entrepreneur, billionaire and philanthropist; in Frankfurt
  - Tazz (ring name for Peter Senercia), American professional wrestler; in Brooklyn
  - Artie Lange, American comedian; in Livingston, New Jersey
- Died:
  - Yatuta Chisiza, 41, former Minister of Home Affairs for the southern African nation of Malawi, was shot and killed by government security forces only days after he had re-entered the country to lead a coup against Malawian President Hastings Banda. The next day, the President ordered Chisiza's bullet-riddled body to be placed on public display.
  - Stanley Morison, 78, British typographer who designed numerous fonts, including Times New Roman

== October 12, 1967 (Thursday) ==
- All 66 people aboard Cyprus Airways Flight 284 were killed when the Comet jet crashed into the Mediterranean Sea while on its way from Athens to Nicosia. The jet, with 59 passengers and a crew of seven, was at an altitude of 29,000 feet (8,800 m) and was 13 minutes away from its destination when an explosion sent it plummeting. Falling 5 miles (8.0 km), the jet struck the water near the Greek island of Kastellorizon. Traces of an explosive were found in one of the seat cushions, suggesting that a bomb had been placed beneath one of the passengers, but no theory for a motive was ever confirmed.
- The St. Louis Cardinals defeated the Boston Red Sox, 7 to 2, to win the World Series in the deciding 7th game. Bob Gibson, who had pitched the Cardinals to wins in Game 1 and Game 4, allowed only three hits in winning Game 7.
- Israeli settlers established their first kibbutz in the Golan Heights territory recently captured from Syria, moving into the abandoned Syrian village of Quneitra to form the Israeli settlement of Merom Golan.
- U.S. Secretary of State Dean Rusk announced during a news conference that Congressional proposals to start a peace initiative would be futile, because of North Vietnam's opposition.
- The Naked Ape, by Desmond Morris, was first published.

== October 13, 1967 (Friday) ==
- U.S. President Johnson signed Executive Order 11375, expanding affirmative action programs to women in an effort to end gender discrimination within the U.S. government. The Federal Women's Program was established from the order "to enhance opportunities for women in every area of federal employment."
- The American Basketball Association, a challenger to the NBA, played its very first game. Willie Porter of the Oakland Oaks scored the first ABA points, and the Oaks went on to a 132–129 win over the Anaheim Amigos at the Oakland Coliseum in front of 4,828 fans.
- Malawi's President Hastings Banda signed an order banning the operations of the Jehovah's Witnesses within the southern African nation as "an unlawful society dangerous to the good government of Malawi."
- The Royal Navy frigate HMS Brighton arrived at Gibraltar, beginning a permanent presence of British guardships to protect the British territory from harassment by neighboring Spain.
- The Catholic University of Portugal was established by the Holy See at the request of the conference of Portuguese Bishops, and would receive governmental recognition on July 15, 1971.
- A bus crash killed 25 people and injured 14 when the vehicle they were in fell into a ravine near İzmir in Turkey.
- Born:
  - Javier Sotomayor, Cuban track and field athlete, and, as the only person in the world who has made a vertical jump of eight feet, holder of the world record for the high jump since 1988; in Limonar
  - Trevor Hoffman, American baseball pitcher for 19-years; in Bellflower, California
  - Kate Walsh, American actress; in San Jose, California
  - Hannu Lintu, Finnish symphony conductor; in Rauma

== October 14, 1967 (Saturday) ==
- The Holland America Line became the first cruise line to abolish tipping aboard its passenger ships and freighters. The company instead raised the wages of its employees and the cost of a cruise to passengers.
- The Chicago Bulls, the 10th and newest franchise of the National Basketball Association, played their very first game, a 105–90 loss to the Boston Celtics.

== October 15, 1967 (Sunday) ==
- Michigan Governor George Romney publicly responded to an article in the New York Law Journal, which had concluded upon a review of judicial interpretations of the natural-born-citizen clause in the U.S. Constitution, at Article II, section 1. Romney had been born to American parents while they were in Mexico in Chihuahua City. Romney, who was considering a campaign for the Republican Party nomination for president in 1968, said in Detroit, "I didn't do anything to be an American citizen except to be born. I am a citizen naturally born."
- A bus crash killed 21 people in the Philippines, and injured 40 others. The vehicle, carrying partygoers, fell off of a bridge and into the Nyyt River near Catarman, Northern Samar . Survivors said that the bus driver, who escaped the bus and fled the scene, had appeared to have been drunk.

== October 16, 1967 (Monday) ==
- "Stop the Draft Week" was launched in front of the induction centers of 30 American cities, by thousands of people protesting against the Vietnam War. At Oakland, 600 demonstrators blocked the entrance of that city's center, including folk singer and activist Joan Baez, who was one of 125 people arrested. At New York City, 300 demonstrators blocked center entrances. Buses brought protesters to Boston, where 70 draft cards were burned and 200 cards turned over to clergymen of the Unitarian Universalist Church. Similar anti-draft protests took place in Los Angeles; Chicago; Washington, D.C.; San Francisco; Philadelphia; Minneapolis; Portland, Oregon; Albany, New York; and Ithaca, New York;, where people either attempted to give their draft cards back to federal authorities, or burned them. According to one account, over 1,000 cards were turned in during the week, and "by the end of the war, 600,000 men had violated the Selective Service laws", with only 3 percent actually prosecuted.
- Forty-two people, most of them women who were on a sightseeing tour of Buddhist temples in South Korea, were killed when their bus plummeted off of a 40-foot cliff near Gimcheon (Kimchon). The driver and the other 10 passengers on board were seriously injured.
- Born: Davina McCall, English television host; in Wimbledon, London

== October 17, 1967 (Tuesday) ==
- The first "rock musical", Hair, premiered at the theater inside the Astor Library in New York City's East Village. Featuring a "multiracial cast of hippies", and attracting attention with "the full-frontal nudity of the cast" to close one scene, the show combined the music of Galt MacDermot and the lyrics of James Rado and Gerome Ragni, and was sold out for each of its performances during its six-week trial run. It would also become "the first Off-Broadway musical to transfer successfully to Broadway".
- In the Battle of Ong Thanh, sixty-four soldiers in the U.S. Army's 28th Infantry Regiment were killed and 75 wounded in an ambush by the Viet Cong.
- Born:
  - Dmitry Peskov, Russian politician and current Kremlin Press Secretary (since 2012); in Moscow, Russian SFSR, Soviet Union
  - René Dif, Denmark singer and songwriter for the group Aqua; in Copenhagen
  - Venus Terzo, Canadian film, television and voice actress; in Vancouver

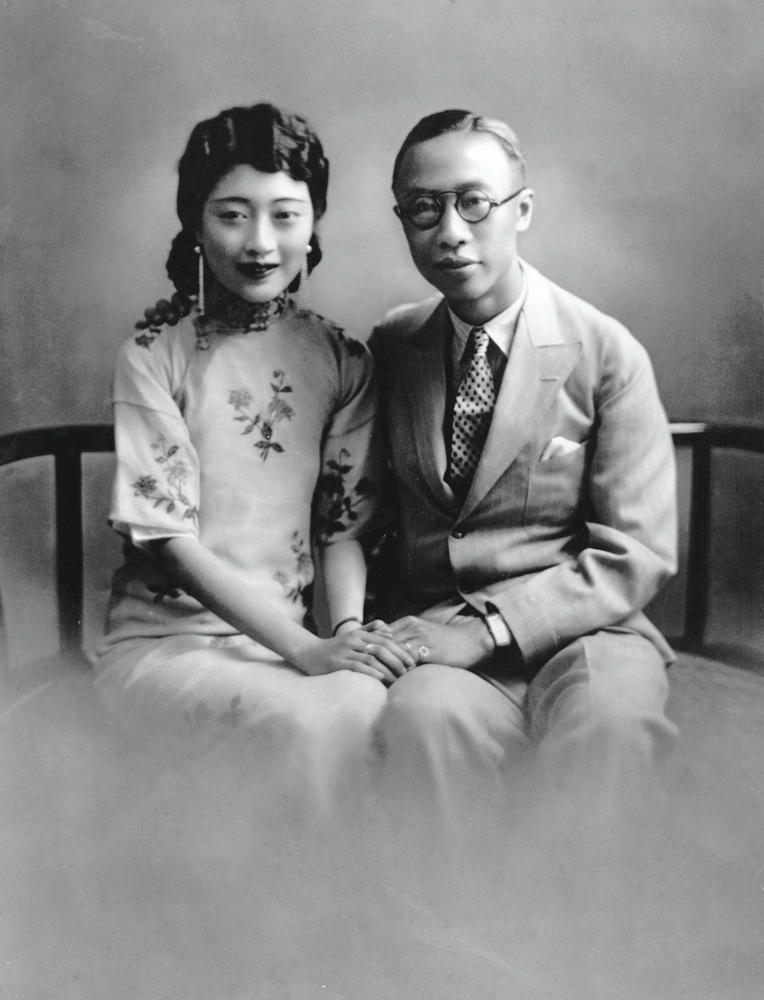
The last Emperor of China

- Died: Hsuan-t'ung, 61, the last Emperor of China (1908–1912), and the only monarch of the Japanese puppet state of Manchukuo (1932–1945). Known informally as Puyi, he served 14 years in prison as a war criminal, then was pardoned and given a nominal job by the Communist Chinese government as an assistant editor for a party magazine. In that he had no children, his heir as head of the House of Aisin Gioro was his younger brother, Pujie, who would live until 1994.

== October 18, 1967 (Wednesday) ==
- The Soviet Union's Venera 4 probe became the first craft from Earth to land on Venus. The Soviets initially reported that the probe transmitted signals for 94 minutes as it descended through the Venusian atmosphere, starting at 10:14 a.m. Moscow time (0734 UTC), and continued until a crash landing. According to the TASS news agency announcement, the Venus probe only stopped transmitting after it impacted the ground and sent back data that the surface temperature of Venus was 280 °C (536 °F), that the atmospheric pressure was 15 times that of Earth, and that the atmosphere of Venus was composed primarily of carbon dioxide. Subsequent reports dropped the claim of transmitting from the surface after scientists worldwide pointed out that some of the metals used in satellite instruments would melt at a 280 degree Celsius temperature, and reports two years later would note that "It is generally agreed that Venus 44 did not reach the surface intact."
- Baseball's American League owners voted to allow the Kansas City Athletics, owned by Charles O. Finley, to relocate to California as the Oakland Athletics starting in 1968, and to expand from ten teams to 12 no later than 1971 by adding a new Kansas City team (the Kansas City Royals) and a team in Seattle (the Seattle Pilots, who would later relocate as the Milwaukee Brewers). According to a later account, the move of any team required two-thirds approval, and only got six of ten votes on the first ballot (with Baltimore against and 3 abstaining), but the New York Yankees added a seventh vote on the next round.
- The Nobel Prize committee announced in Stockholm that Haldan K. Hartline, George Wald and Ragnar Granit would share the Nobel Prize in Physiology or Medicine for their discoveries on the visual processes of the eye.
- Students at the University of Wisconsin–Madison demonstrated over the efforts of Dow Chemical to use the university campus for recruiting new employees; 76 people would be injured in the ensuing riot.
- Walt Disney's 19th full-length animated feature The Jungle Book, the last animated film personally supervised by Disney, was released. It would become an enormous box-office and critical success.
- Born: Eric Stuart, American voice actor and musician known for his dubbing work of Brock and James in the Pokémon series for its first eight seasons; in Brooklyn

== October 19, 1967 (Thursday) ==
- The American Mariner 5 probe made a fly-by of Venus, coming within 2,480 miles (3,990 km) of the planet's surface. The data from the Soviet Union's Venera 4, which had landed the day before, and the United States probe Mariner 5, would be analyzed by a combined team of Soviet and American scientists in the year that followed.
- The 5,500 feet (1,700 m) long Tyne Tunnel underneath the River Tyne was dedicated by Queen Elizabeth II and opened to traffic. The tunnel runs more than a mile between Jarrow and Howdon in the county of Tyne and Wear in northeast England.
- Born:
  - Trouble T Roy (stage name for Troy Dixon), American hip-hop dancer with the group Heavy D & the Boyz (d. 1990); in Mount Vernon, New York
  - Amy Carter, known for living in the White House during her adolescence as the daughter of President Jimmy Carter; in Plains, Georgia

== October 20, 1967 (Friday) ==
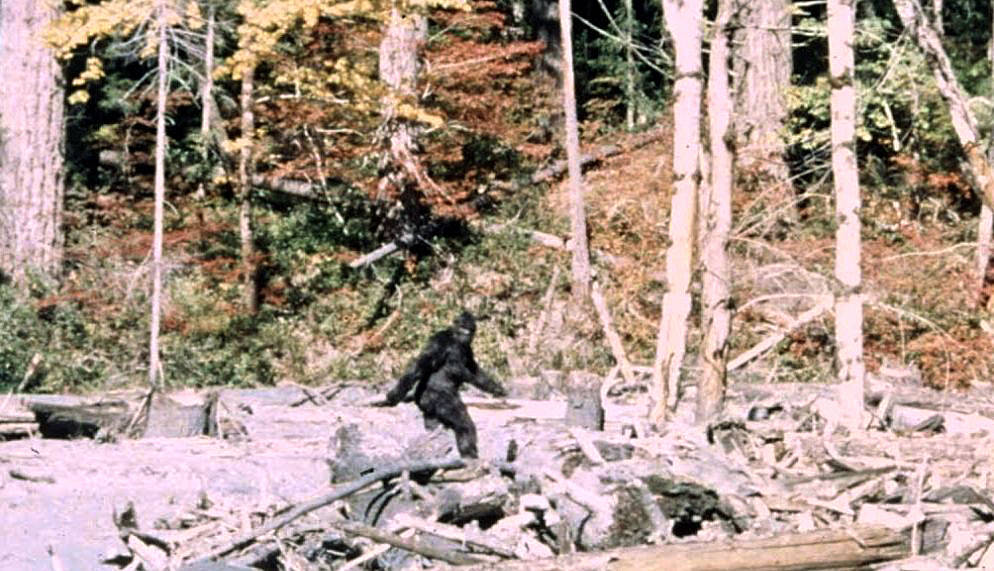
Frame 352 of the alleged "Bigfoot" film

- Roger Patterson and Robert Gimlin filmed an unidentified animal near Bluff Creek, California, which has been claimed to be "Bigfoot" or "Sasquatch". The authenticity of the film has been questioned. As one historian notes, "Experts of the time examined the film and found no flaws or evidence of fakery, but in 1999, with improved methods of analysis, suspicions of hoaxing emerged. A small object on the creature's body looks the head of a zip-fastener to what may be a monkey suit." Another author notes that "Minutiae of the creature's physiognomy, such as the exact way in which it moves its neck, and its unusual method of distributing its weight as it walked, have led many to conclude that this could not be a man in a suit."
- Guilty verdicts were returned against Neshoba County, Mississippi, Deputy Sheriff Cecil R. Price and six other defendants for violations of federal civil rights laws in connection with the 1964 murder of three civil rights workers in Philadelphia, Mississippi. Another eight defendants were acquitted, including Neshoba County Sheriff Lawrence Rainey. The trial was held before an all-white jury in the U.S. District Court in Meridian. The defendants received sentences ranging between three and ten years in prison.
- NASA requested that a joint Marshall Space Flight Center (MSFC)/Manned Spacecraft Center (MSC) document be prepared identifying each potential Orbital Workshop (OWS) crew safety hazard, the successful resolution of these hazards, and test result documentation supporting the resolutions. The effort would include the crew safety/health hazards associated with flammability, micrometeoroid penetration, outgassing, and passivation, and would consider propellant, insulation liner, crew quarters thermal curtain, and other nonmetallic material implications.
- Died: Shigeru Yoshida, 89, Prime Minister of Japan after World War II, from 1946 to 1947 and 1948 to 1954

== October 21, 1967 (Saturday) ==
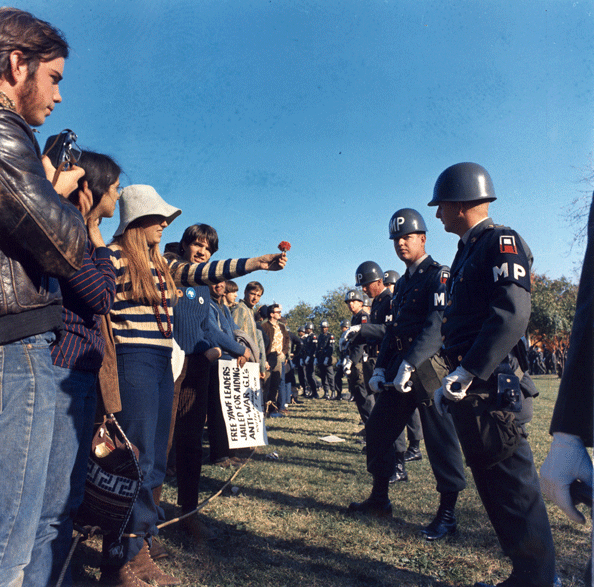
October 21, 1967: Antiwar demonstration outside the Pentagon

- In a culmination to "Stop the Draft Week", at least 30,000 people protested outside the Pentagon, headquarters of the U.S. Department of Defense. Allen Ginsberg, Abbie Hoffman, and Jerry Rubin symbolically chanted to "levitate" the building and to "exorcise the evil within." The Pentagon was defended by 2,500 U.S. Marshals and U.S. Army soldiers, and 174 protesters were arrested. The protest, organized by the National Mobilization Committee to End the War in Vietnam (colloquially known as "the Mobe"), started with a rally at the Lincoln Memorial with "perhaps 100,000 people, followed by a march to the Pentagon across the Arlington Memorial Bridge by about 35,000 people. In the view of one historian, "the protest had restrained the hawks in the administration from more vigorous pursuit of the war, because Johnson began to fear that 'domestic crisis' would mount" and at the same time "rejuvenated the peace movement and brought together almost all its factions." An editorial in The Lewiston Daily Sun asserted that the core of the protest was made up of "Professional troublemakers, many of them Communist agitators".
- Forty-seven of the 190 men on board the Israeli destroyer INS Eilat were killed after the ship was struck by three Egyptian Styx missiles and sank. At 5:30 p.m. local time the torpedo boat TP-504, directed by Commander Ahmed Shaker, fired the first missile to hit the Eilat, and TP-501, under the command of Lutfi Jadallah, made hits with two missiles that caused the ship to sink. There were 143 survivors, 91 of whom were wounded. The dead included the Eilat captain, Commander Yitzhak Shoshan. Israel would retaliate three days later by shelling Egyptian refineries along the Suez Canal.
- Died: Ejnar Hertzsprung, 94, Danish astronomer who developed the Hertzsprung–Russell diagram for stellar magnitudes, and determined the distance, in light years, of Cepheid variable stars.

== October 22, 1967 (Sunday) ==
- Voters in South Vietnam cast their ballots to fill the nation's 127-member House of Representatives. Turnout was reported at 72.9 percent, and there were almost 1,200 candidates, an average of more than nine contestants for each seat.
- Born:
  - Ulrike Maier, Austrian skier and five-time World Cup winner; in Rauris (killed in competition for the Women's World Cup, 1994)
  - Salvatore Di Vittorio, Italian classical composer and symphony conductor; in Palermo
  - Carlos Mencia, Honduran-born American comedian; in San Pedro Sula

== October 23, 1967 (Monday) ==
- A laboratory technician at the Hammermill Paper Company in Lockhaven, Pennsylvania, killed six of his co-workers and wounded five others after an argument with members of his car pool. Leo Held, who was also a member of the county school board, drove to the factory and began shooting with a .38 caliber automatic pistol, then wounded another member of the car pool who worked at the local airport. From there, he returned home, then murdered another co-worker who lived across the street from him. Police captured Held after a shootout with him in his backyard. According to survivors, Held was angry because of an argument a few weeks earlier when other members of the car pool refused to ride with him "because of his dangerous driving habits." Held would die of a pulmonary embolism two days later.
- West German millionaire Hannsheinz Porst, who had built his fortune as owner of the Photo Porst chain of photography supply shops, was arrested in Nuremberg for espionage. Since 1953, Porst, secretly a member of East Germany's Communist Party Sozialistische Einheitspartei Deutschlands, had been passing copies of confidential West German documents to the East. On July 8, 1969, Porst would be convicted of espionage and sentenced to an additional 30 months in prison.
- Charles de Gaulle became the first French Co-Prince of Andorra to visit his Andorran subjects. In addition to being President of France, de Gaulle was joint ruler (along with Spain's Bishop of Urgel) of the tiny nation located in the mountains between France and Spain, pursuant to the 1278 agreement creating the nation. De Gaulle was the eighth French head of state (and co-prince) since 1278 to have the first name "Charles".
- Died: Helen Palmer, 69, American children's book author and wife of Theodor Seuss Geisel (Dr. Seuss), died of a sodium pentobarbital overdose

== October 24, 1967 (Tuesday) ==
- U.S. Army Lt. General Lewis B. Hershey, the Director of the Selective Service System, issued the first of two memoranda that would collectively become known as the "Hershey Directive", ordering draft boards nationwide to draft anti-war protesters into the armed services. The October 24 memo directed that a young man who had burned his draft card should be reclassified as Class 1-O for being delinquent. Two days later, Hershey issued a longer memorandum directing that draft-registered protesters, or the persons who encouraged them not to enlist, be reclassified for drafting or prosecution, which would include changing student deferments. "Demonstrations, when they become illegal, have produced and will continue to produce much evidence that relates to the basis for classification", Hershey wrote, adding, "A local board, upon receipt of this information, may reopen the classification of the registrant, classify him anew, and if evidence of violation of the act and regulations is established, also to declare the registrant to be a delinquent and to process him accordingly. This should include all registrants with remaining liability up to 35 years of age." Hershey would say at a November 8 press conference that voiding student deferments for protesters was not a form of protesting dissent because, "I've never felt that going into the service of the United States is a punishment, whether voluntarily or through the draft." An injunction against enforcing the directive would be issued by a federal court, and the United States Court of Appeals would rule on June 6, 1969, that draft boards had no right to reclassify any registrants based on protest activities.
- Israel retaliated against Egypt for the sinking of the INS Eilat by destroying two major oil refineries that handled 80 percent of Egypt's capability for refining and storing petroleum. The El Nasser Refinery produced 3.5 million tons of oil a year, and the Suez Refinery 2 million, prior to the attack. The refinery at Alexandria, which provided the remaining 1.5 million tons, was not affected.
- Following several years of negotiations, Australian territories minister Charles Barnes announced to the Australian House of Representatives that the Australian-administered United Nations trust territory of Nauru would be granted "full and unqualified independence", with independence legislation to immediately follow.
- Born: Jacqueline McKenzie, Australian stage and screen actress; in Sydney

== October 25, 1967 (Wednesday) ==
- In Arcadia, Florida, all seven children of migrant farm worker James Joseph Richardson, ranging in age from two to eight years old, were fatally poisoned after eating a lunch that had been prepared for them before Richardson went to work. Richardson would spend 22 years in prison after initially being sentenced to the death penalty for the children's deaths, but would be exonerated after evidence was discovered that the children had been poisoned by their babysitter. After being released on April 25, 1989, following evidence of prosecutorial misconduct in the 1967 trial, Richardson would later be paid $1.2 million by the state of Florida for his wrongful imprisonment.
- Abdul Hamid al-Bakkoush was appointed as the new Prime Minister of Libya and would make efforts to modernize the bureaucracy and the Libyan armed forces. Al-Bakkoush, who continued to serve as Justice Minister, replaced Abdul Qadir al-Badri, who had been forced to resign after his harsh measures in breaking strikes by oil workers and student protests.
- Died:
  - Margaret Ayer Barnes, 81, American playwright and novelist, 1931 Pulitzer Prize winner
  - Stephen Sargent Visher, 79, American geographer and eugenicist

== October 26, 1967 (Thursday) ==
- The coronation ceremony of Shah Mohammad Reza Pahlavi of Iran, ruler of the nation since 1941, took place in Tehran on the Shah's 48th birthday. The Shah, who would be overthrown less than a dozen years later, had reportedly vowed that he would not allow himself to be crowned until he could restore Iran to greatness. During the ceremony, he "took his seat on the fabled Peacock Throne and placed on his head an egret-plumed crown containing 3,755 jewels." He then bestowed his 29-year old wife Farah Diba as the Shahbanu with a crown that had "1,469 diamonds and 177 rubies, emeralds and pearls".
- U.S. Navy pilot John McCain III was shot down over North Vietnam and taken prisoner. The son of Vice Admiral John S. McCain Jr., Lt. Commander McCain had taken off from USS Oriskany in an A-4 Skyhawk on his 23rd bombing mission, when his plane was struck by an anti-aircraft missile. He ejected over Hanoi, and broke both arms and his right leg in the process, and parachuting into the Truc Bach Lake in the heart of the city, upon landing. Local citizens saved him from drowning by dragging him to the shoreline, and some began to beat him before another citizen intervened. McCain, the son of a U.S. Navy admiral, would be a prisoner of war for more than five years, turning down a chance at being set free early before finally being released on March 15, 1973. He would later be elected a U.S. Senator for Arizona and be the Republican candidate for president in 2008.
- Born: Keith Urban, New Zealand-born Australian and American country music singer; in Whangārei

== October 27, 1967 (Friday) ==
- The Abortion Act 1967 was given royal assent by Queen Elizabeth II, to take effect on April 27, 1968, in order to allow the British Ministry of Health a six-month transition time "to make arrangements in state hospitals" for the new procedures. The new law would replace an 1801 act that allowed abortions only if the mother's life or her physical health were "gravely endangered". Under the new law, abortions would also be allowed if there was a risk that the child would be born with "physical or mental abnormalities as to be seriously handicapped"; if the mother's mental health might be injured; or if "any of her existing children might be injured mentally or physically". For the first time, abortions would also be available without cost under the national health care system.
- U.S. Air Force Colonel John P. Flynn was taken prisoner when his F-105 Thunderchief fighter was struck by a surface to air missile while he was flying over North Vietnam in wartime. Flynn became the highest-ranking American prisoner of war of the Vietnam War and would not be liberated from the Hỏa Lò Prison (nicknamed the "Hanoi Hilton") until his release (along with 107 other prisoners) on March 14, 1973. During his time as a POW, he would be promoted to the rank of brigadier general on May 1, 1971.
- Father Philip Berrigan, a Roman Catholic priest in the St. Peter Claver Church of Baltimore, broke into the city's selective service office and poured blood into 16 file drawers as a protest against the Vietnam War. Berrigan, who was sent to jail, was joined in the attack by Reverend James Mengel of the United Church of Christ, Thomas Lewis and David Eberhardt of the Baltimore Interfaith Peace organization.
- Born: Scott Weiland, American rock musician for Stone Temple Pilots; in San Jose, California (d. 2015)
- Died: Robert Carmody, 29, American Olympic bronze medalist in boxing, was killed in action in a Viet Cong ambush. He would be posthumously awarded the Bronze Star.

== October 28, 1967 (Saturday) ==
The 440 acres ceded from the U.S. to Mexico

- The 103-year-old Chamizal dispute between the United States and Mexico was declared at an end in a joint statement by U.S. President Lyndon Johnson and Mexican President Gustavo Díaz Ordaz at Ciudad Juárez. Effective on the proclamation, 440 acres (180 ha) or 0.6875 square miles (1.78 square km) of land was ceded from the U.S. to Mexico. On the way to the ceremony, Johnson and Díaz were cheered by at least 200,000 Mexican residents, giving Johnson "a welcome seldom seen by any American President in his own country."
- Troops of the Democratic Republic of the Congo began an offensive to retake Bukavu from Belgian mercenaries.
- Born: Julia Roberts, American film and television star, winner of the 2000 Academy Award for Best Actress and of an Emmy Award in 2014; in Smyrna, Georgia

== October 29, 1967 (Sunday) ==
- Oscar Gestido, the President of Uruguay challenged former Uruguayan Treasury Minister Amílcar Vasconcellos to a duel, two days after the former minister had made a speech criticizing the Gestido administration. President Gestido had taken offense at a statement by Vasconcellos that the nation was "governed by a lack of common sense". Uruguay was, at the time, one of the few nations in the world where fighting a duel with deadly weapons was legal, but national law required that the challengers' seconds had to appoint a court of honor to decide whether there were grounds for a duel.
- Expo 67 closed in Montreal, after having attracted more than 50,306,648 visitors in six months, a record attendance for any world's fair. Canada's Prime Minister Lester B. Pearson declared at the closing ceremonies that the exhibit had been "one of the most imaginative acts of faith in Canadian enterprise and ability ever attempted", and added, "We have discovered that we do have a character and quality of our own, rich and diverse, but Canadian." Despite the record number of visitors, the fair, which opened on April 28, ran a deficit of US$250,000,000.
- Born:
  - Péter Kun, Hungarian hard rock guitarist; in Pusztaszabolcs (killed in motorcycle accident, 1993)
  - Rufus Sewell, English stage, film and television actor; in Twickenham, London
- Died:
  - Jack McVitie, 35, London criminal known as "Jack the Hat", was murdered by Reggie Kray and Ronnie Kray, the "Kray twins". McVitie had made the mistake of accepting £500 from Ronnie to commit a murder, then bungled the attempt. After McVitie got drunk and made a show of "waving a shotgun and saying he was looking for the twins", word got back to the Krays and they hired two henchmen to bring him to an apartment. McVitie was stabbed beneath his eye with a carving knife and repeatedly in the stomach by Reggie, who then "impaled him through the throat to the floor" and disposed of the body. The murder would be the crime that put the Kray twins (and their brother Charlie, who disposed of the body) in prison.
  - Julien Duvivier, 71, French film director

== October 30, 1967 (Monday) ==
- The Constitutional Conference on Equatorial Guinea was convened in Madrid by Spanish and Guinean participants, to discuss three possibilities for the independence of Spain's few African colonies. One was for the island of Fernando Pó (now called Bioko) and the mainland colony of Río Muni to become two separate nations; the second was to allow the colony to become part of the adjacent nation of Cameroon; and the one ultimately chosen was to create a single federal republic in which the island and the mainland would be autonomous provinces.
- Police in Prague forcibly broke up a protest by university students who were angry about repeated cuts in electric power to their dormitories, located in the city's Strahov district, leading to even more meetings that was reported by the press in Czechoslovakia "with an openness unthinkable even a few months before." Czechoslovak Communist Party Secretary Antonín Novotný was unable to suppress the anti-government protests because of dissension within the party's Presidium.
- Kosmos 186 and Kosmos 188, launched by the Soviet Union, accomplished the first automated docking and separation of uncrewed spacecraft in orbit, using only transmitted commands from ground controllers. Kosmos 186 had been put into orbit three days earlier, and Kosmos 188 docked with it after its launch.
- Hans Bethe, a German-born physicist at Cornell University who had helped develop the hydrogen bomb and protections against radiation hazards, was awarded the Nobel Prize in Physics, while Manfred Eigen, Ronald W. Norrish and George Porter were awarded the Nobel Prize in Chemistry.
- Born:
  - Ty Detmer, American college and professional football player, 1990 Heisman Trophy winner; in San Marcos, Texas
  - Gavin Rossdale, English rock musician, frontman of Bush, in Marylebone

== October 31, 1967 (Tuesday) ==
- Queen Elizabeth II conducted the State Opening of Parliament and informed the members of the House of Lords that their hereditary succession and many of their governmental powers would be eliminated. Reading from a speech written by Prime Minister Harold Wilson, the Queen said "Legislation will be introduced to reduce the powers of the House of Lords and to eliminate its present hereditary basis, thereby enabling it to develop within the framework of a modern parliamentary system." Wilson's Labour Party would find strong opposition by the Conservative Party to the reform of the House of Lords, and would proceed no further with the legislation after 18 months. Major reforms would not come until 1999.
- Nguyen Van Thieu was sworn into office as the 4th President of South Vietnam. In his inaugural address, President Thiệu said, "I will make a direct proposal to the North Vietnamese government to sit down at the conference table" to seek a way of ending the Vietnam War.
- Born:
  - Buddy Lazier, American auto racing driver and winner of the 1996 Indianapolis 500; in Vail, Colorado
  - Vanilla Ice (stage name for Robert Van Winkle), American rap artist; in Dallas, Texas
