= Hibernia (disambiguation) =

Hibernia is the Classical Latin name for the island of Ireland.

Hibernia may also refer to:

== Locations ==
=== Australia ===
- Hibernia, Queensland, a locality in the Central Highlands, Queensland

=== Canada ===
- Hibernia, Nova Scotia, a community in the Region of Queens Municipality
- Hibernia oil field, a major offshore oil project on the Grand Banks of Newfoundland, Canada
  - Hibernia Gravity Base Structure, an oil platform operating on the field

=== United States ===
- Hibernia, Florida, a town
- Hibernia, Clark County, Indiana, an unincorporated place
- Hibernia, New Jersey, an unincorporated place
- Hibernia mines, iron mines in northern New Jersey
- Hibernia, Ohio, a former village outside modern-day Reynoldsburg

== Companies ==
- Hibernia Brewing, a defunct brewery in Eau Claire, Wisconsin
- Hibernia Networks, a defunct telecom infrastructure provider, acquired by GTT Communications in 2017
- Hibernia National Bank, a defunct bank formerly operating in Louisiana and Texas, acquired by Capital One in 2005
  - Hibernia Bank Building (New Orleans), former headquarters of Hibernia National Bank
- Hibernia Bank (San Francisco), a defunct bank based in San Francisco, merged into Security Pacific in 1988
  - Hibernia Bank Building (San Francisco), former headquarters of The Hibernia Bank, now The Hibernia meeting and event space
- Hibernia College, an online college based in Ireland
- Hibernia REIT, a real estate investment trust based in Dublin

== Transportation ==
- Hibernia (locomotive), the name given to one of the first two railway locomotives to run in Ireland
- Hibernia 41-E, steam locomotives run in Germany
- Hibernia (ship), several merchant vessels
- HMS Hibernia, ships of the British Royal Navy

== Other uses ==
- Hibernia (personification), used occasionally as a national personification of Ireland
- Hibernia Atlantic, a transatlantic submarine communications cable connecting Canada and the United States with Ireland and the United Kingdom
- Hibernia, defunct Irish political magazine that was a predecessor publication of The Phoenix
- Hibernia, misspelling of Hybernia, a junior synonym of the geometer moth genus Erannis
- Hibernia (album), a 2016 album by Irish violinist Máiréad Nesbitt

== See also ==
- Hibernian (disambiguation)
- Hiberna, an obligation to accommodate troops during winter in the Polish–Lithuanian Commonwealth
- Hibernophile, someone very interested in Irish culture
