= Hibernia (ship) =

List of ships with the same or similar names

Hibernia was the name of a number of merchant ships.

- Hibernia (1752), the ship thought to have transported the Liberty Bell from England to the U.S. in 1752.
- Hibernia, of 75 tons (bm), launched at Chester in 1768. Broken up in 1793.
- Hibernia (1810 ship), a merchant vessel launched in 1810 that repelled a more heavily armed American privateer in 1814 in a notable single-ship action
- Hibernia (1828 ship), ship launched in 1828 at Prince Edward's Island that sank in 1833 in the South Atlantic
- PS Hibernia (1847), in service with the London and North Western Railway until 1884
- SS Hibernia (1861), an Atlantic Royal Mail Steamship Navigation Company cable laying ship which sank in 1877.
- SS Hibernia (1865), a passenger ship built by Stephen & Sons, in service with Anchor Line, sank on 25 November 1868.
- TSS Hibernia (1899), in service with the London and North Western Railway until 1915.
- SB Hibernia, a Thames sailing barge built in 1906
- TSS Hibernia (1920), in service with the London and North Western Railway, London, Midland and Scottish Railway and British Railways until 1949
- MV Hibernia
- SS Hibernia (1949), in service with British Railways from 1949 to 1976
- MS Stena Hibernia, an Irish Sea ferry in the 1990s

== See also ==
- Hibernia (disambiguation)
- HMS Hibernia, ships of the British Royal Navy
