= Hibernian =

Hibernian may refer to:

- Of Hibernia, Latin name for Ireland; hence
  - Irish (disambiguation)

Hibernian, Hibernians or The Hibernian may refer to:

== Sports clubs ==
- Hibernian F.C., a Scottish football club, founded 1875
- Hibernian W.F.C., a Scottish women's football club, founded 1999, affiliated with Hibernian F.C.
- Hibernians F.C., a Maltese football club, founded 1922
- Cambuslang Hibernian F.C., a Scottish football club, active 1884–1908
- Cork Hibernians F.C., an Irish soccer club, active 1957–1977
- Dundee Hibernian F.C., a Scottish football club, founded 1909 (renamed Dundee United in 1923)
- Duntocher Hibernian F.C., a Scottish football club, active 1894–1980
- Galway Hibernians A.F.C., an Irish soccer club, founded 1942
- Maryhill Hibernians F.C., a Scottish football club, active 1923–1967 (renamed Maryhill Harp in 1939)
- Navan Hibernians GAC, an Irish hurling club active in 1902
- Philadelphia Hibernian, an American soccer club, active 1909–1921
- Seattle Hibernian, an American soccer club, successively named Seattle FC (1995), Seattle Hibernian (1996-2004), Hibernian & Caledonian (2005), and Hibernian Saints (2006).

== Finance ==
- Hibernian Bank Ltd, absorbed by the Bank of Ireland in 1958
- Hibernian Aviva, an Irish insurance company
- Hibernian Catholic Benefit Society, a New Zealand friendly society and formerly, an associated credit union
- Los Angeles Hibernian Bank, American bank sold in 1988 to Security Pacific

== Other uses ==
- Ancient Order of Hibernians, an Irish Catholic fraternal organisation based in the United States
- Hibernian (album), a 1995 release by Irish band Tír na nÓg
- Hibernian Orchestra, orchestra founded in Dublin in 1981
- Hibernian Magazine (disambiguation)
- Hibernian Rifles, a marginal Irish nationalist militia that organised in Ireland in the early years of the 20th Century

== See also ==
- Hibernia (disambiguation)
- Hibernian Hall (disambiguation)
- Hibs
