= TSS Princess Maud =

Ferry boat

History
- Name: 1934–1966 TSS Princess Maud; 1966–1969 Venus; 1969–1973 NYBO
- Owner: 1934–1947: London Midland and Scottish Railway; 1948–1962: British Transport Commission; 1962–1965: British Rail; 1965-1969: Lefkosia Compania Naviera, Panama; 1969-1973:
- Operator: 1928–1947: London Midland and Scottish Railway; 1948–1962: British Transport Commission; 1962–1965: British Rail; 1966–1969: Cyprus Sea Cruises; 1969–1973:
- Route: 1934–1939 Stranraer – Larne; 1940-1940 English Channel; 1940-1943 Stranraer – Larne; 1944-1945 English Channel; 1946–1965 Irish Sea relief ship; 1951-1951 Southampton – Saint-Malo - Guernsey; 1966-1969 Adriatic Sea - North East Mediterranean
- Builder: William Denny and Brothers, Dumbarton
- Yard number: 1265
- Launched: 19 December 1933
- Completed: February 1934
- Fate: Scrapped Bilbao, Spain 1973

General characteristics
- Type: Turbine steam ship
- Tonnage: 2,886 GRT; 2,917 GRT
- Length: 330 ft (100 m)
- Beam: 49.1 ft (15.0 m)
- Depth: 25 ft (7.6 m)
- Propulsion: Four steam turbines SR geared to two screw shafts. 1375 nhp
- Speed: 21 knots (39 km/h)
- Capacity: 1,458; 223(berths)

TSS Princess Maud was a ferry that operated from 1934 usually in the Irish Sea apart from a period as a troop ship in the Second World War and before being sold outside the United Kingdom in 1965. She was built by William Denny and Brothers of Dumbarton on the Firth of Clyde for the London Midland and Scottish Railway (LMS). When the LMS was nationalised in 1948 she passed to the British Transport Commission and onward to British Rail in 1962. She was sold to Lefkosia Compania Naviera, Panama in 1965. Renamed Venus she was for service in Greek waters. It is understood she saw use as an accommodation ship in Burmeister & Wain, Copenhagen.

== Construction ==
As well as having mechanical stokers and all deck machinery mechanically driven she was the first British ship to have a fire protection automatic sprinkler system. As built she had places for 80 cattle and was on occasion referred to as a cattle boat.

== Service ==
=== Pre-war service ===
The LMS ordered Princess Maud and she was completed by William Denny and Brothers of Dumbarton in 1934. She was a development from the slightly smaller Princess Margaret from the same builders, in 1931. Both ships worked the Stranraer - Larne crossing in the 1930s.

=== Second World War service ===
In the Second World War, Princess Maud served as a troopship and initially operated the Dover—Boulogne route to France from January 1940.

Princess Maud assisted in Dunkirk evacuation but was shelled in the engine room, taking fatalities on 30 May 1940. On 4 June 1940, following repairs, she was able to return to the evacuation, rescuing 1270 in a single trip, being the penultimate ship away from Dunkirk. She subsequently assisted the evacuation of British and French troops from Veules-les-Roses around 12 June 1940, at the time of the surrender of the 51st Highland Division at Saint-Valery-en-Caux, a few miles to the west, transporting 600 British and French troops of the 2,280 rescued.

She then reverted to serving on the Stranraer-Larne route on behalf of the Admiralty until, in 1943, when she received modifications for the planned invasion of France to turn her into a Landing Ship, Infantry, LSI(H), capable of launching six Landing Craft Assault (LCA) boats via hand hoists.

For the D-Day landings, she was attached to the US Task Force O of Operation Neptune covering Omaha Beach.

For the remainder of 1944 and into 1945, she worked various cross-Channel routes well past the end of the war in Europe.

=== Post-war Service ===
Following a refurbishment after the second world war including a conversion to oil burning she resumed on the Stranraer – Larne route on 1 August 1946. The following year saw her reallocated to the Holyhead — Dún Laoghaire route when the TSS Hibernia and TSS Cambria were laid up due to coal shortages. With the coming of the MV Cambria and MV Hibernia to the route in 1949 she became the relief ship also covering other routes on the Irish Sea. She had a brief return to the English channel on Southampton Guernsey St Malo for a couple of months in 1951 before returning to Anglesey. By 1963 a British Transport Commission indicated Princess Maud was becoming increasing costly to maintain and passengers were known to avoid travelling on her, she was therefore marked for disposal with an estimated credit of £32,000.

=== Mediterranean ===
In 1966 she was sold to Lefkosia Compania Naviera, Panama and underwent a refit emerging painted white with a new name Venus with widened doors for loading cars. She was operated by Cyprus Sea Cruises of Limassol serving in Mediterranean waters until 1969. Her route included the ports of Brindisi, Ancona, Piraeus, Limassol and Haifa.

=== Accommodation Ship ===
Her final service was as a static accommodation ship known as the Nybo in the Burmeister & Wain shipyard, Copenhagen from 1969.

== Fate ==
In 1973 she was taken to Bilbao, Spain and scrapped. The Holyhead Maritime Museum holds a plate commemorating the ship's wartime service.

== Miscellaneous ==
An earlier ship of the same name, the SS Princess Maud (1902), operated ferry routes in Scotland. It was torpedoed and sunk on 10 June 1918 by a U-Boat. The Southend Motor Navigation Company Company operated four craft named Princess Maud overlapping the lifespan of the TSS Princess Maud, one was lost at Dunkirk in 1940.

== See also ==
- Diary account pilot of landing craft from Princess Maud on D-Day
