= List of shipwrecks in November 1877 =

The list of shipwrecks in November 1877 includes ships sunk, foundered, grounded, or otherwise lost during November 1877.

== 1 November ==
List of shipwrecks: 1 November 1877
Ship	State	Description
Amalie	Sweden	The barque ran aground on the Dragor Sand, in the Baltic Sea and was wrecked. She was on a voyage from Sundsvall to Marseille, Bouches-du-Rhône, France.
Consolation	United Kingdom	The steamship ran aground at Suez, Khedivate of Egypt. She was on a voyage from Amoy, China to New York, United States. She was refloated on 9 November.
Frische Trouw	Netherlands	The koff was driven ashore on Hirsholmene, Denmark. She was on a voyage from Riga, Russia to Schiedam, South Holland. She was refloated with assistance and taken in to Fredrikshavn, Denmark.
Fritz	Sweden	The brig was driven ashore on Gotska Sandön.
Hilda	Sweden	The schooner capsized at South Shields, County Durham, United Kingdom.
Rapid	United Kingdom	The brig struck a rock off Læsø, Denmark and sank. Her crew were rescued. She was on a voyage from Granton, Lothian to Riga.
St. Paul	United Kingdom	The steamship was wrecked at "Bonden", Sweden. Her crew were rescued. She was on a voyage from South Shields to Stockholm, Sweden.
Wave	United Kingdom	The ship was driven ashore on Norderney, Germany with the loss of two of her four crew. Survivors were rescued by the Norderney Lifeboat. She was on a voyage from Harburg, Germany to "Schan".

== 2 November ==
List of shipwrecks: 2 November 1877
Ship	State	Description
Alice Cookall	United Kingdom	The ship was driven ashore at Newhaven, Sussex. She was on a voyage from Middlesbrough, Yorkshire to Port Talbot, Glamorgan. She was refloated the next day with the assistance of a tug and towed in to Newhaven. She was placed under repair.
Ann	United Kingdom	The brig ran aground on the Cross Sand, in the North Sea off the coast of Norfolk. She was on a voyage from Blyth, Northumberland to Lisbon, Portugal. She was refloated and taken in to Great Yarmouth, Norfolk.
Anna	Sweden	The ship was abandoned at sea. Her crew were rescued. She was on a voyage from Kronstadt, Russia to Karlshamn.
Avance	Norway	The ship ran aground on the Falsterbo Reef, in the Baltic Sea. Her crew were rescued by a Swedish steamship, but her captain refused to abandon ship. Avance was on a voyage from Skutskär, Sweden to Gravelines, Nord, France. She was refloated and found to be waterlogged.
Bertha	Norway	The barque ran aground on the Goodwin Sands, Kent, United Kingdom. She was on a voyage from Dram to Poole, Dorset, United Kingdom. She was refloated and taken in to Ramsgate, Kent.
Deodata	Norway	The barque was driven ashore on Terschelling, Friesland, Netherlands. Her crew were rescued. She was on a voyage from Vyborg, Grand Duchy of Finland to Amsterdam, North Holland, Netherlands.
Favourite	United Kingdom	The ketch caught fire east of the Dogger Bank and was abandoned. Her crew were rescued by the brig Cactus (United Kingdom).
Immanuel	Germany	The ship sank off Gotland, Sweden. Her crew were rescued.
Jacobine	Denmark	The schooner was driven ashore and wrecked at Thisted. Her crew were rescued. She was on a voyage from Norrköping to Stockholm, Sweden.
Julie Caroline	United Kingdom	The ship was wrecked in the Raz de Sein. She was on a voyage from Nantes, Loire-Inférieure, France to King's Lynn, Norfolk.
Lady of the Lake	United Kingdom	The ship was wrecked at Cape Arkona, Germany. Her crew were rescued. She was on a voyage from Stettin, Germany to Peterhead, Aberdeenshire.
Lübeck	Germany	The steamship was driven ashore at Visby, Sweden. She was on a voyage from Lübeck to Saint Petersburg, Russia. She was refloated on 5 November.
Pearl	United Kingdom	The ship departed from Tilt Cove, Newfoundland Colony for Swansea, Glamorgan. No further trace, reported missing.

== 3 November ==
List of shipwrecks: 3 November 1877
Ship	State	Description
Augustine Kobbe	Flag unknown	The ship collided with the steamship Corcyra (United Kingdom) in the River Mersey. She was taken in to Liverpool, Lancashire, United Kingdom in a waterlogged condition.
Dora	Sweden	The brig put in to Gothenburg in a waterlogged condition. She was on a voyage from Pori, Finland to Grimsby, Lincolnshire, United Kingdom.
Harewood	United Kingdom	The ship was found abandoned in the Atlantic Ocean (45°44′N 35°55′W) by the steamship Abyssinia (United Kingdom).
Rotterdam	United Kingdom	The steamship ran aground at the mouth of the River Carron. She was refloated the next day.
Sandringham	United States	The steamship was severely damaged by fire in port. She was on a voyage from Havana, Cuba to New Orleans, Louisiana.
Two unnamed vessels	Flags unknown	The ships ran aground in the River Thames at Limehouse, Middlesex, United Kingdom and each collided with the tug that was towing her.

== 4 November ==
List of shipwrecks: 4 November 1877
Ship	State	Description
Bee	United Kingdom	The schooner was driven ashore at Dungeness, Kent. She was on a voyage from Goole, Yorkshire to Brading, Isle of Wight. She was refloated and resumed her voyage.
John Wesley	United Kingdom	The schooner ran aground on the Black Rock Ledge, off the Isle of Wight. She was on a voyage from Antwerp, Belgium to Newport, Monmouthshire. She was refloated.
Olive Branch	United Kingdom	The smack ran aground on Scroby Sands, Norfolk. She floated off and sank. Her crew survived.
Phœnix	Norway	The steamship was wrecked at Vestervig, Denmark with the loss of three of her crew. She was on a voyage from Newcastle upon Tyne, Northumberland, United Kingdom to Riga, Russia.
Queen of England	United Kingdom	The lugger was driven ashore at Great Yarmouth, Norfolk. She was refloated with assistance from the tug Comet (United Kingdom) and taken in to Yarmouth.
Rallus	United Kingdom	The steamship was driven ashore at Baarland, Zeeland, Netherlands. She was on a voyage from Antwerp to Liverpool, Lancashire. She was refloated with assistance from a number of tugs.

== 5 November ==
List of shipwrecks: 5 November 1877
Ship	State	Description
Albion	Netherlands	The galiot foundered in the North Sea. Her crew were rescued. She was on a voyage from Stockholm, Sweden to London, United Kingdom.
Anna	Germany	The schooner was driven ashore at Faro, Portugal and was severely damaged.
Annie Richmond	United Kingdom	The barque caught fire and was abandoned in the Atlantic Ocean. Her crew were rescued. She was on a voyage from Liverpool, Lancashire to Valparaíso, Chile.
Heroine	United Kingdom	The ship ran aground in the channel at Wells-next-the-Sea, Norfolk. She was on a voyage from Wells-next-the-Sea to Middlesbrough, Yorkshire.
Itala	Sweden	The schooner was driven ashore north of Visby. She was on a voyage from Skellefteå to Antwerp, Belgium.
Newport	United Kingdom	The Mersey Flat struck the Prince's Landing Stage, in the River Mersey and was damaged. She was beached at Tranmere, Cheshire.
River Leven	United Kingdom	The ship ran aground in the Gare Loch.
Thor	Flag unknown	The ship was driven ashore and wrecked near the "Tylo Lighthouse".
Vivid	United Kingdom	The ship was sighted off Margate, Kent whilst on a voyage from Hartlepool, County Durham to Weymouth, Dorset. No further trace, reported missing.

== 6 November ==
List of shipwrecks: 6 November 1877
Ship	State	Description
Bradford	Royal National Lifeboat Institution	The lifeboat collided with the tug Vulcan (United Kingdom) at Margate, Kent and was severely damaged. She was declared a total loss.
James Harris	United Kingdom	The steamship ran aground on the Skarlakan Reef, in the Baltic Sea off the coast of Gotland, Sweden. She was refloated and taken in to Westergarn, Sweden.
Viola	United Kingdom	The full-rigged ship was driven ashore at "Melgrane". She was on a voyage from Kronstadt, Russian Empire to King's Lynn, Norfolk. She was refloated and taken in to Rønne, Denmark.

== 7 November ==
List of shipwrecks: 7 November 1877
Ship	State	Description
Deborah S. Soule	United States	The brig was abandoned in the Atlantic Ocean (47°02′N 34°47′W). All ten people on board were rescued by Holland (United Kingdom). Deborah S. Soule was on a voyage from New York to Queenstown, County Cork, United Kingdom.
Podgorice	Ottoman Navy	Russo-Turkish war: The river monitor was shelled and sunk by Romanian coastal artillery.
Lilly	United Kingdom	The ship ran aground at Blyth, Northumberland. She was on a voyage from Gävle, Sweden to Sunderland, County Durham. She was refloated and towed in to Sunderland in a leaky condition.
Pet	United Kingdom	The fishing boat was wrecked on the Newcombe Sands, in the North Sea off the coast of Suffolk. Her ten crew were rescued by the Lowestoft Lifeboat Samuel Plimsoll ( Royal National Lifeboat Institution).

== 8 November ==
List of shipwrecks: 8 November 1877
Ship	State	Description
Commerce	United Kingdom	The schooner sprang a leak and was abandoned off Black Head, Cornwall. She was on a voyage from Fowey, Cornwall to Glasgow, Renfrewshire.
Constitution	United States	The barque was driven ashore in Little Sturgeon Bay. She was a total loss.
Empire State	United States	Empire State in 2019. The wooden brigantine was on a voyage from Marquette, Michigan, to Cleveland, Ohio, with a cargo of iron ore when she was wrecked on North Point Reef off the coast of Michigan in Lake Huron. Her wreck lies in 12 feet (3.7 m) of water at 45.014217°N 83.256283°W.
Haswell	United Kingdom	The paddle tug foundered in the Bristol Channel off Oxwich, Glamorgan. Her eight crew were rescued by the pilot cutter Benson (United Kingdom).
Meerschaum	Flag unknown	The steamship was wrecked south of Ventava, Courland Governorate with the loss of a crew member.
Pontiac	United Kingdom	The ship was driven ashore at Rio de Janeiro, Brazil. She was on a voyage from Cardiff, Glamorgan to Rio de Janeiro. She was refloated and found to be leaky.
Rose	United Kingdom	The brig was sighted in a sinking condition in the North Sea by a smack, which was unable to render assistance.
Sperimento	Italy	The barque ran aground on the Cross Sand, in the North Sea off the coast of Norfolk, United Kingdom. She was on a voyage from London to the River Tyne. She was refloated with the assistance of a tug and taken in to Great Yarmouth, Norfolk.

== 9 November ==
List of shipwrecks: 9 November 1877
Ship	State	Description
Advent	United Kingdom	The Thames barge was abandoned in the English Channel off Dungeness, Kent. Her three crew were rescued by the schooner Sarah Amy (United Kingdom). Advent was on a voyage from London to Southampton, Hampshire.
Alma	United Kingdom	The sloop collided with the Tay Bridge and sank in the Firth of Forth. She was on a voyage from Newburgh, Fife to Dundee, Forfarshire.
Concord	United Kingdom	The schooner was driven ashore at Boulmer, Northumberland.
Eagle	United Kingdom	The fishing smack was driven ashore and wrecked at Laytown, County Meath. Her crew were rescued.
Haswell	United Kingdom	The tug foundered off Oxwich Point, Glamorgan. Her crew were rescued by the pilot boat Benson (United Kingdom). Haswell was on a voyage from Swansea, Glamorgan to Sunderland, County Durham.
Helena	Norway	The schooner was driven ashore at Össby, Öland, Sweden.
Leonidas	United Kingdom	The schooner collided with Cormorin and sank in the North Sea off Cromer, Norfolk. Her crew were rescued by Comorin. Leonidas was on a voyage from West Hartlepool, County Durham to Faversham, Kent.
Liverpool	United Kingdom	The ship was driven ashore and wrecked at Bic, Quebec. She was on a voyage from Quebec City to Belfast, County Antrim. She was refloated in February 1878.
Tom Morton	United Kingdom	The steamship ran aground on the Leman and Ower Sand, in the North Sea. She was on a voyage from Leith, Lothian to London. She was refloated the next day with the assistance of a number of smacks and resumed her voyage.
Toivo	(Russian Empire) Grand Duchy of Finland	The ship ran aground on the Svenska Högarna, Sweden. She was on a voyage from Saint Petersburg, Russia to Oulu. She was refloated and towed in to Stockholm, Sweden in a waterlogged condition.

== 10 November ==
List of shipwrecks: 10 November 1877
Ship	State	Description
Aalborg	Denmark	The barque was driven ashore at Svaneke, Bornholm. She was on a voyage from "Upernavik" to Hull, Yorkshire, United Kingdom. She subsequently became a wreck.
Elba	Denmark	The barque was wrecked at Saint Thomas, Virgin Islands. Her crew were rescued.
Grevinde Trijs	Denmark	The ship was sighted off Helsingør whilst on a voyage from Kronstadt, Russia to Gloucester, United Kingdom. No further trace, reported missing.
Jean Marie	Netherlands	The schooner ran aground on the Domesnes Reef. Her crew were rescued.
Indus	United Kingdom	The smack was run into by a Dutch fishing smack and sank in the North Sea. Two of her eight crew were rescued by the smack and the rest by the brigantine Progress ( (United Kingdom of Great Britain and Ireland) Guernsey).
Queen of the South	United Kingdom	The ship was wrecked at "Recherchedy", Tasmania. She was on a voyage from Mauritius to Dunedin, New Zealand.
Pekin	United Kingdom	The ship was sighted in distress in the Atlantic Ocean by City of Montreal (United Kingdom), which lost a crew member in an unsuccessful attempt to rescue her crew. Pekin was on a voyage from New York, United States to Cardiff, Glamorgan. No further trace, reported missing.
Roselle	Sweden	The ship was wrecked at "Lange Orge". Her crew were rescued. She was on a voyage from Gävle to Skutskär.
Waihopai	New Zealand	The 44-ton schooner was wrecked near the mouth of Wellington Harbour while arriving from the Marlborough Sounds during a gale. All hands were saved, but the ship and cargo were lost.
380	Russia	The lighter was run into by the steamship Gibraltar (Sweden) and sank at Kronstadt.
Unnamed	Flag unknown	The ship ran aground on the Domesnes Reef.

== 11 November ==
List of shipwrecks: 11 November 1877
Ship	State	Description
Aalborg	Denmark	The barque was driven ashore on Bornholm.
Abraham Thomas	France	The schooner was driven ashore at Great Yarmouth, Norfolk, United Kingdom.
Advent	United Kingdom	The abandoned sloop was towed in to Antwerp, Belgium by a steamship and a fishing smack. She was on a voyage from Southampton, Hampshire to Ipswich, Suffolk.
Agnes and Helen	United Kingdom	The schooner was driven ashore at Great Yarmouth. Her crew were rescued by the Great Yarmouth Lifeboat. She was on a voyage from Newcastle upon Tyne, Northumberland to London. She was refloated the next day and towed in to Great Yarmouth.
Alfred and Emma	United Kingdom	The ship struck rocks at Thurso, Caithness and was abandoned by her captain. She floated off and drifted out to sea with the rest of her crew on board. She was driven ashore and wrecked at Deerness, Orkney Islands the next day. Nineteen crew were rescued by the Thurso Lifeboat Charley Lloyd ( Royal National Lifeboat Institution). Alfred and Emma was on a voyage from Scrabster, Caithness to Fleetwood, Lancashire.
Allerton Packet	United Kingdom	The schooner was driven ashore at Great Yarmouth. Her five crew were rescued by the Coastguard using rocket apparatus and by the Great Yarmouth Lifeboat. She was on a voyage from Hartlepool, County Durham to a Devon port, or to Dover, Kent.
Barrowgill Castle	United Kingdom	The schooner was wrecked at Thurso, Caithness. Her crew were rescued by the Thurso Lifeboat.
Beatrice	United Kingdom	The brig was driven ashore at Great Yarmouth. Her crew were rescued by the Great Yarmouth Lifeboat. She was on a voyage from Hartlepool to London or Dover.
Daisy	United Kingdom	The brigantine was wrecked at "Cornelmawr", in Carmarthen Bay with the loss of four of her twelve crew. She was on a voyage from the Cameroon River, to Bristol, Gloucestershire.
D'Artagnan	France	The brig was wrecked in Pegwell Bay. Her five crew were rescued by the North Deal Lifeboat.
Elizabeth	United Kingdom	The schooner was driven ashore at "Linsport", County Londonderry. Her crew were rescued. She was on a voyage from Londonderry to Ramelton, County Donegal.
Emilia Anne	United Kingdom	The brigantine was abandoned in the Atlantic Ocean. Her seven crew were rescued by the barque Morning Star (United Kingdom). Emilia Anne was on a voyage from the Newfoundland Colony to Sydney, Nova Scotia, Canada.
Gilsland	United Kingdom	The barque was driven ashore and wrecked at Stornoway, Isle of Lewis, Outer Hebrides. Her crew were rescued. She was on a voyage from Kronstadt, Russia to Larne, County Antrim. She was refloated on 26 February 1878 and taken in to Stornoway. Subsequently repaired and returned to service as Lewis Castle.
Guiding Star	United Kingdom	The schooner was wrecked. Her crew were rescued by the Thurso Lifeboat Charley Lloyd ( Royal National Lifeboat Institution).
Hedvig Sophia	Sweden	The barque was wrecked in Pegwell Bay. Her twelve crew were rescued by the North Deal Lifeboat.
Jane and Ellen	United Kingdom	The schooner was wrecked. Her three crew were rescued by the Abersoch Lifeboat Mabel Louisa ( Royal National Lifeboat Institution).
John Douse	United Kingdom	The brigantine was driven ashore at Sandown, Isle of Wight. Her eight crew were rescued; six of them by the Coastguard using rocket apparatus and two by the Bembridge Lifeboat. She was on a voyage from Rouen, Seine-Inférieure, France to Cork. She broke up the next day.
Kate	(United Kingdom of Great Britain and Ireland) Isle of Man	The schooner was driven ashore at Thurso. Her crew were rescued by rocket apparatus.
Laine	(Russian Empire) Grand Duchy of Finland	The barque was driven ashore on Læsø, Denmark. She was on a voyage from Grimsby, Lincolnshire, United Kingdom to Stockholm, Sweden. Laine subsequently floated off and drifted out to sea. Her crew were rescued. She was later towed in to Kladesholmen, Sweden
Marie et Louise	France	The schooner was driven ashore at Gorleston, Suffolk. Her crew survived. She was on a voyage from Newcastle upon Tyne to Gravelines, Nord.
Mystic Tie	United Kingdom	The ship was lost off St Davids Head, Pembrokeshire with the loss of four of her eleven crew. Survivors were rescued by the St. David's Lifeboat Augusta ( Royal National Lifeboat Institution). Mystic Tie was on a voyage from Bonny, Africa to Havre de Grâce, Seine-Inférieure, France.
Nicholas	United Kingdom	The ship foundered off the east Kent coast.
Sophie	United Kingdom	The schooner was driven ashore at Lemvig, Denmark. Her crew were rescued. She was on a voyage from "Skouvik" to Amsterdam, North Holland, Netherlands.
Star of Albion	United Kingdom	The ship foundered off the east Kent coast.
Thule	Norway	The steamship was driven ashore at "Gothen", Sweden. She was on a voyage from Reval, Russia to Christiania. She was refloated and taken in to Slite, Sweden.
North Deal Lifeboat	United Kingdom	The lifeboat was severely damaged whilst rescuing the crews of D'Artagnan (France) and Hedvig Sophia (Sweden).
Two unnamed vessels	Flags unknown	The brigs ran aground on the Caister Shoal, in the North Sea off the coast of Norfolk. They were refloated the next day with assistance from the tugs Black Prince and Fiery Cross (both United Kingdom).

== 12 November ==
List of shipwrecks: 12 November 1877
Ship	State	Description
Angier	United States	The ship was driven ashore and wrecked on Walney Island, Lancashire, United Kingdom. She was on a voyage from Wiscasset, Maine, United States to Barrow-in-Furness, Lancashire.
Artushof	GermanyUnited Kingdom	The steamship was run into by the steamship Horrox at Antwerp, Belgium. Sinking at the stern, she was beached. Artushof was on a voyage from Antwerp to Riga, Russia. She was refloated on 21 November.
Augusta	United Kingdom	The steamship ran aground on The Shingles, off the Kent coast. Nine of her crew were lost. She was on a voyage from London to Ghent, East Flanders, Belgium. She was refloated and towed in to Gravesend, Kent.
Collingwood	United Kingdom	The ship was abandoned in the Atlantic Ocean. All on board were rescued by the steamship Glamis Castle (United Kingdom). Collingwood was on a voytage from Betts Cove, Newfoundland Colony to Belfast, County Antrim.
Edmond	France	The brig was driven ashore and wrecked at Copt Point, near Folkestone, Kent with the loss of three of her crew. She was on a voyage from Sunderland, County Durham to Calais.
Elms	United Kingdom	The steamship ran aground on the Pye Sand, in the North Sea off the coast of Essex. She was on a voyage from Goole, Yorkshire to London. She was refloated and resumed her voyage.
Froken	Sweden	The schooner was wrecked on the Kentish Knock. Her crew were rescued by the steamship Collingwood (United Kingdom). Froken was on a voyage from Danzig, Germany to Honfleur, Manche, France.
Georges et Valentine	France	The schooner was driven ashore and severely damaged in Pegwell Bay. Her five crew were rescued by the Ramsgate Lifeboat. Georges et Valentine was on a voyage from Dunkirk, Nord to Cherbourg, Manche. She was later refloated and towed in to Ramsgate.
Grangemouth	United Kingdom	The steamship ran aground at Rotterdam, South Holland, Netherlands. She was on a voyage from Torrerdam to Grangemouth, Stirlingshire. She was refloated with the assistance of three tugs and resumed her voyage.
Indefatigable	Norway	The barque collided with the barque Ingeborg (Russia) and was abandoned off Öland, Sweden. Her crew were rescued by Ingeborg. Indefatigable was on a voyage from Pori, Grand Duchy of Finland to Antwerp, Belgium. She came ashore on Öland.
Julia	United Kingdom	The ship was driven ashore at "Ungskar", Sweden. She was on a voyage from Karlskrona, Sweden to Shoreham-by-Sea, Sussex.
Lord Baltimore	Norway	The barque ran aground at Falsterbo, Sweden. She was on a voyage from Sundsvall, Sweden to Cette, Hérault, France. She was refloated with assistance and taken in to Copenhagen, Denmark in a leaky condition.
Louise	United Kingdom	The fishing boat foundered off the north coast of Cornwall with the loss of all four crew.
Louise	United Kingdom	The brig was driven ashore near Ramsgate, Kent. She was on a voyage from Sundsvall, Sweden to Cherbourg, Manche.
May Queen	United Kingdom	The sailing barge was driven ashore at Orford Haven, Suffolk. Her crew were rescued. She was refloated on 17 November and beached at Orford, Suffolk. Subsequently towed to Harwich, Essex and beached.
Noach I	Netherlands	The barque was driven ashore in Pegwell Bay. Her 45 passengers and crew were taken off by the lugger Princess Royal (United Kingdom). Noach I was on a voyage from Rotterdam, South Holland to Batavia, Netherlands East Indies. She was refloated the next day with assistance from Princess Royal and the tug Aid (United Kingdom) and towed in to Ramsgate.
Nonpareil	United Kingdom	The lugger collided with another vessel and sank off Great Yarmouth with the loss of two of her crew.
Sinbad	Norway	The barque was driven ashore at Cuckmere Haven, Sussex, United Kingdom. All sixteen people on board were rescued. She was on a voyage from London to Pensacola, Florida, United States.
Voluntas	France	The ship was driven ashore and severely damaged in Pegwell Bay. She was on a voyage from Hull, Yorkshire to Cette, Hérault. She was later refloated and towed in to Ramsgate.
Walcred	United Kingdom	The steamship was driven ashore at Össby, Öland. She was on a voyage from Riga to London. She was refloated the next day and resumed her voyage.
Young George	United Kingdom	The dandy rigged fishing smack collided with the schooner Burton and sank at Lowestoft, Suffolk. Her ten crew were rescued.
Unnamed	Norway	The barque was driven ashore at Deal, Kent, United Kingdom and was abandoned with the loss of two of the 27 people on board. Survivors were rescued by the Deal Lifeboat.
Unnamed	Flag unknown	The ship was driven ashore at Deal. Her crew were rescued.
Unnamed	Belgium	The ship sank off the North Foreland, Kent.
Two unnamed vessels	Flags unknown	The ships were driven ashore in Pegwell Bay.
Unnamed	Flag unknown	The barque sank off Broadstairs, Kent with the loss of all hands.
Unnamed	flag unknown	The barque was wrecked on the Goodwin Sands with the loss of all hands.
Unnamed	France	The brig was driven ashore between Broadstairs and Ramsgate. Her crew were rescued.

== 13 November ==
List of shipwrecks: 13 November 1877
Ship	State	Description
Conde de Cavour	Portugal	The ship was wrecked at Viana do Castelo with the loss of all hands.
Fifteenth July	Germany	The brig was driven ashore on Falsterbo, Sweden. She was on a voyage from Liepāja, Courland Governorate to Bremerhaven.
H. C. Drosse	Germany	The schooner departed from West Hartlepool, County Durham, United Kingdom for Torre del Mar, Spain. No further trace, reported missing.
Maria Beerta	United Kingdom	The ship was driven ashore on Læsø, Denmark. She was on a voyage from Härnösand, Sweden to Harlingen, Friesland.
Monsoon	United Kingdom	The ship was driven ashore at Kilkeel, County Down.
Paul et Marie	France	The schooner, with a cargo of wheat, was dismasted after hitting the Seven Stones Reef, Cornwall, United Kingdom. She was later brought into the nearby Isles of Scilly as a derelict.
Sif	Norway	The barque ran aground off Scotstoun Head, Aberdeenshire and was severely damaged. She was on a voyage from Swinemünde, Germany to Grangemouth, Stirlingshire, United Kingdom. She was refloated the next day and towed in to Peterhead, Aberdeenshire, where she ran aground.
Surprise	United Kingdom	The schooner ran aground at "Kalle", Denmark.
Yberra Palmeiro	Spain	The steamship was driven ashore and wrecked near Viana do Castelo. She was on a voyage from Cádiz to A Coruña.
Unnamed	Flag unknown	The ship was driven ashore and wrecked on Ramsey Island, Pembrokeshire, United Kingdom.

== 14 November ==
List of shipwrecks: 14 November 1877
Ship	State	Description
Alexander Young	United States	The schooner was run down and sunk by the steamship City of Brussels (United Kingdom) at New York with the loss of two of her six crew.
Arjete	Austria-Hungary	The barque ran aground on the Grado Sandbank, in the Adriatic Sea and sank. She was on a voyage from Cartagena, Spain to Capodistria.
Atrato	United Kingdom	The barque ran aground on the Barnard Sand, in the North Sea off the coast of Suffolk. She was on a voyage from Sundsvall, Sweden to Shoreham-by-Sea, Sussex. She was refloated and taken in to Lowestoft, Suffolk.
Brisk	United Kingdom	The brigantine was abandoned in the Atlantic Ocean. Her crew were rescued by the barque Ida (Italy). She was towed in to A Coruña, Spain in early January 1878.
Charles	United Kingdom	The ship was sighted off Gorleston, Suffolk whilst on a voyage from South Shields, County Durham to Dover, Kent. No further trace, presumed foundered with the loss of all hands.
Fairy	United Kingdom	The schooner was driven ashore and wrecked at Saddell, Argyllshire. Her crew were rescued. She was on a voyage from "Imtock" to Campbeltown, Argyllshire.
Glenbrook	United Kingdom	The brig was wrecked on the Bahama Bank, off Nuevitas, Cuba.
Ora et Labora	Norway	The brig sprang a leak and was abandoned off Peterhead, Aberdeenshire, United Kingdom. Her crew were rescued by the schooner Helene Maria (Germany). Ora et Labora was on a voyage from Kristiansand to Sunderland, County Durham, United Kingdom.
Zone	(United Kingdom of Great Britain and Ireland) Isle of Man	The ship departed from Pillau, Germany for Belfast, County Antrim. No further trace, reported missing.
Unnamed	Flag unknown	The brigantine ran aground on the Goodwin Sands, Kent.

== 15 November ==
List of shipwrecks: 15 November 1877
Ship	State	Description
Adventure	United Kingdom	The ship was abandoned in the Irish Sea. Her crew were rescued. Wreckage subsequently came ashore at Great Orme Head, Caernarfonshire.
Ajax	Germany	The steamship was abandoned off the Dutch coast by all but her captain. A smack took off the rest of her crew. She was on a voyage from Königsberg to Antwerp, Belgium. She was assisted in to Harwich, Essex, United Kingdom on 18 November by five smacks and two tugs.
Amanda	Germany	The barque was abandoned in the North Sea. Her crew were rescued by the brig Taxearchis Dockos (Greece).
Annie and Jane	United Kingdom	The schooner was driven ashore at Maidens, Ayrshire. She was on a voyage from Beaumaris, Anglesey to Glasgow, Renfrewshire.
Eliza Jane	United Kingdom	The schooner ran aground on the Newcombe Sands, in the North Sea off the coast of Suffolk. She was on a voyage from Hull, Yorkshire to Chichester, Sussex. She was refloated and taken in to Lowestoft, where she ran aground again. She was refloated and found to be leaky.
Falcon	United Kingdom	The steamship ran aground at Queenstown, County Cork. She was refloated and resumed her voyage.
Fancy	United Kingdom	The schooner was sighted off Fraserburgh, Aberdeenshire whilst on a voyage from the River Tyne to Kirkwall, Orkney Islands. No further trace, presumed foundered with the loss of all hands.
Isabella	(United Kingdom of Great Britain and Ireland) Jersey	The brig was driven ashore at Redcar, Yorkshire. She was on a voyage from Newcastle upon Tyne, Northumberland to Poole, Dorset. She was refloated with the asstance of the tug Swan (United Kingdom) and towed in to Hartlepool, County Durham.
Kevasind	United Kingdom	The barque foundered in the Atlantic Ocean (48°38′N 33°18′W). Her twelve crew were rescued by the steamship England (United Kingdom).
Nurnberg	Germany	The steamship was driven ashore on Langeoog. She was on a voyage from Baltimore, Maryland, United States to Bremen.
Two Friends	Canada	The ship was driven out to sea from Gaspé, Quebec. No further trace.
William	United Kingdom	The schooner was driven ashore at Killiner's Point, Wigtownshire.
Unnamed	Flag unknown	The schooner was driven ashore at Redcar. She was refloated.

== 16 November ==
List of shipwrecks: 16 November 1877
Ship	State	Description
Agnes Campbell	Canada	The barque was abandoned in the Atlantic Ocean. Her crew were rescued by a Danish schooner. She was on a voyage from Alloa, Clackmannanshire, United Kingdom to Shelburne, Nova Scotia.
Argyllshire	United Kingdom	The barque was driven ashore at Howquay Head Holm, Orkney Islands. Her crew were rescued. She was on a voyage from Amsterdam, North Holland, Netherlands to Glasgow, Renfrewshire. She was refloated on 9 February 1878 and beached in Holm Sound.
Fancy	United Kingdom	The schooner foundered in the North Sea with the loss of all hands. She was on a voyage from Newcastle upon Tyne, Northumberland to Kirkwall, Orkney Islands.
Foroningsen Odensa	Denmark	The schooner foundered in the North Sea with the loss of all but two of her crew. Survivors were rescued by Sceptre (United Kingdom).
Hermann	Sweden	The ship was driven ashore and wrecked at Landsort, Sweden. Her crew were rescued. She was on a voyage from Stettin to Stockholm, Sweden.
Isabella Wilson	United Kingdom	The barquentine was driven ashore on Flotta, Orkney Islands. She was refloated on 24 November and taken in to Stromness, Orkney Islands for repairs.
Jeannie Marshall	United Kingdom	The schooner was wrecked on the Boulmer Rocks, on the coast of Northumberland.
Johanna	Flag unknown	The brigantine was driven ashore at Sutton-on-Sea, Lincolnshire, United Kingdom. She was on a voyage from Riga, Russia to Dieppe, Seine-Inférieure, France. She was refloated and taken in to Grimsby, Lincolnshire.
Lindley	Norway	The brig was driven ashore on Flotta. She was consequently condemned. She was refloated in December and towed in to Stromness.
Nuevo Primera Barreras	Spain	The steamship arrived at Cádiz from Málaga on fire. She was scuttled.
Phœbe	United Kingdom	The brig was driven ashore at "North Walls", Orkney Islands. She was on a voyage from Norway to Seaham, County Durham. She was refloated on 26 November and taken in to for Seaham.
Ribston	United Kingdom	The barque was driven ashore and wrecked at Brill, Macassar, Cape Colony. Her crew were rescued. She was on a voyage from New York, United States to Yokohama, Japan.
Robert	United Kingdom	The schooner was driven ashore at Brockness Point, Orkney Islands.
Theobe	United Kingdom	The brig was driven ashore at Brockness Point.
Two Brothers	United Kingdom	The smack was driven ashore and severely damaged in the River Tay. She was refloated and beached at Dundee, Forfarshire.
Unnamed	United Kingdom	The ship was wrecked whilst on a voyage from Dungarvan, County Waterford to Loch Maddy.
Two unnamed vessels	Flags unknown	The ships were wrecked at Thurso. Their crew were rescued.
Unnamed	Norway	The barque was driven ashore at the "Maize Lighthouse".
Unnamed	Flag unknown	The ship was driven ashore at Deerness, Orkney Islands.

== 17 November ==
List of shipwrecks: 17 November 1877
Ship	State	Description
Aleppo	United Kingdom	The brigantine was abandoned in the Atlantic Ocean. Her crew were rescued by the steamship Zephyr (United States). Aleppo was on a voyage from Liverpool, Lancashire to Sydney, Nova Scotia, Canada.
Attila	United Kingdom	The ship put in to Anjer, Netherlands East Indies on fire. She was on a voyage from Newcastle upon Tyne, Northumberland to Batavia, Netherlands East Indies.
Elwine C. Z.	Flag unknown	The ship was wrecked at Reawick, Shetland Islands, United Kingdom.
Fanny Saalfield	Germany	The barque was driven ashore and wrecked on Graemsay, Orkney Islands. Her crew were rescued. She was on a voyage from Liverpool to Barth.
Glance	United Kingdom	The schooner ran aground at Montevideo, Uruguay.
Golden Fleece	United States	The ship ran aground on the English Bank, in the River Plate and was severely damaged. She was on a voyage from New York to San Francisco, California. She was refloated and taken in to Montevideo, Uruguay.
Ida	Germany	The ship waswrecked on Shapinsay, Orkney Islands. Her crew were rescued. She was on a voyage from "Stockwiken" to Wick, Caithness, United Kingdom.
James A. Wright	United Kingdom	The ship was driven ashore on North Uist, Outer Hebrides. Her crew survived. She was on a voyage from Liverpool, Lancashire to a port in the Grand Duchy of Finland.
Kensett	United States	The schooner was abandoned in the Atlantic Ocean. Her thirteen crew were rescued by the steamship Baltic (United Kingdom). Kensett was on a voyage from Liverpool to New York.
Leicester	United Kingdom	The ship was driven ashore on Gebe, Netherlands East Indies. She was on a voyage from China to London. She was refloated.
Right of Way	United Kingdom	The ship was driven ashore and wrecked at Stromness, Orkney Islands. Her crew were rescued. She was on a voyage from Danzig, Germany to Larne, County Antrim.
Strathtay	United Kingdom	The steamship was driven ashore and wrecked on Langlade Island. Her crew were rescued. She was on a voyage from Montreal, Quebec, Canada to Aberdeen.

== 18 November ==
List of shipwrecks: 18 November 1877
Ship	State	Description
Albanian, and Nydia	United Kingdom	The steamship Albanian collided with the barque Nydia off Great Orme Head, Caernarfonshire. Both vessels sank; Albanian with the loss of two of her crew and Nydia with the loss of a crew member. Albanian was on a voyage from Liverpool, Lancashire to Genoa and Livorno, Italy. Her survivors were rescued by the tug Great Emperor (United Kingdom). Nydia was on a voyage from Liverpool to Savannah, Georgia, United States. Her survivors were rescued by the tug Black Prince (United Kingdom).
Alekto	Norway	The brig was driven ashore and wrecked at "Gugarn", Gotland, Sweden. Her crew were rescued. She was on a voyage from Umeå, Sweden to Montrose, Forfarshire, United Kingdom.
Angus	United Kingdom	The ship was wrecked on South Ronaldshay, Orkney Islands, United Kingdom with the loss of her captain. She was on a voyage from Pillau, Germany to Belfast, County Antrim.
Contest	United Kingdom	The steamship was driven ashore at Margate, Kent. She was on a voyage from Ghent, East Flanders, Belgium to London. She was refloated the next day and resumed her voyage.
Ebenezer	Netherlands	The schooner ran aground on Dragør, Denmark. She was on a voyage from Peterhead, Aberdeenshire, United Kingdom to a Baltic port. She was refloated and taken in to Copenhagen, Denmark.
Parat	Norway	The ship was driven ashore at Polangen, Courland Governorate. Her crew were rescued.

== 19 November ==
List of shipwrecks: 19 November 1877
Ship	State	Description
Brodernes Haab	Sweden	The ship was wrecked at Gothenburg. She was on a voyage from Leith, Lothian, United Kingdom to Gothenburg.
Golden Fleece	United States	The clipper ran aground on the English Bank, in the River Plate. She was on a voyage from New York to San Francisco, California. She was refloated and put in to Montevideo, Uruguay. She was consquently condemned.
Mulberry	United Kingdom	The ship sank at Topsham, Devon. Her crew survived. She was on a voyage from Countess Wear to Topsham.
Orion	Norway	The ship was severely damaged at Gothenburg. She was on a voyage from Christiania to Leith.
Petrel	United Kingdom	The barque was lost off Vitória, Brazil. She was on a voyage from Cardiff, Glamorgan to Vitória.
Svalan	Sweden	The ship was severely damaged at Gothenburg. She was on a voyage from Söderhamn to Wisbech, Cambridgeshire, United Kingdom.

== 20 November ==
List of shipwrecks: 20 November 1877
Ship	State	Description
Alciope	United Kingdom	The ship ran aground on the Holm Sand, in the North Sea off the coast of Suffolk. She was refloated and beached at Lowestoft, Suffolk, being waterlogged.
Annie Bingay	(Canada)	The ship ran aground at Belfast, County Antrim, United Kingdom. She was on a voyage from Baltimore, Maryland, United States to Belfast.
Stolpemunde	United Kingdom	The ship departed from the River Tyne for Cartagena, Spain. She subsequently foundered in the North Sea with the loss of all eleven crew. Wreckage washed up on the Sizewell Bank, off the coast of Suffolk.

== 21 November ==
List of shipwrecks: 21 November 1877
Ship	State	Description
Alpheta	United Kingdom	The barque was wrecked on the Bembridge Ledge, off Bembridge, Isle of Wight. All twelve people on board were rescued by the Bembridge Lifeboat and two fishing boats. She was on a voyage from Amsterdam, North Holland, Netherlands to Shoreham-by-Sea, Sussex. She was refloated on 6 March and beached at Ryde, Isle of Wight.
Anna Maria	Denmark	The galiot was driven ashore on Skagen. She was on a voyage from Charleston, South Carolina, United States to Nykøbing Falster.
Anstruther	United Kingdom	The barque collided with the steamship Ohio (United States) at Liverpool, Lancashire and was severely damaged. She was beached at Egremont, Lancashire in a waterlogged condition. She was refloated on 28 November and beached at New Ferry, Cheshire.
Concordia	United Kingdom	The barque departed from Liverpool for Valparaíso, Chile. She was subsequently abandoned at sea. Her crew were rescued by Beta (United Kingdom). Concordia was discovered in the South Atlantic in March by Jane Sprott (United Kingdom.
Edith	United Kingdom	The barque departed from Blyth, Northumberland for Cape Town, Cape Colony. No further trace, presumed foundered with the loss of all hands.
Hibernia	United Kingdom	The cable-laying ship ran aground and broke in two at Alagoas, Brazil. Her 102 crew were rescued. Her crew.
Jules Estelle	France	The ship was driven ashore near Margate, Kent, United Kingdom. She was refloated in December and towed in to Ramsgate, Kent.
Julius Degner	Germany	The ship sank. Her crew were rescued.
Springbok	United Kingdom	The barque was abandoned in the North Sea 150 nautical miles (280 km) off the coat of Lothian. Her crew were rescued by the barque Christian (Denmark). Springbok was on a voyage from Berwick upon Tweed, Northumberland to Burntisland, Fife. She was subsequently towed into the Nieuwe Diep in a derelict condition.
Weldaad	Germany	The schooner was driven ashore on Texel, North Holland, Netherlands. Her crew were rescued. She was on a voyage from Norden to London, United Kingdom.
Wyvern	United Kingdom	The Mersey Flat was driven into a bridge and sank at Runcorn, Cheshire. Both crew were rescued by the Mersey Flat Prince of Wales (United Kingdom).

== 22 November ==
List of shipwrecks: 22 November 1877
Ship	State	Description
Arrow	United Kingdom	The ship struck a rock at Howth, County Dublin and sank. Her crew were rescued. She was on a voyage from Glasgow, Renfrewshire to Saint-Malo, Ille-et-Vilaine, France.
Birmingham	United Kingdom	The ship was driven ashore at Liverpool, Lancashire. She was on a voyage from Quebec City, Canada to Liverpool. She was refloated and taken in to Liverpool.
Ceres	United Kingdom	The full-rigged ship ran aground on The Manacles, Cornwall and was abandoned by her 23 crew, who were rescued by the Porthoustock Lifeboat. Ceres was on a voyage from Moulmein, Burma to Falmouth, Cornwall. She was reboared and towed in to Falmouth by the tugs Pendragon and Victor (both United Kingdom). She was found to be severely damaged, having broken her back.
Chin Yang	Canada	The barque ran aground on the Warden Ledge Rocks, off the Isle of Wight, United Kingdom. She was refloated on 3 December and towed in to Southampton, Hampshire, United Kingdom in a severely damaged condition. Whilst being towed, she collided with Etoile de la Mer (France) off Yarmouth, Isle of Wight.
Fiery Cross	United Kingdom	The smack collided with the Bull Lightship ( Trinity House) and was severely damaged. She was assisted in to Grimsby, Lincolnshire in a severely leaky condition.
Gauntlet	United Kingdom	The ship foundered off Ouessant, Finistère, France. Eight crew survived. She was on a voyage from Cardiff, Glamorgan to Pernambuco, Brazil.
Skogmar	Sweden	The ship was driven ashore north of Kronberg Point, Denmark. She was on a voyage from Gävle Sweden to London.

== 23 November ==
List of shipwrecks: 23 November 1877
Ship	State	Description
Argo	United Kingdom	The ship was driven ashore at Berck, Pas-de-Calais, France. Her crew were rescued. She was on a voyage from New York, United States to Rotterdam, South Holland, Netherlands. She was consequently condemned and sold.
Armstrong	Canada	The ship was driven ashore at Dutton, Cumberland, United Kingdom. She was on a voyage from Fleetwood, Lancashire, United Kingdom to New Orleans, Louisiana, United States. She had broken her back by 26 November and was declared a total loss.
Bohemian	United Kingdom	The ship ran aground on the Bristol Bank, in Liverpool Bay. She was on a voyage from Boston, Massachusetts, United States to Liverpool, Lancashire. She was refloated and towed in to the River Mersey.
Celine Madeline	France	The ship ran aground on the English Bank, in the River Plate and was wrecked. Her crew were rescued. She was on a voyage from Marseille, Bouches-du-Rhône to Buenos Aires, Argentina.
Ceres	Netherlands	The schooner ran aground on the Noord Hinder Bank, in the North Sea and was abandoned. Her crew were rescued. She was on a voyage from Burntisland, Fife, United Kingdom to Dordrecht, South Holland.
Esperance	United Kingdom	The ship was abandoned in the Atlantic Ocean. Her crew were rescued by Westminster (United Kingdom). Esperance was on a voyage from the Newfoundland Colony to Swansea, Glamorgan.
Fred and Eugene	United States	The schooner foundered 2 nautical miles (3.7 km) off Ynys Llanddwyn, Anglesey, United Kingdom with the loss of two of her eleven crew. Survivors were rescued by the Llanddwyn Lifeboat. She was on a voyage from Troon, Ayrshire, United Kingdom to Matanzas, Cuba.
Geertruida	Netherlands	The schooner was driven ashore in Aalbeck Bay. She was on a voyage from Riga, Russia to Schiedam, South Holland.
James Carthy	United Kingdom	The schooner was driven ashore and wrecked at Holyhead, Anglesey. Her ten crew were rescued by the Holyhead Lifeboat Thomas Fielden ( Royal National Lifeboat Institution) and a tug. She was on a voyage from Liverpool to Bahia, Brazil.
John Craich	United Kingdom	The schooner was driven ashore at Ardglass, County Down. She was refloated.
Molly	Germany	The ship was driven ashore near Vlissingen, Zeeland, Netherlands. She was on a voyage from Antwerp, Belgium to Buenos Aires, Argentina.
Proeven	Denmark	The brig was driven ashore on Læsø. She was refloated and resumed her voyage.
Tamerlane	United States	The ship was driven ashore near Terneuzen, Zeeland. She was on a voyage from Antwerp to Philadelphia, Pennsylvania.
Witness	United Kingdom	The barque was driven ashore and wrecked at Clynnog Fawr, Caernarfonshire. She was on a voyage from Troon, Ayrshire to Demerara, British Honduras.

== 24 November ==
List of shipwrecks: 24 November 1877
Ship	State	Description
Aldrum	United Kingdom	The ship was driven ashore at Lowestoft, Suffolk. She was on a voyage from Grimsby, Lincolnshire to Lowestoft.
Alexander Murray	United Kingdom	The schooner was driven ashore south of Lowestoft. Her crew were rescued by the Coastguard using rocket apparatus.
Celeste	United Kingdom	The brigantine was driven ashore in Tor Bay with the loss of at least three lives. There were two survivors.
Constance	France	The ship was driven ashore at Deal, Kent, United Kingdom. Her seven crew were rescued.
Coral Queen	United Kingdom	The ship ran aground at the Round Head, County Durham. She was on a voyage from Sunderland, County Durham to Gothenburg, Sweden. She was refloated and put back to Sunderland.
Donna Maria	United Kingdom	The barque was driven ashore and wrecked at Newhaven, Sussex. Her ten crew were rescued by Express (United Kingdom). Donna Maria was on a voyage from the River Tyne to Savona, Italy.
Gustave	France	The ship was driven ashore and wrecked at Deal. Her seven crew were rescued. She was on a voyage from Memel, Germany to Granville, Manche.
USS Huron	United States Navy	The sloop-rigged steam gunboat stranded in a gale three miles (4.8 km) south of the Nags Head, North Carolina Life Saving Station and later broke up. Ninety-seven of her 135 crew were lost. Captain Gutherie, Superintendent of the 6th District of the United States Life Saving Service lost his life during rescue operations. USS Huron was on a voyage from Fortress Monroe, Virginia to Havana, Cuba.
John and Thomas	United Kingdom	The schooner was driven ashore at Hartlepool, County Durham. Her four crew were rescued by the Coastguard. She subsequently broke up.
Kashgar	United Kingdom	The steamship ran aground in the Suez Canal at Suez, Egypt. She was refloated on 26 November.
Paul Ernst	Germany	The ship was driven ashore near "Zandoret". She was on a voyage from Hamburg to Landerneau, Finistère, France.
Petrel	United Kingdom	The steamship was severely damaged at Dover, Kent.
Pioneer	United Kingdom	The steamship was severely damaged at Dover.
Queen, or Queen of Dartmouth	United Kingdom	The ship collided with Deal Pier, Kent and was driven ashore with the loss of three of her six crew.
Uniac	Portugal	The schooner was wrecked in the Rio Grande.

== 25 November ==
List of shipwrecks: 25 November 1877
Ship	State	Description
Aaltje Holtmann	Netherlands	The schooner was wrecked at Gioia Tauro, Sardinia, Italy. Her crew were rescued.
Alarm	United Kingdom	The sloop was driven ashore at Lowestoft, Suffolk. Her crew were rescued.
Amine	(United Kingdom of Great Britain and Ireland) Guernsey	The brig was driven ashore at Kingsdown, Kent. Her crew were rescued by rocket apparatus. She was on a voyage from Great Yarmouth, Norfolk to Guernsey.
Alice	United Kingdom	The steamship was sighted off Madeira whilst on a voyage from the west coast of Africa to an English port. No further trace, presumed foundered with the loss of all sixteen crew.
Annie Ketch	United Kingdom	The schooner was driven ashore at Margate, Kent. Her crew were rescued.
Beverley	United Kingdom	The schooner ran aground on the East Barrow Sand, in the North Sea off the coast of Essex. Her crew were rescued by the smack Emily (United Kingdom). Beverley was on a voyage from a Scottish port to Portsmouth, Hampshire.
Charles Davenport	United Kingdom	The barque, which had previously been wrecked, drove through Margate Pier, Kent, trapping people on the seaward side of the break.
Charlotte, and Diligence	Norway; United Kingdom	The schooner Charlotte collided with Diligence and was severely damaged at the bow. She was on a voyage from Sundsvall, Sweden to Littlehampton, Sussex. She was towed in to Dover, Kent by a French steamship. Diligence was severely damaged. She was towed in to Dover in a leaky condition by a tug.
Commodore	(United Kingdom of Great Britain and Ireland) Jersey	The schooner was driven from her moorings at Margate, Kent and was beached near Whitstable. She was refloated.
Eagle	United Kingdom	The schooner was driven ashore at Margate. Her crew were rescued.
Eliza Blaydon	United Kingdom	The schooner was driven ashore at Margate. Her crew were rescued. She was refloated in early December.
Florence Nightingale	United Kingdom	The schooner was driven ashore at Margate. Her crew were rescued.
Gustave	France	The brigantine was driven ashore and wrecked at Deal. Her crew were rescued.
Haabet	Norway	The barque was driven ashore at Kingsdown. Her crew were rescued. She was on a voyage from Norway to Bristol, Gloucestershire, United Kingdom.
Havre	United Kingdom	The ship ran aground at Maassluis, South Holland, Netherlands. She was refloated.
Hero	United Kingdom	The barque was driven ashore near Whitstable. Her fifteen crew were rescued by the Margate Lifeboat. She was on a voyage from South Shields, County Durham to Garrucha, Spain.
Humility	United Kingdom	The ship was driven ashore at Whitstable.
Industry	United Kingdom	The ship was driven ashore at Margate. Her crew were rescued by the Margate Lifeboat.
Isabella	United Kingdom	The barque was abandoned off Dunkirk, Nord, France. Her crew were rescued. She was on a voyage from Havana, Cuba to Hamburg, Germany. She was subsequently taken in to Dunkirk.
Jane Cameron	United Kingdom	The schooner was driven onto the Nayland Rock, Margate. Her five crew were rescued by the Broadstairs Lifeboat. She was later refloated and taken in to Ramsgate.
Laubet	Norway	The barque was driven ashore at Kingsdown. Her crew were rescued by rocket apparatus.
Lilian	United Kingdom	The brigantine was driven through Deal Pier, Kent and was wrecked with the loss of three of her crew. She was on a voyage from Dartmouth, Devon to South Shields.
Lord Byron	United Kingdom	The steamship ran aground on the Hinder Bank, in the North Sea off Goeree, Zeeland, Netherlands. She was on a voyage from Maryport, Cumberland to Rotterdam, South Holland, Netherlands. She was refloated.
Louisa	United Kingdom	The schooner was driven from her moorings at Margate and was beached on the Oaze Sand with assistance from the Margate Lifeboat.
Maheley	France	The barque was driven ashore at Kingsdown with the loss of two lives. Survivors were rescued by rocket apparatus. She was on a voyage from Hamburg, Germany to Africa.
Pallas	France	The brig was driven ashore at Margate. Her crew were rescued.
Polymede	United Kingdom	The ship was driven ashore at Margate. Her crew were rescued.
Quebec Packet	United Kingdom	The brig was driven ashore and wrecked at Margate. Her crew were rescued. She was on a voyage from South Shields to Rouen, Seine-Inférieure, France.
Republic	France	The schooner was driven ashore at Kingsdown with the loss of two of her crew.
Result	United Kingdom	The schooner was wrecked off Cap Gris Nez, Pas-de-Calais, France. Her five crew were rescued.
Robert and Hannah	United Kingdom	The brig was driven ashore at Margate. Her crew were rescued. She was refloated in early December.
Salve Regina	France	The ship was driven ashore at Margate. She was on a voyage from South Shields to Quimper, Finistère. She was refloated in early December.
Sarah Ann	United Kingdom	The schooner was driven onto the Nayland Rock. Her crew were rescued. She was later refloated and assisted in to Whitstable.
Seaflower	United Kingdom	The schooner was driven ashore at Margate. Her crew were rescued.
Star of the Ocean	United Kingdom	The ship was driven ashore at Kingsdown. Her crew were rescued by rocket apparatus. She was on a voyage from Plymouth, Devon to South Shields, County Durham.
Sumus	United Kingdom	The steamship ran aground in the Scheldt at "Willemsick", Antwerp Province, Belgium. She was on a voyage from Middlesbrough, Yorkshire to Antwerp, Belgium.
Triade	Austria-Hungary	The barque was driven onto the Longnose Rock, Margate. Her crew were rescued. She was refloated on 2 February 1878 with assistance from the tugs Aid and Vulcan (both United Kingdom) and towed in to Ramsgate.
Water Lily	United Kingdom	The schooner was driven ashore at Margate. Her crew were rescued. She was on a voyage from Goole, Yorkshire to Naples, Italy. She was refloated in early December and taken in to Ramsgate for repairs.
Margate Lifeboat	Royal National Lifeboat Institution	The lifeboat was severely damaged whilst going to the assistance of the barque Hero (United Kingdom).
Unnamed	United States	The ship was driven ashore at the mouth of the River Duddon.

== 26 November ==
List of shipwrecks: 26 November 1877
Ship	State	Description
Ann Lovett	United Kingdom	The schooner was driven ashore on Mew Island, in the Copeland Island, County Down with the loss of a crew member. She was on a voyage from Whitehaven, Cumberland to Dublin.
Anna Maria	United Kingdom	The barque sank in the English Channel 5 nautical miles (9.3 km) off Fairlight, Sussex.
Argo	United Kingdom	The ship was driven ashore at Blyth, Northumberland. She was on a voyage from London to Sunderland, County Durham She was later refloated and towed in to Sunderland.
Armstrong	United Kingdom	The ship was driven ashore at Silecroft, Cumberland. She was on a voyage from Fleetwood, Lancashire to New Orleans, Louisiana, United States.
Calewick	United Kingdom	The brigantine was abandoned in the North Sea. Her crew were rescued. She was on a voyage from Brake, Germany to a Norwegian port. Calewick was subsequently towed in to Cuxhaven, Germany by the steamship Marianne Briggs (United Kingdom)
Concordia	Netherlands	The ship departed from Pillau, Germany for Groningen. No further trace, reported missing.
Eliza	United Kingdom	The schooner foundered off the mouth of the Humber. Her crew were rescued by the schooner Rebecca (United Kingdom). Eliza was on a voyage from Orford, Suffolk to Grimsby, Lincolnshire.
Express	United Kingdom	The smack was driven ashore at Blue Anchor, Somerset. She was on a voyage from Cardiff, Glamorgan to Watchet, Somerset.
Griefswald	Germany	The barque was driven ashore and wrecked between IJmuiden and Zandvoort, North Holland, Netherlands with the loss of her captain. At least four people were rescued.
Havre	France	The steamship ran aground at Maassluis, South Holland, Netherlands. She was refloated.
Johan Lang	Flag unknown	The ship was wrecked on the Hereford Bar. She was on a voyage from Bordeaux, Gironde, France to Philadelphia, Pennsylvania, United States.
Nachtigall	Russia	The schooner ran aground at Domesnes. She was on a voyage from Pärnu to Stettin, Germany.
Onward	United Kingdom	The smack was wrecked near Mablethorpe, Lincolnshire with the loss of a crew member.
Ossipee	United States	The ship was driven ashore at the Ragged Point Lighthouse, Maryland. She was on a voyage from Dénia, Spain to New York.
Piccadilly	Cape Colony	The ship was wrecked in the Ratel River.
Royal Alice	United Kingdom	The ship was driven ashore at New York, United States. She was on a voyage from Calcutta, India to New York. She was refloated.
San Geronimo	Flag unknown	The ship ran aground in Tor Bay. She was on a voyage from Antwerp, Belgium to "Vianna". She was refloated and towed in to Dartmouth, Devon, United Kingdom.
Veranda	United Kingdom	The schooner struck a rock in Yell Sound and became waterlogged.
Vier Gebroeders	Netherlands	The ship foundered in the North Sea off the coast of South Holland.
No. 8	United Kingdom	The steam hopper ran aground on Taylor's Bank, in Liverpool Bay. Her crew were rescued by the Liverpool Lifeboat. She was refloated with assistance from four tugs and taken in to Liverpool, Lancashire.

== 27 November ==
List of shipwrecks: 27 November 1877
Ship	State	Description
Adia	United Kingdom	The smack was driven ashore at Aberthaw, Glamorgan. She was on a voyage from Barnstaple, Devon to Newport, Monmouthshire.
Dagny	Norway	The barque ran aground on the Haaks Bank, in the North Sea off the Dutch coast. She was refloated and taken in to the Nieuwe Diep.
Harmone	Flag unknown	The schooner was driven ashore at Aberthaw.
Henrike	Flag unknown	The ship foundered off Bornholm, Denmark. Her crew were rescued. She was on a voyage from Saint Petersburg, Russia to Málaga, Spain.
Hermann Heinrich	Germany	The ship was wrecked north of Bergen, Norway. She was on a voyage from "Soroka" to Liverpool, Lancashire, United Kingdom.
Walkyrien	Denmark	The barque was driven ashore on Dragør. She was on a voyage from Pori, Grand Duchy of Finland to Bristol, Gloucestershire, United Kingdom. She was refloated with assistance.

== 28 November ==
List of shipwrecks: 28 November 1877
Ship	State	Description
Admiral	United Kingdom	The schooner was driven ashore and wrecked at Methil, Fife. Her crew were rescued.
Annie	United Kingdom	The ship was damaged by fire at Portalegre, Portugal.
Cairngorm	United Kingdom	The full-rigged ship was driven ashore on Mew Island, in the Copeland Islands, County Down and sank. Her crew survived. She was on a voyage from Greenock, Renfrewshire to Pensacola, Florida, United States. She was refloated on 4 December and taken in to Greenock.
Earl of Uxbridge	United Kingdom	The schooner was driven ashore and wrecked on Walney Island, Lancashire. She was on a voyage from Bangor, Caernarfonshire to Barrow-in-Furness, Lancashire.
Echo	(United Kingdom of Great Britain and Ireland) Guernsey	The dandy ran aground on the Doom Bar. She was on a voyage from Guernsey to Padstow, Cornwall. She was refloated and taken in to Padstow.
Padre Francesco	Italy	The barque ran aground on the Gunnet Rocks. She was on a voyage from New York, United States to Leith, Lothian, United Kingdom. She was refloated and taken in to Leith in a leaky condition.
Trinidad	Denmark	The barque ran aground on the Spijker Plaat, in the North Sea off the Dutch coast.

== 29 November ==
List of shipwrecks: 29 November 1877
Ship	State	Description
Baker	Austria-Hungary	The brigantine was driven ashore at Sandgate, Kent, United Kingdom. She was on a voyage from South Shields, County Durham, United Kingdom to Bahia, Brazil.
Margaret	United Kingdom	The steamship capsized and sank with the loss of eleven of her twenty crew. Survivors took to a lifeboat but only one of them was alive when rescued on 2 December by the steamship Rivera (Spain). Margaret was on a voyage from Cardiff, Glamorgan to Malta.
Miami	United Kingdom	The barque struck and uncharted rock and was wrecked in Molle Bay, near Iquique, Peru.
Panther	United Kingdom	The steamship ran aground off Blankenese, Germany. She was on a voyage from Hamburg, Germany to London. She was refloated on 5 December and towed in to Hamburg.
Satellite	United Kingdom	The schooner ran aground on the Kentish Knock. Her crew were rescued. She was on a voyage from London to the West Indies. She was refloated and taken in to Harwich, Essex in a waterlogged and derelict condition.
Vala	Sweden	The schooner was driven ashore in the Kalmar Strait. She was on a voyage from Örnsköldsvik to an English port. She was refloated in late December and towed in to Kalmar.

== 30 November ==
List of shipwrecks: 30 November 1877
Ship	State	Description
Atacama	United Kingdom	The steamship was wrecked at the mouth of the Copiapó River with the loss of 104 of the 130 people on board. She was on a voyage from Valparaíso to Caldera, Chile, Callao, Peru and Panama City, United States of Colombia.
Franklin	Norway	The barque ran aground on the Longsand, in the North Sea off the coast of Essex, United Kingdom. Her thirteen crew were rescued by a smack. Franklin was on a voyage from Riga, Russia to Havre de Grâce, Seine-Inférieure, France.
Westella	United Kingdom	The steamship ran aground on the Nore and was severely damaged. She was on a voyage from Gävle, Sweden to London.
Victoria	Argentina	The lighter was holed by an anchor and sank at Buenos Aires.
Vivid	United Kingdom	The ship was sighted in The Downs. No further trace, presumed foundered with the loss of all hands.

== Unknown date ==
List of shipwrecks: Unknown date in November 1877
Ship	State	Description
Aberlady	United Kingdom	The ship was wrecked in the Gaspar Strait. Her crew were rescued. She was on a voyage from Hong Kong, China to New York, United States.
Acme	Denmark	The ship ran aground off Hirsholmene. She was on a voyage from Leith, Lothian, United Kingdom to Nivå. She was refloated and taken in to Fredrikshavn.
Agra	United Kingdom	The ship was driven ashore and wrecked at Cape Traverse, Prince Edward Island, Canada.
Alibo	United Kingdom	The barque was reported lost.
Angostura	United Kingdom	The brig was abandoned at sea. Her crew were rescued.
Atalanta	Denmark	The barque ran aground on the Domesnes Reef, in the Baltic Sea before 17 November. She was refloated and towed in to Bolderāja, Russia in a waterlogged condition.
Baron Pahlen	Russia	The steamship ran aground in Kanholmsjärden. She was refloated on 8 November.
Batavia	Netherlands	The steamship was wrecked on Île Plane, Beylik of Tunis. Her passengers and crew were rescued.
Belle	United Kingdom	The ship was abandoned in the Atlantic Ocean before 19 November.
Bennigsen	Germany	The ship was wrecked in the Tonalá River.
Brilliant	United Kingdom	The ketch ran aground on the Barrow Sand in the North Sea off the coast of Essex. She was refloated with assistance from the smack New Unity (United Kingdom and taken in to the River Colne.
Catharina	Flag unknown	The schooner was wrecked at Agger, Denmark. Her crew were rescued. She was on a voyage from Stockholm, Sweden to West Hartlepool, County Durham, United Kingdom.
Centaur	United States	The ship was wrecked at Nuevitas, Cuba.
Charles Davenport	United Kingdom	The barque was wrecked after hitting a jetty in a storm at Margate, Kent. She was on a voyage from south Shields, County Durham to Cartagena, Spain.
Christopher Columbus	United Kingdom	The ship was driven ashore on Wolfe Island. She was on a voyage from Saint Vincent to Doboy, Georgia, United States. She was refloated in early December.
Commerce	United Kingdom	The schooner was abandoned in the English Channel off Black Head, Cornwall. Her crew survived.
Cutty Sark	United Kingdom	The clipper was driven from her moorings, collided with two other vessels and ran aground off Deal, Kent. She was refloated with assistance from the tug Macgregor (United Kingdom) and towed in to the River Thames for repairs.
De Ruyter	Belgium	The steamship ran aground in the Deûle near Lille, Nord, France. She was on a voyage from Antwerp to Brazil. She was refloated with assistance and resumed her voyage.
D. S. Boule	United Kingdom	The brig was abandoned in the Atlantic Ocean before 19 November. She was on a voyage from New York to Queenstown, County Cork.
Edmund	United Kingdom	The ship was lost with all hands. She was on a voyage from Sunderland, County Durham to Caen, Calvados, France.
Edward Vittery	United Kingdom	The ship was abandoned at sea with the loss of all hands. She was subsequently taken in to Gaspé, Quebec, Canada.
Eliza Svinoe	Sweden	The ship ran aground at Söderhamn. She was refloated and taken in to Stockholm for repairs.
Ellen Holt	United Kingdom	The ship ran aground at Tybee Island, Georgia, United States. She was refloated with assistance.
Emberiza	United Kingdom	The steamship was driven ashore at Kamouraska, Quebec. She was on a voyage from Montreal, Quebec to Queenstown.
Empress of India	United Kingdom	The ship ran aground on the Banjaard Sand, in the North Sea off the coast of Zeeland, Netherlands. She was on a voyage from Pabellón de Pica, Chile to Rotterdam, South Holland, Netherlands. She was a total loss.
Enchantress	United Kingdom	The barque was driven ashore in Rothes Bay. She was on a voyage from Saint John, New Brunswick, Canada to Ardrossan, Ayrshire. She was refloated on 26 November and resumed her voyage.
Enterprize	United Kingdom	The ship ran aground on the Goodwin Sands, Kent. She was on a voyage from London to Exmouth, Devon. She was refloated and taken in to Ramsgate, Kent in a severely leaky condition.
Epaminodas	United Kingdom	The barque was abandoned at sea before 5 November. She was on a voyage from Quebec City, Canada to the River Tyne.
Ero	Austria-Hungary	The ship was wrecked near "Caristo". She was on a voyage from Venice to Thessaloniki, Greece.
Francisco Ferrera	Flag unknown	The ship ran aground on the Longsand, in the North Sea off the coast of Essex. She was on a voyage from Antwerpto Montevideo, Uruguay. She was refloated with assistance from HMS Cherub (Royal Navy), which towed her in to Harwich, Essex.
Friedrich	Germany	The schooner was driven ashore in Aalbeck Bay. She was on a voyage from Riga, Russia to Delfzijl, Groningen, Netherlands. She was later refloated and taken in to Fredrikshald, Norway in a leaky condition.
Galeed	United Kingdom	The steamship ran aground off Öland, Sweden. She was on a voyage from Kronstadt, Russia to London. She was refloated and taken in to Copenhagen, Denmark in a leaky condition.
Gaston	France	The steamship sank at the mouth of the Vilaine. Her crew were rescued.
Granger	United States	The ship was wrecked on the Swallow Reefs. Her crew survived. She was on a voyage from Liverpool, Lancashire, United Kingdom to Manila, Spanish East Indies.
Gustav Deising	Germany	The brig was abandoned in the North Sea 120 nautical miles (220 km) east of the Isle of May, Fife, United Kingdom. Her crew were rescued by a Swedish steamship.
Happy Return	(United Kingdom of Great Britain and Ireland) Guernsey	The schooner was wrecked. Her eight crew were rescued by the Ramsgate Lifeboat.
Hannah	United Kingdom	The ship was driven ashore and wrecked on the coast of the Natal Colony.
Harewood	United Kingdom	The ship was abandoned at sea. Her crew were rescued by the full-rigged ship Minniehaha (United Kingdom). Harewood was on a voyage from Quebec City to the River Tyne.
Hattie G. Hall	United States	The barque was abandoned in the Atlantic Ocean. All on board were rescued by Angelina (United Kingdom). Hattie G. Hall was on a voyage from New York to a British port.
Hedwig	Flag unknown	The ship was wrecked at "Waidaghara".
Henry M. Hine	United Kingdom	The ship was driven ashore at Le Tréport, Seine-Inférieure France. She was on a voyage from Swansea, Glamorgan to Honfleur, Manche, France.
Home	United Kingdom	The ship ran aground in the Clyde. She was on a voyage from Quebec City to Greenock, Renfrewshire. She was refloated on 26 November and taken in to Greenock.
Ingeborg Emilie	Sweden	The ship was driven ashore west of Trelleborg.
Isabella and Jane	United Kingdom	The schooner was wrecked in the Solway Firth with the loss all three crew. She was on a voyage from Runcorn, Cheshire to Belfast, County Antrim.
Jane	United Kingdom	The ship collided with Lady Havelock ( (United Kingdom of Great Britain and Ireland) Guernsey) and sank off the North Foreland, Kent. Her crew were rescued.
Johanna	Germany	The schooner was driven ashore at Stettin. She was on a voyage from Riga to Stettin.
Juanita	Flag unknown	The ship ran aground on the Scar Bank and was wrecked.
Julia A. Merritt	Canada	The ship was driven ashore at Abersoch, Caernarfonshire, United Kingdom. Her crew were rescued. She was refloated in early December and towed in to Pwllheli, Caernarfonshire.
Kate	(United Kingdom of Great Britain and Ireland) Isle of Man	The schooner was wrecked. Her crew were rescued by the Thurso Lifeboat Charley Lloyd ( Royal National Lifeboat Institution).
Laurine	Norway	The barque was abandoned in the Atlantic Ocean before 2 November. Her crew were rescued by Watt (United Kingdom).
Leon Pancaldo	United Kingdom	The barque was driven ashore in Chesapeake Bay. She was on a voyage from Savona to Baltimore, Maryland, United States.
Lizzie Hobley	United Kingdom	The barque foundered between Dymchurch and Hythe, Kent with the loss of all hands. She was on a voyage from Haiti to a British port.
Ludwig	Flag unknown	The ran aground in Table Bay.
Mabel	United Kingdom	The ship was driven ashore and wrecked at Durban, Natal Colony with the loss of four of her crew.
Magellan	Canada	The schooner foundered in Lake Michigan with the loss of all nine crew. She was on a voyage from Chicago, Illinois, United States to Toronto, Ontario.
Margaret	United Kingdom	The ship was driven ashore. She was on a voyage from Söderhamnto London. She was refloated and taken in to Helsingør, Denmark where she arrived on 17 November.
Marie Elise	France	The barque was wrecked off Cape Agulhas, Cape Colony. All on board were rescued.
Mars	Netherlands	The ship was driven ashore in Douarnenez Bay.
Marie	Norway	The brig was wrecked near Stavanger. Her crew were rescued. She was on a voyage from Brevig to Aberdeen, United Kingdom.
Mary Coverdale	United Kingdom	The steamship ran aground in the Scheldt. She was on a voyage from Antwerp to South Shields. She was refloated and resumed her voyage.
Medusa	United Kingdom	The ship was abandoned in the Atlantic Ocean before 7 November. Her crew were rescued.
Melville Bryant	United States	The ship departed from Greenport, New York for Montevideo, Uruguay. She was lost before 7 February 1878.
Memento	New South Wales	The barque was wrecked on Porter's Island before 26 November.
Mimer	Norway	The ship ran aground on the Haaks Bank, off the Dutch coast. She was on a voyage from Memel, Germany to Gloucester, United Kingdom. She was refloated and assisted in to the Nieuwe Diep.
Molly	United Kingdom	The ship ran aground off Vlissingen, Zeeland, Netherlands. She was on a voyage from Antwerp to Buenos Aires, Argentina.
Montezuma	United States	The barque was abandoned at sea before 17 November.
Nef	(Russian Empire) Grand Duchy of Finland	The ship was driven ashore west of Trelleborg. She was refloated. She was on a voyage from Pori to Bristol, Gloucestershire, United Kingdom. She was later refloated and towed in to Copenhagen in a waterlogged condition.
Niger	United Kingdom	The steamship was driven ashore near the Kijkduin Lighthouse, North Holland, Netherlands. She was on a voyage from Kronstadt to London.
Northumbria	United Kingdom	The ship was driven ashore and wrecked on Anticosti Island, Quebec. Her crew were rescued. She was on a voyage from Montreal to Liverpool.
Ondine	France	The barque collided with a derelict vessel and was abandoned in the Atlantic Ocean before 25 November. Her crew were rescued.
Pet	United Kingdom	The fishing boat was wrecked. Her ten crew were rescued by the Lowestoft Lifeboat.
Petrea	United Kingdom	The barque was driven shore near Sydney, Nova Scotia, Canada before 7 November.
Pidgeon	United Kingdom	The ship was driven ashore in Ballyhenry Bay.
Queensbury	United Kingdom	The barque struck a sunken rock and foundered in the South China Sea. Her crew were rescued. She was on a voyage from New York to Yokohama, Japan.
Ragnvald Jarl	Norway	The ship was abandoned at sea. Her crew were rescued. She was on a voyage from Lisbon, Portugal to a Norwegian port.
Rainbow	United Kingdom	The steamship ran aground on the Glasmorgan Bank. She was on a voyage from Glasgow, Renfrewshire to Genoa, Italy.
Resoluda	United Kingdom	The ship was lost at Tilton Harbor, Newfoundland Colony. She was on a voyage from Betts Cove, Newfoundland Colony to Liverpool, Lancashire.
Reward	(United Kingdom of Great Britain and Ireland) Guernsey	The brig was wrecked. Her eight crew were rescued by the Ramsgate Lifeboat.
Sarah Saunders	United Kingdom	The ship was driven ashore north of New Ferry, Cheshire. She was on a voyage from Quebec City to Liverpool. She was refloated on 3 November and taken in to Liverpool.
Shoreham	United Kingdom	The steamship sank west of Shoreham-by-Sea, Sussex.
Sincerite	United Kingdom	The ship was wrecked at Agger. Her crew were rescued. She was on a voyage from Härnösand, Sweden to Delfzijl, Groningen, Netherlands.
Sorepta	United Kingdom	The barque sank off Ramsgate.
Starling	United Kingdom	The schooner was wrecked. Her five crew were rescued by the Ramsgate Lifeboat.
State of Alabama	United Kingdom	The steamship ran aground on the Mocha South Sands.
St. Lawrence	United States	The ship was beached at Victoria, British Columbia, Canada. She was on a voyage from San Francisco, California to the Burrard Inlet.
Success	United Kingdom	The fishing boat was wrecked. Her crew were rescued by the Ramsgate Lifeboat.
Sunus	United Kingdom	The steamship ran aground in the Scheldt. She was on a voyage from Middlesbrough, Yorkshire to Antwerp.
Swordfish	United States	The ship was wrecked on the Race Rocks, on the coast of British Columbia. She was on a voyage from San Francisco to the Burrard Inlet.
Thorer Helsing	Norway	The steamship ran aground in Åland, Grand Duchy of Finland. She was on a voyage from Sundsvall to Nörrkoping, Sweden.
Valkyrien	Flag unknown	The brig was driven ashore in Køge Bay. She was refloated and taken in to Copenhagen, Denmark.
Vesta	Norway	The ship was driven ashore at Stavanger.
Vine	United Kingdom	The schooner was wrecked at Barrogill Castle. Her five crew were rescued by the Thurso Lifeboat Charley Lloyd ( Royal National Lifeboat Institution).
Walhave	Sweden	The barque was abandoned at sea before 22 November.
Willy	Flag unknown	The ship was driven ashore at Ronehamn, Sweden. She was on a voyage from Saint Petersburg, Russia to Bergen, Norway.
Wimbledon	United Kingdom	The steamship ran aground at Nieuwesluis, Zeeland, Netherlands.
Woodland	United Kingdom	The ship capsized at Brooklyn, New York, United States.
Zealandia	United Kingdom	The ship was abandoned off New York. Four of her crew were reported missing. She was on a voyage from Quebec City to Greenock.
680	Russia	The lighter was driven ashore at Kronstadt.
Unnamed	United Kingdom	The fishing smack was run down and sunk in the North Sea by the steamship Memento (United Kingdom) with the loss of all hands before 13 November.
Unnamed	Norway	The schooner was abandoned at sea. Her crew were rescued. She was on a voyage from Kalundborg, Denmark to Dunkirk, Nord.
Unnamed	United Kingdom	The schooner was driven ashore and wrecked at the "Festeen Lighthouse".
