= Paisley Celtic F.C. =

Former association football club in Scotland

Paisley Celtic
- Full name: Paisley Celtic F.C.
- Nickname: the Celts
- Founded: 1890
- Dissolved: 1896
- Ground: Celtic Park
- Match Secretary: E. M'Cann
Home colours

Paisley Celtic F.C. was an association football club from Paisley, Renfrewshire, active in the 1890s and a regular entrant to the Scottish Cup.

== History ==
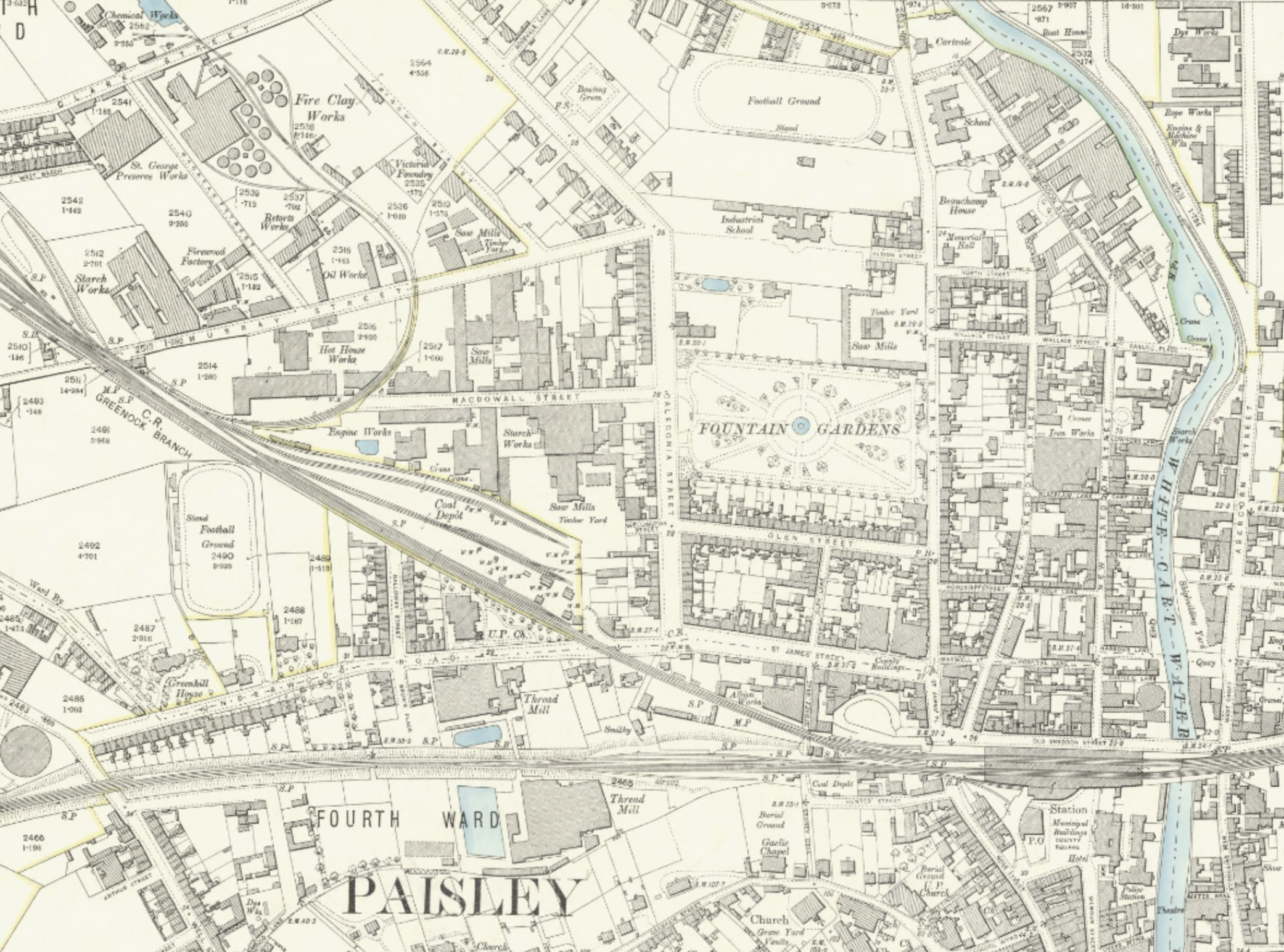
An Ordnance Survey map from 1896, showing the locations of the Celtic Park (left) and Love Street (top) football grounds

The club was founded as a club for Irish diaspora players in the town, the decade after the collapse of Paisley Hibernian. The club was founded as Cartvale in 1890, but was playing as Paisley Celtic from April 1892 at the latest.

The Celts took part in the Scottish Junior Cup for the only time in 1892–93, being disqualified for fielding a professional player (M'Mennemy), and an appeal being dismissed, despite the threat of legal action. Instead of pursuing such action, the club eschewed the junior game at the end of the season and joined the Scottish Football Association.

The club therefore entered the Scottish Cup and Renfrewshire Cup for the first time in 1893–94. In the national competition it beat Dykebar in the first preliminary round, but lost 4–3 at Cambuslang in the second; in a sad aftermath, one Francis Donnelly, who had gone to the match to see his nephew playing for the Celts, died after falling down the stairs outside the house where he mistakenly thought he was meant to be staying. In the county, the Celts beat Paisley Academicals 5–1 in the first round, despite losing Patrick Drain to a broken collarbone, and lost 6–0 at Arthurlie in the second. At the end of the season the Celts were invited to play in the Paisley Charity Cup, and beat the Academicals again, but went down 2–1 at Abercorn in the semi-final.

The club had lost only to Scottish League teams in competitive football in its first senior season, but it could not keep the momentum. Although it beat Kilwinning Eglinton in the first preliminary round of the Scottish Cup in 1894–95, coming from 5–2 down to win 6–5 thanks to the stamina work from trainer Burns and clever play from "Dabber" Welsh, the Academicals gained a revenge in the second. The club's only other competitive fixtures - in the Renfrewshire Cup in 1894–95 and 1895–96, and in the new Scottish Qualifying Cup in 1895–96 - were all defeats. The last sign of the club was its withdrawal from the Qualifying Cup in 1896–97 when drawn against Kilbarchan.

== Colours ==
The club wore green and white vertically striped shirts and blue knickers.

== Ground ==
The club called its ground Celtic Park, and was off Murray Street. The ground suffered in a galestorm in December 1894 when its barricades were blown away.
