= Hiob =

Hiob may refer to:

People with the surname Hiob:

- Hanne Hiob (1923–2009), German actress

People with the given name Hiob:

- Hiob Ludolf (1624–1704), German orientalist

Other:

- Job (novel), a novel by Joseph Roth with the original title Hiob

== See also ==
- Hib (disambiguation)
- Hob (disambiguation)
- Job (disambiguation)
