= 1882–83 Morton F.C. season =

Morton
1882–83 season
- Scottish Cup: Third round (lost to Johnstone)
- Highest home attendance: c. 1,000 v. St Mirren (30 September 1882, Scottish Cup)

The 1882–83 season was Morton Football Club's sixth season in which they competed at a national level, entering the Scottish Cup.

== Fixtures and results ==
Win Draw Loss Postponed

=== Scottish Cup ===
23 September 1882 First Round	Morton	2 – 1	Johnstone Rovers	Cappielow Park
	,		Goal

30 September 1882 Second Round	Morton	5 – 1	St Mirren	Cappielow Park
	Fleming,,,		Goal	Attendance: 1,000

28 October 1882 Third Round	Johnstone	2 – 1	Morton	Newfield Park
	,		Goal

=== Renfrewshire Cup ===
14 October 1882 First Round	Johnstone Rovers	2 – 2	Morton	Newfield Park
	,		,

4 November 1882 First Round Replay	Morton	2 – 2^{[note 1]}	Johnstone Rovers	Cappielow Park
	,		,

2 December 1882 Second Round	Morton	2 – 2	Thornliebank	Cappielow Park
	,		,

9 December 1882 Second Round Replay	Thornliebank	1 – 3 ^{[note 2]}	Morton	Deacon's Bank Park
	Goal		,,

23 December 1882 Second Round Replay	Morton	2 – 1 ^{[note 3]}	Thornliebank	Cappielow Park
	,		Goal

20 January 1883 Second Round Replay	Morton	2 – 2 ^{[note 4]}	Thornliebank	Cappielow Park
	McKinnon		,

10 February 1883 Second Round Replay	Thornliebank	3 – 1	Morton	Cartbank Park, Johnstone
	Barry; Law,		Nugent

1. Both teams qualified.
2. Thornliebank protested that Morton fielded an ineligible player. This was upheld and a replay was ordered.
3. Thornliebank protested about the poor light conditions. This was upheld and another replay was ordered.
4. Morton protested about one of the goals and that full time was called too early. The replay was arranged at a neutral venue.

=== Greenock & District Charity Cup ===
27 January 1883 Semi Final	Morton	6 – 3	Lyle Athletic	Cappielow Park
	,,,,,		,,

17 March 1883 Final	Morton	2 – 2	Greenock Southern	Cappielow Park
	,		,

31 March 1883 Final Replay	Greenock Southern	2 – 2 ^{[note 5]}	Morton	West-end Park
	,		,

5. Southern protested about one of Morton's goals. This was dismissed and a replay was ordered. Southern refused so the cup was awarded to Morton.

=== Friendlies ===
19 August 1882 Friendly	Morton	1 – 3	Partick Thistle	Cappielow Park
	Watts		,,

2 September 1882 Friendly	Kilbarchan	5 – 0	Morton	Whitlands Park
	,,,,

23 September 1882 Friendly	Paisley Athletic	5 – 1	Morton	East Park
	,,,,		Goal

7 October 1882 Friendly	Kilmarnock Portland	5 – 1	Morton	Hamilton Park
	,,,,		Goal

16 December 1882 Friendly	Morton	0 – 0	Port Glasgow Athletic	Cappielow Park

24 February 1883 Friendly	Abercorn	3 – 3	Morton	Blackstoun Park
	,,		,,

10 March 1883 Friendly	Morton	5 – 1	Kilbarchan	Cappielow Park
	,,,,		Goal

28 April 1883 Friendly	Vale of Leven	4 – 0	Morton	Smollett Park
	,,,

5 May 1883 Friendly	Port Glasgow Athletic	5 – 1	Morton	Devol Farm
	,,,,		Goal
