= Olympic F.C. (Scotland) =

Former association football club in Scotland

Olympic
- Full name: Olympic F.C.
- Founded: 1880
- Dissolved: 1886
- Ground: Thistle Park
- President: J. R. Taylor
- Hon. Secretary: John M'Callum M.A., Neil M'Callum
- Secretary: James Gemmell
Home colours

Olympic Football Club, occasionally called Paisley Olympic, was a Scottish football club based in Paisley, Renfrewshire, that existed from 1880 to 1886. Despite being one of the smaller clubs in a town that already had established senior sides in Abercorn, Paisley Athletic, and St Mirren, Olympic achieved notable local success, reaching the semi-finals of the Renfrewshire Cup in consecutive seasons (1883–84 and 1884–85) and the third round of the Scottish Cup on their debut in 1883–84. The club was noted for its tactical innovation, adopting the unique 2–3–5 formation. The club collapsed unexpectedly in August 1886, with its players dispersing to St Mirren and Abercorn, and was effectively replaced by the newly formed Dykebar club.

== History ==
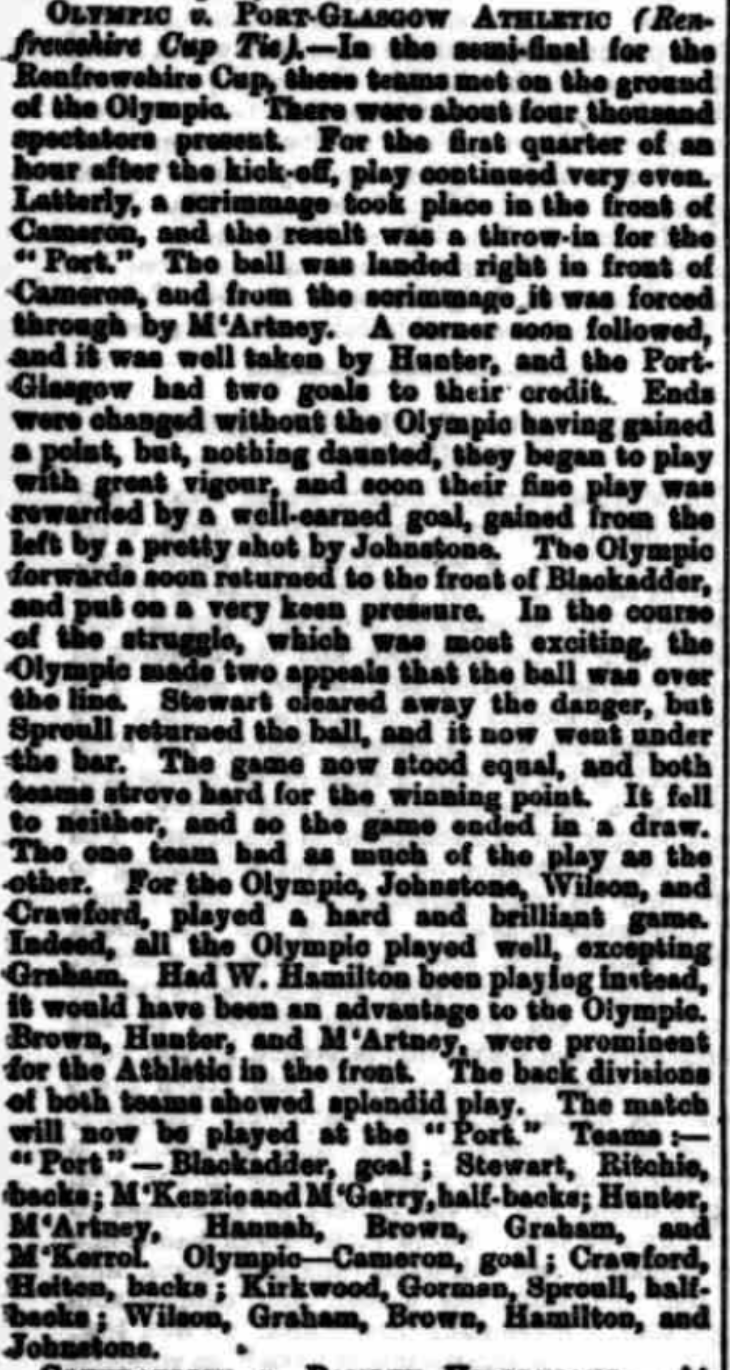
1884–85 Renfrewshire Cup semi-final, Olympic 2–2 Port Glasgow Athletic, Paisley & Renfrewshire Gazette, 21 February 1885

The club was founded in 1880, holding its first meeting in October. It first played competitive football in 1882–83, losing in a replay to Pollok in the first round of the Renfrewshire Cup, and joined the Scottish Football Association in 1883, by which time the town already had senior clubs in the shape of Abercorn, Paisley Athletic, and St Mirren.

By 1884, the Olympic could boast of 70 members, less than half the size of the Athletic, a third of the size of Abercorn, and less than a quarter of the size of the Saints. It was however comparatively successful on a local level, reaching the semi-final of the Renfrewshire Cup in 1883–84 and 1884–85. In the latter year, the club surprised Abercorn with a 2–1 win in a quarter-final replay, the Abbies protesting in vain about crowd encroachment; in the semi-final, Olympic drew 2–2 with Port Glasgow Athletic, but lost 5–0 in the replay in a game which was tighter than the score suggested, Olympic not taking any of numerous chances in the first half, and still being in the game at 2–0 when reduced to 10 men through injury. The club's success, despite its size, was attributed to a tactical shift, having adopted the 2–3–5 system with Spruill at centre-midfield, instead of the 2–2–6 used by its opponents.

Olympic first entered the Scottish Cup in 1883–84, reaching the third round on its debut, with wins at Yoker and Clippens. The run came to an end with a 5–0 home defeat to Ayrshire side Mauchline. The club was unlucky in its second entry in 1884–85, being drawn away at the much bigger Arthurlie, but only lost 2–0, and suffered from "some very hard lines".

The club's end seems to have come out of the blue. As late as June 1885 it was beating Abercorn in a friendly and was drawn to play at Arthurlie in the first round of the 1885–86 Scottish Cup. However the club "collapsed" at the end of August, its players finding berths with St Mirren and (in the case of Gorman and Heiton) Abercorn. The club was effectively replaced by the Dykebar club, which played its first match at Thistle Park in October 1885, and who took on centre-midfielder Robert Spruill from the Olympic.

== Colours ==
The club's colours were ½" crimson and white hooped jerseys and hose, and blue knickers.

== Ground ==
The club played at Thistle Park, Greenhill, Paisley, a 5-minute walk from the railway station. The ground was the ground of the Paisley Thistle cricket club, and formerly the ground of St Mirren.
