= HIBS =

HIBS or Hibs may refer to:

== Sports clubs known as Hibs ==
=== In Scotland ===
- Hibernian F.C., a football club based in Edinburgh
- Hibernian W.F.C., a women's football team based in Edinburgh
- Thornton Hibs F.C., a football club based in Thornton, Fife
- Smithstone Hibs F.C., a former football club based in Kilsyth
- Denny Hibernian F.C., a former Junior football club based in Denny, Falfirk
- Vale of Leven Hibernians F.C., a former football club based in Alexandria, Vale of Leven, Dunbartonshire,
- Campsie Hibernians F.C., a former football club based in Lennoxtown, Stirlingshire
- Carfin Hibernians F.C., a former football club based in Carfin, North Lanarkshire
- Paisley Hibernians F.C., a former football club based in Paisley, Renfrewshire
- Campuslang Hibernian F.C., a former football club based in Cambuslang, Scotland
- Harp F.C., a former football club based in Dundee, founded as Hibernian Football Club
- Duntocher Hibernian F.C., a former Junior football club based in Duntocher, West Dunbartonshire
- Maryhill Harp F.C., a former Junior football club based in Maryhill, Glasgow, founded as Maryhill Hibernians

=== In Malta ===
- Hibernians F.C., a football club based in Paola
- Hibernians Basketball Club, a sports club based in Paola
- Hibernians Futsal Club, a former futsal team based in Paola

=== In Ireland ===
- Cork Hibernians F.C., a former football club based in Cork
- Bangor Hibs Football Club, a football club based in Bangor Erris, County Mayo

=== In the United States ===
- Hibernian Saints, a former soccer team based in Seattle, Washington

== Schools ==
- Hutt International Boys' School (HIBS), a secondary school in Upper Hutt, New Zealand
- Highlands International Boarding School (HIBS), a school in Pahang, Malaysia
- Horizon International Bilingual School (HIBS), a private high school in Ho Chi Minh City, Vietnam

== Other uses ==
- Members of the Ancient Order of Hibernians
- Hibs Casuals, Scottish football hooligan firm

== See also ==
- Hib (disambiguation)
