= Dykebar F.C. =

Dykebar
- Full name: Dykebar F.C.
- Nickname: Wee Dykies
- Founded: 1879
- Dissolved: 1895
- Ground: Thistle Park
- Capacity: 5,000
- Hon. President: Andrew Thompson Esq.
- Hon. Secretary: Robert Beith
- Match Secretary: William Paul
1879–88 colours	1888–95 colours

Dykebar Football Club was a Scottish football team located in the town of Paisley, Renfrewshire.

== History ==
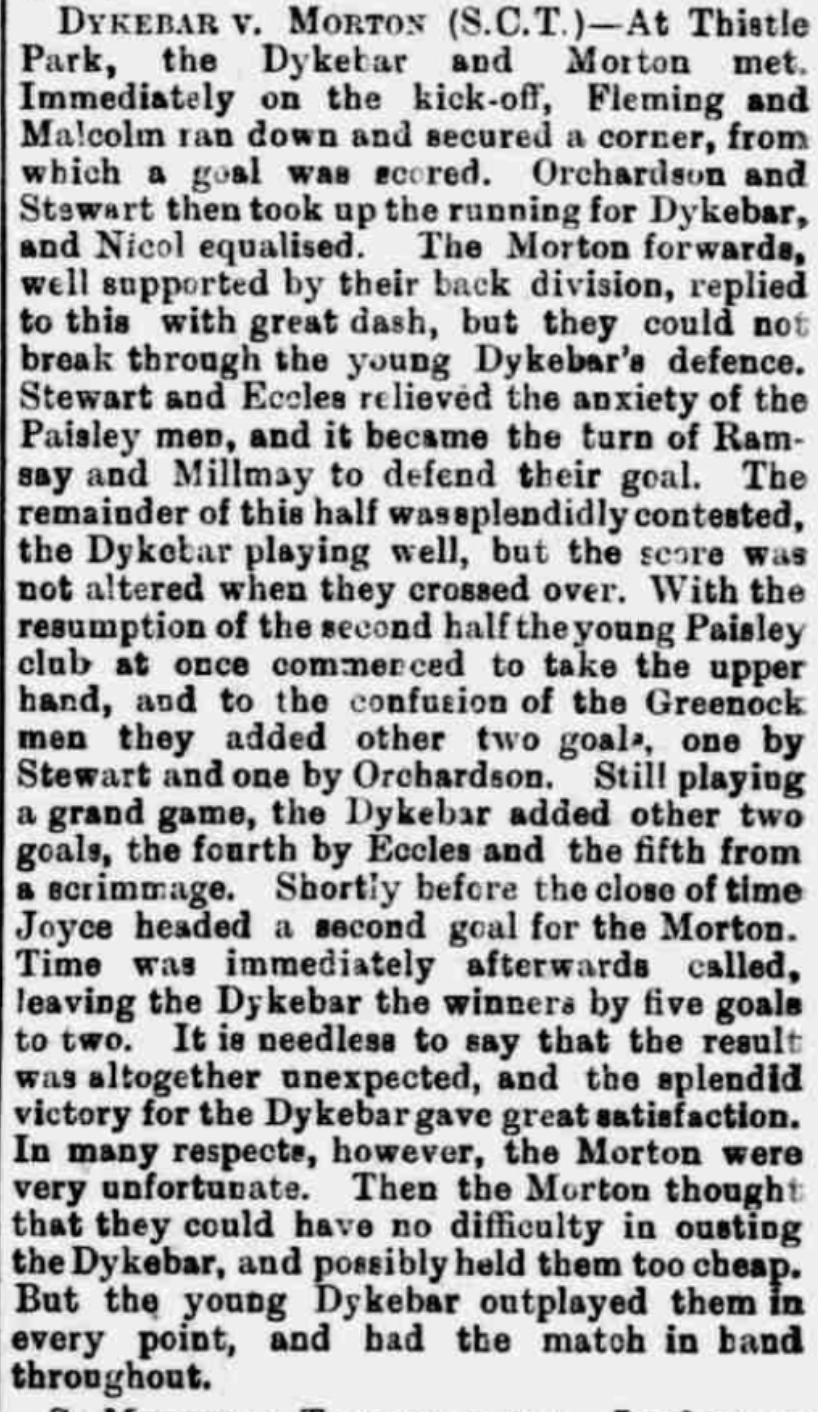
1887–88 Scottish Cup First Round, Dykebar 5–2 Morton, Paisley Daily Express, 5 September 1887

The club was founded in 1879, albeit in its early years it did not play competitive football, and did not even host a "conversazione" - the usual annual celebration of a club - until January 1886. Its first competitive football came in the Renfrewshire Cup in 1885–86, and its first match something of a false start; the club lost to Paisley Hibernians but the Hibernians had not registered a single one of the starting XI with the Renfrewshire FA, so Dykebar was put through to the second round; Hibernian secretary James Gildea accepted the blame, on the basis that, having registered the players with the Scottish Football Association, he had not thought it necessary to do so again with the county association. In the second round the club beat Northern (Greenock) 4–1, coming from behind, and lost 7–0 to Abercorn in the quarter-final in front of a "meagre" crowd.

Dykebar joined the Scottish Football Association in 1887, at the same time as the re-formed Paisley Athletic. This helped in taking advantage of the gradual consolidation of clubs in the town; on the demise of the Olympic club, the Wee Dykies took on Robert Spruill, one of the first centre-midfielders in the game and who later became the club president.

Dykebar's first Scottish Cup tie in 1887–88 was against Morton, and the Wee Dykies went nap, winning 5–2 in a result described as "the surprise of the round". Another 5–2 win at Lochwinnoch put the club into the third round for the only time; the home side protested to no avail about the "huroo" squad of fans which accompanied the team. In the third round Dykebar took Kilmarnock to a replay before losing.

The club's best run in the county cup came in 1889–90, when it reached the semi-final, and only lost to Port Glasgow Athletic in a second replay. The club repeated the feat in 1892–93, but by this time most of the clubs in the shire had dissolved, and the club only needed one match to get so far; this time the club lost 6–3 to Morton at home in the semi.

Dykebar did reach two competition final, that of the Paisley Charity Cup in 1889–90 and 1890–91; the competition was generally a four-team invitational. In 1888–89 the club walked over town rivals St Mirren in the semi-final but lost to Abercorn in the final. In 1890–91, the Wee Dykies went into the final on the back of a "splendid" win over Arthurlie in the semi-final and triumphing in a four-a-side tournament against Abercorn, St Mirren, and Port Glasgow Athletic. However the club was outclassed by the Saints in the final; St Mirren was now definitively the top side in Paisley and would never relinquish that distinction.

The rise of professionalism (Dykebar's "modus operandi" was "strict amateurism") and loss of fixtures, combined with the cost of renting a cricket ground, meant the club ran out of money during the 1894 season. The club held a concert in December 1894, in order to raise enough money "for the purpose of defraying whatever debt remained against the name of Dykebar F.C."; at least in this the concert was successful. The club was struck off the Scottish FA roll before the next season.

== Colours ==
The club's colours were originally black and white vertical stripes and blue knickers. In 1888 the club changed its jerseys to white.

== Ground ==
The club originally played at Greenhill. From October 1885, the club played at Thistle Park, the ground of the Paisley Thistle cricket club, and formerly the ground of St Mirren and (the previous season) the now-defunct Olympic; facilities were spartan, without even a table for reporters. The biggest known attendance was "fully 5,000", with the ground "taxed to the utmost", for the 1888–89 Scottish Cup second round derby with St Mirren.

== Notable players ==
- William Paul, the club's match secretary for its entire senior existence, and also the club's only international player, earning a cap in the 1891 international against Ireland.
