= Hibernian Magazine =

Hibernian Magazine may refer to the following periodicals:

- Walker's Hibernian Magazine (1771–1812; called The Hibernian Magazine until 1786)
- Duffy's Hibernian Magazine (1864–1866)
- The Hibernia Magazine (1937–1980)
- The Hibernian (2006–2008)

== See also ==
- Hibernian (disambiguation)
