= Hibernia 41-E =

Coordinates: 51.49258°N 7.233167°E

Hibernia AG 41-E and 42-E
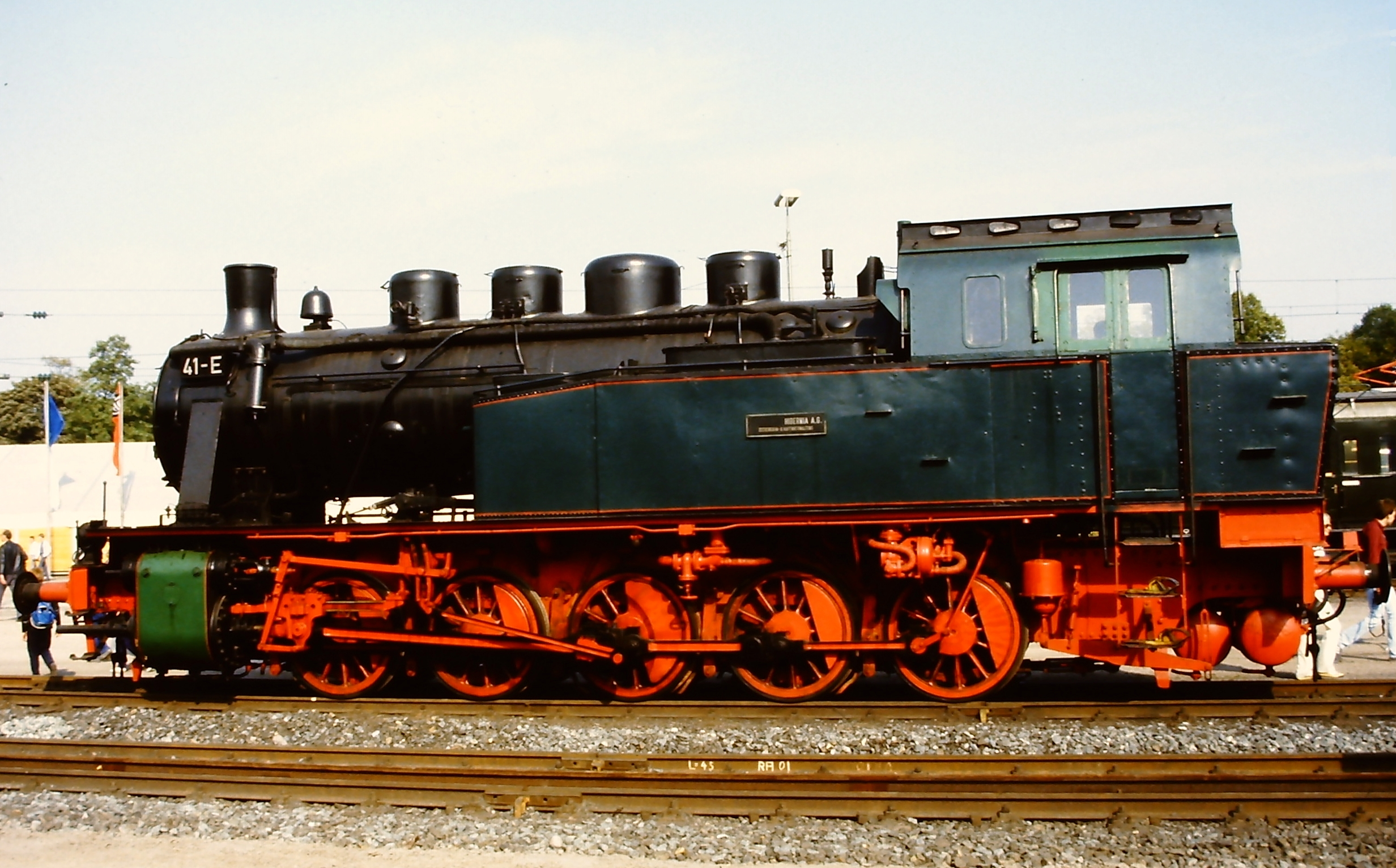
- 41-E
Type and origin
- Power type: Steam
- Builder: Henschel & Sohn, Kassel
- Build date: 1942
- Total produced: 2
Specifications
- Configuration
  - Whyte: 0-10-0T
  - UIC: E h2t
- Gauge: 1,435 mm (4 ft 8 1/2 in)
- Driver dia.: 1,200 mm (47.24 in)
- Length: 12.770 m (41 ft 11 in) over buffers
- Fuel type: Coal
- Fuel capacity: 2.7 tonnes (6,000 lb)
- Water cap.: 9,000 litres (2,000 imp gal; 2,400 US gal)
- Cylinders: Two
- Cylinder size: 600 mm × 600 mm (23.62 in × 23.62 in)
Performance figures
- Maximum speed: 45 km/h (28 mph)
- Power output: 625 kW (850 PS)
Career
- Operators: Hibernia AG
- Numbers: 30–31; later renumbered 41-E and 42-E
- Withdrawn: 1971
- Disposition: E-41 preserved, E-42 scrapped

Hibernia 41-E and 42-E were steam locomotives of Hibernia AG. Locomotive No 42-E was scrapped, but No 41-E does still exist and was temporarily displayed in front of the Starlight Express Theater in Bochum.

== History ==
The coal mining company Hibernia AG bought 1942 during World War II two five-coupled and one four-coupled locomotives from Henschel & Son in Kassel for use around the mine. The locomotives were used above ground on the rail network of the former Bergwerks-AG Recklinghausen which was later called Bergbau AG Herne/Recklinghausen until 1970 and 1971, respectively. Hibernia 41-E was finally used in the coal mine Bergwerk General Blumenthal in Recklinghausen and then sold to Bochum Dahlhausen Railway Museum.

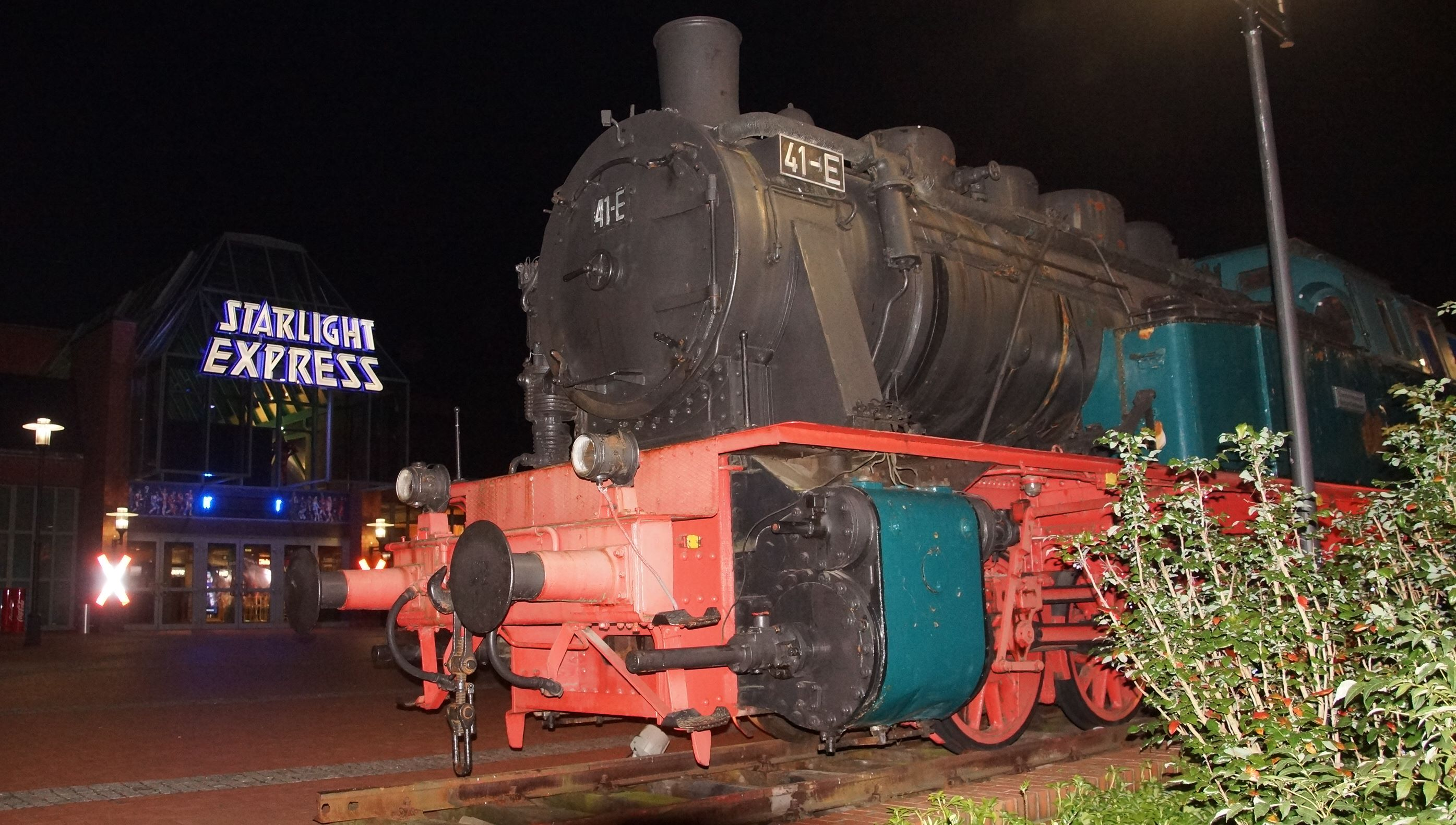
Hibernia 41-E while being displayed at the Starlight Express Theatre in Bochum

At the premiere of the musical Starlight Express in 1988 in Bochum, the locomotive was displayed for a short time as an eye catcher in front of the new built theatre but then returned to the museum. For the 5000th show the locomotive was again lent to the Starlight Express Theatre to stay there with an old coach for three years. However, the locomotive has not been transported back and is still displayed in front of the theater.

== Technology ==
It is a standard gauge superheated steam tank locomotive with 5 coupled axles, which is similar to the Henschel-Type E800 but with some notable exceptions. Therefore, it is called Henschel-Type Bochum. During World War II the firebox could not be made from copper, and steel was used instead. In 1956 it was modified by installing roller bearings and a mixing pre-heater by Henschel. The steam operated brake was replaced by a pneumatic brake with compressed air.
