= Betts Cove =

Settlement in Newfoundland and Labrador

Coordinates: 49.818°N 55.784°W

Location of Betts Cove in Newfoundland and Labrador

Betts Cove is a settlement in Newfoundland and Labrador.

Betts Cove is now deserted. It was once a mining center with a peak population of 2000. It had a hospital, school and three churches. Around the 1870s copper ore was mined, crushed and partially smelted. The ore was then transported by tram railways over the cliffs to boats. The ore was shipped to Swansea in Wales for final smelting. By 1884 the ore began to run out and people left. No buildings remain.
