= Hibernia, Nova Scotia =

Community in Nova Scotia, Canada

Coordinates: 44°19′58.12″N 64°58′59.01″W

Hibernia in Nova Scotia

Hibernia is a community in the Canadian province of Nova Scotia, located in the Region of Queens Municipality.
