= Hibernia, Ohio =

Coordinates: 39°57′08″N 82°50′58″W

Hibernia was a village located just outside modern-day Reynoldsburg, Ohio. Today, there is a large apartment complex on the land that still bears the name "Hibernia." The apartments occupy the southeast corner of East Main Street and Noe-Bixby Road, just inside the I-270 corridor, on the east side of Columbus.

== History ==
Around 1840, a couple years after the National Road was established in Ohio, property owner Thomas Armstrong "disposed of" a few lots along the road, and four or five families built homes there. The grouping eventually got its own post office on August 25, 1849, and began to be referred to by name. Although the post office closed in January 1857, the town lingered in some form. Hibernia was a listed stop on the National Road until around 1900, and as recently as the 1940s, Columbus bus lines on Route 40 East had a stop in Hibernia before arriving in Reynoldsburg.

=== Carlisle garden ===
Located within the modern-day apartment complex is a cemetery known as Carlisle Garden. The occupants of Carlisle Garden are believed to be the residents of the old village. The oldest stone dates from 1810, and the most recent from 1877. A number of veterans from the War of 1812 and the Civil War are buried there also. The staff of the apartment complex still maintain the plots.
