= Hibernian Catholic Benefit Society =

The Hibernian Catholic Benefit Society is a friendly society in New Zealand, with a former associated credit union. It was created in 1869.

After a large case of fraud occurring over several years through the early 2000s, in which an employee stole an estimated $1.24 million in society money, the associated credit union had to be wound up, and the society had to default on a large amount of the moneys held for its depositors. However, the society noted that it would continue to exist and strive to fulfill its aims.
