= Hib (disambiguation) =

Hib or HIB may refer to:

- Hib Milks (1899–1949), a Canadian Professional Hockey forward
- Hib Sabin (born 1935), American sculptor and educator
- Haemophilus influenzae serotype b, and the corresponding Hib vaccine
- Chisholm-Hibbing Airport in Hibbing, Minnesota (IATA Code: HIB)
- Bergen University College, (Norwegian: Høgskolen i Bergen or HiB)
- The acronym standing for harassment, intimidation, and bullying in an educational setting
- The mineral symbol for hibbingite
- The shortened name of Collectio canonum Hibernensis, a Latin collection of Continental canon law
- Havin International Bank (HIB), the former name for Havin Bank Ltd., a British bank

== See also ==
- HIBS (disambiguation)
