= Paisley Hibernian F.C. =

Former association football club in Scotland

Paisley Hibernian
- Full name: Paisley Hibernian F.C.
- Nickname: the Hibs
- Founded: 1884
- Dissolved: 1886
- Ground: Caledonia Park
- Hon. Secretary: Charles C. Ward
- Match Secretary: James A. Gildea
1884–85 colours	1885–86 colours

Paisley Hibernian Football Club was an association football club from Paisley, Renfrewshire, active briefly in the 1880s. The media often referred to the club as Paisley Hibernians.

== History ==
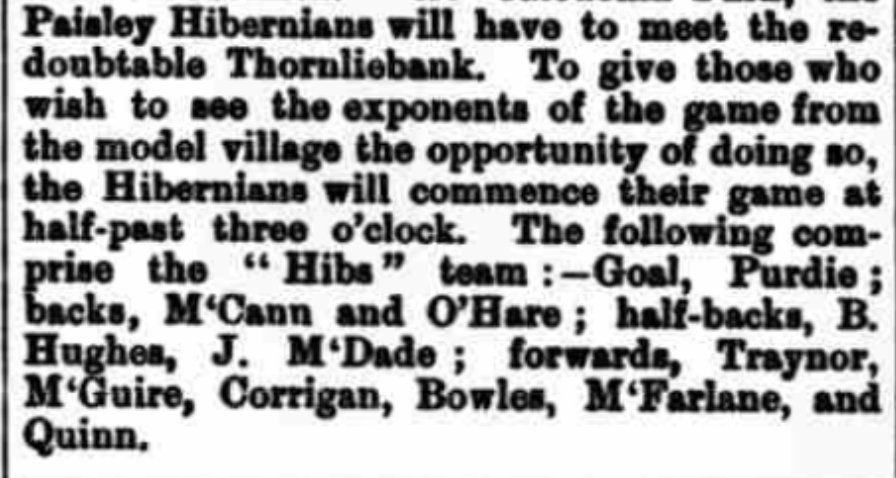
Paisley Hibernian side to face Thornliebank in the 1885–86 Scottish Cup, Paisley & Renfrewshire Gazette, 12 September 1885

Although the club claimed a foundation date of 1880, and there is a reference to a club of that name being founded in that year, there is no record of a Paisley Hibernian club playing until a second foundation on 16 October 1884, at a meeting at the League of the Cross rooms in Causeyside. Its first recorded match was a 4–1 home defeat to Springburn Hibernian at the end of the year.

The club joined the Scottish Football Association in August 1885 and entered the 1885–86 Scottish Cup. The club had a tough draw, being paired with Thornliebank, but nearly achieved a shock result, holding the Model Villagers to a 2–2 draw at Caledonia Park. In the replay, despite being without full-back M'Cann and forward M'Farlane, the Hibernians were five minutes short of pulling off a goalless draw, which would have meant both teams progressing to the second round, but the heavier Thornliebank side forced the Hibernians' backs and goalkeeper through the posts in a scrimmage, and added a second on the whistle.

However, disaster struck in the club's first Renfrewshire Cup tie. The Hibs had apparently beaten Dykebar 4–1, but the Wee Dykies protested, on the basis that not one of the Hibernian players had been registered. Club secretary James Gildea explained that he had registered the players with the Scottish FA, assuming that that covered registration with the Renfrewshire Association as well, and suggested a replay. The Dykebar protest was upheld, but, on the casting vote of the chairman (from Port Glasgow Athletic), the tie was awarded to Dykebar. Gildea therefore "amid much amusement, solemnly and with much dignity, intimated the withdrawal of his club from the association".

The incident seems to have more or less finished the club; it barely played afterwards, and was struck from the Scottish FA roll in August 1886 and the Renfrewshire FA roll in September 1886 for non-payment of subscriptions. The club's demise came as an unwelcome surprise to landlord Speirs Gibb & Company, which successfully sued the club members for the £16 rent for the period of April 1885 to March 1886, which had not been paid.

== Colours ==
At the initial meeting, the club agreed colours of green and black "striped" jerseys (the term at the time referring to hoops), and white knickers with a green stripe. Perhaps due to the difficulties in commissioning such a baroque outfit, as a senior club the Hibernian wore green jerseys and white knickers.

== Ground ==
The club's first ground was Westmarch, with the permission of St Mirren, who also played there. For its second and last season it played at Caledonia Park, off Caledonia Street, 10 minutes' walk from the railway station, also the home of Paisley Athletic. The club opened the ground with a prestige friendly against the second XI of its spiritual parent Hibernian, the Paisley Hibs playing a "capital" game and being unlucky only to draw 3–3.
