= SS Hibernia (1861) =

History

United Kingdom
- Name: Hibernia
- Owner: Atlantic Royal Mail Steamship Navigation Company (1861-1872); Telegraph Construction and Maintenance Company (1872-1877)
- Builder: Palmer Brothers & Co., Jarrow
- Yard number: 82
- Launched: 1861
- Fate: Sank, 21 November 1877

General characteristics
- Tonnage: 3,008 GRT; 1,569 NRT
- Length: 360 ft (110 m)
- Beam: 40 ft (12 m)
- Depth of hold: 29 ft 1 in (8.86 m)
- Propulsion: 320 shp (239 kW) steam engine

SS Hibernia was a steamship built in the shipyards Palmer Brothers & Company of Jarrow, County Durham, England, in 1861. The ship was made of iron, including three decks and six bulkheads. She was 360 feet (110 m) long and 40 feet (12 m) wide with a hold depth of 29 feet 1 inch (8.86 m). She was 2,164 net tonnes with a thrust of 320 horsepower (240 kW).

== Ship history ==
Originally owned by the Atlantic Royal Mail Steamship Navigation Company of London it carried mail and passengers and was engaged in many other parts of the world in cable laying work. In 1872 ownership was passed over to the Telegraph Construction and Maintenance Company of London. In 1873 Hibernia was also under contract to repair the French Atlantic Cable, that stretched from Brest to Saint-Pierre and Miquelon with Wilson Robert Cato as Master at Sheerness.

Hibernia assisted Great Eastern in her laying telegraph cables from Heart's Content, Newfoundland to Valentia, County Kerry, Ireland in 1873 and 1874. This cable was originally ordered by the French Atlantic Telegraph Company just before its takeover by the Anglo-American Telegraph Company. After completion, because of the shorter route, 1,000 nautical miles (1,900 km) of cable was left and so additional cable was ordered to enable another cable to be laid, this being done in 1874. Hibernia's task was the laying the short ends of the cables that came ashore.

After completion of the cable laying at Heart's Content Hibernia was sent to Brazil to replace broken cables between Pará, Maranhão and Pernambuco. On 21 November 1877, Hibernia sank while anchored off Ponta d'Areia, near São Luís, Maranhão. All crew members were rescued and a few miles of cable were recovered.
