= HMS Hibernia =

Four ships and one shore establishment of the Royal Navy have borne the name HMS Hibernia after the Latin name of Ireland:

- HMS Hibernia was to have been a 74-gun third rate. She was renamed HMS Prince of Wales in 1763 and launched in 1765.
- HMS Hibernia (1804) was a 110-gun first rate launched in 1804. She became the base flagship at Malta in 1855, and was broken up in 1902.
- HMS Hibernia was a base ship, launched in 1863 as the ironclad frigate HMS Achilles. She became a base ship under the name HMS Hibernia in 1902, was renamed HMS Egmont in 1904, HMS Egremont in 1916 and HMS Pembroke in 1919, before being sold for scrapping in 1923.
- HMS Hibernia (1905) was a King Edward VII-class pre-dreadnought battleship launched in 1905 and sold in 1921.
- HMS Hibernia (shore establishment) is the Northern Irish base of the Royal Naval Reserve, commissioning in Lisburn in 2010.
