= TSS Hibernia (1920) =

History
- Name: 1920–1948: TSS Hibernia; 1948: TSS Hibernia II
- Owner: 1920–1923: London and North Western Railway; 1923–1948: London, Midland and Scottish Railway; 1948: British Transport Commission
- Operator: 1920–1923: London and North Western Railway; 1923–1948: London, Midland and Scottish Railway; 1948: British Transport Commission
- Port of registry: (United Kingdom)
- Route: 1920–1948: Holyhead - Dún Laoghaire
- Builder: William Denny and Brothers, Dumbarton
- Yard number: 1035
- Launched: 9 March 1920
- Out of service: 1948
- Fate: Scrapped 1948

General characteristics
- Tonnage: 3,467 gross register tons (GRT)
- Length: 380.6 ft (116.0 m)
- Beam: 45.2 ft (13.8 m)

TSS Hibernia was a twin screw steamer passenger vessel operated by the London and North Western Railway from 1920 to 1923, and the London, Midland and Scottish Railway from 1923 to 1948.

== History ==
She was built by William Denny and Brothers of Dumbarton and launched in 1920.

In 1948, she was renamed TSS Hibernia II in preparation for a new vessel of the same name, the MV Hibernia (1948). Only a few months later she was scrapped by the British Transport Commission.
