= MV Hibernia =

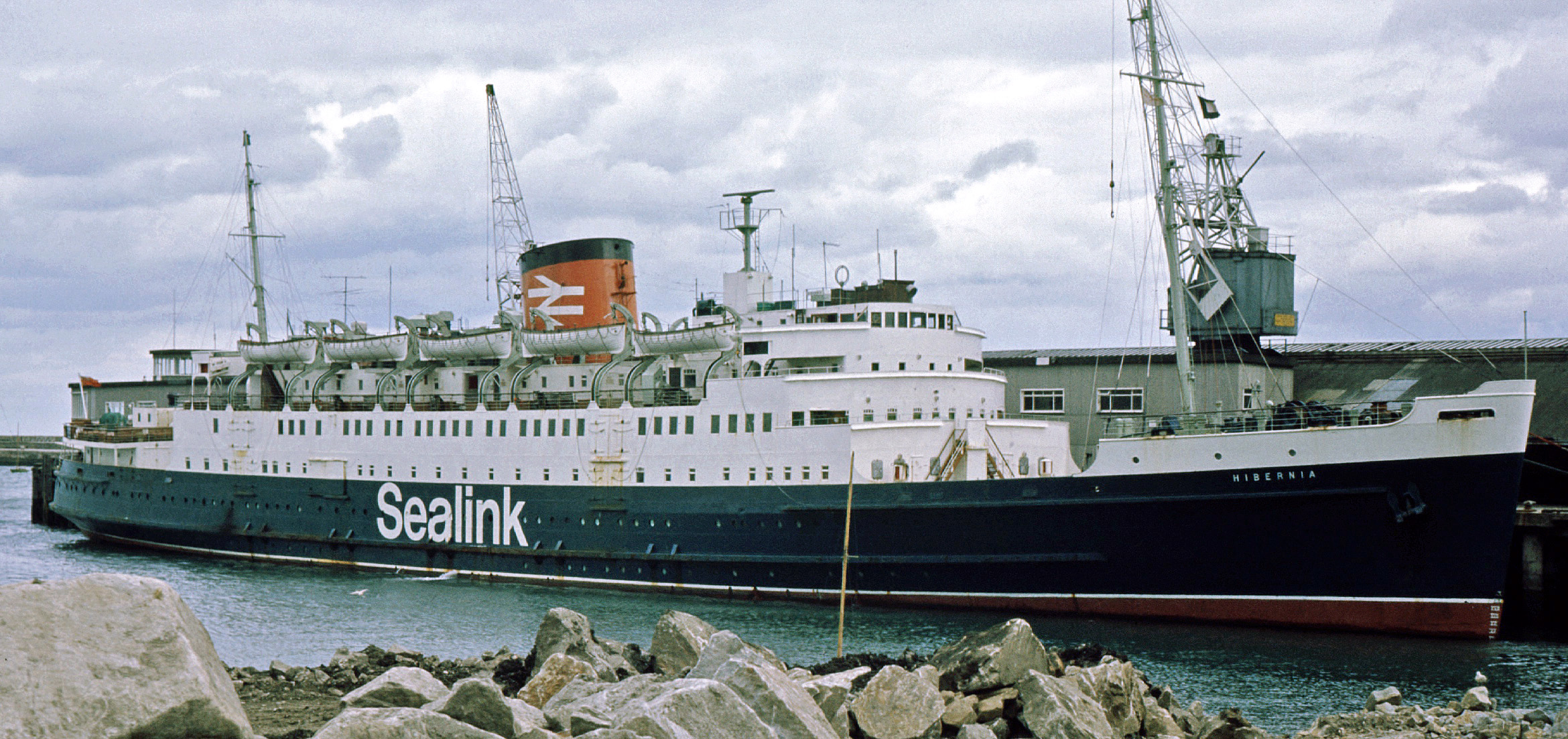
- Hibernia at Dun Laoghaire, May 1974

History
- Name: 1949–1976: Hibernia; 1976–1980: Express Apollon
- Owner: 1949–1968: British Transport Commission; 1962–1976: British Rail
- Operator: 1949–1968: British Transport Commission; 1962–1976: British Rail; 1976–1980: Agapitos lines
- Port of registry: 1949–1968: London, United Kingdom; 1976–1981: Piraeus, Greece
- Route: 1949–1976: Holyhead – Dún Laoghaire
- Builder: Harland & Wolff, Belfast
- Yard number: 1367
- Launched: 27 April 1948
- Completed: 1949
- Maiden voyage: 14 April 1949
- In service: 1949
- Out of service: 1976
- Identification: IMO number: 5150111
- Fate: Scrapped in India, 1980

General characteristics
- Tonnage: 4,972 gross register tons (GRT)
- Length: 379.5 ft (115.7 m)
- Beam: 54.2 ft (16.5 m)
- Draught: 28 ft (8.5 m)

MV Hibernia was a twin screw motor vessel operated by the British Transport Commission from 1948 to 1962 and British Rail from 1962 to 1976. Together with her sister ship the MV Cambria she served the Holyhead to Dún Laoghaire route across the Irish Sea.

== History ==
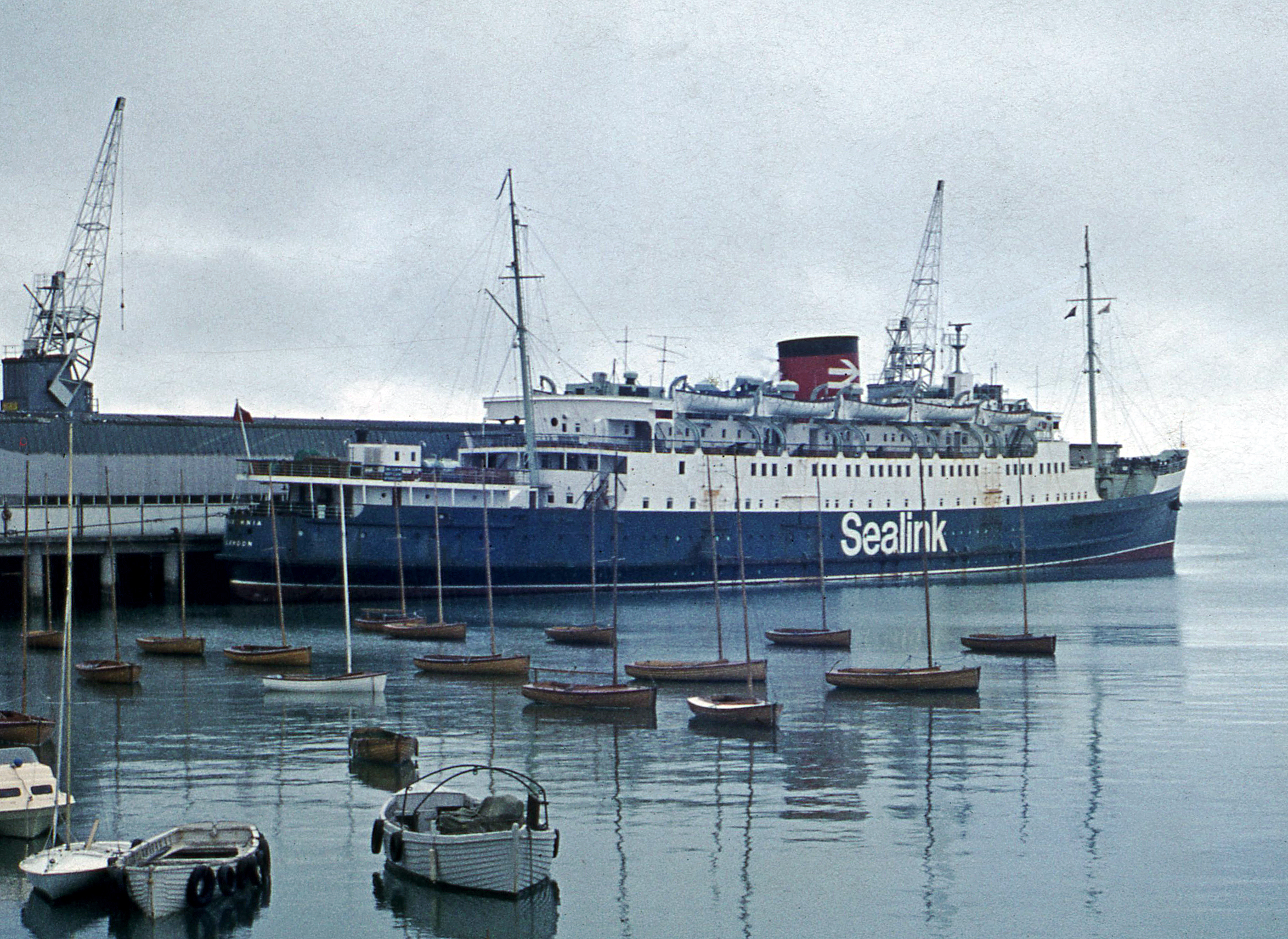
Hibernia at Carlisle Pier, Dun Laoghaire, 1973

She was built by Harland & Wolff of Belfast, launched on 27 April 1948 for the British Transport Commission and started service in 1949. She replaced a 1920 vessel of the same name, the twin screw steamer Hibernia.

In 1951 she was fitted with Denny-Brown stabilisers. In 1964–65 they were refurbished with airline style seating. Some cabins and staterooms were removed and replaced with second-class lounges, and a cafeteria. The screened areas were extended to provide further covered seating, and the first and second class smokerooms were converted into a tea lounge.

She was sold in 1976 to the Agapitos Brothers in Greece and became the Express Apollon but never traded in Greece. She remained laid-up at Salamina, and was sold to Indian breakers in 1980. She arrived in Darukhana, India in 1980 for scrapping by Ankom Solid Steel Traders, and had been demolished by 1981.
