= Paisley Athletic F.C. =

Paisley Athletic
- Full name: Paisley Athletic F.C.
- Nickname(s): the Zulus
- Founded: 1879
- Dissolved: 1888
- Ground: East Park
- Hon. Secretary: Angus Shaw
- Match Secretary: John H. Sellers, Thomas Hastie
1879–82 colours	1883–88 colours

Paisley Athletic Football Club was a Scottish football team located in the town of Paisley, Renfrewshire.

== History ==
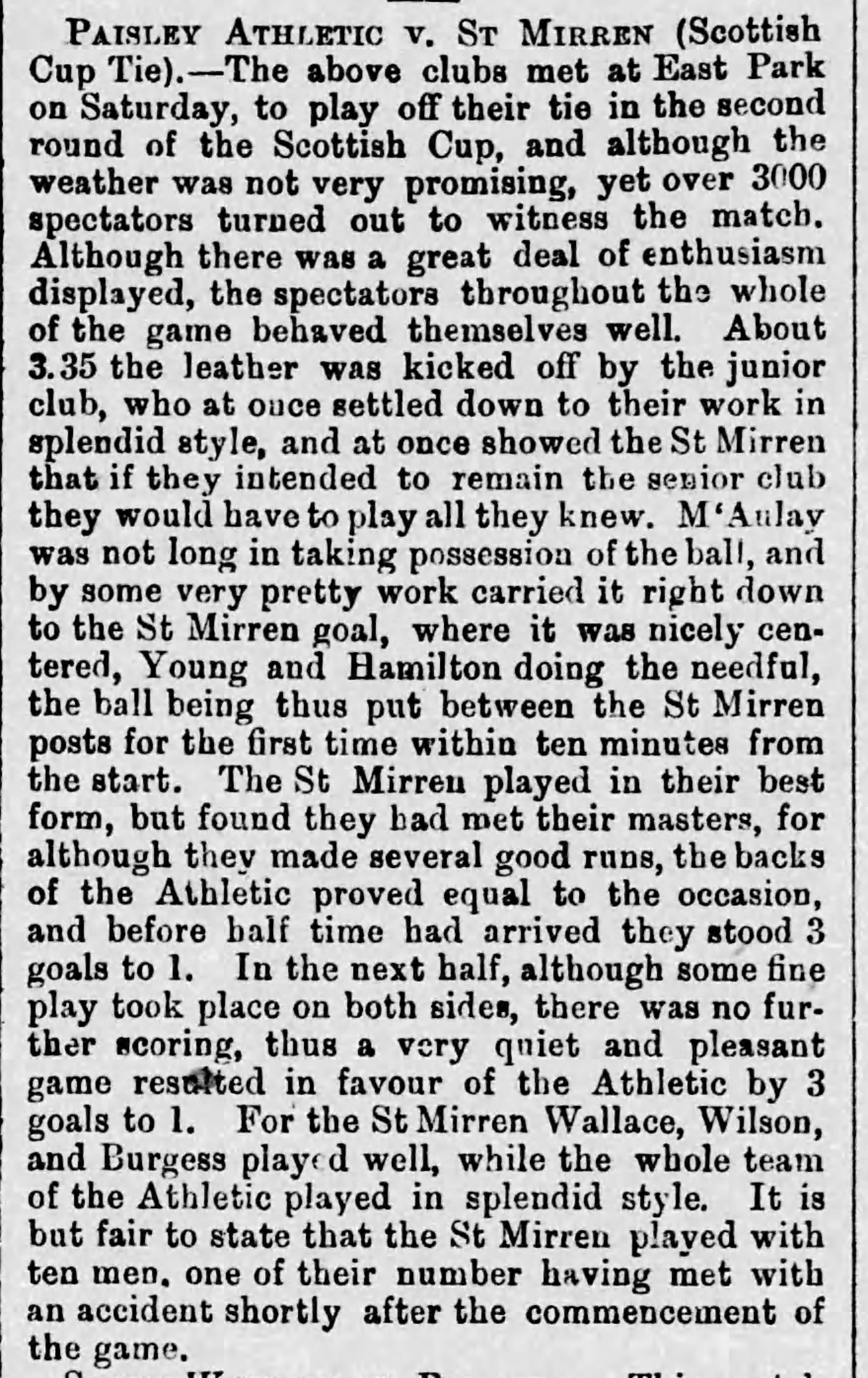
1881–82 Scottish Cup First Round, Paisley Athletic 3–1 St Mirren, Paisley Daily Express 10 October 1881

The club was founded in 1879. It was the third senior club in Paisley to be founded, after St Mirren and Abercorn.

The club quickly grew to be a significant size, and in its early years was competitive with the more senior clubs in the town. The club's first entry into the Scottish Cup, in 1881–82, saw it take notable scalps in Port Glasgow Athletic and St Mirren; its 6–1 win over Port Glasgow being particularly noteworthy as the club played the second half with ten men. The club's run ended at Arthurlie in the third round; after taking the lead, and turning around at 1–1 at half-time, the Athletic collapsed in the second half against the more experienced club, Arthurlie scoring three in the first five minutes of the second half, and the match ending 7–1.

In 1882–83, the club won the first Paisley Charity Cup, hammering St Mirren 6–0 in the final, and was described as "the premier club in Paisley". However, by 1883–84, St Mirren and Abercorn had 200 members each, with Athletic lagging behind with 160. After its first Scottish Cup run it was permanently in the shadow of the other Paisley sides; it only won one more Scottish Cup tie (against Kilbarchan in 1883–84 - Kilbarchan's protest as to the incompetence of the referee was summarily dismissed), and never got beyond the third round of the Renfrewshire Cup. After the 1884–85 season it did not renew its Scottish Football Association subscription.

The club was re-formed in October 1886, under the presidency of Mr Whitehill, and Thomas Hastie becoming match secretary (a post he had held from 1882) once more. The Athletic re-joined the Renfrewshire Association after the start of the season, so starting its Renfrewshire Cup campaign in the second round. The game however had moved on far beyond the Athletic - Port Glasgow Athletic beat the club 9–1 at Caledonian Park, and in 1887–88 the Athletic scratched from both national and county cup before playing its ties; it played a friendly against Port Glasgow rather than its Renfrewshire Cup tie, and lost 10–0. By 1888 the club only had 60 members and its inability to get up a team for its 1888–89 Scottish Cup first round tie with Thornliebank meant automatic expulsion from the Scottish Football Association for a second consecutive default.

== Colours ==
The club's colours were as follows:

- 1879–82: 2" black and gold hooped jerseys and stockings, with blue (serge) knickers
- 1882–83: black jerseys with a gold star on the chest, and white knickers.
- 1883–88: white jerseys, blue knickers

== Ground ==
The club's first ground was East Park, close to Paisley railway station. In 1883 it moved to Caledonia Park, near to Paisley St James railway station. The ground was on Mackean Street and became the home of the Junior side Westmarch XI from 1894 to 1897.

== Notable players ==
- Robert Calderwood, forward, played for the club in the 1882–83 season
- Jock Cameron, goalkeeper, played for the Athletic until 1885
