= Masonic conspiracy theories =

Conspiracy theories involving Freemasonry

Hundreds of conspiracy theories about Freemasonry have been described since the late 18th century. Usually, these theories fall into three distinct categories: political (usually involving allegations of control of government, particularly in the United States and the United Kingdom), religious (usually involving allegations of anti-Christian or Satanic beliefs or practices), and cultural (usually involving popular entertainment). Many conspiracy theories have connected the Freemasons (and the Knights Templar) with worship of the devil; these ideas are based on different interpretations of the doctrines of those organizations.

Of the claims that Freemasonry exerts control over politics, perhaps the best-known example is the New World Order theory, but there are others. These mainly involve aspects and agencies of the United States government, but actual events outside the US (such as the Propaganda Due scandal in Italy) are often used to lend credence to claims.

Another set of theories has to do with Freemasonry and religion, particularly that Freemasonry deals with "the occult". These theories have their beginnings in the Taxil hoax. In addition to these, there are various theories that focus on the embedding of symbols in otherwise ordinary items, such as street patterns, national seals, corporate logos, etc.

There are Masonic conspiracy theories dealing with every aspect of society. The majority of these theories are based on one or more of the following assumptions:

- That Freemasonry is its own religion, requires belief in a unique Masonic god, and that belief in this Masonic god is contrary to the teachings of various mainstream religions (although usually noted in terms of being specifically contrary to Christian belief)
- That the 33rd degree of the Scottish Rite is more than an honorary degree, coupled with the belief that most Freemasons are unaware of hidden or secretive ruling bodies within their organization that govern them, conduct occult ritual, or control various positions of governmental power
- That there is a centralized worldwide body that controls all Masonic Grand Lodges, and thus, all of Freemasonry worldwide acts in a unified manner

== List of conspiracy theories associated with Freemasonry ==
Notable conspiracy theories involving Freemasonry include:

=== Political ===
- That the British judiciary is heavily infiltrated with Masons, who give fellow Masons "the benefit of the doubt" in court, subverting the legal system

Some conspiracy theories involving the Freemasons and the Illuminati also include the Knights Templar and Jews as part of the supposed plan for universal control of society. This type of conspiracy theory was described as early as 1792 by multiple authors, beginning in France and Scotland.

- That Freemasonry is a Jewish front for world domination or is at least controlled by Jews for this goal. An example of this is the antisemitic literary forgery The Protocols of the Elders of Zion. Adolf Hitler believed that Freemasonry was a tool of Jewish influence, and outlawed Freemasonry and persecuted Freemasons partially for this reason. The covenant of the Palestinian Islamist movement Hamas claims that Freemasonry is a "secret society" founded as part of a Zionist plot to control the world. Hilaire Belloc thought Jews had "inaugurated freemasonry "as a bridge between themselves and their hosts"
- That Freemasonry is tied to or behind Communism. The Spanish dictator Francisco Franco had often associated his opposition with both Freemasonry and Communism, and saw the latter as a conspiracy of the former; as he put it, "The whole secret of the campaigns unleashed against Spain can be explained in two words: masonry and communism". In 1950, Irish Roman Catholic priest Denis Fahey republished a work by George F. Dillon under the title Grand Orient Freemasonry Unmasked as the Secret Power Behind Communism. Modern conspiracy theorists such as Henry Makow have also claimed that Freemasonry intends the triumph of Communism
- That Freemasons are behind income taxes in the US. One convicted tax protester has charged that law enforcement officials who surrounded his property in a standoff over his refusal to surrender after his conviction were part of a "Zionist, Illuminati, Free Mason [sic] movement". The New Hampshire Union Leader also reported that "the Browns believe the IRS and the federal income tax are part of a deliberate plot perpetrated by Freemasons to control the American people and eventually the world"

=== Religious ===
There are a number of claims that Freemasons at higher degrees deceive those at lower degrees, and gradually reveal a separate, occult religion:

- That Freemasons worship Baal, Baphomet, Dajjal, or Rahu
- That Freemasonry is occult in nature and worships their own particular god, such as GAOTU the "Great Architect of the Universe", Gnosis, or Jahbulon, an amalgam of the gods YHWH, Baal, and Osiris

=== Other ===
- That Freemasons (at NASA and other space agencies) deceive the public to hide the Earth being flat
- That humanoid reptiles are behind secret societies like the Freemasons and the Illuminati
- That some prominent murders involved Freemasons, including the cases of the Italian banker Roberto Calvi, and the U.S. president John F. Kennedy. A conspiracy theory about the death of the Turkish president Mustafa Kemal Atatürk is that he was poisoned to death by the Freemasons due to the closure of Masonic lodges in Turkey in 1935. In 2015, Yeni Şafak claimed that his former prime minister İsmet İnönü was in charge of planning the murder.

== Masonic conspiracy theories in mass culture ==
- The Prague Cemetery, a novel by Umberto Eco
- The Lost Symbol, a novel by Dan Brown
- From Hell, a graphic novel by Alan Moore

== See also ==
- Anti-Masonry
- Judeo-Masonic conspiracy theory
