= Eblana =

Possible ancient Irish settlement

Eblana (Greek: Έβλανα) is an ancient Irish settlement that appears in the Geographia of Claudius Ptolemaeus (Ptolemy), the Greek astronomer and cartographer, around the year 140 AD. It was traditionally believed by scholars to refer to the same site as the modern city of Dublin. The 19th-century writer Louis Agassiz used Eblana as a Latin equivalent for Dublin. However, more recent scholarship favours the north County Dublin seaside village of Loughshinny due to its proximity to Drumanagh, an important trading site with links to Roman Britain; it has even been described as a bridgehead of a possible Roman invasion. However, there is no definitive proof to tie Eblana to any location, so its exact identity remains a matter of speculation.

== Eblana as Dublin ==
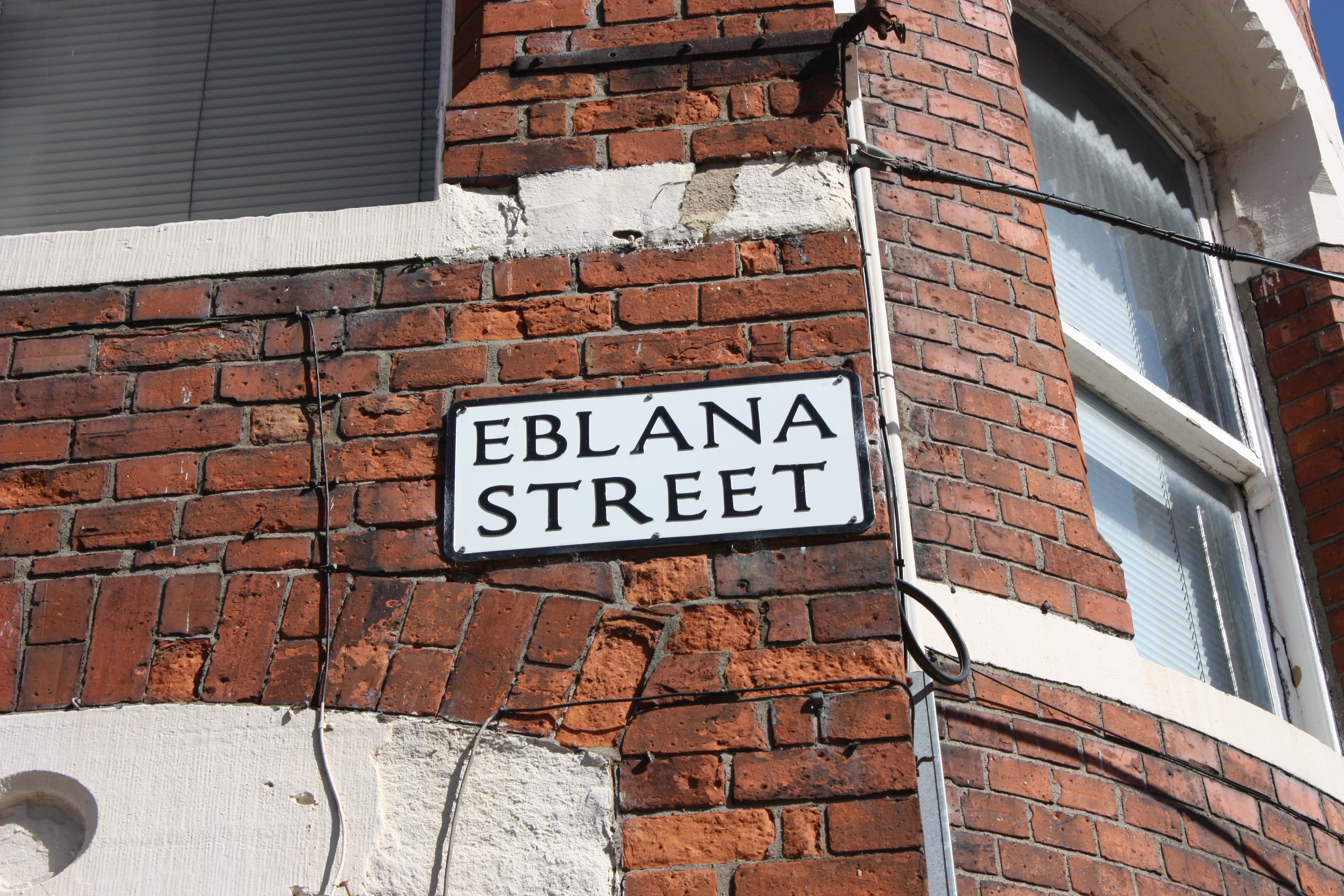
Eblana Street in Belfast

If the reference to a settlement in Ireland called Eblana is in fact the earliest reference to Dublin, this would seem to give Dublin a just claim to nearly two thousand years of antiquity, as the settlement must have existed a considerable time before Ptolemy became aware of it.

Eoin MacNeill writes that Eblana "cannot be Dublin, for no trace has been found in Irish records or tradition of anything approaching in character to a city on the site occupied by Dublin until the Norsemen fortified themselves here in 841" and speculates that Eblana "is certainly farther north than Dublin, probably on the coast of Louth".

Early Irish antiquarians, such as Sir John Ware and Walter Harris believed that the name Eblana in Ptolemy's Geographia was in fact a corruption of Deblana, itself a version of the Gaelic name Dubh Linn (Black Pool), from which the modern English language name Dublin derives. This is not the only instance where Ptolemy truncated the initial letters of place names. For example, instead of Pepiacum, and Pepidii (in Wales), Ptolemy writes Epiacum and Epidii, and for Dulcinium (now Ulcinj, in Montenegro), he writes Ulcinium.

There are several problems with this theory:

- The earliest Gaelic settlement on the site of Dublin is referred to in local sources as Áth Cliath ("Ford of Hurdles"). Duiblinn first appears as the name of a Christian ecclesiastical settlement which could not have existed before the 5th century.
- According to T. F. O'Rahilly, Ptolemy's description of Ireland shows no trace of the Goidelic occupation of the country, which probably took place some centuries before Ptolemy's time. O'Rahilly concludes that Ptolemy's description is probably based on data collected in the 4th century BC by the early explorer Pytheas. However, O'Rahilly's early-20th-century hypotheses about the colonisation of Ireland are not well accepted by modern scholars.
- The location on Ptolemy's map for Eblana seems to place the settlement in the north of County Dublin, several kilometres from the site of the modern city of Dublin.
- Ptolemy's Eblana did not stand on a river. In the Geographia, Eblana sits between the mouths of two rivers: the Buvinda (i.e. the River Boyne) and the Oboka. Because early antiquaries believed that Eblana was Dublin, they identified the Oboka with the river which enters the sea at Arklow in County Wicklow, which they consequently dubbed the Ovoca (now the River Avoca). In fact, Ptolemy's Oboka seems to be the River Liffey, and his Modonnos probably represents the Avoca. Eblana, thus, is located somewhere between the mouths of the Boyne and the Liffey.

== Eblana as other sites ==
When Ptolemy wrote the Geographia there were two significant areas of activity in north County Dublin.

One was at the mouth of the Delvin River where two substantial groups of chamber tombs would have been clearly visible from the sea for several thousand years. The Irish language name of the river is An Ailbhine, with the earliest recorded form being Ailbine c. 680. Metathesis is certainly present in Irish, with different dialects using different forms (e.g. bosca/bocsa "box" or deartháir/dreatháir "brother"), but there is no record of the name with -bl- rather than -lb-.

The second area of international activity was based around the promontory fort of Drumanagh south of present-day Loughshinny, which was probably a trading post but may have been used as a potential bridgehead by Agricola. Iron Age burials on nearby Lambay Island have also yielded Romano-British brooches and metalware.

== See also ==
- History of Dublin
- Eblana Theatre
