= Denis Fahey =

Irish Catholic priest (1883–1954)

The Reverend Denis Fahey C.S.Sp
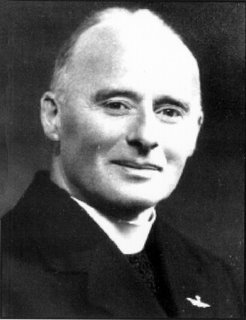
- Fahey in 1936
- Born: 3 July 1883; Golden, County Tipperary, Ireland
- Died: 21 January 1954 (aged 70)
- Occupations: Priest, philosopher, theologian
- Writing career
- Genres: Scholasticism, Social Catholicism
- Subjects: Christ the King, monetary reform, counterrevolution
- Notable works: The Rulers of Russia, Money Manipulation and Social Order

Denis Fahey, C.S.Sp. (3 July 1883 – 21 January 1954) was an Irish Catholic priest. Fahey promoted the Catholic social teaching of Christ the King, and was involved in Irish politics through his organisation Maria Duce. Fahey believed that "the world must conform to Our Divine Lord, not He to it", defending the theological concept of the Mystical Body of Christ. This often saw Fahey in conflict with systems which he viewed as promoting "naturalism" against Catholic order – particularly communism, freemasonry and rabbinic Judaism. His writings were deeply antisemitic, Fahey stating that "we must combat Jewish efforts to permeate the world with naturalism. In that sense, as there is only one divine plan for order in the world, every sane thinker must be an anti-Semite".

== Early life and studies ==
Born in Golden, County Tipperary he was educated at Rockwell College and at 17 entered the Holy Ghost Congregation to train to become one of the Holy Ghost Fathers. He was sent by the order to Orly in 1900 as a novice, not long after the government of René Waldeck-Rousseau had begun an anti-clerical drive in the aftermath of the Dreyfus Affair. Although illness prevented him from completing his time in France, the episode was to influence his later ideas on relations between Church and State. As a youth Fahey had excelled at rugby union and he had played on the same team as Éamon de Valera for a time, cementing a lifelong association between the two.

After working at St. Mary's College, Dublin, Fahey returned to studies at the Royal University of Ireland in 1904, achieving a first class honours degree, later studying at the Pontifical Gregorian University in Rome before finally being ordained a priest in 1910. Returning to Ireland, he was appointed to the senior scholasticate of the Irish Province of the Holy Ghost Fathers at Kimmage in 1912.

== Early writings ==
Fahey began to turn his attention to writing in the early 1920s, submitting articles for a number of Catholic journals, including the Irish Ecclesiastical Record, most of which were philosophical in nature. Coming from a position of neo-Scholasticism, his early theological works included Kingship of Christ According to the Principles of St. Thomas Aquinas, with its foreword written by Father John Charles McQuaid, the head of Blackrock College. At this early stage Fahey had little involvement in political issues, beyond being a strong supporter of Catholic Action as a bulwark against secularisation. In this respect Fahey was one of a number of prominent clergymen, including McQuaid, Edward Cahill and Alfred O'Rahilly, who praised what they saw as the value of Catholic Action in this respect.

It was in his books, most notably The Kingship of Christ and Organized Naturalism (1943) and The Mystical Body of Christ and the Reorganisation of Society (1945), that Fahey began to turn his attention to more political matters. Much of Fahey's anti-Judaic stance influenced other members of the church, such as Father Charles Coughlin, a Canadian priest who regularly used references on his radio programs from Fahey's work. The Coughlinite National Union of Social Justice distributed 350,000 copies of Fahey's book The Rulers of Russia in the United States during the 1930s, serving to greatly amplify Fahey's ideas.

== View of history ==
In Fahey's doctrine, history was to be understood as the "account for the acceptance or rejection of Our Lord's programme for order". He argued that the medieval guild system had come closest to reaching the programme, and that since then society had gone into decay as it moved away from the ideal. The three main events in this process of decay had been the Protestant Reformation, the French Revolution and the October Revolution, the last being initiated by Satan. Fahey believed that the gradual Sovietization of the British Empire and the United States had begun through the founding of the Fabianism movement.

Fahey felt that the contemporary Catholic Church faced its greatest challenge from the forces of naturalism, be they invisible (Satan and other demons) or visible (Jews and Freemasons). Tapping into contemporary campaigns by parties such as Cumann na nGaedheal, Fahey wrote a series of articles for John J. O'Kelly's Catholic Bulletin attacking Freemasonry in particular and secret societies in general, referring frequently to the work of Edward Cahill. Fahey regularly corresponded with antisemitic theorists outside Ireland, such as the British conspiracy theorist Nesta Webster, an important influence. His works appeared in the French language in Canada, having been translated by Adrien Arcand.

He felt that there was a Judeo-Masonic conspiracy against the programme of Christ, and among other statements asserted that Jews had a hand in the propagation of communism. As a result, Fahey opposed the Irish Republican Army, which he believed was a communist organisation.

== Monetary reform ==
In his 1944 book Money, Manipulation and Social Order, Fahey turned towards the subject of economic reform. In this book he attacked gold standard economies, which he felt were debt-driven. Drawing on the ideas of Frederick Soddy, with whom he was in regular correspondence, Fahey wanted banks to be forced to balance all loans with holdings of currency. Although he was not directly linked to such contemporary movements as Social Credit or Guild socialism, Fahey certainly shared elements of their economic ideas. He had previously written in support of the views of An Ríoghacht – which advocated an Irish monetary system completely independent of the United Kingdom – in an article for the journal Hibernia in 1938.

== Maria Duce ==
Fahey had been closely involved with Edward Cahill's An Ríoghacht study group, although following Cahill's death in 1941 this organisation became more mainstream and less concerned with conspiracy theories. As a result, Fahey began to organise his own group, Maria Duce, the following year to continue this work. With a membership drawn from various facets of society and with a programme largely the same as Fahey's, Maria Duce came to prominence in 1949 by launching a campaign to amend Article 44 of the Constitution of Ireland. This article had recognised the "special position" of the Catholic Church in Ireland although it also recognised various Protestant creeds, as well as Judaism. Ireland became the first country to recognise the rights of minority faiths such as Judaism as equal with the majority faith in its constitution. Fahey argued that this was insufficient and that the Constitution should recognise the Catholic Church as being divinely ordained and separate from 'man-made' religions. Fahey called into question the loyalty of Irish Jews to the Irish State. The campaign succeeded in securing a resolution of support from Westmeath County Council in 1950, but no further progress towards the goal of a constitutional amendment was made.

== Archbishop McQuaid ==
Fahey's writings have been a source of controversy, both in his lifetime and since. Writing to Joseph MacRory in 1942, Archbishop John Charles McQuaid of Dublin stated that

Dr Fahey will certainly not err in doctrine, but he is capable of making statements and suggestions that are not capable of proof by any evidence available to the censors... I have been obliged to watch carefully his remarks upon the Jews. [He] will frequently err in good judgement, and this error will take the shape of excerpts from newspapers as proof of serious statements, unwise generalisations and, where Jews are concerned, remarks capable of rousing the ignorant or malevolent. In his own Congregation, Fr Fahey is not regarded as a man of balanced judgement. He is a wretched Professor, obscure and laborious.

Although Fahey's Maria Duce organisation was initially left to its own devices, Archbishop McQuaid grew less sympathetic to it in the latter half of the 1950s. He condemned the group for their heavy-handed reaction to requests for an interview from the anti-Catholic American writer Paul Blanshard (whom Bishop McQuaid felt should have been treated courteously despite disagreeing strongly with him). McQuaid went as far as to write to Fahey in 1954 stating that he opposed the latter's association of the name of the Blessed Virgin Mary with his organisation. Fahey died before any response could be made, and the group was disbanded the following year; McQuaid took on the group afterward.

== Legacy ==
Fahey left behind a large written body of work that he did not protect by copyright, instead leaving it in the public domain. Some of his publications remain in print in the United States, where he continues to have a following. Antisemitic activist L. Fry also promoted much of Fahey's work on the decay of Christianity. People in Irish political circles also tried to set up movements adopting some of Fahey's strong beliefs on Catholicism, coupled with a more extreme form of nationalism; such figures included Gearóid Ó Cuinneagáin, founder of far-right organisation Ailtirí na hAiséirghe and Gerry McGeough, who founded the magazine The Hibernian.

Fahey's surviving papers are housed at the Irish Spiritan Archives at Kimmage Manor, Dublin.

== Character ==
Fahey was known to be sensitive to criticisms of his work and was even driven to physical illness by anti-Christian arguments. He avoided social gatherings and was uncomfortable meeting people, which was in part caused by his consistent bouts of migraine. Archbishop McQuaid, despite his severe criticisms of Fahey's writings, described him as "a most exemplary priest, of deep sanctity, and a man who will very generously sacrifice his time and health to help anyone: not a small sign of genuine holiness."

== Positions ==
=== Economics ===
Satan aims at a monetary system, by which human persons will be subordinated to the production of material goods, and the production, distribution and exchange of material goods will be subordinated to the making of money and the growth of power in the hands of the financiers. He [Satan] is pleased that money is employed as an instrument for the elimination of the Divine Plan and for the installation of Naturalism.

— Fr. Denis Fahey
written in The Kingship of Christ and Organized Naturalism, 1943.

In economic views, Fahey was a critic of the Lockean liberal capitalist system and what he regarded as the "social good" being made subordinate to the needs of the market. He pointed to usury being contrary to Catholic social teaching and spoke out against the newspaper industry and its power to form public opinion, he claimed that finance capitalism had come to dominate politics and economics, which it was meant to be subordinate to. He criticised "the unlimited competition, unscrupulous underselling and feverish advertising of the present day" and opined that capitalism led to extreme inequality, "ruthless, unchecked […] tended towards the concentration of capital in the hands of the relatively few."

Fahey also blamed capitalism "with its excessive individualism and uncontrolled seeking for profit", for causing a backlash which naturally attracted many people to embracing communism. Likewise, in his work The Tragedy of James Connolly he criticised James Connolly's support for "Marx’s wrong philosophy" (and reproached his involved in America with "the Jew, De Leon"). Consistent with his general conspiratorial outlook in regard to the Jewish influence in society, he saw Marxism (and in particular Bolshevism) as not a genuine attempt to address the abuses of capitalism but as, "an instrument in the hands of the Jews for the establishment of their future Messianic kingdom". For Fahey, post-Christian European economic life oscillated between the "false" theories of "the Dutch Jew Ricardo and the German Jew Marx”, seeing "the pendulum swinging from the extreme error of Judaeo-Protestant Capitalism to the opposite extreme error of the Judaeo-Masonic Communism of Karl Marx."

In common with the aims of earlier Irish campaigns such as the Irish National Land League from the period of the Land War and having much in common with later thinkers such as Fr. John Fahy of Lia Fáil, Fahey championed the family-based smallholder farmer stating that the "Divine Plan for order" called for wide diffusion of property ownership among the people, so that families could procure sufficient material goods required for a virtuous life. The heads of these families would be organised into unions of owners and workers, in guilds or corporations, "reflecting the solidarity of the Mystical Body in economic organization." Many of these ideas cross over with Catholic corporatism, guild socialism and Distributism. Like fellow Irish priests Fr. Edward Cahill and Fr. Richard Devane, he pointed to the pre-capitalist Middle Ages and the guild system as a more rightly ordered ideal. Within Fahey's worldview both economics and politics must be subordinate to the "moral law binding on members of Christ."

== Books ==
- Fahey, Denis. Mental Prayer According to the Teaching of Saint Thomas Aquinas. Dublin: M.H. Gill, 1927.
- Fahey, Denis. The Kingship of Christ, According to the Principles of St. Thomas Aquinas. Dublin, London: Browne and Nolan, Ltd, 1931.
- Phillippe, A., and Denis Fahey. The Social Rights of Our Divine Lord Jesus Christ, the King. Dublin: Browne and Nolan, 1932.
- Philippe, Auguste, and Denis Fahey. The Social Rights of Our Divine Lord, Jesus Christ, the King; Adapted from the French of the Rev. A. Philippe, C. SS. R. Dublin [etc.]: Browne and Nolan, 1932.
- Fahey, Denis. The Mystical Body of Christ in the Modern World. Dublin: Browne and Nolan, 1935.
- Le Rohellec, Joseph, Denis Fahey, and Stephen Rigby. Mary, Mother of Divine Grace. Palmdale, Calif: Christian Book Club of America, 1937.
- Joannès, G., and Denis Fahey. O Women! What You Could Be. [Dublin]: Browne and Nolan, 1937.
- Fahey, Denis. The Mystical Body of Christ and the Reorganization of Society [Imprimatur 1943]. Waterford, Ireland: Browne and Nolan, 3rd edition, 1939.
- Fahey, Denis. The Rulers of Russia. 3rd American edition, revised and enlarged. Detroit: Condon Print. Co., 1940.
- Fahey, Denis. The Kingdom of Christ and Organized Naturalism. Wexford, Ireland: Forum Press, 1943.
- Fahey, Denis. Money Manipulation and Social Order. Cork: Browne and Nolan Ltd, 1944.
- Fahey, Denis. The Tragedy of James Connolly. Cork: Forum Press, 1947.
- Fahey, Denis. The Rulers of Russia and the Russian Farmers. Maria Regina series, no. 7. Thurles: Co. Tipperary, 1948.
- Fahey, Denis. Grand Orient Freemasonry Unmasked as the Secret Power Behind Communism. 1950. republication of George F. Dillon's work.
- Fahey, Denis. Humanum Genus: Encyclical Letter of His Holiness Pope Leo XIII on Freemasonry. London: Britons Publishing Society, 1953.
- Fahey, Denis. The Church and Farming. Cork: The Forum Press, 1953.
- Fahey, Denis. The Kingship of Christ and the Conversion of the Jewish Nation. Dublin: Holy Ghost Missionary College, 1953.
- Fahey, Denis. The Rulers of Russia. 3d. Ed., Rev. and Enl. Hawthorne, Calif: Christian Book Club of America, 1969.
- Fahey, Denis. Money Manipulation and the Social Order. Dublin: Regina Publications, 1974.
- Fahey, Denis. Secret Societies and the Kingship of Christ. Palmdale, Calif: Christian Book Club of America, 1994.
- Fry, L., and Denis Fahey. Waters Flowing Eastward; The War against the Kingship of Christ.. London: Britons Pub. Co, 1965.

== Bibliography ==
- The Coughlin-Fahey Connection: Father Charles E. Coughlin, Father Denis Fahey, C.S. Sp., and Religious Anti-Semitism in the United States, 1938–1954, Mary Christine Athans, P. Lang, 1991 New York, ISBN 0-8204-1534-0

== See also ==
- Joseph McCarthy
- Judeo-Masonic conspiracy theory
- Catholicism and Freemasonry
- Catholic social teaching
- Christianity and antisemitism
- Charles Coughlin
- Leslie Fry
