= Hibernia =

Classical Latin name for Ireland

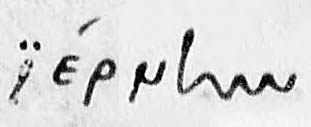
Ireland (Ἰέρνην) in Strabo's Geographica, from an 11th century manuscript

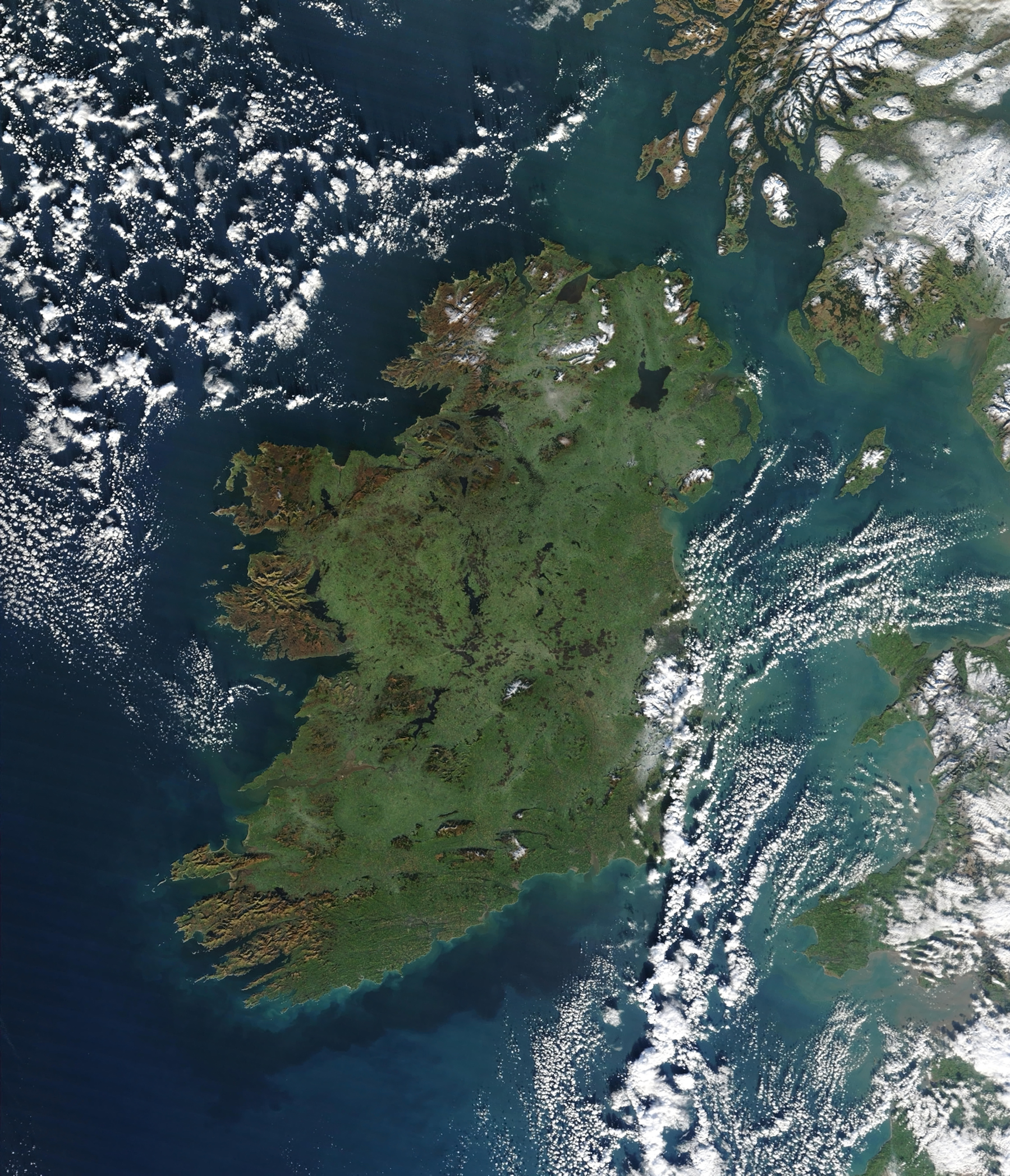
True-colour satellite image of Ireland

Hibernia (Latin: [hiːˈbɛr.ni.a], [hɪˈbɛr.ni.a]) is the Classical Latin name for Ireland, and today is used as a poetic name for the island. It is derived from the native Celtic name for the island and its people, but influenced by the Latin hībernus, as though it meant "wintry land".

The name Hibernia or Ibernia as a name for Ireland dates back to the 1st century BC, when Julius Caesar used it in his Commentarii de Bello Gallico. It then became the main Latin name for Ireland. Roman geographer Pomponius Mela and the poet Juvenal, writing in the 1st century AD, call Ireland Iuverna. In his 2nd century Geographia (c. 150 AD), Greek geographer Ptolemy called the island Iouernia or Iwernia (Ἰουερνία; ou represented /w/). In the 4th century, Claudian calls the island Hiverne.

All of these names are believed to come from a Q-Celtic name *Īweriū, meaning "fertile land". From this eventually arose the Irish names Ériu and Éire.

== Post-Roman usage ==
The High King Brian Boru (c. 941–1014) based his title on being emperor of the Scoti, which was in Latin Imperator Scottorum, emperor of the Gaels. From 1172, the Lordship of Ireland gave the King of England the additional title Dominus Hibernie (sic, for Hiberniae; also Dominus Hybernie), 'Lord of Ireland'. The Kingdom of Ireland created the title Rex Hiberniae, King of Ireland, for use in Latin texts. Gerardus Mercator called Ireland "Hybernia" on his world map of 1541. In 1642, the motto of the Irish Confederates, a Catholic-landlord administration that ruled much of Ireland until 1650, was Pro Deo, Rege et Patria, Hibernia Unanimis, 'For God, king and fatherland, Ireland united'.

By the classicising 18th century, the use of Hibernia had revived in some contexts, just as had the use of Caledonia, one of the Latin terms for Scotland, and Britannia for Britain. "Hibernia" was used on Irish coins in the 1700s, and on a 2016 2 euro coin. Companies such as the Hibernian Insurance Company were established (later renamed the Hibernian Group). The name took on popularity with the success of the Irish Patriot Party. At a time when Palladian classical architecture and design were being adopted in northern Europe, Hibernia was a useful word to describe Ireland with overtones of classical style and civility, including by the prosperous Anglo-Irish Ascendancy who were taught Latin at school. "Hibernian" was used as a term for people, and a general adjective. The Royal Exchange in Dublin was built during 1769–1779 with the carved inscription "SPQH" for Senatus Populusque Hibernicus, 'the senate and people of Ireland'. The Royal Hibernian Academy dates from 1823.

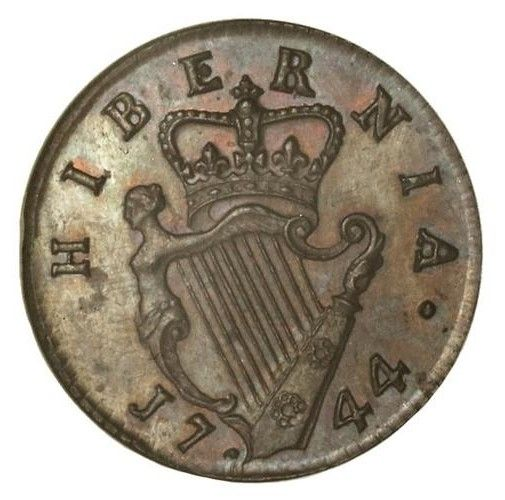
Reverse side of a 1744 Farthing which includes the term for its lettering

The 18th-century Spanish regiment composed of Irish exiles was known as the Regiment of Hibernia.

Hibernia is a word that is rarely used today with regard to Ireland, except in long-established names. It is occasionally used for names of organisations and various other things; for instance: Hibernia National Bank, Hibernian Insurance Group, Ancient Order of Hibernians, The Hibernian magazine, Hibernia College, Hibernian Orchestra, Hibernian Football Club, HMS Hibernia, and modern derivatives, from Latin like Respublica Hibernica, 'Irish Republic' and Universitas Hiberniae Nationalis, 'National University of Ireland'. In Canada, Hibernia lends its name to the Hibernia oil field off Newfoundland, and to a large offshore oil platform, the Hibernia Gravity Base Structure.

Another occurrence is in familial Hibernian fever or TRAPS (tumour necrosis factor receptor-associated periodic syndrome), a periodic fever first described in 1982 in a family of Irish and Scottish descent, but found in all ethnic groups.

The compound form 'Hiberno-' remains more common, as 'Hiberno-Norse', 'Hiberno-English', 'Hiberno-Scottish', 'Hibernophile', etc.

The Scottish football clubs Hibernian FC and Dundee Hibernian (now Dundee Utd) have adopted the name.

== See also ==
- Hibernia (personification)
- Hiberno-English
- Hiberno-Roman relations
- Hibernophile
- Drumanagh
- Scotia
