= Edward Cahill (priest) =

Irish Jesuit

The Reverend Edward Cahill SJ
- Born: 18 February 1868; Callow, Ballingrane County Limerick, Ireland
- Died: 16 July 1941 (aged 73)
- Occupations: priest, writer, theologian
- Writing career
- Genres: Scholasticism, Social Catholicism
- Subjects: Catholic social teaching, Irish history, Anti-Masonry, Antisemitism
- Notable works: Freemasonry and the Anti-Christian Movement

Edward J. Cahill, S.J. (18 February 1868–16 July 1941) was an Irish Jesuit priest and academic, born in Ballyvocogue, Cappagh, County Limerick. He was educated in Theology at Maynooth, and ordained a priest in 1897. He served on the staff of Mungret College and in the years before the Easter Rising he was known for facilitating Irish Volunteers in their training in Mungret. In 1924, he joined the staff of the Jesuit Milltown Park Institute in Dublin as Professor of Church History, Lecturer in Sociology, and later, Spiritual Father.

In October 1926, on the occasion of the first celebration of the Feast of Christ the King, he founded "An Ríoghacht", the League of the Kingship of Christ. The object of this society was to ensure the use of Catholic Social Teaching in the Irish Free State. "An Ríoghacht", under Fr. Cahill's guidance, organised public meetings three or four times a year, published pamphlets on current topics and even attempted to produce a weekly paper to further its ideals. This organisation would go on to form the basis of Fr. Denis Fahey's Maria Duce.

Cahill's anti-mason message, delivered in the 1920s and 1930s, also served as an analysis and apologetic against Talmudic Judaism. In his works he cites papal teaching which describes the Masons as enemies of the Catholic Church, and gives evidence that these same Masons are influenced and given guidance by Jews:

The modern anti-Christian movement, which centres around Liberalism, owes much of its rapid progress to the secret society of the free masons...Freemasonry today is the enemy of the Church and every Catholic Government and Catholic institution in the world. It is closely associated with Modern Judaism (including Rationalistic Jews, as well as those of the Talmud and Cabala); and is largely under Jewish influence and guidance

He was a regular contributor the Irish Ecclesiastical Record and the Irish Monthly. His works often stressed the link between Catholicism and nationalism.

He died on 16 July 1941, aged 73, after a long illness.

== Bibliography ==
Books

- The Abbot of Mungret, a play in 4 acts. (1925);
- Freemasonry and the anti-Christian Movement Dublin: M.H. Gill & Son, 1929, 1930 2nd ed., rev. and enl.
- The Framework of the Christian State (1932) reprinted.

Pamphlets

- The Truth about Freemasonry (Australian C.T.S.)
- The Catholic Social Movement (Irish Messenger Office)
- Rural Secondary Schools (I.M.O.)
- Ireland and the Kingship of Christ (I.M.O.)
- The Oldest Nation in Europe (I.M.O.)
- Ireland as a Catholic Nation (I.M.O.)
- Ireland's Peril (Messrs. Gill)
- Capitalism and its Alternatives (I.C.T.S.).
