= Irish Vigilance Association =

The Irish Vigilance Association was a society established in Ireland in 1911 under the auspices of the Dominicans. Its objective was to prevent the spread of "bad and unsavoury literature" by enrolling members in a "Good Literature Crusade". The "crusade" was directed against "immoral" literature and the perceived excesses of the English press, and was later extended to the cinema.

== The Committee on Evil Literature ==
Along with the Catholic Truth Society of Ireland the association conducted campaigns in favour of censorship of books and films. Until 1923 censorship had been the responsibility of local authorities. Along with Dublin Corporation (whose scheme of having twenty-two censors had proved unwieldy) and the Priest Social Guild, the association lobbied the Minister for Home Affairs, Kevin O'Higgins, to take action. In 1926 O'Higgins created the Committee on Evil Literature to look into the censorship of publications. Based on advice from the association and the Marian Sodalities and other organisations, the committee warned against "vulgar and suggestive photographs designed to inflame the passions" and any perceived threat to "public morality". Information on contraception was recommended against, as such seditious material was reckoned to be conducive to "sensual indulgence for those who desire to avoid the responsibilities of the married state". However, the Irish Vigilance Association had to admit that it had been less than successful "in the cause of clean literature" since its foundation.

== Cinema ==
Film censorship was set up in Ireland by an act introduced by O'Higgins in 1923. The censor was required to withhold certificates from any films he deemed to be "indecent, blasphemous or obscene". In 1935 the conservative Catholic association An Ríoghacht issued a statement to the Irish Times to indicate that it was taking over leadership of the cinema censorship issue from the, by then moribund, Irish Vigilance Association.

== See also ==
- Censorship in the Republic of Ireland
