= An Ríoghacht =

Conservative Catholic group in Ireland

An Ríoghacht ([ənˠ ɾˠiəxt̪ˠ], Irish for "The Kingdom"), also called the League of the Kingship of Christ, was a conservative Catholic group in Ireland, founded in 1926 by Fr Edward Cahill, Professor of Church History and Lecturer in Sociology at the Milltown Park Institute, Dublin.

== Development ==
The group was established in mid 1926, with Cahill writing to Archbishop Edward Joseph Byrne in October 1926 to inform him that his organisation had been in existence for some months and to announce the formation of a Provisional Committee featuring Sir Joseph Glynn, George Gavan Duffy, prominent judge Michael J. Lennon, J. Durnin, Patrick Waldron and three priests. The new organisation attracted some prominent members, including the economist Berthon Waters, the publisher Eoin O'Keefe, Peter O'Loghlen TD, Gabriel Fallon a critic and Maurice Moynihan and O.J. Redmond, two senior members of the civil service. At lower levels the organisation established branches across Ireland, with six branches established in Dublin, two each in Cork and Kilkenny and one each in Waterford, Mullingar, Nenagh and Bray.

The organisation had several hundred members at any given time although it did not retain membership, rather instructing those who joined in the intricacies of Catholic social teaching, before encouraging them to go off and spread what they had learned either independently or as members of other more community-based Catholic societies. Between 1935 and 1939 the group ran high-profile Summer Schools to promote their aims and teachings. It did not however seek a mass membership, preferring an elitist structure and seeking to attract only those in positions of influence to its ranks.

== Aims and campaigns ==
The object of this society was to ensure the use of Catholic Social Teaching, and embed Catholic doctrine in the legal structure, in the Irish Free State. Fr Cahill viewed with great apprehension the power of international Freemasonry, Communism and Jewry. The society organised public meetings three or four times a year, published pamphlets on current topics and attempted to produce a weekly paper to further its ideals.

Cahill strongly supported a rural basis for Ireland and used An Ríoghacht to further this aim. In 1928 he devised a "Scheme for Social Re-construction" which was to set up "Catholic Agricultural Colonies" that would, he argued, attract people away from the twin pulls of city life and emigration. He argued that ruralism would both encourage Irish autarky, which the group advocated, as well as a decent and wholesome lifestyle that would become the hallmark of Ireland internationally. The group also became active in support of cinema censorship, issuing a statement to the Irish Times in 1935 to indicate that it was taking over leadership of the issue from the moribund Irish Vigilance Association. As a result of their campaign the Irish government imposed heavy tariffs on the import of 35mm film and eventually helped to established, with Church support, the National Film Institute.

== Banking Commission ==
The group sent a delegation to provide evidence to the Banking Commission of 1934–1938 to advocate their monetary reform aims. Their submissions mostly focused on their support for the replacement of private banking with a single National Bank of Ireland and for control of fiduciary policy to be taken away from politicians and given over to professional economists attached to this bank. The criticisms that An Ríoghacht levelled at the eventual report by the commission, would go on to form the basis of the economic policy of Clann na Poblachta, with Seán MacBride having been close to members of An Ríoghacht. An Ríoghacht entered into a print battle with Edward Coyne over the issue, with Coyne accusing the movement of purposefully twisting papal encyclicals to support their views, with An Ríoghacht countering that the policies they advocated had been the same as those used by the Estado Novo which, they contended, had transformed a backward and impoverished Portugal into a successful country. The influential Fr. Denis Fahey also came out in support of An Ríoghacht, endorsing their arguments in the Knights of Saint Columbanus journal Hibernia.

In August 1938 Cahill was a keynote speaker at a Muintir na Tíre event and he used the occasion to attack the lack of attention afforded to the An Ríoghacht-backed Commission minority report, suggesting that it was part of a deliberate attempt to bring about the destruction of Irish agriculture. The speech was made at a point when Cahill's superiors in the Society of Jesus were having major concerns about his stern criticism of the government, with issues also raised about Cahill's competence as an economist and even his mental state. Eventually Cahill was ordered to be silent on the issue of monetary reform and he did not publicly raise the issue again before his 1941 death.

== Post-Cahill ==
An Ríoghacht continued to exist for around twenty years after Cahill's death and continued to be an influential organisation for much of that time. As well as the influence of their ideas on Clann na Poblachta, George Gavan Duffy became President of the High Court in 1946 and in this role had a profound influence on Article 40 of the Constitution of Ireland, which he interpreted as an extension of Catholic teaching. The organisation formed the basis of Fr. Denis Fahey's Maria Duce, a right-wing, anti-Semitic organisation, with much of its membership trained by An Ríoghacht.

Under the presidency of Brian J McCaffrey the movement was involved in a number of conservative campaigns in the 1950s, such as actively supporting members of the Waterford District Football League who were attempting to force the Republic of Ireland national football team to pull out of a match with their counterparts from Yugoslavia on the grounds that they did not wish to associate with communists. However the influence of the group was on the wane and by the early 1960s it had disappeared altogether.

== See also ==
- Maria Duce
- Lia Fáil (political party)
