= Hibernophile =

Lover of Ireland and Irish culture

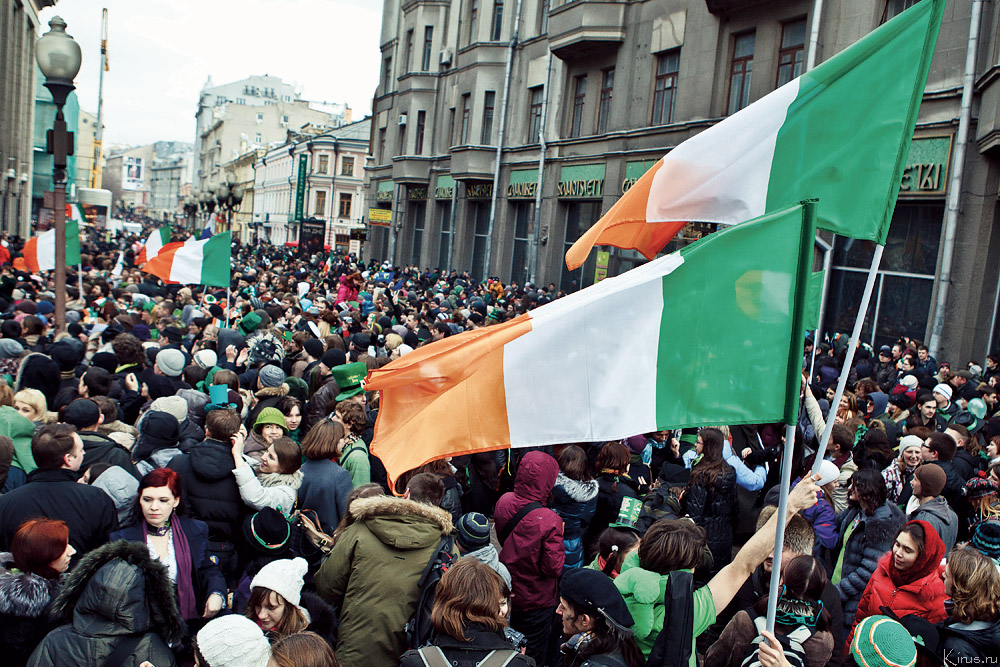
Moscow hosts an annual Saint Patrick's Day festival, 2012

A Hibernophile is a person who is fond of Irish culture, Irish language and Ireland in general. Its antonym is Hibernophobe. The word originates from "Hibernia", the word used by the ancient Romans to refer to Ireland.

The term is often used in particular for people all over the world (in America especially in areas where many Irish diaspora settled) who ostensibly base their business, political, or social practices on like of or admiration for Irish models. In some cases, Hibernophilia represents an individual's preference of Irish culture to their own, or the belief that Irish culture is superior, or appreciation of Irish history.

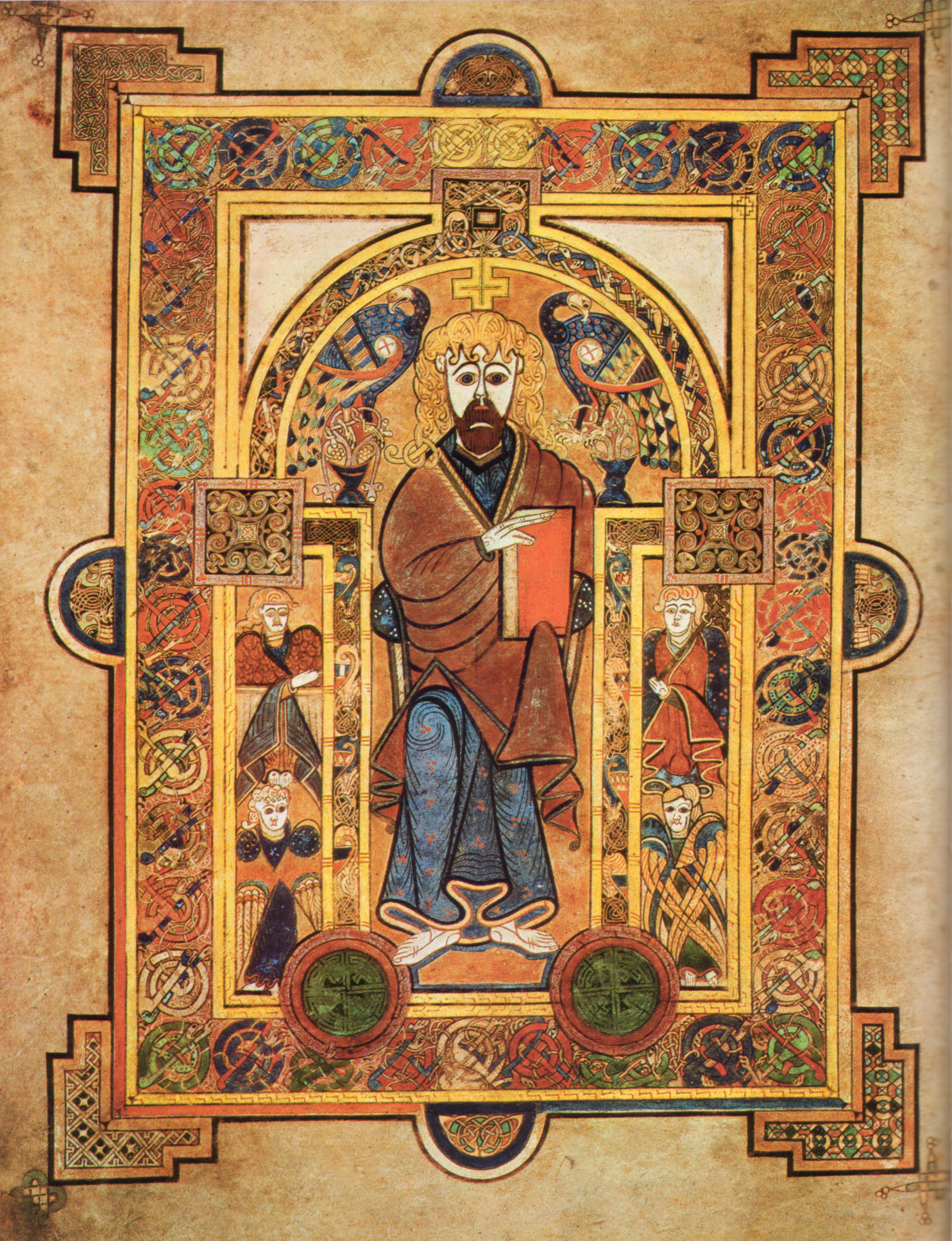
Icon of Christ Enthroned from the Book of Kells (9th century)

Despite the island's small geographic size, Ireland has traditionally been a phenomenal wellspring of significant cultural output, which historically had a strong influence on other neighboring countries in Britain, such as Scotland, Wales, England, and the Isle of Man, in various ways, especially in the areas of religion, education, art, music, theatre and literature. (These countries in turn, have historically influenced Ireland as well.) Additionally, Ireland's outsized Irish diaspora is a tremendous source of hibernopilia in the modern world; the engine that drives Ireland's successful tourism industry. The far-flung Irish Diaspora has carried Irish culture around the world and is largely responsible for most hibernophilia (and even hibernomania) today.

Major streams of Ireland's culture which attract hibernophiles include the Irish language, various types of Irish traditional music, such as the Uilleann pipes and Celtic harp, the history and Irish heraldry of Irish clans, traditional Celtic Christianity, Insular art, Celtic studies, and Irish dance, which rocketed to global prominence after the successful rise of Riverdance. The Irish literary tradition is particularly strong; not only due to modern Irish literature composed in English, but also Early Irish literature written in Latin, in one of Western Europe's oldest written vernacular literature. Sport in Ireland draws from a global fanbase, especially those interested in Ireland's unique Gaelic games.

Hibernophiles often enjoy attending St. Patrick's Day parades that occur all over the world. Conversely, those who tend to favour shallow, stereotypical aspects of Irish culture, such as Leprechauns and shillelaghs, green beer and plastic bowler hats may also be called a Plastic Paddy; a pejorative term in Ireland, which refers to a person who appropriates stereotypical aspects of Irish culture without a deeper understanding.

== Famous Hibernophiles ==
- King George V, who served as a naval officer based in Cork.
- Empress Michiko of Japan; lover of Irish poetry and can speak Irish.
- Former Princess Mako Komuro of Japan, who studied abroad in Dublin.
- Waclaw Dobrzynski, Russo-Polish soldier and diplomat
- Hilaire Belloc, Franco-English writer and historian of the early 20th century.
- Michel Déon, French writer
- Henry Cowell, American composer
- French Count Charles Forbes René de Montalembert
- American author Robert E. Howard, creator of Conan the Barbarian and father of the sword and sorcery genre.
- American author Frank Herbert, best known for the 1965 novel Dune
- Author C. S. Lewis, creator of The Chronicles of Narnia, and many Christian-themed texts; born in Belfast and self-identified as Irish.
- American actress Olivia Wilde.

== See also ==
- Ancient Order of Hibernians
- Culture of Ireland
- Plastic Paddy
