= Hiberno-Roman relations =

Historical social relations between Ireland and ancient Rome

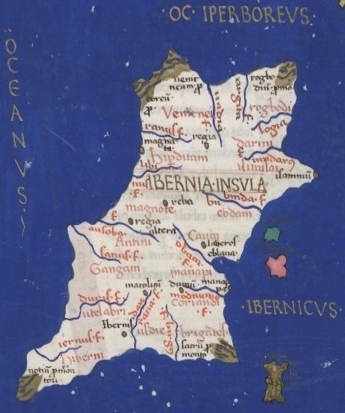
A map of Hibernia as described by Ptolemy.

Hiberno-Roman relations refers to the relationships (mainly commercial and cultural) which existed between Ireland (Hibernia) and the ancient Roman Empire, which lasted from the 1st century BC to the 5th century AD in Western Europe. Ireland was one of the few areas of western Europe not conquered by Ancient Rome.

== Characteristics ==
Rome never annexed Hibernia (the Latin name for Ireland) into the Roman Empire, but did exert influence on the island, although only a small amount of evidence of this has survived.

This influence was expressed in three characteristic ways: commercial; cultural and religious; and military.

=== Commercial ===
The relationship between Rome and Hibernia was mostly commercial. In 1995, scholar Richard Warner wrote that after emperor Claudius' invasion of southern Britannia, the trade routes between the Mediterranean Sea and Roman Britannia encompassed even Hibernia. The geographer Ptolemy, in his map of the 1st century AD, pinpointed the coastal settlements and tribes of Ireland, showing a knowledge that (it is suggested) only merchants could have achieved in that century. Additionally, there are many Roman archaeological objects (mainly jewellery and Roman coins) found in areas of central and southern Ireland (such as Tara and Cashel), that reveal a relationship. Roman coins have also been found at Newgrange.

According to the theory of Thomas Charles-Edwards, who wrote about the Irish Dark Age, between the 1st and 3rd century there was a depopulating slave trade from Hibernia toward rich Roman Britain, that had an economy based on villa farming and wanted slaves to perform the heaviest labour in agriculture. As the empire declined, this relationship may have reversed, as the biography of Saint Patrick suggests, and the Irish of Late Antiquity may have anticipated the later role of Irish Vikings as raiders across the Irish Sea.

=== Cultural and religious ===
The religious influence of the late Roman Empire involved the conversion to Christianity of many Irish people before the arrival of Saint Patrick in the century when the Western Roman Empire disappeared. The first reliable historical event in Irish history, recorded in the Chronicle of Prosper of Aquitaine, is the ordination by Pope Celestine I of Palladius as the first bishop to Irish Christians in 431 - which demonstrates that there were already Christians living in Ireland, before Palladius or Patrick. Prosper says in his Contra Collatorem that by this act Celestine "made the barbarian island Christian", although it is clear the Christianisation of Ireland was a longer and more gradual process.

Apart from the introduction of a new religion, the cultural influence from Rome can be seen even in the clothes (and glades) of high-ranking people inside Celtic tribes of the 3rd and 4th centuries. The Ogham alphabet and writing system (which was probably first invented in the 4th century at Irish settlements in west Wales), may have been derived from the Latin alphabet after contact and intermarriage with Romanized Britons with a knowledge of written Latin however this is disputed by some scholars. In fact, several Ogham stones in Wales are bilingual, containing both Old Irish and Latin-influenced Brythonic (the ancestor of contemporary Welsh) inscriptions.

=== Military ===
There is some evidence of possible exploratory expeditions during the time of Gnaeus Julius Agricola, although the interpretation of this is a matter of debate amongst historians. In places like Drumanagh (interpreted by some historians to be the site of a possible Roman fort or temporary camp) and Lambay island, some Roman military-related finds may be evidence for some form of Roman presence. The most commonly advanced interpretation is that any military presence was to provide security for traders, possibly in the form of an annual market where Romano-British and Irish met to trade. Other interpretations, however, suggest these may be merely Roman trading outposts, or native Irish settlements which traded with Roman Britain. Later, during the collapse of Roman authority in the 4th and 5th centuries, Irish tribes raided Britain and may have brought back Roman knowledge of classical civilization.

== Roman presence in Hibernia ==
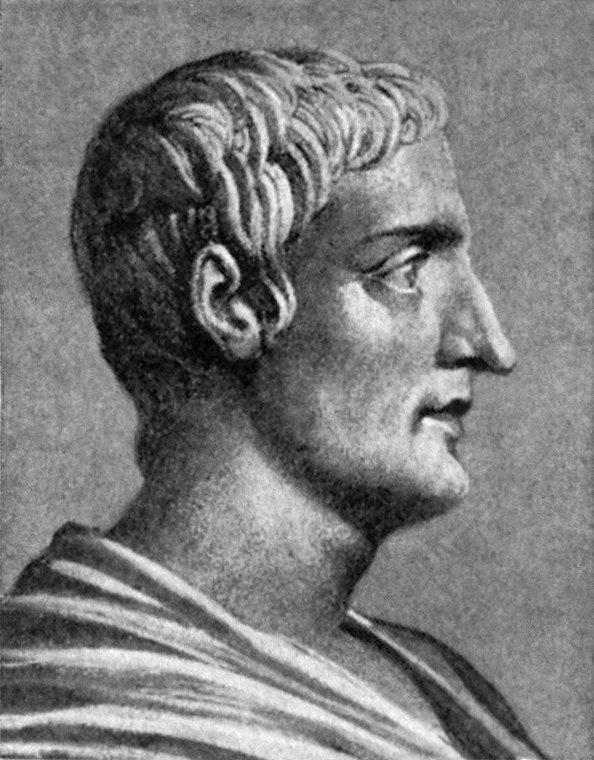
Tacitus wrote that the Roman general Agricola in 82 crossed the sea (of Ireland?) from western Britain and conquered "tribes unknown" to Romans

The Roman historian Tacitus mentions that Agricola, while governor of Roman Britain (AD 78 - 84), considered conquering Ireland, believing it could be held with one legion plus auxiliaries. He entertained an exiled "regulus", a petty king from Ireland, thinking to use him as a pretext for a possible invasion of Ireland. This chieftain has been identified with Túathal Techtmar, who, in a 9th century poem, is reported to have been driven out of Ireland by a revolt, later returning with an army to conquer Ireland.

The 2nd-century Roman poet Juvenal, who may have served in Britain under Agricola, wrote that "arms had been taken beyond the shores of Iuverna (Hibernia)". This may refer to a genuine Roman military expedition to Ireland.

Roman and Romano-British artefacts datable to the late 1st or early 2nd centuries have been found, primarily in Leinster and notably in a fortified site on the promontory of Drumanagh, fifteen miles north of Dublin, and burials on the nearby island of Lambay, both close to where Túathal Techtmar might plausibly have landed, and also at other sites associated with Túathal such as Tara and Clogher. It is possible that the Romans may have given support to an Irish chieftain to regain his throne, in the interests of having a friendly neighbour who could restrain raiding from Ireland.

Such an invasion may have been the reason why the Brigantes are recorded in Ireland, as noted in Ptolemy's 2nd century Geography. The Brigantes were a rebellious British tribe, only recently conquered in Agricola's time. The dispossessed nobility may have been ready recruits for Túathal's invasion force, and the Romans might have found this a convenient way of getting rid of troublesome subjects, just as Elizabeth I planted English in Ireland and James VI & I planted Scots in Ireland in the 16th and 17th century. Other tribal names associated with south-eastern Ireland, including the Domnainn, related to the British tribal name Dumnonii, and the Menapii, a name also known from Gaul (Roman France), may also date from such an invasion.

== Roman Church influence ==
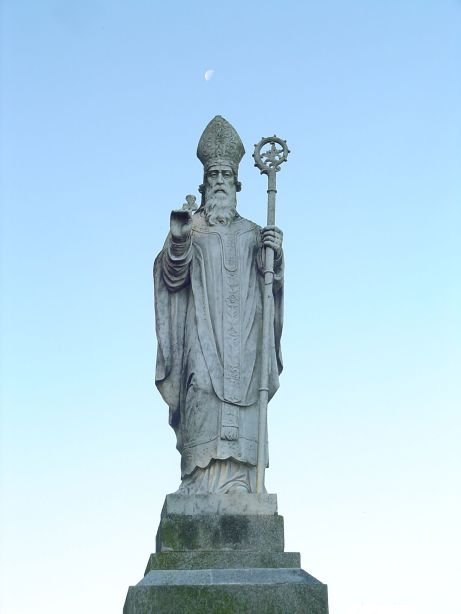
The Romano-Briton Saint Patrick, Patron Saint of Ireland

Irish religious belief and practices became Romanised after Saint Patrick and Saint Palladius began the slow process of spreading Christianity throughout Hibernia in the 5th century. One of the first churches in Hibernia was founded by Saint Palladius in 420 AD, with the name House of the Romans (Teach-na-Roman, actual Tigroney). However, actual contacts with Rome and Italy seem to have been erratic for much of this period, and there were also contacts with Egyptian Christianity.

The Romano-British Saint Patrick promoted the creation of monasteries in Hibernia and the older druid tradition collapsed, in the face of the new religion he brought. In the monastic culture that followed the Christianisation of Ireland, Latin learning was preserved in Ireland during the Early Middle Ages in contrast to some other parts of Europe, where the period popularly referred to as the Dark Ages followed the loss of Roman imperial authority over Western Europe. However, the concept of a period in which knowledge was lost and regression occurred in post-Roman Europe during the Early Middle Ages is no longer accepted by historians. In those monasteries, Hiberno-Latin was a learned sort of Latin literature created and spread by Irish monks during the period from the 6th to the 10th centuries.

== See also ==
- Drumanagh
- Túathal Techtmar
- History of Ireland
- Protohistory of Ireland
- Irish Dark Age

== Bibliography ==
- Cahill, Tim. How the Irish Saved Civilization. Anchor Books. London, 1996. ISBN 0-385-41849-3
- Charles-Edwards, Thomas. Early Christian Ireland. Cambridge University Press. Cambridge, 2000.
- Cooney, Gabriel. Ireland, the Romans and all that from Archaeology Ireland, Spring 1996.
- Di Martino, Vittorio. Roman Ireland, The Collins Press. London, 2003.
- Freeman, Philip. Ireland and the Classical World. University of Texas Press. Houston, 2001
- Swift, C. Ogam Stones and the Earliest Irish Christians. Maynooth: Dept. of Old and Middle Irish, St. Patrick's College, 1997. ISBN 0-901519-98-7
