= Gerry McGeough =

Irish republican (born 1958)

- Born: 2 September 1958 (age 68); Brantry near Dungannon, County Tyrone, Northern Ireland
- Known for: IRA Volunteer
- Military career
- Allegiance: Irish Republic
- Paramilitary: Provisional IRA
- Service years: 1975–1988
- Rank: Volunteer
- Unit: East Tyrone Brigade
- Conflicts: The Troubles

Terence Gerard 'Gerry' McGeough (born 1958, near Dungannon, County Tyrone) is a prominent Irish republican who was a volunteer in the Provisional Irish Republican Army (IRA), a former Sinn Féin activist and editor of the defunct The Hibernian magazine. McGeough broke with Sinn Féin in 2001 and he is now an independent Irish Catholic/nationalist activist. McGeough was set to serve 20 years of imprisonment after being found guilty in 2011 for attempted murder, although he was released two years later, on 29 January 2013, under the Good Friday Agreement.

== Early life ==
McGeough joined the Provisional IRA East Tyrone Brigade in 1975, aged 16. According to Tim Pat Coogan, Gerry McGeough was beaten by RUC interrogators at the barracks in Cookstown, County Tyrone in 1977, and was deported from Britain following a brief visit to London in 1978. McGeough had been arrested and interrogated for a full week before deportation, on suspicion that he was an IRA member. After activity in Ireland and Europe, he was arrested (along with another IRA member, Gerry Hanratty) in August 1988 while crossing the Dutch-German border with two AK47 rifles in his car. He was charged with attacks on the British Army of the Rhine and held for four years in a specially-built German detention centre. His trial in Germany was interrupted by extradition to the United States, where he was charged with attempting to buy surface-to-air-missiles in 1983. He served three years of his sentence in US prisons until his release in 1996 whereupon he was deported to the Republic of Ireland.

McGeough led Sinn Féin's opposition to the referendum on the Nice Treaty in the Republic of Ireland. He was also a Sinn Féin national executive (ard-comhairle) member before leaving the party.

== Post-Sinn Féin activism ==
McGeough is known for his opposition to what he perceives as "liberalism" within contemporary Sinn Féin:

You would never get a leader of Sinn Féin condemning abortion, homosexual "marriage" or anything of that nature. I, as an Irish nationalist and Roman Catholic, never want to see the day when there are abortion clinics in every market town in Ireland. But looking around there is no political grouping willing to take a stance against that.

He accompanied Justin Barrett on a lecture tour of Irish towns in March 2004, in support of Barrett's unsuccessful attempt to become a member of the European Parliament.

In May 2006, McGeough, as editor, and Charles Byrne, a 28-year-old from Drogheda, launched a monthly magazine called The Hibernian, dedicated to "Faith, Family and Country". The magazine had articles espousing the views of Father Denis Fahey and also promoted the Society of St. Pius X.

In 2007, McGeough declared he would be standing for election in the Northern Ireland Assembly elections against Sinn Féin in the Fermanagh and South Tyrone constituency. He put himself forward as a protest against Sinn Féin's vote in January 2007 to support the Police Service of Northern Ireland (PSNI), a key provision of the St Andrews Agreement. He polled 1.8% of the vote.

The Hibernian ceased publication in 2008.

In the same period, McGeough became associated with the Ancient Order of Hibernians, taking control of the organisation's branch in County Tyrone. McGeough was expelled from the Ancient Order of Hibernians in 2019.

Gerry McGeough was invited to join the American Ancient Order of Hibernians (A.O.H.) in 1992, becoming a member of Division 35 in Brooklyn, New York. The Division was noted for the fact that it proudly counted a long list of Irish Republican rebels among its membership since the mid-1800s.

Following his return to Ireland, he joined the A.O.H. (Board of Erin), a totally separate organisation from its American counterpart and was instrumental in establishing new Divisions in Dublin and Cork. (Citation: The Irish Family, August 2005).

In 2016, he was asked to run for President of the Tyrone County Board of the A.O.H. and was unanimously elected at Annual General Meetings for four years in succession. (Cit: Irish News, March 24, 2016). He immediately set about raising the media profile of the organisation and dramatically increasing its membership. (Cit: Ulster Herald, May 28, 2017).

He opened several new Divisions in the county, including ones specifically dedicated to pro-life activity (Cit: Irish News, October 15, 2016), opposing gold-mining in the Sperrin Mountains (Cit: November 29, 2016), and promoting the Irish language (Cit: Irish News, March 10, 2017).

He also initiated ‘Hibernian Day’ parades in Tyrone, which proved very successful. (Cit: Irish News, September 12, 2016), and launched the annual Easter Tuesday commemoration at the Republican Garden of Remembrance in honour of Ed Walsh, a member of the Hibernian Rifles who was killed in action in Dublin during the 1916 Easter Rising. (Cit: Irish News [letters] April 14, 2017).

In response to Sinn Féin officially adopting an extreme abortion policy, he had every A.O.H. Division in Tyrone sign a ‘Pro-Life Charter’ (Cit: BBC Ni, November 21, 2017), and led a delegation of Tyrone Hibernians to Armagh in order to formally present the Charter to the Archbishop of the diocese, Eamon Martin. (Irish News, March 16, 2018). In addition to developing the A.O.H. in Tyrone, McGeough also initiated the re-launch of the organisation in neighbouring County Fermanagh. (Cit: Fermanagh Herald, January 8, 2017). Furthermore, he spearheaded the re-opening of defunct Hibernian Halls in Tyrone (Cit: OfficialTyroneAOH @AOHTyrone, August 10, 2018).

Throughout his presidency, McGeough focused on establishing close contacts with the American A.O.H. and hosted several visits from American Hibernian delegations. (Cit: IrishCentral.com February 14, 2019).

His activities often provoked serious hostility from pro-British Unionist politicians and commentators, who regularly called for his expulsion from the A.O.H. (Cit: Newsletter, August 5, 2017; Nelson’s View Blog, February 25, 2019).

In early 2019, rumours began to circulate on social media that British Intelligence had placed an agent within the Tyrone A.O.H. who had been given specific instructions to stir-up trouble, chaos and dissent in order to cause maximum problems for McGeough’s presidency, pull him down and destroy the organisation in Tyrone. This came at a time when there was growing speculation from Hibernians across Ireland that McGeough would be elected as the organisation’s new National President at the next National Convention.

Commencing in April 2019 a hitherto inactive group of Tyrone Hibernians, who were known to be jealous of McGeough’s successes and virulently opposed to his Republican politics and strong Catholic views, launched an orchestrated campaign of frivolous complaints against his leadership. This resulted in the National Board, some of whom made no secret of their opposition to McGeough, suspending the entire Tyrone County Board of the organisation and calling for a new election at an Emergency General Meeting.

On his way into the meeting at Ardboe A.O.H. Hall on June 29, 2019, Gerry McGeough was informed on the roadside by a third party that he and a number of others had been expelled and would therefore not be eligible to vote, despite being properly selected delegates. There had been no hint of expulsions up until this point.

The fact that no procedure had been followed and that the style of the expulsion was utterly unconstitutional led to an instant rift within the A.O.H. in Tyrone. At no time since the meeting has McGeough received a letter signed by the National Board to confirm his expulsion and explain why it occurred, as is required by the organisation’s Constitution. Nor has he been given any right of appeal.

The bulk of the Tyrone A.O.H. membership has since withdrawn from the organisation. (Cit: Tyrone Courier, January 28, 2020).

== Arrest and conviction ==
On 8 March 2007 McGeough was arrested by the PSNI whilst leaving the election count centre in Omagh. The arrest was in connection with the 1981 shooting of Sammy Brush. Brush, an off-duty member of the Ulster Defence Regiment, was delivering mail in his job as a postman near Aughnacloy when he was shot. Brush, who was armed and wearing a bullet-proof vest, managed to return fire in the incident and shot and wounded McGeough who fled. McGeough and Vincent McAnespie were charged with attempted murder, conspiracy to murder and possession of firearms with intent to endanger life. Both men were remanded in custody to appear at Dungannon Magistrates' Court on 4 April 2007. McGeough was granted bail on 29 March. Gerry McGeough's lawyers have published a document they claim is proof that a Royal Pardon was given to another alleged IRA member, and questioned why McGeough was not treated similarly. The Northern Ireland Office has stated that it is instead Prerogative of Mercy that was applied to a small number of cases under the Early Release Scheme to resolve technical anomalies.

McGeogh was convicted in February 2011 of attempted murder, possessing firearms with intent, and IRA membership. He was sentenced in April 2011 to 20 years imprisonment, although under the Good Friday Agreement he served less than two years in jail, and was finally released on 29 January 2013.

McAnespie was acquitted of all charges against him.

== Comments on the judiciary ==
On 8 August 2016 McGeough was reported as saying that 'Catholics serving as judges and prosecutors in the Northern Ireland legal system are "traitors" who will be dealt with as "collaborators" once the English are removed. The chairman of the Bar Council of Northern Ireland, Gerry McAlinden QC, stated that "An independent, impartial judiciary and independent, impartial prosecuting counsel play a fundamental role in the maintenance of the rule of law and the protection of rights of all citizens in a free and democratic society ... Impartial and dedicated judges and prosecutors uphold the law and provide justice for victims and the community, and they should be allowed to work without fear or threat. Any attempt to intimidate members of the judiciary or members of the legal profession engaged in prosecution work is to be deplored by all right thinking members of society."

== Education ==
A teacher by profession, Gerry McGeough has a BA Honours Degree in History from Trinity College Dublin and later earned a postgraduate Higher Diploma in Education from University College Dublin.

== Published books ==
Gerry McGeough is the author of two books, The Ambush and other Stories (1996) and a novel, Defenders (1998). He has also published a number of articles in local history periodicals.
