= War of Anti-Christ with the Church and Christian Civilization =

1885 book by George F. Dillon

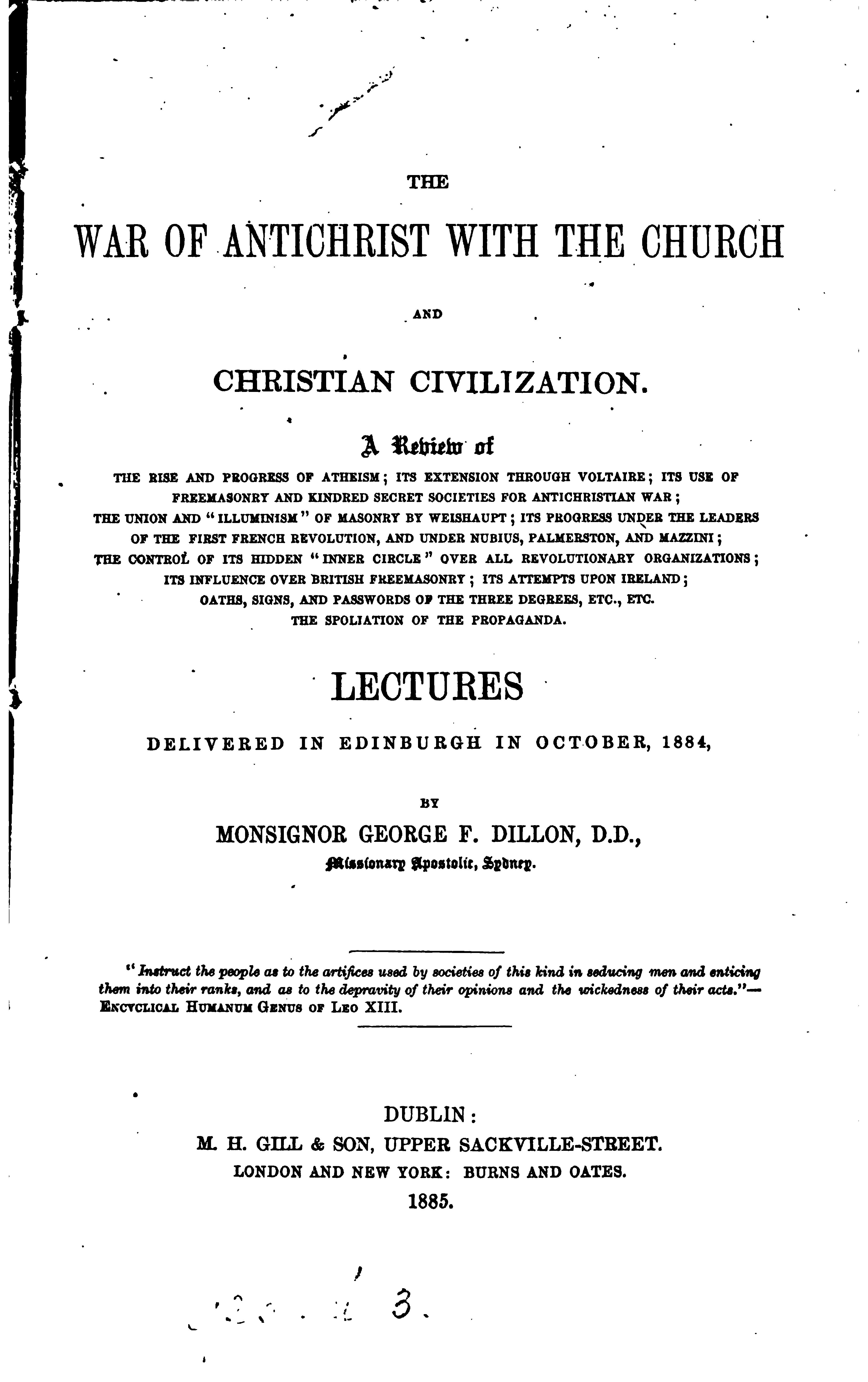
- Author: George F. Dillon
- Language: English
- Genre: Religion, politics
- Published: 1885 M.H. Gill & Son
- Publication place: Britain and Ireland
- Pages: 173
- Nihil Obstat: 3 May 1885, W. Fortune, D.D. Imprimatur: 4 May 1885, Gulielmus J. Canon. Walsh

The War of Anti-Christ with the Church and Christian Civilization is a book written in 1885 by an Irishman, Msgr George F. Dillon, DD. It was republished in a slightly edited form by Fr Denis Fahey in 1950 as Grand Orient Freemasonry Unmasked as the Secret Power Behind Communism. The central theme of the book alleges that atheistic Illuminism, through the infrastructure of Grand Orient freemasonry, driven by the ideology of the philosophes laid the foundations for a large scale, ongoing war against Christendom in general and the Catholic Church in particular. The document claims that it had been manifested primarily through manipulating the outbreak of various radical liberal republican revolutions, particularly those focused on atheism or religious indifferentism in their anti-Catholicism. The book details revolutionary activity in France, Italy, Germany and Ireland.

Included within the scope of the book is material on the Illuminati, Kabbalism, Jacobinism, the French Revolution, the Carbonari and Fenianism. The Carbonari Alta Vendita document was given wider exposure in the English-speaking world after being first translated for the book and then placed within a historical context. The book was influential to Catholic integralism in Ireland, Britain and the United States, as well as national conservative politics. Fahey, who republished the book in the 1950s, founded the Maria Duce political movement, critical of Fenianism and associating it with Communism. It instead proposed an Irish National Catholicism under the social and spiritual reign of Christ the King. The company which republished it, the Britons Publishing Society, described the book as "of worldwide importance".

== Background ==
=== Hypothesis on the French Revolution ===
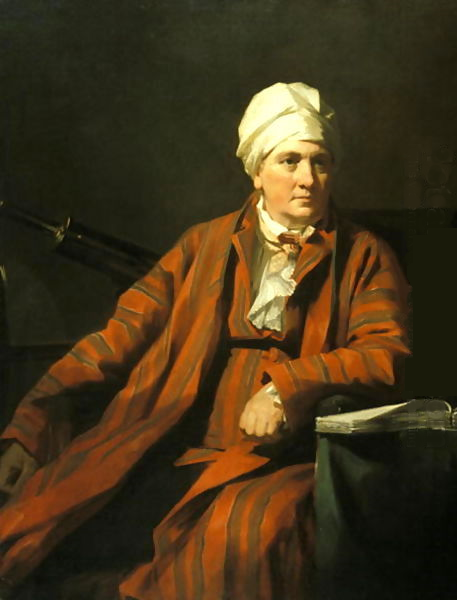
John Robison authored a similar book in 1797, entitled Proofs of a Conspiracy

Following the French Revolution society and politics across Europe began to change in a very radical way by the end of the 18th century. In an attempt to explain and understand this, several prominent authors and theorists released books on the topic. For instance Edmund Burke's Reflections on the Revolution in France (1790) and Joseph de Maistre's Considerations on France (1796). Some asserted vividly that the French Revolution was the result of a deliberate conspiracy or plot to overthrow the monarchy, the Church and aristocratic society in Europe, allegedly hatched by a coalition of philosophes, Freemasons and the Order of the Illuminati. The conspirators created a system that was inherited by the Jacobins who operated it to its greatest potential.

The two best-known authors of the latter "New World Order" theory are French Jesuit priest Augustin Barruel, who authored the Memoirs Illustrating the History of Jacobinism in 1799. As well as John Robison a respected British academic and inventor who was a professor of philosophy at the University of Edinburgh and Secretary to the Royal Society of Edinburgh. Robison's book released in 1797 was called Proofs of a Conspiracy against All the Religions and Governments of Europe, carried on in the Secret Meetings of the Free Masons, Illuminati, and Reading Societies.

=== Bonaparte and the Revolutions of 1848 ===
Essentially the book published by George F. Dillon is a continuation of the latter tradition, reiterating the points but filling in the gaps of events since. Between the late 18th century and the release of the book in 1885, there had been several more political developments, including the rise and fall of Napoleon Bonaparte out of the French Revolution, creating the First French Empire. There had also been numerous secular radical nationalist rebellions during the Revolutions of 1848, some of which were successful such as the unification of Germany, while others failed. Some European countries also experienced a rise in clandestine radical groups like the Carbonari in the various Italian states and Fenianism in Dillon's native Ireland, which was then part of the United Kingdom with Great Britain.

We wish it to be your rule first of all to tear away the mask from Freemasonry, and let it be seen as it really is; and by sermons and Pastoral Letters to instruct the people as to the artifices used by societies of this kind in seducing men and enticing them into their ranks.

— Pope Leo XIII, Humanum genus, 1884.

Generally, most of Dillon's other book releases dealt with religious topics. He wrote a book about the Virgin Mother of Good Counsel, the Sacred Heart of Jesus, as well as a short piece on Irish history, specifically about Irish monasticism. Dillon was a Doctor of Divinity, an advanced academic degree in divinity, giving him license to teach Christian theology. He is known to have worked as a Catholic missionary in the Australian bush, where he founded a mission for the aboriginals at Burragorang, a place about 65 mi from Sydney.

In recent memory, the Papal States had been invaded and annexed by the new Kingdom of Italy, which left the Pope a prisoner in the Vatican. The Church had become aware of the secret societies such as the Carbonari and warned the public against them in encyclicals for their strongly anticlerical and antisocial nature.

A document was unveiled named the Alta Vendita, purportedly produced by the highest lodge of the Carbonari. It detailed a plan for long-term subversion of the Catholic Church by political liberalism, with the goal of promoting religious indifferentism, gradually eating away at Catholic dogma from within, to leave the Church a mere shell. Both Pope Pius IX and Pope Leo XIII requested for the document to be published to the general public. Indeed, Leo XIII called for the faithful to "tear away the mask from Freemasonry" in his encyclical Humanum genus published in 1884. It was that year that Dillon put together what would become the contents of this book for a lecture in Edinburgh named the Spoliation of Propaganda.

== Chapter titles in 1885 print ==
Number	Chapter name	Number	Chapter name
I	Introduction	XIV	Permanent Instruction of the Alta Vendita
II	The Rise of Atheism in Europe	XV	Letter of Piccolo Tigre
III	Voltaire	XVI	The Intellectual and War Party in Masonry
IV	Freemasonry	XVII	Lord Palmerston
V	The Union and 'Illuminism' of Freemasonry	XVIII	War of the Intellectual Party
VI	The Illuminism of Adam Weishaupt	XIX	The War Party under Palmerston
VII	The Convent of Wilhelmsbad	XX	The International, the Nihilists, the Black Hand, &c.
VIII	Cabalistic Masonry or Masonic Spiritism	XXI	Freemasonry with Ourselves
IX	The French Revolution	XXII	Fenianism
X	Napoleon and Freemasonry	XXIII	Sad Ending of the Conspirators
XI	Freemasonry after the Fall of Napoleon	XXIV	The Triumph of Irish Faith
XII	Kindred Secret Societies in Europe	XXV	Catholic Organization
XIII	The Carbonari	XXVI	Catholic Total Abstinence Societies

Following the main text are sixteen pages of advertisements and newspaper reviews.

== Differences in versions ==
There are several differences between the original and republished work such as the latter omitting the last four chapters and renaming and reworking the first chapter.

The original contains a foreword by an unnoted author, a letter of endorsement from Pope Leo XIII dated 6 September 1885 and one signed 'JOHN CARDINAL SIMEONI, Prefect.' then below marked with a cross pattée 'D. Archbishop of Tyre, Secretary.' and dated 25 August 1885; they were omitted when reprinted in 1950. Instead, the work starts with a short publisher's foreword then a foreword signed 'Denis Fahey, C.S.Sp., Feast of the Sacred Heart of Jesus, June 15, 1950.'

The first chapter has been lightly edited to remove spurious greetings and comments on the hall in which the speaker delivers his lecture as well as remarks on the establishment of local Catholic organisations. The final four chapters are instead replaced by a 'conclusion' dealing largely with the subject of Ireland. Chapter XXIII, 'The sad fate of the conspirators', makes the claim that most Irish peasants refused to take aid from charities that demanded apostasy from the Catholic church, as part of its main theme that a righteous death is better than an unholy life. Chapter XXIV, 'triumph of the Irish faith', talks about the long and proud history of Catholic Ireland and predicts Ireland will be instrumental in the coming battle between Catholicism and Masonry. Chapter XXV includes praise for contemporary Catholics who are working to expose and eradicate heresy, including Leo XIII and the Society of Jesus. The final chapter talks again about Irish piety, especially of Irish immigrants, but also claims poverty among Irish Catholics is from drunkenness and argues an abstinent Ireland would be free from the influence of secret societies.

== Synopsis ==
Covering the rise and progress of atheism; its extension through Voltaire; its use of Freemasonry and kindred societies for anti-Christian war; Weishaupt and Illuminism; its progress in the First French Revolution, and under Nubius, Palmerston and Mazzini; the control of its hidden "inner circle" over all revolutionary organisations; its influence over British Freemasonry, and its attempts upon Ireland.

— George F. Dillon, 1885.

=== Rise of atheism into Illuminism ===
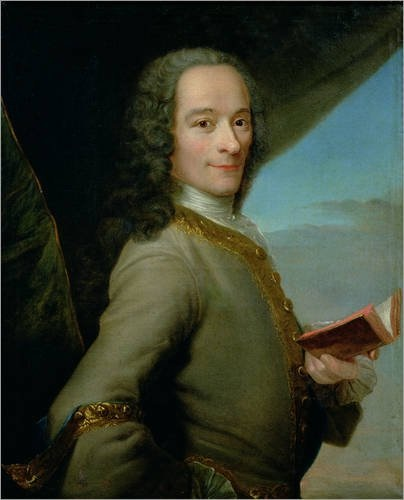
Voltaire.

== Reception and legacy ==
The work was granted nihil obstat status on 3 May 1885 by W. Fortune of the Censor Theologus Deputatus and a licence to be printed, an Imprimatur, the following day by Gulielmus J. Canon Walsh, Vic. Cap. Dublin.

In a letter dated 5 September 1885 and printed in the preface to the book, Leo XIII expresses his belief in the importance of the work and grants an Apostolic Benediction to its author. The letter is followed by one from Cardinal Simeoni, Prefect of the Sacred Congregation Of Propaganda, now called the Congregation for the Evangelization of Peoples, expressing his gratitude for the advantage this work will provide in his task of spreading Catholicism.

== See also ==
- New World Order
- Catholicism and Freemasonry
- International-Communist-Judeo-Masonic conspiracy
