= Alta Vendita =

1859 document

Permanent Instruction of the Alta Vendita
- Cover of 1999 book on the Alta Vendita which contains important excerpts of the Permanent Instruction, published by Vennari
- Author: Italian Carbonari (allegedly)
- Genre: Religion, politics
- Published: 1859; recently 1999 (TAN Books & Publishers)
- Pages: 43

The Permanent Instruction of the Alta Vendita (commonly called the Alta Vendita, "high marketplace") is a document originally published in Italian in 1859, claimed by some Catholics to have been produced by the highest lodge of the Italian Carbonari and written by "Piccolo Tigre" ("Little Tiger").

"Piccolo Tigre" is supposedly the pseudonym of a Jewish Freemason (according to George F. Dillon, a proponent of the theory of a Masonic war against Christian civilisation).

== Content ==
The author, who wrote under the pseudonym "Piccolo Tigre" is also claimed to be the author of other 19th century Masonic documents.

== Outcome and legacy ==
Pope Pius IX urged the Alta Vendita to be exposed to public scrutiny. It was first published in Jacques Crétineau-Joly's book L'Église romaine en face de la Révolution in 1859.

The document was popularised in the English speaking world by Monsignor George F. Dillon's 1885 book War of Anti-Christ with the Church and Christian Civilization.

Alta Vendita was analyzed in a monograph by John Vennari.

== See also ==
- Anticlericalism and Freemasonry
- New World Order (conspiracy theory)
- War of Anti-Christ with the Church and Christian Civilization
- Nicodemite
- The Protocols of the Elders of Zion
