= Jacques Crétineau-Joly =

French journalist and historian (1803–1875)

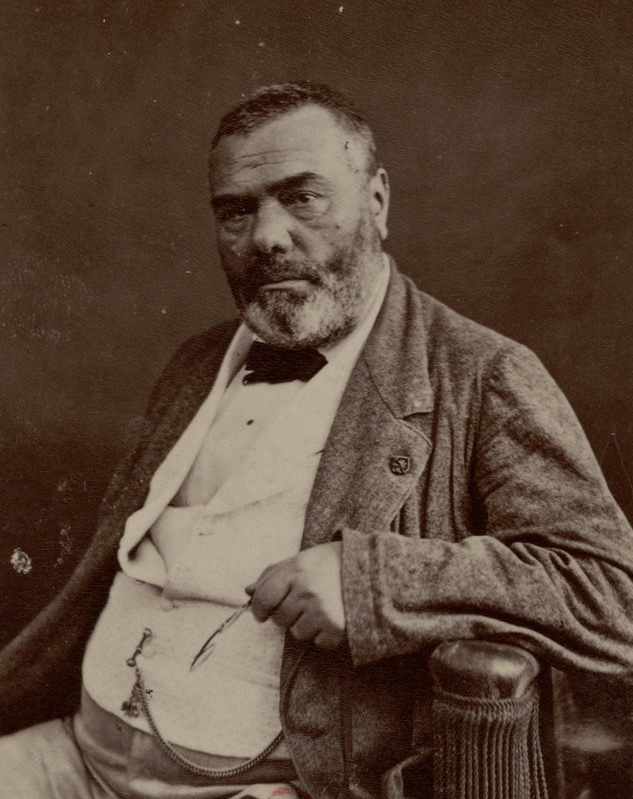

Jacques Crétineau-Joly (23 September 1803 – 1 January 1875) was a French Catholic journalist and historian, known both for his political activism and for his extensive histories of the Jesuits.

== Biography ==
Crétineau-Joly was born at Fontenay-le-Comte, Vendée, and attended school in Luçon. At first he studied theology at the seminary of Saint-Sulpice, Paris, but, feeling that he had no vocation, he left after a stay of three years, during which he received the tonsure. He was now in his twentieth year; he quickly obtained the professorship of philosophy at the college in his native town, but soon resigned the position on account of ill-health.

After an initial attempt to travel to Rome ended in shipwreck off the coast of Monaco, Crétineau-Joly was able to reach Rome in 1823, as companion and private secretary to the French ambassador, the Duke of Laval-Montmorency. While in Rome, Crétinau-Joly met Ercole Consalvi, and after Consalvi's death in 1824, published a Memoirs of Cardinal Consalvi. On 25 August 1825, he preached in San Luigi dei Francesi with Pope Leo XII in attendance. Before leaving Rome, Crétineau-Joly also, in 1826, published Chants romains, which contained verses of an irreligious character.

Returning home in 1828, Crétineau-Joly accepted a chair of humanities at the Little Seminary of La Rochefoucauld, which he again had to quickly resign due to his health. He took a job as a tutor for a family in Confolens, sending money home to his parents to help pay off their debts. During this time he issued a number of volumes of poems and dramas, including Les Trappistes (Angoulême, 1828), Inspirations poétiques (Angoulême, 1833), and other poems. In 1830, he married.

After the 1830 revolution, Crétineau-Joly, a passionate Vendean, became active as a polemical journalist. His first book, Mélanges, was published in 1833 and dedicated to Marie-Caroline of Bourbon-Two Sicilies, Duchess of Berry, who had recently instigated a revolution in the Vendée. He passionately advocated for the restoration of the House of Bourbon in a number of Legitimist newspapers, first publishing in the Vendéen, then becoming editor of L'Europe monarchique, and finally moving to Paris and becoming editor of L'Hermine. About this time, Crétineau-Joly also wrote Épisodes des guerres de la Vendée (1834) and Histoire des généraux et chefs vendéens (1838), which he later combined and expanded as Histoire de la Vendée militaire (Paris, 1840–41). The work brought him repute on account of the animated descriptions, the clear arrangement of the great mass of material, and his painstaking care in the use of authorities. It is suggested, though, that he was less than scrupulous as to how he obtained his materials.

Crétineau-Joly's reputation outside France was largely due to his religious-political writings, especially his six-volume history of the Society of Jesus: Histoire religieuse, politique et littéraire de la Compagnie de Jésus (first published in 1844) and the companion volume Clément XIV et les Jésuites (first published in 1847). These pro-Jesuit works formed part of a larger controversy over the Jesuit order; Augustin Theiner and Vincenzo Gioberti published anti-Jesuit rejoinders, while Gustave Delacroix de Ravignan wrote to defend the Jesuits. Later historians have questioned the accuracy of Crétineau-Joly's histories of the Jesuits, characterizing them as "patently apologetic".

In May of 1846, Pope Pius IX met personally with Crétineau-Joly in the Quirinal Palace, and asked him to write a history of secret societies. For this purpose, he gave Crétineau-Joly a number of documents on the Alta Vendita, including seized correspondence. Crétineau-Joly used this material to compose L'Église romaine en face de la Révolution.

Crétineau-Joly died in Vincennes near Paris.

== Main works ==
- Histoire religieuse, politique et littéraire de la Compagnie de Jésus, (6 vol.), Paris-Lyon, 1845.
- Clément XIV et les Jésuites, Paris-Bruxelles, 1847.
- Lettre au Père A. Theiner, Bruxelles-Paris, 1853.
- L'Église romaine en face de la Révolution, 2 vol., 1859 Google books.
