= Drumanagh =

Headland in County Dublin, Ireland

Coordinates: 53.54°N 6.08°W

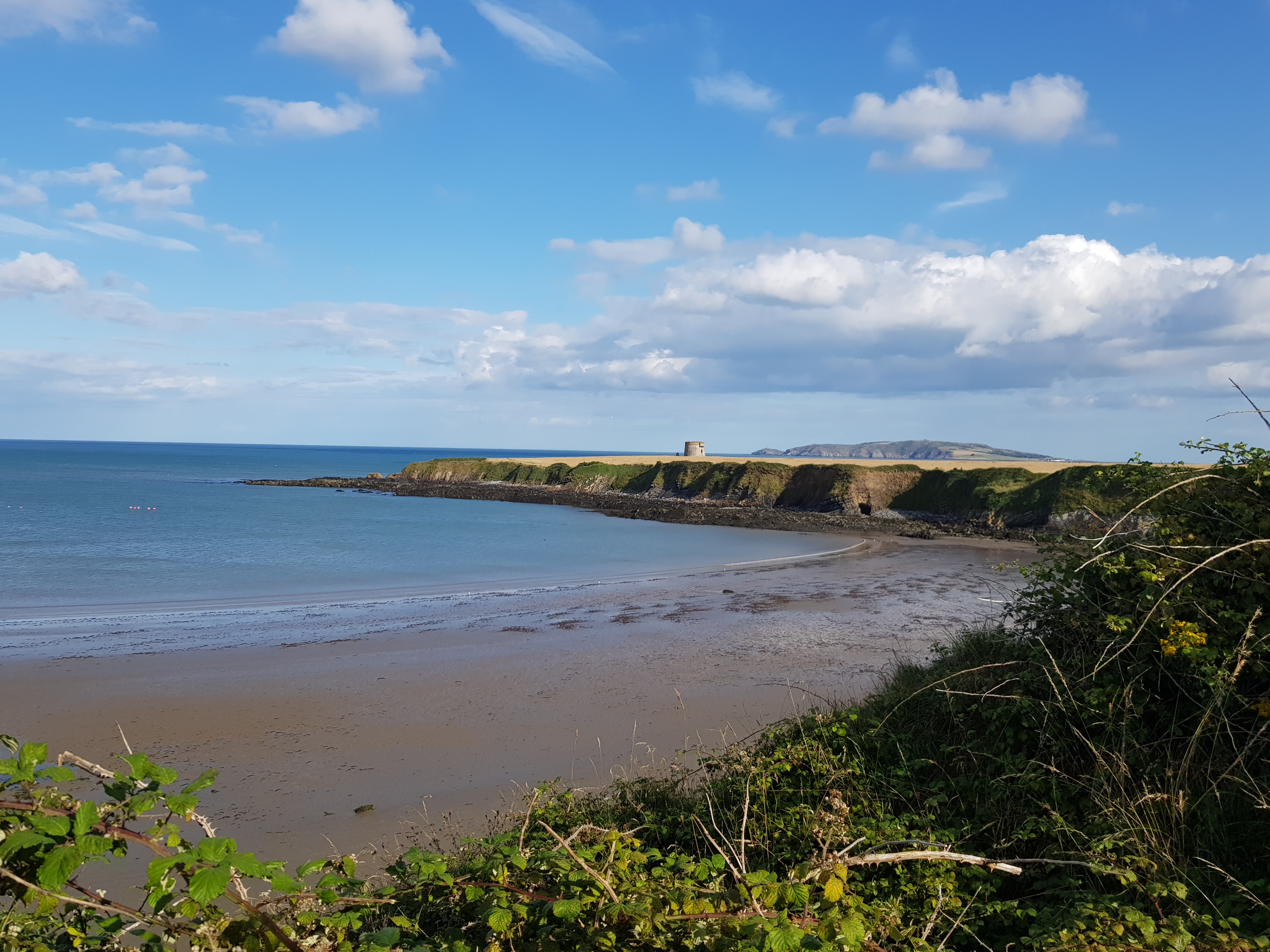
View from Loughshinny of Drumanagh with its Martello Tower

Drumanagh (Irish: Droim Meánach) is a headland near the village of Loughshinny, in the north east of County Dublin, Ireland. It features an early 19th-century Martello tower and a large (200,000 m^{2}) Iron Age promontory fort which has produced Roman artefacts.

Some archaeologists have suggested the fort was a bridgehead for Roman military campaigns, while others suggest it was a Roman trading colony, or at least the site of a regular trading "fair", or a native Irish settlement that traded with Roman Britain, as Roman brooches and metalware in the style of Roman Britain were found nearby.

The site was acquired, reportedly for about €1 million, by Fingal County Council in 2017. In early 2018 they announced a Draft Conservation and Management Plan for consultation, including protection from further damage by motorbike scrambling, and integration into coastal walking paths. The purchase has raised hopes that the site will finally receive proper archaeological investigation, which will answer many of the questions that have been the subject of speculation for decades.

== Description ==
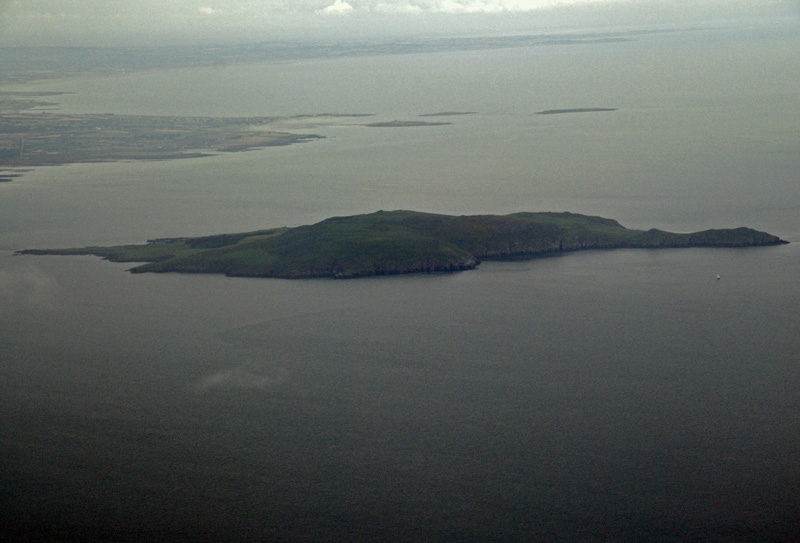
Lambay Island, just off the coast very close to Drumanagh. Some remains (Roman brooches and decorative metalware) were discovered on the island, which are thought to date to the 1st century AD. The nature of artefacts found there also demonstrated Romano-British trading.

The area is surrounded on three sides by the Irish Sea, forming a peninsula about 320 by 420 metres, covering some 12 hectares / 31 acres, defended across the neck of the headland by three parallel earth banks running some 350 metres, north–south and fairly straight, with ditches in front of them. With the cliffs around the other sides this gives a strong defensive position. It is possible that the earthworks are Bronze Age, as are the somewhat similar ones at Knock Dhu, County Antrim, or they may be Iron Age. They are in character with other Irish forts, including a number in the area. Within the ditches the headland is roughly rectangular, narrowing somewhat towards the sea, with the maximum distance from the ditches to the cliff not much more than 400 m. The Martello Tower is near the tip of the headland, about equidistant from the two sides.

The site is a Recorded Monument, protected under the Section 12 of the National Monuments (Amendment) Act, 1994, and by a Preservation Order placed on it in 1977. Although its archaeological importance has been known since the 1950s, when ploughing turned up sherds of Roman Samian ware, it has not been subject to archaeological excavation, but numerous artefacts have been dug up by illegal metal detectorists. One such collector attempted to sell a trove of Roman coins and ornaments at Sotheby's in London in the 1980s, which was impounded and deposited in the National Museum of Ireland. Since then, a legal dispute over ownership has prevented the artefacts and their provenance from being discussed publicly.

Discoveries of over 40 ingots of copper and brass, and the existence of copper mines in the area, at Loughshinny, suggest the site may have been a metalworking centre in the Iron Age.

== History ==
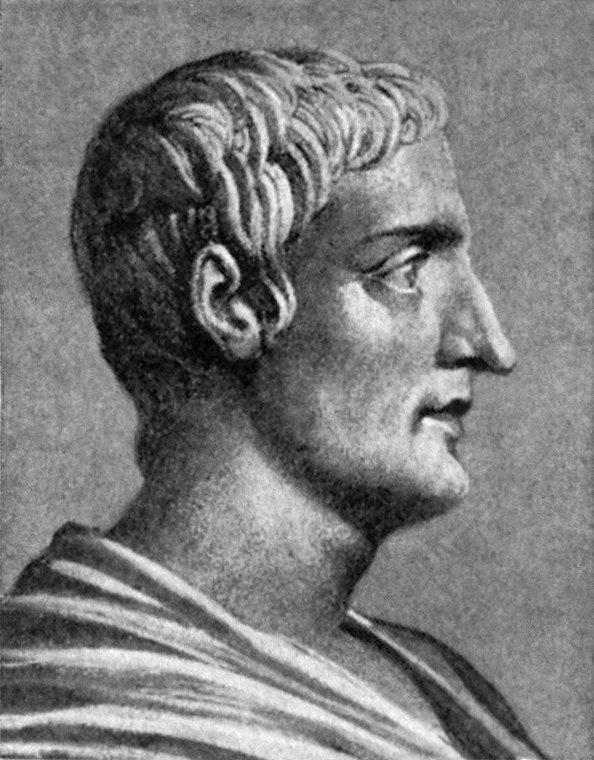
Tacitus wrote that the Roman general Agricola in 82 crossed the sea (of Ireland?) from western Britain and conquered "tribes unknown" to Romans.

Barry Raftery and Gabriel Cooney have suggested that the fort may have been used by Gnaeus Julius Agricola, then Roman governor of Britain, for an invasion of Ireland in AD 82. The Roman historian Tacitus mentions that Agricola entertained an exiled Irish prince, thinking to use him as a pretext for a possible conquest of Ireland. Agricola, says Tacitus, "crossed in the first ship" and defeated peoples unknown to the Romans until then. He does not specify which body of water he crossed, although many scholars believe it was the Clyde or Forth; however, the rest of the chapter exclusively concerns Ireland.

Agricola fortified the coast facing Ireland, and Tacitus recalls that his father-in-law often claimed the island could be conquered with a single legion and auxiliaries. This conquest never happened, but some historians believe that the crossing referred to was in fact a military expedition to Ireland.

Vittorio De Martino argues that there was continuous interaction between Roman Britain and Ireland. Professor Michael Herity of UCD stated that the quantity and nature of the material from the site, taken together with the structural evidence, suggest a rich Irish emporium, which traded extensively with the Roman world. Richard Warner suggests that Drumanagh may have been the bridgehead for an invasion of exiled Irish and British adventurers, who, with Roman support, carved out kingdoms for exiled Irish noblemen, and links this with the legend of Túathal Techtmar, who is said to have been exiled to Britain in the 1st or 2nd century, and returned with an army to seize the kingship. A group of burials on Lambay Island, just off the coast near Drumanagh, contained Roman brooches and decorative metalware of a style also found in Roman Britain from the late first century, and archaeological discoveries in other parts of Ireland, including Roman jewellery and coins at Tara and Clogher, support the possibility of a Roman invasion of Ireland.

== Archaeology ==
In May 2025, archaeologists from the Centre for Irish Cultural Heritage at Maynooth University in partnership with the Irish Archaeology Field School discovered the first intact Roman pot in Ireland during excavations at Drumanagh. The approximately 2,000-year-old ceramic vessel, described as a "textbook example" of a Roman pot, was unearthed in an undisturbed and well-preserved state.

== See also ==
- Hibernia
- Hiberno-Roman relations
- History of Ireland
- Tuathal Techtmar

== Bibliography ==
- Cooney, Gabriel. Ireland, the Romans and all that from Archaeology Ireland, Spring 1996.
- Di Martino, Vittorio. Roman Ireland, The Collins Press. London, 2003.
- Raftery, Barry. Pagan Celtic Ireland. Thames & Hudson Ltd. London, 1997
- "Understanding the monument": Drumanagh: Understanding the monument Consultation document for Fingal County Council, 2018, 22 page PDF
