= Jahbulon =

Word allegedly used in Royal Arch Masonry

Jahbulon or Jabulon or Jahbuhlun (supposedly from Hebrew: יָהּ בַּעַל אוֹן, romanized: Yāh baʿal ʾōn, "Jah-Baal-strength") is a word which historically was used, and is allegedly still used in some rituals of Royal Arch Masonry and derivations thereof.

== Background ==
Non-Masonic author, Stephen Knight, alleged that "Jahbulon" is a composite name for God, and even the name of a unique "Masonic god", despite Freemasonry's official claim that "There is no separate Masonic God," nor a separate proper name for a deity in any branch of Freemasonry. In England, no ritual containing the name has been in official Masonic use since February 1989.

== Usages ==
=== Masonic ===
According to Masonic historian Arturo de Hoyos, the word Jahbulon was first used in the 18th century in early French versions of the Royal Arch degree. It relates a Masonic allegory in which Jabulon was the name of an explorer living during the time of Solomon who discovered the ruins of an ancient temple. Within the ruins he found a gold plate upon which the name of God (YHWH) was engraved.

In Duncan's Masonic Ritual and Monitor, published in the mid-19th century, Malcolm Duncan uses the word as a recognition password in his rendition of the Royal Arch degree, (Note: "They then balance three times three, bringing the right hand with some violence down upon the left. The right hands are then raised above their heads, and the words, Jah-buh-lun, Jehovah, G-o-d, are given at low breath, each companion pronouncing the syllables or letters alternately" Royal Arch, Or Seventh Degree Duncan's Masonic Ritual and Monitor, by Malcolm C. Duncan, 1866) and in a footnote states that the word is a combination of sacred names. (Note: "JEHOVAH. Of the varieties of this sacred name in use among the different nations of the earth, three particularly merit the attention of Royal Arch Masons: 1. JAH. This name of God is found in the 68th Psalm, v. 4.; 2. BAAL OR BEL. This word signifies a lord, master, or possessor, and hence it was applied by many of the nations of the East to denote the Lord of all things, and the Master of the world.; 3. ON. This was the name by which JEHOVAH was worshipped among the Egyptians.; I have made these remarks on the three names of God in Chaldaic, Syriac and Egyptian, Baal, Jah, and On, in the expectation that my Royal Arch Companions will readily recognize them in a corrupted form.--Lexicon." From footnote 226:1 in Royal Arch, Or Seventh Degree "Duncan's Masonic Ritual and Monitor", by Malcolm C. Duncan, 1866) However, there has been controversy regarding Duncan's ritual. According to Turnbull, Everett and Denslow, Duncan has the candidate swear, "I furthermore promise and swear, that I will support the Constitution of the General Grand Royal Arch Chapter of the United States of America..." whereas the General Grand Chapter at the time styled itself General Grand Chapter of Royal Arch Masons of the United States, a subtle but significant difference. Some Masonic authors state that even if Duncan's ritual is authentic, it is either an outdated exposure or that it had been superseded by another explanation.

=== Ordo Templi Orientis ===
According to Francis X. King in The Secret Rituals of the O.T.O., the word is used in two rituals of Ordo Templi Orientis: the Lodge of Perfection, in which the candidate receives the Fourth Degree (which is called Perfect Magician and Companion of the Holy Royal Arch of Enoch); and the Perfect Initiate (or Prince of Jerusalem) degree, which falls between the fourth and fifth degrees. King prints in his book the lyrics of a song that mentions the word "Jahbulon."

== Interpretations ==
According to The Rev. Canon Richard Tydeman, in an address to the Supreme Grand Chapter of England on 13 November 1985, the word is a compound of three Hebrew terms:

- יהּ (Yah, I AM, which indicates eternal existence),
- בּעל (b'el, owner, husband, lord) and
- און (on, strength); pronouncing three aspects or qualities of Deity, namely Eternal Existence, Ownership, and Omnipotence and equating to "The Eternal God - Master - Almighty".

According to Walton Hannah, the word is a compound of the names of three gods worshipped in the ancient Middle East:

- Jah (= Yahweh)
- Baal
- On

According to Stephen Knight, each syllable of the 'ineffable name' represents one person of this trinity:

- JAH = Jahweh, the God of the Hebrews
- BUL = Baal, the ancient Canaanite fertility god associated with 'licentious rites of imitative magic'
- ON = Osiris, the Ancient Egyptian god of the underworld.

== Criticism ==
Much of the available material that discusses the word Jahbulon does not address the administrative and jurisdictional distinctions amongst the appendant bodies of Freemasonry. Royal Arch Masonry is an appendant body to Freemasonry. In some areas it forms part of the York Rite, and in others it is an independent body. To be eligible to join one must first be a Master Mason. The administration of the Royal Arch is entirely separate from the administration of Craft Freemasonry. Every Masonic organization is sovereign only in its own jurisdiction, and has no authority in any other jurisdiction. This means that there is no standardization whatsoever with regards to words, signs, grips, or any other Masonic secrets.

Walton Hannah stated in his book Darkness Visible that the interpretation that Jahbulon was a name for God reportedly disturbed Albert Pike, the Sovereign Grand Commander of the Southern Jurisdiction of the Scottish Rite, who, when he first heard the name, called it a "mongrel word" partly composed of an "appellation of the Devil".

Certain Christian ministries take the position that Jahbulon is the name of a Masonic Pagan god, and therefore violates the Biblical commandment "You shall have no other gods before me". A Church of England report into compatibility of Freemasonry and the Church reached conclusions of objection based on six points. One of these points was Knight's interpretation of Jahbulon; "JAHBULON, the name of description of God which appears in all the rituals is blasphemous because it is an amalgam of pagan deities. In effect, use of the term is taking God's name in vain."

== See also ==
- Magical formula
