= Loughshinny =

Village in north County Dublin, Ireland

Loughshinny Loch Sionnaigh (Irish)
- Village
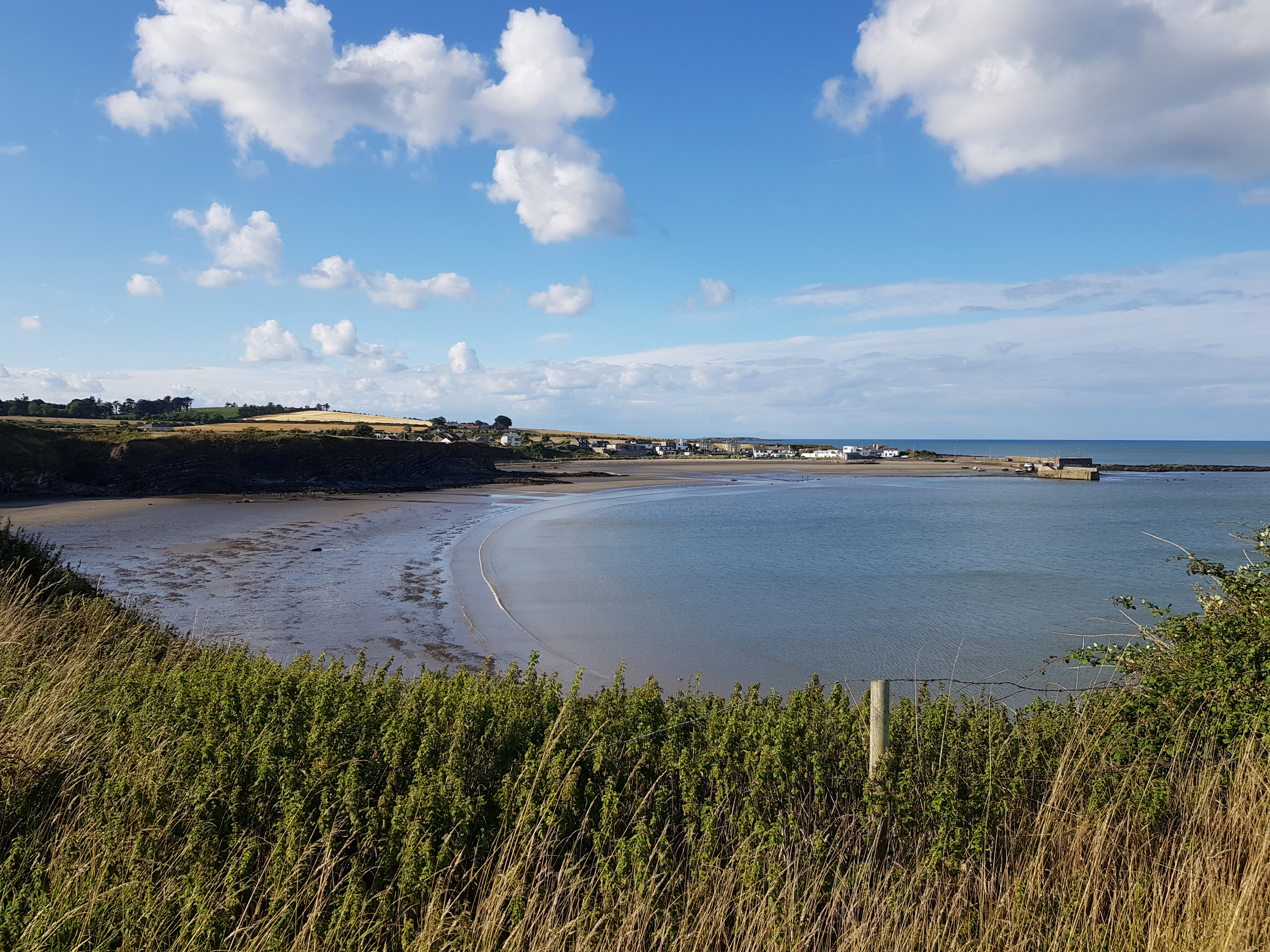
- Loughshinny viewed from Drumanagh Head

- Location in Ireland
- Coordinates: 53°32′49″N 6°5′10″W
- Country: Ireland
- Province: Leinster
- County: County Dublin
- Local government area: Fingal

Population (2022)
  - Total: 741
- Time zone: UTC+0 (WET)
  - Summer (DST): UTC-1 (IST (WEST))
- Website: www.loughshinnyvillage.com

Loughshinny (/lɒxˈʃɪni/ lokh-SHIN-ee; Irish: Loch Sionnaigh, meaning 'lake of the fox') is a small coastal village in northern County Dublin, Ireland, between Skerries and Rush. Loughshinny's more famous landmarks are the Martello Tower on the nearby headland of Drumanagh and some unusual rock formations visible on some of the many coastal walks in the area. The village is located in the townland of the same name which is part of the civil parish of Lusk.

== History ==
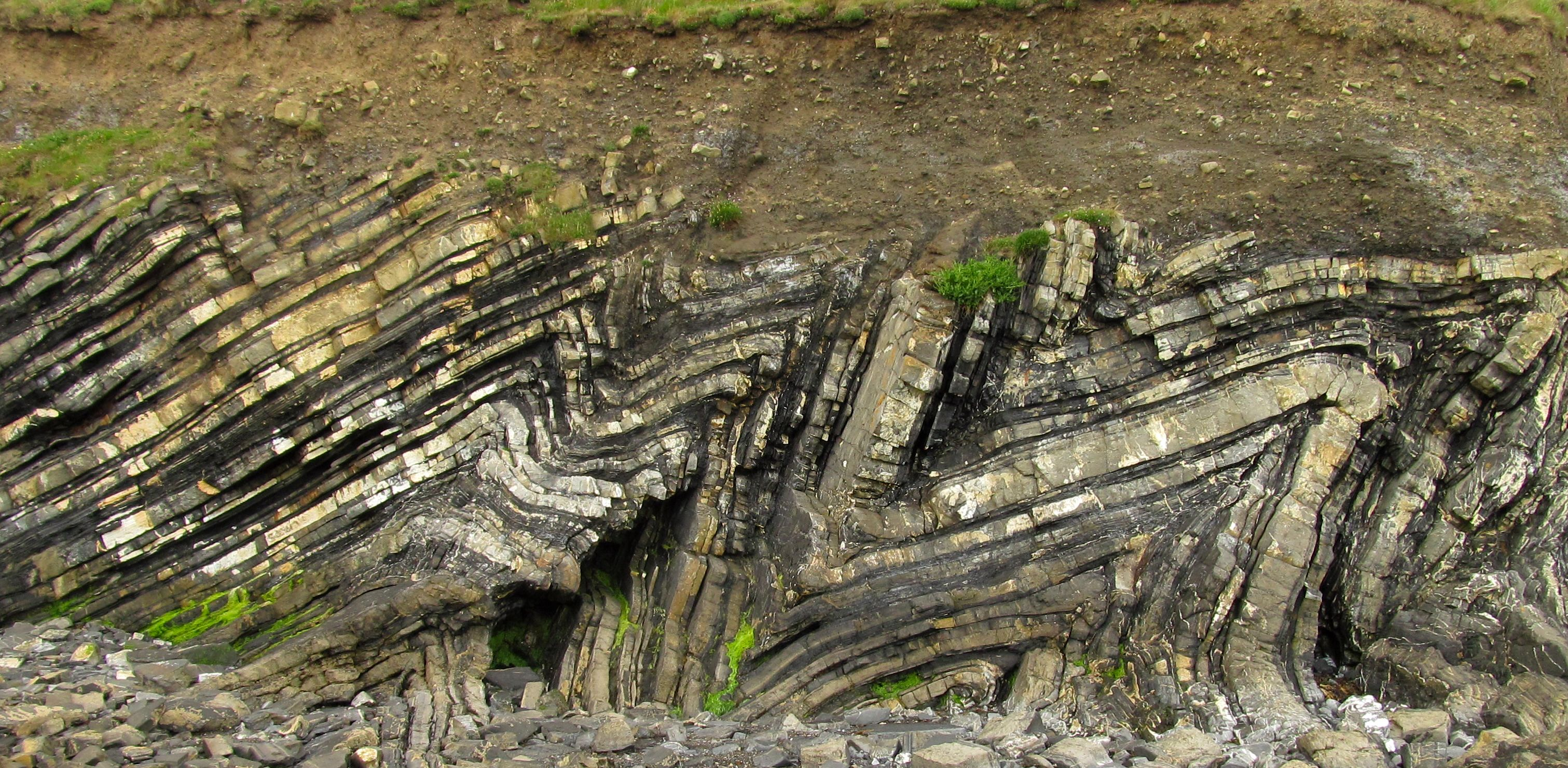
Folded sedimentary rocks of carboniferous age near Loughshinny

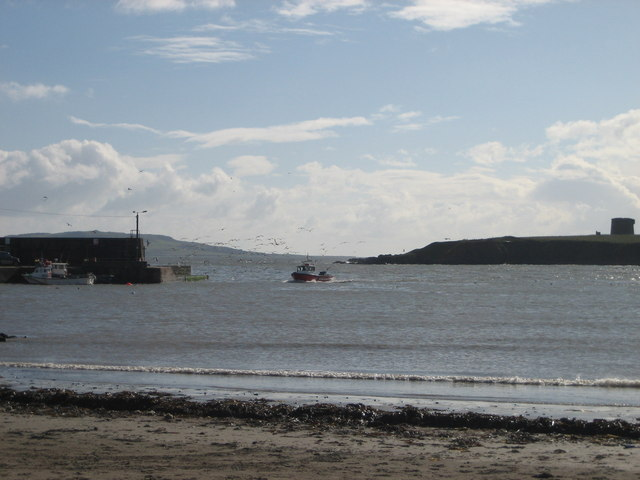
Loughshinny Harbour

The headland of Drumanagh contains a major Iron Age fort, where important Roman artefacts have been found. Some archaeologists have suggested the fort was a bridgehead for Roman military campaigns, while others suggest it was a Roman trading colony or a native Irish settlement that traded with Roman Britain.

Famous people associated with Loughshinny include Richard A. Butler, who was a member of the first Seanad and chair of the Irish Farmers' Union. Richard Delahide, Chief Justice of the Common Pleas for Ireland, who died in 1540, lived in Loughshinny.

== Loughshinny Beach ==
Loughshinny Beach has a picnic area, public toilets (summer only), a lifeguard hut (summer only), and a public carpark (year-round).

In April 2016, Loughshinny Beach was classified as having a "poor status" of water quality, along with Rush South Beach, by Fingal County Council. This statement was issued during one of Fingal County Council's largest pushes for tourism throughout the Fingal region and in Loughshinny. Also in 2016, Loughshinny Beach was one of six Irish beaches that failed to meet minimum EU standards for clean water. Rush South Beach similarly failed to meet these EU regulations. Tourism has suffered in these regions as a result, but the so-called "Folding Cliffs of Loughshinny" and the Smugglers' Cave along the beach nearby Loughshinny still provide an attraction for tourists.

On 12 July 2022 a 'do not swim' notice was issued for Loughshinny Beach due to high E.coli readings in the water believed to have been caused by contamination from dogs and other animals. Three days later the notice was lifted after a bathing water sample gave a result of ‘excellent’ water quality.

== See also ==
- List of towns and villages in Ireland
