= Lia Fáil (political party) =

Defunct Irish political party

- Founder: Father John Fahy
- Founded: 1 November 1957
- Dissolved: c.1961
- Headquarters: Lusmagh, Banagher, County Offaly, Ireland
- Ideology: Radical Populism, radical agrarianism, xenophobia, Jingoism, anti-Semitism, Irish nationalism, Anti-Communism
- Political position: Far Right

Lia Fáil (named after Lia Fáil, the "Stone of Destiny") was a minor nationalist political party and movement in Ireland during the 1950s and the early 1960s. It espoused an extremist far right populist agrarian ideology mostly driven by the party's founder and leader, Catholic priest Father John Fahy.

== Background ==
Lia Fáil was founded on 1 November 1957 in Lusmagh, County Offaly as the Ireland for the Irish Association with Father John Fahy named as President of the organisation. By 1958 it was positioning itself to be a national organisation, renamed itself Lia Fáil and elected a national executive headed up by Eamon Ginnell, with Fahy holding no official role so as to maintain plausible deniability about his involvement to his superiors in the Catholic Church. Father Fahy had an extensive background in radical politics; during the 1930s he spent considerable effort aiding and abetting the remnants of Irish Republican Army, and was associated with the Socialist Republican Peadar O'Donnell.

From the outset, the group had extremely radical goals: it sought to make it illegal for any foreigner to purchase land in Ireland, to confiscate any land purchased in Ireland by foreigners since the Easter Rising of 1916, to annul the Land Acts, and to redistribute land to the young men of Ireland.

Lia Fáil was somewhat of a "last gasp" of radical agrarianism in Ireland; the context of their formation was that Clann na Talmhan, the last of the "farmers' parties" to be represented in Dáil Éireann was on its last legs by 1957, having done poorly in the 1957 Irish general election, the penultimate election it would contest. While the dedicated farmers' party was wilting away, Fianna Fáil was undergoing a change. Fianna Fáil had traditionally supported small farmers and landholders and had many times through the 1930s and 1940s flirted with land division and even land redistribution. However, under new leader Seán Lemass, the party was developing a new outlook that focused more on industrialisation rather than agricultural reform.

== Newspaper and program ==
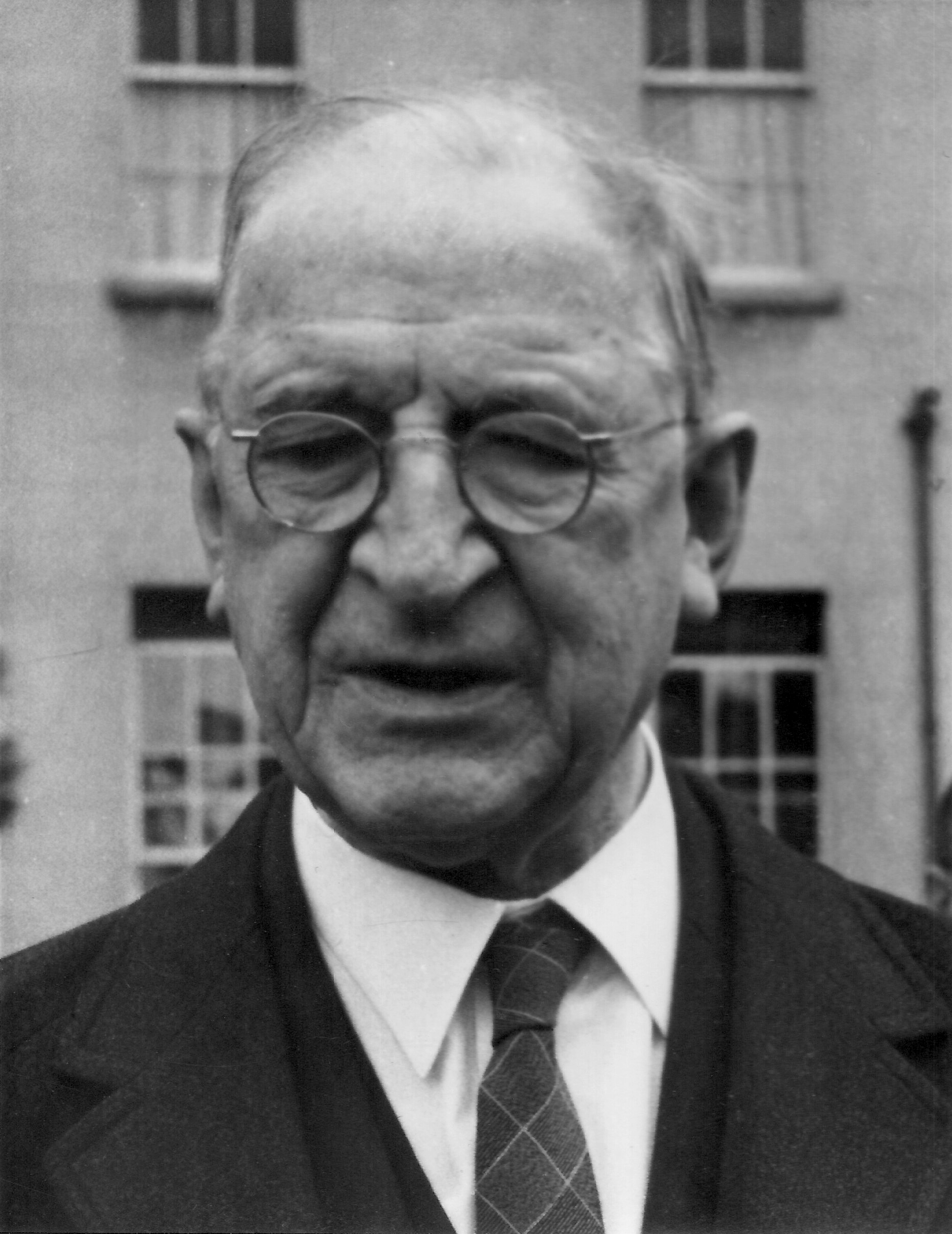
Éamon de Valera and his Fianna Fáil party were one of the numerous targets of Fahy and Lia Fáil's anger

To spread the message of Lia Fáil, Father Fahy began producing a party newspaper also named Lia Fáil. The various editions of the newspaper, mostly written exclusively by Fahy, expanded upon the goals and values of Lia Fáil. It also promised that if the party ever came to power it would: make emigration illegal, call on the Irish diaspora, that it would spend £10,000,000 on training an army to defeat "the British Empire" and to use this army to smash partition in Ireland within five years of coming to power. Fahy fantasied in the paper about an Irish air force using nuclear weapons to destroy Northern Ireland and the Orange Order. Jews, Freemasons and Protestants were frequently denounced in the newspaper. The Irish political establishment was not saved from the paper’s fury and in particular the ruling Fianna Fáil and Éamon de Valera were savaged in its articles. Consideration in the pages of the pages was also given to "Monetary Reform", the term the Monetary Reform Party used to describe its central plank of introducing social credit. The party paper also suggested that the party would reconstruct land use in Ireland to bring it back in line with the Brehon laws, which Fahy claimed had been supported and blessed by Saint Patrick as being in "perfect consonance" with Christian life as well as being in line with the vision of Michael Davitt, the radical 19th-century Irish agrarian.

In another edition of the Lia Fáil paper, a decidedly misogynistic view of women is taken. An article suggested that most of the modern ills of Ireland could be placed firmly on the shoulders of women. The article suggested unpatriotic men are brought about by mothers, sisters and partners incapable of "transmitting the right philosophy" because of their lesser intelligence. It suggested that this is because the women of Ireland had been corrupted with sinful sex obsessed English and American magazines. It also suggested that Irish women's obsession with these instruments of Anglo culture was what ensured the destruction of Gaelic culture.

In the same period of time as the party was being set up the IRA had launched another campaign, this one called the Border campaign. Lia Fáil supported the IRA in this and copies of the Lia Fáil newspaper were sent to IRA prisoners being kept in Curragh Camp military prison at that time.

During the 1959 Irish presidential election campaign Lia Fáil called on its followers to support Seán Mac Eoin over de Valera. The party gave 25 reasons for this position, with some of those reasons being that de Valera "was an alien" (de Valera had been born in the United States, but had been raised and living in Ireland since the age of 2), was a puppet of the British, that he was "the darling" of Protestants, Freemasons and the British Army, and that "his satanic lust for power motivates every act of his life". The paper’s reasons for supporting Mac Eoin were because he was "an honest-to-God Irishman of our own flesh and blood whose father and mother we know" and his military background.

The last issue of the Lia Fáil newspaper was published in September 1960. In it, the paper imagines a world where the Lia Fáil party has achieved its goals. In this world Lia Fáil has abolished the Oireachtas, drafted a new constitution, froze the banks, decoupled the Irish Punt from the British Pound, outlawed emigration, introduced mandatory military service, abolished both the Garda Siochána and the Civil Service and sent those former employees to work on the land alongside 500,000 other young men returned to Ireland from aboard. All members of Fianna Fáil, including de Valera, have been captured, tried, found guilty and sentenced to death, with their corpses left hanging in Dublin as a warning to others. Irish partition has ended, with Lia Fáil having destroyed the United Kingdom with a nuclear-armed airforce and nuclear-armed submarines.

The final issue also made wild claims including that "Ireland had the most masonic lodges per square mile in the world", that "Communists had sales in every county and 17 in Dublin", and that "Masonry was only the forerunner of Communism, working to make the gentile the slave of Jewish nations, in a world banishing Christianity".

== Direct action taken in the party's name ==
On 29 March 1958, an incident happened near Hollymount in rural County Mayo where members of Lia Fáil and a collection of small farmers attempted to divide up a 411-acre (1.7 km^{2}) estate amongst themselves, citing Lia Fáil gave them the authority to do so. When the matter went to the local courts, local papers reported that it had been Lia Fáil who had "led them astray".

== In the national headlines ==
In May 1959, a group of about five farmers near Banagher, County Offaly herded cattle off land being held by the Irish Land Commission and ploughed it to provided crops for a local widow. When the loose cattle were spotted by locals, the guards were called. When the Gardai arrived and attempted to return the cattle to now ploughed land, the farmers attempted to stop them. From there things escalated and by the end of the Gardai ended up arresting the farmers and taking them to Banagher's Garda station. When word of the arrest spread, a crowd of about 100 people gathered outside the Garda station. During this arrest, three men were allowed into the station on the pretence of delivering food and clothes for the prisoners. However, those three men helped the five farmers escape from their cell before running into the courtyard of the station, at which point the crowd helped the farmers escape. The Gardai, outnumbered, were unable to chase the escapees, who left in a van.

The incident featured in the headlines of national newspapers, and again so when two days after the escape, the five wanted farmers attended Mass at Father Fahey's church in view of the public. Highly embarrassed by the situation, the Garda Siochana moved to act decisively and a 50 officer raid took place on Father Fahy's home the next morning. Despite the raid being intended to be carried out in secrecy, someone tipped off the Daily Herald and a journalist and a photographer were sent to cover the raid as it happened. They were able to photograph the moment when Father Fahy, dressed in his dressing-gown, answered the door to the Gardai as they raided his home at 5 am. The Gardai searched the home for 10 minutes but found no one else there but Fahy's housekeeper.

Thanks to the dramatic photograph, the story made front page news in Ireland and was a major propaganda victory for Lia Fáil. Fahy was interviewed in these articles and denied housing the fugitives, but made clear he supported "the land war" now beginning. Some speculate that Fahy himself had been tipped off about the raid, given the speed in which he was able to turn the situation to his advantage.

When the matter was debated in Dáil Éireann, far-right politician Oliver J. Flanagan staunchly defended Fahy and criticised the Minister for Justice, Oscar Traynor, over his handling of the matter. Flanagan drew comparisons to anti-clerical oppression in China and Russia, much to the government's chagrin, while in the pages of the Lia Fáil newspaper Fahy compared the detectives who raided his home to the Black and Tans.

The farmers were all recaptured by the end of the month, and were brought before the local courts. Perhaps cognisant that the case was grabbing national headlines in the middle of a presidential campaign and a referendum on Proportional Representation, the judges elected to handle things with care and attempted to defuse the situation by offering leniency if the farmers would promise not to re-offend. Initially, the farmers refused to do so but after several adjournments and the matter being dragged out until November, they eventually relented, perhaps because in the meantime Lia Fáil's reputation in the public had considerably dropped.

== Protest against Erskine Childers ==
Sensing the unrest in Offaly, de Valera and Fianna Fáil arranged for the Minister of Land and Fisheries Erskine H. Childers to officially open an annual carnival in Banagher at the end of May. This infuriated Fahy, and he began distributing pamphlets denouncing Childers as a Freemason and a heretic (Childers was a member of the Church of Ireland). The denunciation backfired on Fahy and Lia Fáil: it served as a rallying call for local members of Fianna Fáil, who came to Childers' defence. The protest alienated the general public, as Childers was highly respected and had credible Republican credentials of his own, his father having died fighting for the anti-Treaty side in the Irish Civil War.

== Demise ==
Fahy had drawn national attention on to himself and Lia Fáil but following the Childers' protest, the support base was splintering. Furthermore, the party ended up being fined £1,000 by the courts in relation to a matter relating to the escaped farmers who damaged some property while on the run. Fahy's superiors in the Catholic Church moved to quell the whole affair, by July 1959 he had been forced to resign as Parish Priest by his bishop and moved to another parish, under command to no longer engage in politics. With the removal of Fahy, the debt hanging over them and their support fractured, Lia Fáil faded out of existence. Some of their last actions including unofficially running a candidate in the 1960 Irish local elections, which was not successful.

== See also ==
- An Ríoghacht
- Maria Duce
