= The Hibernian =

Defunct Irish magazine

- Cover of the final issue
- Editor: Gerry McGeough
- Categories: Faith
- Frequency: Monthly
- Founded: 2006
- First issue: May 2006
- Final issue: September 2008
- Country: Ireland
- Language: English; Irish
- Website: The Hibernian Magazine
- ISSN: 1649-8410

The Hibernian was a monthly Irish magazine with the subtitle "Faith, Family and Country". Twenty-nine issues were published between May 2006 and September 2008.

It was launched in May 2006, by Gerry McGeough, formerly a member of the Sinn Féin national executive, as editor, and Charles Byrne, a 28-year-old from Drogheda, who writes as "Cathal O Broin" (the Irish-language version of his name). Although similar in name, the magazine itself was never associated with the Ancient Order of Hibernians.

The magazine advocated a form of "faith and fatherland" nationalism which emphasised the persecution of Catholics in previous centuries and saw Irish identity as inseparably bound up with Catholicism. It often published articles on Irish history written from this perspective, as well as devotional articles and political/social comment. However, its publication was not without controversy and it was accused of being "a publicity vehicle for McGeough and the extreme right in Ireland".

Issue number 25 from May 2008 featured Declan Ganley of Libertas on the cover and carried an extensive interview with him.

The magazine regularly promoted the Tridentine Mass, often in a manner sympathetic to the Society of St. Pius X and to sedevacantists. It also promoted the activities of Fr. Nicholas Gruner, editor of the Fatima Crusader magazine, who accuses the Vatican of concealing the content of the Third Secret of Fatima.

It published numerous articles alleging that the international banking system is run by money-manipulating conspirators and advocating national and personal autarky. It also supported distributivism.

An article in the November 2007 issue refers to Cardinal John Henry Newman as a "sourpuss old Brit".

The final issue (September 2008) announced that the magazine was closing because of restrictions placed on McGeough as a result of his impending prosecution. The issue also includes an Irish-language prayer for the canonisation of Marcel Lefebvre, a profile of Deirdre Manifold (Galway-based author of Fatima and the Great Conspiracy) expounding her view that the Irish are "the Chosen Race of the New Testament", and an article advocating Young Earth creationism. The final article "Is it time to listen to heaven" by Joe O'Brien declares that the fate of the Hibernian shows "you cannot win against naturalism.. on a material level with political rallying, diplomatic maneuvring, or even military force... In order to defeat naturalism we must appeal to supernatural support".
