= George F. Dillon =

Irish missionary (1836–1893)

George Francis Dillon
- Born: 1836; Dublin, Ireland
- Died: 29 January 1893 (aged 56–57); Rome, Italy
- Education: All Hallows College, Dublin
- Occupations: Missionary, writer, theologian
- Writing career
- Subjects: Anti-Masonry, Our Lady of Good Counsel, Sacred Heart of Jesus, Irish history
- Notable works: War of Anti-Christ with the Church and Christian Civilization

George Francis Dillon (1836 – 29 January 1893) was a 19th-century Catholic missionary and writer from Ireland. He became well known in 1884 for having given conferences in Edinburgh about what he claimed to be a Masonic war against Christian civilisation. His speeches were later compiled with his best-known book, War of Anti-Christ with the Church and Christian Civilization. After being read a summary of this work, Pope Leo XIII approved it and funded the publication of an Italian version.

== Early life ==
Dillon was educated at All Hallows College in Dublin.

In 1861, he left Ireland to serve as a Catholic missionary in the Australian bush country, where he founded a mission for the aboriginal people at Burragorang, about 65 mi from Sydney.

Throughout his years in Australia, Dillon worked under the supervision of the Archbishop of Sydney. John Bede Polding was Archbishop of Sydney from 1842 to 1877, and Roger Vaughan (brother of Cardinal Herbert Vaughan) was Archbishop of Sydney from 1877 to 1883.

In his career as a Roman Catholic priest and missionary, Dillon served in several parishes in New South Wales, Australia. He served as a curate at St. Mary and Joseph's Cathedral, in St. Mary and St. Joseph's parish (Armidale), from November 1861 to August 1864. Next, he was transferred to the Sydney parish of Balmain, where it is known that he served from at least March 1868 to at least 1876. While there, Pope Pius IX commissioned him to undertake a special investigation, due to which he became authorised to use the title "Missionary Apostolic". After serving in Balmain, Dillon moved on to St. Paul's Catholic Church in the parish of Camden.

Dillon had a Doctor of Divinity degree, giving him license to teach Christian theology in Roman Catholic seminaries and universities.

== Journalism ==
In 1877, journalist and politician Joseph Graham O'Connor (1839–1913) had launched The Catholic Times, an Australian Catholic newspaper, in opposition to The Freeman's Journal. In 1880 Roger Vaughan, Archbishop of Sydney, bought The Catholic Times and changed its title to The Express. Vaughan and Dillon were co-editors of The Express, but the arrangement lasted for only a short time as Dillon moved to Rome, Italy, in 1882 because of ill-health. Journalist John Cyril Marie des Anges Weale (1857–1942) became a co-editor of The Express in 1883, but the newspaper soon failed, and O'Connor took it back in 1884, retaining only Weale as the editor.

== Later life ==
In 1884, Pope Leo XIII, in recognition of Dillon's services to the church, made him a "Monsignor" and gave him the title "Cameriere Segreto" (Secret Waiter). The title "Cameriere Segreto" made Dillon an official member of the "Famiglia Pontificia" (Pontifical Family). In his final years in Italy, Dillon was assisted by the Passionist Fathers with whom he had cultivated a great friendship.

According to his obituary in The Tablet (issue of 4 February 1893, p. 24) Dillon died on 29 January 1893 in the "Palazzo di Rossi" located in the Piazza d'Aracoeli in Rome, where he had lived for several years after moving to Italy. However, that may not be altogether correct, as research has not been able to locate a palazzo named "Palazzo di Rossi" in the Piazza d'Aracoeli.

Dillon openly denounced the known collaboration between the Bavarian Illuminati and the Freemasons and the alleged collaboration between Lord Palmerston and the Carbonari. He was also critical of the Alta Vendita document, Napoleon Bonaparte's supposed ties with the Masons and the secretive character of the Fenian organisation.

Generally, most of Dillon's other book releases dealt with religious topics, such as a book about the Virgin Mother of Good Counsel, the Sacred Heart of Jesus and a short piece on Irish history, specifically centred on Irish monasticism.

== Works ==
- 1870 Ireland: what she has done for religion and civilisation
- 1873 Sacred Heart of Jesus: a sermon preached at the solemn consecration of the Diocese of Maitland
- 1874 An Irish missionary in the Australian bush: his life, labours and death
- 1884 Virgin Mother of Good Counsel: A History of the Ancient Sanctuary of Our Lady of Good Counsel in Genazzano
- 1885 War of Anti-Christ with the Church and Christian Civilization

== Sources ==
=== Bibliography ===
- Kenny, John (1886). A History of the Commencement and Progress of Catholicity in Australia, Up to the Year 1840. F. Cunninghame & Co.
