= Maria Duce =

Catholic Integrist group in Ireland

Maria Duce (Latin for With Mary as our Leader) was a small Catholic Integrist group active in Ireland, founded in 1942 by Fr Denis Fahey.

== History ==
Like its founder, Maria Duce was avowedly anti-communist. Through their front organisation, 'Catholic Cinema and Theatre Patrons Association' (CCTPA), they picketed a visit by film star Danny Kaye and campaigned against visits by actor Gregory Peck and writer/director Orson Welles, all of whom they accused of being communists. Also, like its founder, the group espoused antisemitic views.

The group's principal aim was to embed Catholic doctrine in the legal structure of the Irish state, including recognition of the Catholic Church as the established church of Ireland, as it had been in Spain until 1931. This latter step had been contemplated during the drafting of Éamon de Valera's 1937 Constitution of Ireland, but it was ultimately rejected in recognition of the obstacle posed by Ireland's relatively large Protestant minority and due to aspirations for Irish unity and the detrimental effects such a clause would have on the unionist population in Northern Ireland. It did emphasise the "special position" of the church, with no specific legal entitlements.

Though Maria Duce's membership probably did not much exceed one hundred, its monthly journal Fiat enjoyed a fairly wide circulation in the late 1940s and early 1950s. The movement was not encouraged by the Irish bishops, who viewed its extremism with suspicion and desired not to become associated with Fr. Fahey's writings and statements. It was ordered to change its name by the Church authorities in 1955, a year after Fahey's death, by the Archbishop of Dublin, John Charles McQuaid (a former pupil of Fahey's and a fellow member of the Holy Ghost Fathers), in order to make it clear that it did not have official Church approval. As Fírinne [Irish for "truth"] it remained in existence until the early 1970s, publishing FIAT and organising pilgrimages to Fr. Fahey's grave in the belief that he would one day be canonised as a saint.

John Ryan, the long time editor of The Irish Catholic Newspaper, was secretary of Maria Duce for a time. The IRA member Sean South (killed in the 1950s border campaign) founded a local branch of Maria Duce in Limerick.

== See also ==
- Constitution of Ireland
- Fifth Amendment of the Constitution of Ireland
- Lia Fáil (political party)
- An Ríoghacht
