= The Prague Cemetery =

2010 novel by Umberto Eco

- Kindle edition
- Author: Umberto Eco
- Original title: Il cimitero di Praga
- Translator: Richard Dixon
- Language: Italian
- Genre: Historical novel, Mystery
- Publisher: Houghton Mifflin Harcourt (Eng. trans. USA); Harvill Secker (Eng. trans GB)
- Publication date: 2010
- Publication place: Italy
- English publication date: 8 November 2011
- Media type: Print (Hardcover)
- Pages: 437 pp. (hardcover edition)
- ISBN: 978-0547577531
- OCLC: 694829963

The Prague Cemetery (Italian: Il cimitero di Praga) is a novel by the Italian author Umberto Eco. It was first published in October 2010; the English translation by Richard Dixon was released the following year. Shortlisted for the Independent Foreign Fiction Prize in 2012, it has been described as Eco's best novel since The Name of the Rose.

== Plot summary ==
The main character is Simone Simonini, a man whom Eco claims he has tried to make into the most cynical and disagreeable character in all the history of literature (and who is the only fictional character in the novel). He was born in Turin in 1830. His mother died while he was still a child, and his father was killed in 1848 fighting for a united Italy. He is brought up by his grandfather, an old reactionary who houses Jesuit refugees and hates the Jews. He claims that the French Revolution was planned by the Knights Templar, the Bavarian Illuminati, and the Jacobins, but behind them all were the Jews. Since he does not attend public school, Simonini is educated by Jesuits brought into his home at the behest of his grandfather. One such priest, Father Bergamaschi (a fictionalized portrait of the Italian Jesuit novelist Antonio Bresciani), teaches him the evils of secret societies that, according to him, are no more than a cover for communism.

Simonini imbibes not only his grandfather's antisemitism but also his father's radicalism. His dislike of the Jews arouses his anti-clerical inclinations. In the works of French writers, such as Eugène Sue and Alexandre Dumas, he enjoys reading of intrigues and conspiracies, and he aspires to emulate these fictions in his own life.

Simonini studies law. After his grandfather's death, he is employed by a dishonest lawyer who teaches him the art of forgery. His skills bring him to the attention of the Piedmont Government secret service, who decide his skills might be useful to them. His first big coup is acting as an agent provocateur, betraying to the police a group of radical students who were his drinking buddies. In exchange, the secret service helps him betray his employer, who gets thrown into prison where he soon dies, and take over his business.

Giuseppe Garibaldi with his "Thousand" red shirts invades Sicily in 1860. Simonini is sent to Palermo as a spy to report on Garibaldi's movements after he has taken possession of the Island. While on this mission, Simonini discovers that, contrary to circulating rumours, Garibaldi's "Thousand" are students, independent artisans, and professionals, not peasants. The support given by Sicilian peasants is not a matter of patriotism, but of hatred of exploitative landlords and oppressive Neapolitan officials. Garibaldi himself has no interest in social revolution and instead sides with the Sicilian landlords against the rioting peasants. The Kingdom of Piedmont cautiously supports the unification of Italy but is worried that Garibaldi's fame might eclipse that of their king, Vittorio Emanuele, or worse still, that he might proclaim a republic.

He meets the French novelist Alexandre Dumas and Italian patriots Nino Bixio and Ippolito Nievo. Simonini is ordered to destroy some heavily guarded documents in Nievo's possession. He befriends Nievo to gain his confidence, but the papers are too closely guarded. The only way Simonini can think of is to blow up the ship on which Nievo is sailing—sending the papers, Nievo himself, and dozens of others to the deep. Simonini develops an elaborate scheme to smuggle aboard a deranged malcontent with a box of explosives and bribes a sailor to take part in the scheme, knowing that they would both be killed along with everybody else onboard. Simonini then stabs to death an accomplice on land who had provided the explosive to silence him.

However, Simonini's secret service employers are far from pleased. He has gone too far and greatly exceeded his brief, and the affair arouses suspicion and makes the government of the new United Italy look bad. Fortunately for Simonini, his employers are not as ruthless as he is. Rather than being permanently silenced, he is banished to Paris and given an introduction to the secret service of Emperor Napoleon the Third.

He arrives there in 1861, where the remainder of the story is set. He sets up business forging documents in rooms over a junk shop near Place Maubert. He also works for the French secret service as a forger and fixer. Over the next 35 years, he lays traps for revolutionaries fighting against Napoleon III, provides intelligence during the days of the Paris Commune, and forges the bordereau (slip) that would trigger the Dreyfus affair.

All of this earns Simonini enough to pay the bills and indulge his passion for fine food, but he wants to retire on a decent pension. He hatches a plan to forge what will one day become the infamous Protocols of the Elders of Zion, a document that claims the Jews were plotting world dominion. Simonini's idea is first inspired by an account of a Masonic gathering in Alexandre Dumas's novel Joseph Balsamo, and he gradually embroiders it using other sources, each inspired by the other: Osman Bey (Frederick van Millingen)'s The Conquest of the World by the Jews, Hippolytus Lutostansky's The Talmud and the Jews, Eugène Sue's Les Mystères du Peuple, Maurice Joly's The Dialogue in Hell Between Machiavelli and Montesquieu, and a novel called Biarritz by a Prussian secret agent called Hermann Goedsche, who used Sir John Retcliffe as a nom de plume.

Most of the novel is in the form of a diary written by Simone Simonini in 1897. He wakes up one morning to find he has lost his memory and suspects something terrible has happened. A few years earlier, at his regular eating place, Chez Magny, he had met a young doctor studying at the Salpêtrière Hospital whose name, he seems to recall, was "Froïde" ("or something like that"). Froïde had told him about the talking cure as a means of overcoming traumatic experiences. Simonini decides to write down all he can remember in the form of a diary, in the hope of regaining his memory.

Simonini works long hours on his life story, falling asleep through exhaustion or an excess of wine. Each time he wakes, he discovers that someone has been adding notes to his diary, a mysterious Abbé Dalla Piccola, who seems to know far too much about Simonini's life. Dalla Piccola has his own story to tell involving Palladism, Freemasonry, devil worship, and the Catholic Church, and introduces further historical characters, including Saint Thérèse of Lisieux, Yuliana Glinka, Pyotr Rachkovsky, Diana Vaughan, and one of the greatest hoaxers of the 19th century, Léo Taxil.

The peak of Simonini's career is composing what would become The Protocols of the Elders of Zion, refining and extending many earlier fabrications supposedly documenting a conspiratorial meeting for world domination which was said to have taken place at the Old Jewish Cemetery of Prague. (In fact, the earliest such document, which Simonini wrote back in his Italian days, depicted the conspirators as Jesuits rather than Jews.)

After this document is handed over to representatives of the Czar's Secret Police, they pressure Simonini to place a bomb in the newly dug tunnel of the Paris Metro, which could be blamed on "the Jews" and flesh out the assertions of the Protocols. Simonini obtains from an old Italian expatriate revolutionary living in Paris a powerful time bomb and instructions on how to use it—whereupon his diary is abruptly cut off. Presumably, Simonini blew himself up, though the omniscient narrator appearing in other parts of the book remains silent on this.

== Historical background ==
According to Eco, "the characters of this novel are not imaginary. Except the main character, they all lived in reality, including his grandfather, author of the mysterious message to abbot Barruel which gave rise to all modern anti-Semitism". Eco goes on to say:

The nineteenth century was full of monstrous and mysterious events: the mysterious death of Ippolito Nievo, the forgery of the Protocols of the Elders of Zion that inspired Hitler's extermination of the Jews, the Dreyfus affair and endless intrigue spun by the secret police of different countries, the Masons, Jesuit plots, and other events whose accuracy can't ever be authenticated, but that serve as fodder for feuilletons 150 years later.

Eco infuses the novel with other books as it explores the 19th-century novels that were plagiarized in the Protocols of Zion, and is structured like one. The spirit of the novel is Alexandre Dumas, in particular an intertextuality with his novel Joseph Balsamo (1846).

In several passages, various 19th-century antisemites use the term "Final Solution" as referring to the total extermination of all Jews, and also use the infamous term "Arbeit macht frei" which would appear on the gate of Auschwitz. After completing The Protocols of the Elders of Zion, Simonini speaks with certainty of the fact that this book would eventually lead to the extermination of the Jews—though it would happen after his lifetime and he would not have to do it himself. Such explicit anticipations of the Nazi-led Holocaust are an obvious anachronism, consciously and deliberately put in by Eco.

== See also ==
- Old Jewish Cemetery in Prague
