= Judeo-Masonic conspiracy theory =

Anti-Semitic and anti-Masonic conspiracy theory

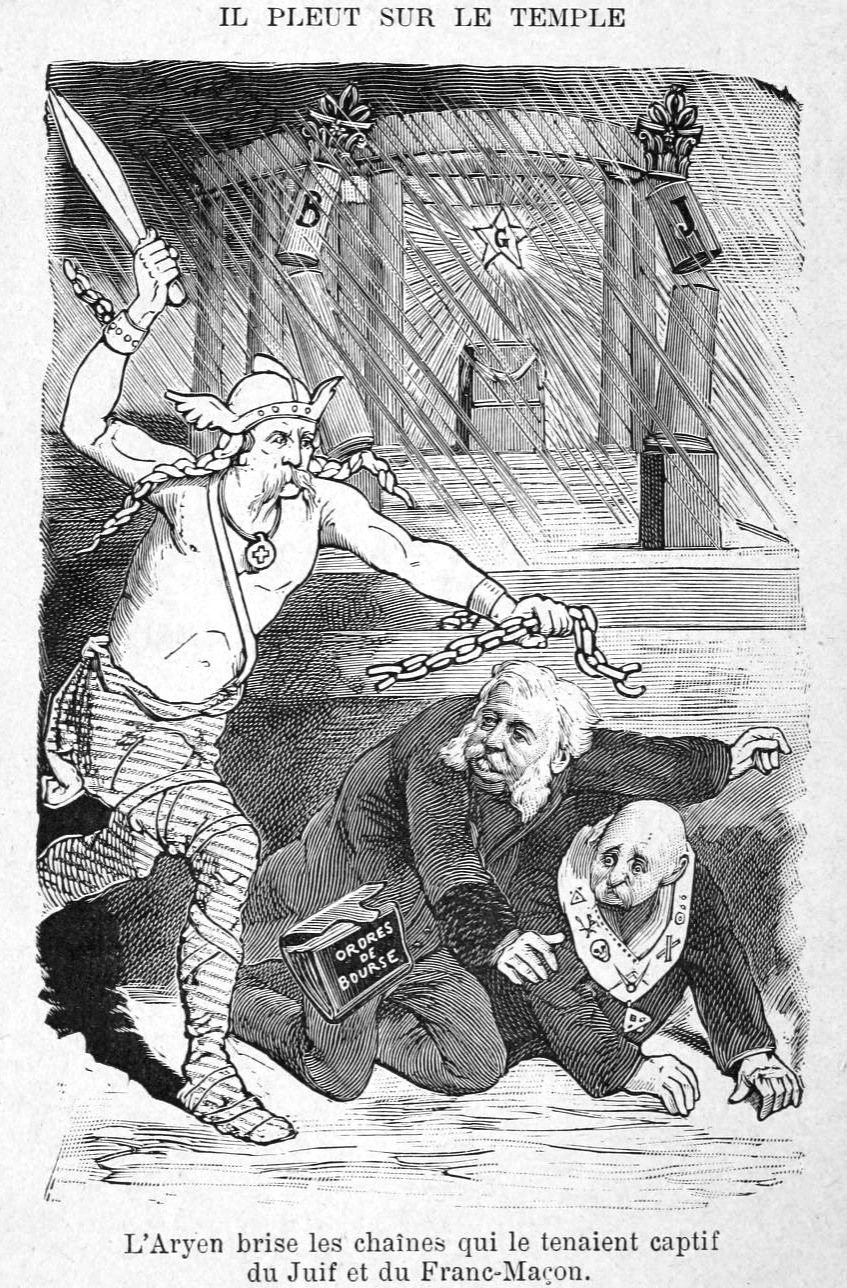
The Aryan breaks the chains of the Jew and the Freemason that held him captive, drawing of 1897 in a book by Augustin-Joseph Jacquet, in France

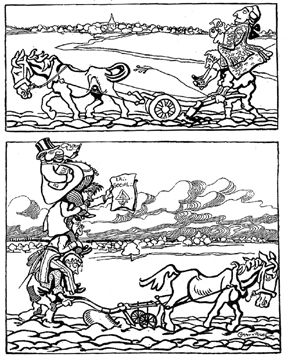
French Revolution: before and after: satirical drawing by French draftsman Caran d'Ache, 1898, in the middle of the Dreyfus affair and the foundation of Action Française. Although the Ancien Régime is not shown as idyllic, the contemporary situation is shown as an increase of oppression, which technical improvements (notice the plowshare) don't lighten, and to which financial capitalism (the banker with his top hat and his wallet), the Freemason (with his set square and plumb bob) and the Jew (with a curved nose) are contributors.

The Judeo-Masonic conspiracy is an antisemitic and anti-Masonic conspiracy theory involving an alleged secret coalition of Jews and Freemasons. Antisemitism blended after the French Revolution with anti-philosophe, anti-Masonic and anti-Illuminati conspiracy theories, particularly upon the dissemination of the Simonini letter by Augustin Barruel in 1806 and so the idea of the influence of Masons under Jewish domination found fertile ground among diverse European authors throughout the 19th century. These theories are popular on the far-right, with similar allegations still being published.

== The Protocols of the Elders of Zion ==
The Judeo-Masonic conspiracy theory merges two older strains of conspiracy claims: Masonic conspiracy theories claims and antisemitic conspiracy claims. It was heavily influenced by publication of The Protocols of the Elders of Zion, a fabricated document that appeared in the Russian Empire purporting to be an exposé of a worldwide Jewish conspiracy. The Protocols claim that the Jews had infiltrated Freemasonry and were using the fraternity to further their aims. Adherents of the Judeo-Masonic conspiracy took the claim made by the Protocols to extremes and claimed that the leaders of Freemasonry and the leaders of the Jewish plot were one and the same.

An example was the Spanish Roman Catholic priest Juan Tusquets Terrats, whose Orígenes de la revolución española and other works built on the Protocols, which he translated, to claim that Jews used Freemasons and communists to undermine Christian and Spanish civilisation, calling for an end to the Second Spanish Republic and providing a justification for the Francoist regime, which expanded the threat to an international Judeo-Masonic-Communist conspiracy (see also: Jewish Bolshevism).

== Conceptual influence ==
According to Danny Keren, a member of the Department of Computer Science at University of Haifa, the "conceptual inspiration" of the Protocols of the Elders of Zion was the 1797 treatise, Memoirs Illustrating the History of Jacobinism by the French priest Augustin Barruel, which claimed the Revolution was a Masonic-led conspiracy with the aim of overthrowing the moral teachings of the Catholic Church. According to Keren:

[I]n his treatise, Barruel did not himself blame the Jews, who were emancipated as a result of the Revolution. However, in 1806, Barruel circulated a fabricated letter, probably sent to him by members of the state police opposed to Napoleon Bonaparte's liberal policy toward the Jews, calling attention to the alleged part of the Jews in the conspiracy he had earlier attributed to the Masons. This myth of an international Jewish conspiracy reappeared later on in 19th century Europe in places such as Germany and Poland.

According to the Grand Lodge of British Columbia and Yukon website:

While it is both simplistic and specious to lay the responsibility for the French Revolution at the door of Freemasonry, there is no question that freemasons, as individuals, were active in building, and rebuilding, a new society. Considering the large number of bodies claiming masonic authority, many men identified today as freemasons were probably unaware of each other's masonic association and clearly cannot be seen as acting in concert. Yet they did share certain beliefs and ideals.

French Masonry of the time was exclusive, denying initiation to Jews and many other classes of people.

== Barry Domvile and The Link ==
Retired British Royal Navy admiral Barry Domvile, founder of British pro-Nazi association The Link, coined the title "Judmas" for the alleged Judeo-Masonic conspiracy. Domvile claimed that the "activities of Judmas are confined to a small section of both Jews and Masons: the large majority have no idea of the work undertaken behind the façade of Judmas." Domvile alleged that "the aim of these international Jews is a World state kept in subjection by the power of money, and working for its Jewish masters" and that "Masonry is the executive partner for the conduct of Jewish policy."

Domvile said that he first started thinking about a Jewish-Masonic theory as a result of Adolf Hitler. Domvile referred both to The Protocols of the Elders of Zion, and to The Secret Powers Behind Revolution by viscount Léon de Poncins. Domvile was aware that The Protocols of the Elders of Zion had been denounced as a forgery, but regarded their authorship as "immaterial".

== Post-Soviet Russia ==
The Judeo-Masonic conspiracy theories found new currency among the various marginal political forces in post-Soviet Russia, where widespread destitution created fertile ground for conspiracy theories, combined with blood libel and Holocaust denial. These viewpoints are also voiced by several antisemitic writers, notably by Oleg Platonov, Vadim Kozhinov and Grigory Klimov. An opinion poll conducted in Moscow circa 1990 has shown that 18% of Moscow residents believed that there is Zionist conspiracy against Russia and further 25% did not exclude such a possibility.

== Link to the Bilderberg group ==
Contemporary conspiracy theorists, who hew to theories centered on the Bilderberg Group and an alleged impending New World Order, often draw upon older concepts found in the Jewish-Masonic conspiracy theory, frequently blaming the Rothschild family or "international bankers". Because of the use of themes and tropes traditionally viewed as antisemitic, these contemporary conspiracy theorists tend to draw the ire of groups sensitive to antisemitic terminology, such as the Anti-Defamation League.

== In popular culture ==
The conspiracy is mentioned in Umberto Eco's novel The Prague Cemetery.

== Gallery ==
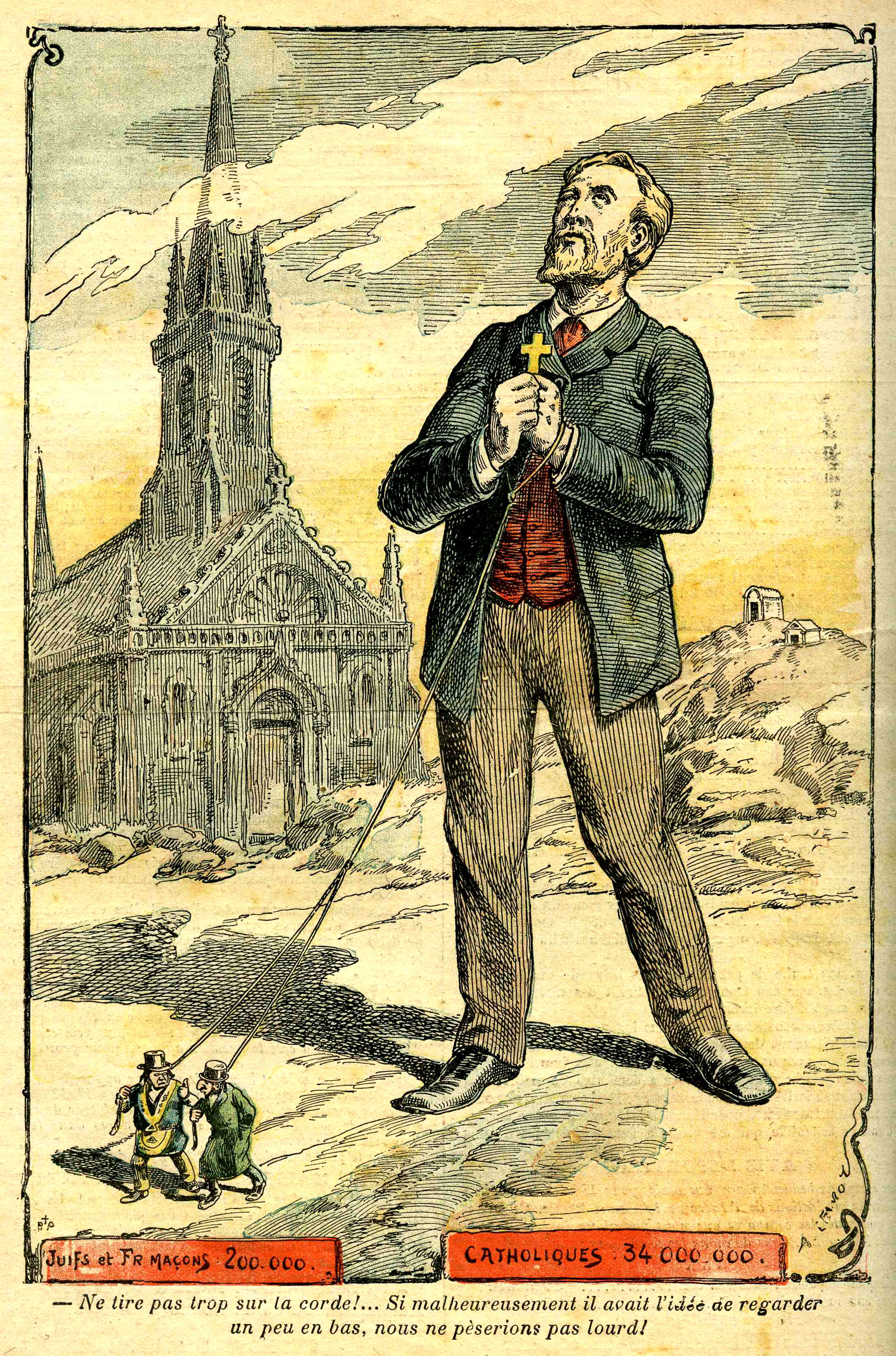
Catholic France driven by Jews and Freemasons. Drawing by Achille Lemot in Le Pèlerin, 1902.

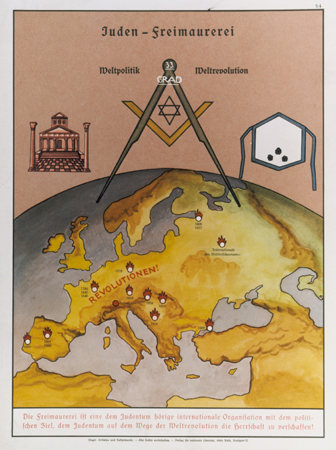
German poster from 1935, saying, "World politics – World revolution. Freemasonry is an international organisation beholden to Jewry with the political goal of establishing Jewish domination through world-wide revolution."

== See also ==
- Andinia Plan
- Anti-communism
- Anti-Marxism
- Anti-Masonry
- Antisemitic trope
- Antisemitism
- Cultural Marxism conspiracy theory
- Great Seal of the United States
- Jewish Bolshevism
- Synarchism
