= Emilio Mola =

Spanish military commander (1887–1937)

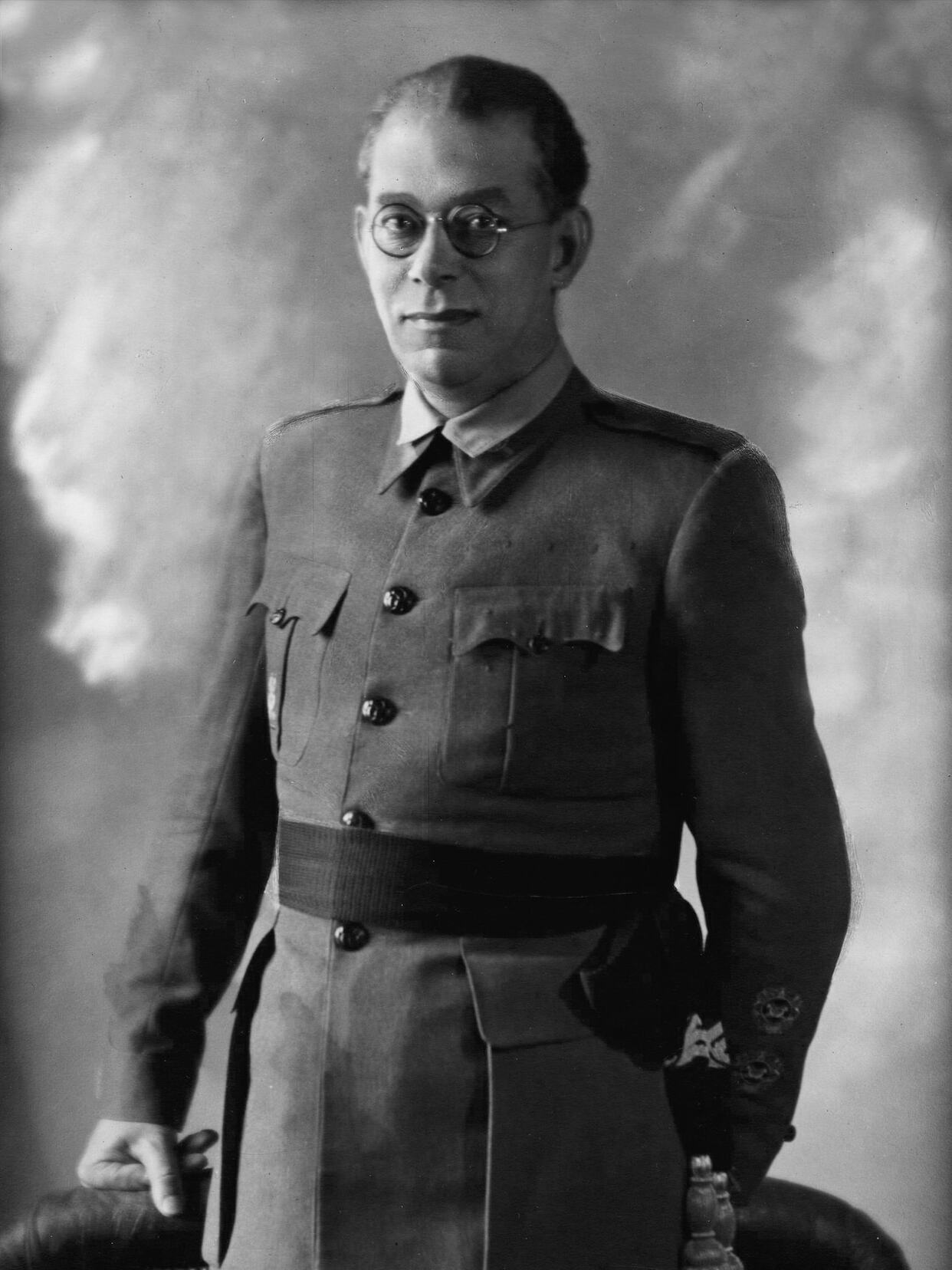
- Born: 9 July 1887; Placetas, Cuba, Kingdom of Spain
- Died: 3 June 1937 (aged 49); Alcocero, Burgos, Nationalist Spain
- Burial place: Pamplona Cemetery (1937–1961); Monument to the Fallen (1961–2016); Cremated (2016); 42.48328°N 1.38050°W
- Military career
- Allegiance: Kingdom of Spain (1904–1931); Spanish Republic (1931–1936); Nationalist Spain (1936–1937)
- Branch: Spanish Army
- Service years: 1904–1932; 1933–1937
- Rank: Brigadier General
- Nicknames: El Director (The Director)
- Commands: Military Governor of Navarre; Commander of the Army of the North
- Conflicts: Rif War; Spanish Civil War
- Awards: Military Medal; Laureate Cross of Saint Ferdinand

Emilio Mola y Vidal (9 July 1887 – 3 June 1937) was a Spanish military officer who was one of the three leaders of the revolt coup of July 1936 that started the Spanish Civil War.

After the death of José Sanjurjo on 20 July 1936, Mola commanded the Nationalists in the north of Spain, while Franco operated in the south. Attempting to take Madrid with his four columns, Mola praised local Nationalist sympathizers within the city as a "fifth column", possibly the first use of that phrase. He died in a plane crash in bad weather, leaving Franco as the pre-eminent Nationalist leader for the rest of the war. It was suspected that his death was a result of sabotage, although this has never been proven.

== Early life and career ==
Mola was born in Placetas, Cuba, at that time an overseas Spanish province, where his father, Emilio Mola López, a captain in the Civil Guard and noted as a harsh disciplinarian, was stationed. His mother, Ramona Vidal Caro, had been born in Cuba and was of Catalan origin. The Cuban War of Independence split his family; while his father served in the Spanish forces, his maternal uncle Leoncio Vidal was a leading revolutionary fighter. His family relocated to Girona in 1894, where he completed his primary and secondary schooling. In Spain, he enrolled in the Infantry Academy of Toledo in 1904. At the academy, he earned the nickname 'the Prussian' and graduated at the top of his class.

=== Early career and service in Africa ===
He was one of a group called Africanists (Spanish: Africanistas), who served in Spain's colonial war in Morocco, enforcing Spain's occupation, for which he received the Military Medal in 1909, and became an authority on military affairs. In 1911, seeking quicker promotion, Mola transferred to the Fuerzas Regulares Indígenas, a unit which had been created two months earlier by Dámaso Berenguer. He was wounded in action during the Kert campaign in May 1912 in the thigh and thus he was promoted to captain. He earned promotion to Major for bravery shown at the front in February 1914. After this promotion, he was briefly stationed in Barcelona, Santander, and Madrid, before returning to active service in Morocco. He received promotion by seniority to Lieutenant Colonel in 1921. In January 1922 in Ceuta, Mola married 28 year old María de la Consolacíon Bascón y Franco of Seville. He participated in the landing at Alhucemas which brought the Rif War to an end. He earned promotion by wartime merit to the rank of Colonel in February 1926. In October 1927, Mola was promoted to the rank of brigadier general on merit, receiving a second Military Medal and being made the military commander of Larache. His promotions received on the basis of wartime merit were challenged under the Second Republic. Mola's anti-semitism became evident as he and the other Africanistas assigned blame for the decline of Spain's empire, and the loss of Cuba and the Philippines in the Spanish-American war, to the Jews and the anti-semitic Judeo-Masonic-Communist conspiracy theory, the contuberno.

=== Director-General of Security ===
Mola was made Director-General of Security in 1930, the last man to hold this post under Alfonso XIII. He was chosen for the position because of his service under Berenguer, who at the time served as the head of a transitional government. Mola had, immediately before this appointment, been garrison commander at Larache, and took the Director-General appointment reluctantly as it interrupted his career in the military. This was a political post and his conservative views made him unpopular with opposition liberal and socialist politicians.

=== Career in the Second Republic ===
Upon the proclamation of the Second Republic on 14 April 1931, a mob descended on Mola's house with the intention of burning it, but were prevented from doing so by militants of the Federación de Juventudes Socialistas. Mola believed he would be arrested for his suppression of what had been, until then, the Republican opposition, and went into hiding at the Toledo estate of an aristocratic acquaintance of his. On 21 April 1931, Mola surrendered himself to Manuel Azaña, the Minster of War, and swore an oath of loyalty to the Republic. Despite this, Mola was arrested and indicted for 'criminal negligence' in his decisions to repress Republican opposition during his time as Director-General of Security. On 3 July, Mola was released, but was rearrested the following day on the orders of the new Director-General of Security, Ángel Galarza. On 5 August, with his wife pregnant with their fourth child, Mola's imprisonment was commuted to house arrest on the order of Azaña. He was eventually exonerated by the Tribunal Supremo. Following Azaña's military reforms, Mola's ranking on the Army seniority list was reduced, and on 10 August 1932 he was placed in the Second Reserve, his seniority dropping from number 10 on the list of brigadier generals to number 240 on the list of the Second Reserve. During his time following this in which he had no military posting, Mola took up the hobby of making wooden toys, and in three weeks wrote a chess manual under the pseudonym W. Hooper despite his not actually being a chess player but instead basing the book on his reading of other chess manuals. The book sold many copies, especially in South America, and earned him a good deal of money. He also wrote three volumes of memoirs in which he criticised the government of Azaña and made polemical attacks against Freemasons and Jews based in part on his reading of the writings of Juan Tusquets Terrats and the Protocols of the Elders of Zion.

As a result of the amnesty introduced by the government of Alejandro Lerroux, Mola was able to return to active military service in April 1934. With the ascension of José María Gil-Robles to the post of Minister of War and the promotion of Francisco Franco to the role of Chief of the General Staff, Mola was made the military commander of Melilla in the summer of 1935, and then the commander of all Spanish troops in Morocco by the end of the year.

When the left-wing Popular Front government was elected in February 1936, Mola was made commander of the Pamplona garrison, since the government regarded Navarre as a backwater region. In reality, the area was a center of Carlist activity, and Mola himself secretly collaborated with the movement. He worked with elements of the right-wing Spanish Military Union and by the end of April 1936 was acknowledged as its leader in north-central Spain. When he left Morocco to take up his new posting on 4 March 1936, Mola transferred leadership of the July rebellion in Morocco to Lieutenant Colonel Juan Yagüe, who was then the commander of the Legion in Ceuta. In the months preceding the outbreak of the Spanish Civil War, Mola wrote his memoirs of his time in Africa, Dar Akobba, which historian Paul Preston said that based off the book being replete with violent close descriptions of fighting and mutilation suggested that Mola "had been utterly brutalized" by his experiences of war.

== July Rebellion and Civil War ==
Mola emerged as the chief planner among the plotters. While General José Sanjurjo, in exile in Portugal, remained the recognized leader, Mola was delegated the authority within the organization to plan operations in Spain. On 3 March 1936, Mola wrote a letter to Sanjuro in which he committed his unconditional loyalty and said he would not involve himself in any coup attempts unless at Sanjurjo's orders. Known as "the Director", Mola sent secret instructions to the various military units to be involved in the uprising and worked out a detailed plan for a post-coup government. In a memorandum dated 5 June 1936, Mola envisioned a "republican dictatorship" based on the Portuguese model. The initial government would consist of a "directory" that would oversee a semi-pluralist but authoritarian state. According to Mola: "The Directory will guarantee no change in the republican regime during its administration, with no change in any worker claims that have been legally obtained" but would "create a strong and disciplined state". The 1931 constitution would be suspended and new elections would be held. Certain liberal elements, such as separation of church and state and freedom of worship, were to be maintained. Agrarian issues were to be resolved by regional commissions with the aim of developing small holdings, but allowing for collective cultivation in some circumstances.

Despite extensive planning, Mola apparently doubted the chances for the coup's success. His dim view of the capabilities of monarchist militias and the conservative Catholic party Spanish Confederation of the Autonomous Right (CEDA), as well as only limited support from the fascist Falange, led him as late as 9 July to consider the possibility of having to flee to France if it failed. Mola developed a provisional agreement with José Antonio Primo de Rivera which specified that, in the rebellion, no more than a third of forces of the Falange in any specific area were to come under the direction of the Army.

In advance of the launch of the coup, Mola resettled his wife and four children to Biarritz, sponsored by the Spanish financier Juan March.

Mola originally planned for the coup to take place on 20 June 1936, but this was made untenable due to lack of confirmed support. After several delays, 18 July 1936 was chosen as the date of the coup. Francisco Franco's participation was not confirmed until early July. Although events ran ahead of schedule in the Spanish Protectorate of Morocco, Mola waited until 19 July to proclaim the revolt, making the proclamation in Pamplona at dawn. When Mola's brother Ramón, an infantry captain, was captured by the Republicans in Barcelona, the government threatened his life. Mola replied: "No, he knows how to die as an officer. I can neither take back my word to my followers and probably you cannot either from yours." The brother ended up committing suicide. Mola then ordered systematic executions in captured cities to instill fear. More than 40,000 were killed, overseen by Mola. One tenth of all Popular Front voters were summarily executed in the Navarre province under the direction of Mola. He famously declared:

... we must extend the terror; we must impose the impression of dominion while eliminating without scruples everyone who does not think as we do (Spanish: eliminando sin escrúpulos a todos los que no piensen como nosotros).

The Nationalist coup failed to gain control of Madrid and other urban areas, although most of the armed forces had supported it. Stressed by his needing to manage the contradictory demands of differing factions in the rebellion, Mola drafted an application to retire from the military and contemplated moving to Cuba. On 19 July, Mola received a call at 2am from Republican Prime Minister Diego Martínez Barrio in which he was offered a position in cabinet if he withdrew from the rebellion, an offer which Mola refused. As the situation devolved into civil war, Sanjurjo was killed in an air crash on 20 July. Mola then became Nationalist commander in the north, while Franco became commander in the south. With the death of Sanjurjo, Mola established a multi-member governing body for the so-called "Nationalist zone" (zona nacional) called the National Defense Junta. Based in Burgos, it was nominally headed by Miguel Cabanellas, the most senior participating general. Mola did not admit Franco as a member of the Junta until 3 August.

On 31 July 1936, Mola gave the first of multiple radio addresses made from Radio Pamplona, saying "I could take advantage of our present favourable circumstances to offer the enemy some negotiated settlement, but I do not want to. I want to defeat them to impose my, and your, will upon them and to annihilate them. I want Marxism and the red flag of communism to be remembered in history as a nightmare but as a nightmare that has been washed clean by the blood of patriots." On 18 August, in a conversation with General José Millán-Astray, Mola said "At this point in the war, I have opted for war without quarter. Those who have taken up arms against us, against the army, shoot them. If I saw my father in the enemy ranks, I would shoot him myself."

On 5 September a Nationalist offensive sent by General Mola under Colonel Alfonso Beorlegui took Irún and closed the French border. Mola's forces went on to secure the whole of the province of Guipúzcoa, isolating the remaining Republican provinces in the north.

A junta in Burgos proved unable to set overall strategy; thus, Franco was chosen commander-in-chief at a meeting of ranking generals on 21 September. Mola continued to command the Army of the North and led an unsuccessful effort to take Madrid in October. In a radio address, he described Nationalist sympathizers in the city as a "fifth column" that supplemented his four military columns. The Republican government then proceeded to carry out the mass execution of as many as 2,000 suspected civilian and military supporters of the Nationalists. What was later known as the Paracuellos massacres crushed any potential fifth column.

Mola clashed with German Condor Legion commanders Wolfram von Richtofen and Hugo Sperrle over the conduct of the war in the North, particularly over Mola's desire to bomb industrial targets in Bilbao and to destroy the country's industrial proletariat. Mola was involved in planning to hide responsibility for the bombing of Guernica.

Mola was noted as differing from Franco in that he refused interviews with the press frequently, earning the nickname 'el general invisible', and took few precautions with his security, travelling by car without an escort and having no security arrangements at his headquarters.

== Death ==
Mola died on 3 June 1937, when the Airspeed Envoy twin-engined aircraft in which he was travelling flew into the side of a mountain in bad weather while returning to Vitoria. The death of Mola, and the prior deaths of Sanjurjo, Joaquín Fanjul, and Manuel Goded Llopis left Franco as the pre-eminent leader of the Nationalist cause. In the assessment of historian Stanley Payne, Mola had been "the only subordinate capable of talking back to Franco." Adolf Hitler said of Mola, "The real tragedy for Spain was the death of Mola. There was the real brain, the real leader." Although there have always been accusations that Franco arranged the deaths of his two rivals, so far no evidence has been produced. Wilhelm Faupel, the German ambassador, reported that after the death of Mola Franco " undoubtedly feels relieved by the death of General Mola. He told me recently 'Mola was a stubborn fellow, and when I gave him directives which differed from his own proposals, he often asked me "Don't you trust my leadership any more?"'" Following Mola's death, Franco ordered his papers to be confiscated.

In 1948, Franco, as Caudillo of the recently re-established Kingdom of Spain, posthumously granted Mola the title of Duke of Mola and Grandee of Spain. The title was immediately assumed by his son, Don Emilio Mola y Bascón. It was abolished in October 2022, under the purview of the Democratic Memory Law.

== See also ==
- Desaparecidos del franquismo
- Fifth column
- Mohamed Meziane
- White Terror (Spain)

== Sources ==
- Payne, Stanley G. (2012). The Spanish Civil War. Cambridge University Press. ISBN 978-0-521-17470-1.
- Payne, Stanley G.; Palacios, Jesús (2018). Franco: A Personal and Political Biography (4th ed.). University of Wisconsin Press. ISBN 978-0-299-30214-6.
- Preston, Paul (2023). Architects of Terror: Paranoia, Conspiracy, and Anti-Semitism in Franco's Spain. London, UK: William Collins. ISBN 978-0-00-852212-4.

Spanish nobility
| Preceded by New creation | Duke of Mola; 1948 | Succeeded by Emilio Mola Bascón |
