= John Robison (physicist) =

Scottish physicist and mathematician (1739–1805)

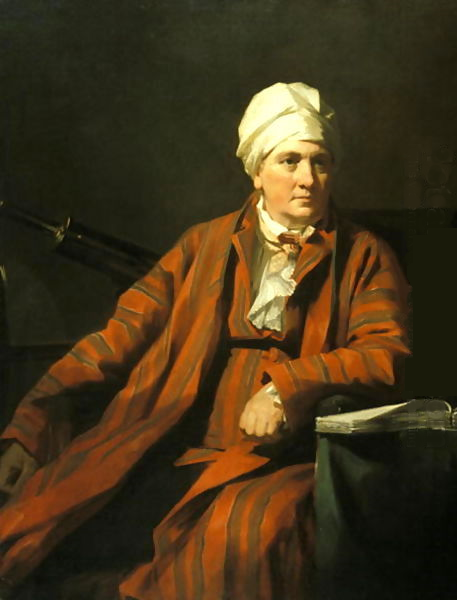
- Robison in 1798
- Born: 4 February 1739; Boghall, Baldernock, Stirlingshire, Scotland
- Died: 30 January 1805 (aged 65)
- Education: Glasgow University
- Scientific career
- Fields: Physics, Mathematics, Chemistry
- Workplaces: Glasgow University, Edinburgh University

Notes
- Residential Member of the Edinburgh Philosophical Society; Fellow of the Royal Society of Edinburgh (1783); Member of the Glasgow Literary Society

John Robison FRSE (4 February 1739 – 30 January 1805) was a Scottish physicist and mathematician. He was a professor of natural philosophy (the precursor of natural science) at the University of Edinburgh.

A member of the Edinburgh Philosophical Society when it received its royal warrant, he was appointed as the first general secretary to the Royal Society of Edinburgh (1783–98). Robison invented the siren and also worked with James Watt on an early steam car. Following the French Revolution, Robison became disenchanted with elements of the Enlightenment. He authored Proofs of a Conspiracy in 1797—a polemic accusing Freemasonry of being infiltrated by Weishaupt's Order of the Illuminati. His son was the inventor Sir John Robison (1778–1843).

== Biography ==
The son of John Robison, a Glasgow merchant, he was born in Boghall, Baldernock, Stirlingshire (now East Dunbartonshire) and attended Glasgow Grammar School and the University of Glasgow (MA 1756). After a brief stay in London in 1758 Robison became the tutor to the midshipman son of Admiral Knowles, sailing with the Royal Navy on General Wolfe's expedition to Quebec and Portugal (1756–62). His mathematical skills were employed in navigation and surveying. Returning to Britain in 1762, he joined the Board of Longitude — a team of scientists who tested John Harrison's marine chronometer on a voyage to Jamaica.

Subsequently, he settled in Glasgow engaging in the practical science of James Watt and Joseph Black in opposition to the systematic continental European chemistry of Antoine Lavoisier and its adherents such as Joseph Priestley. In 1766 he succeeded Black as Professor of Chemistry at the University of Glasgow. He in turn was succeeded in 1770 by Black's assistant, William Irvine.

In 1769, he announced that balls with like electrical charges repel each other with a force that varies as the inverse-square of the distance between them, anticipating Coulomb's law of 1785.

In 1770 he travelled to Saint Petersburg as the secretary of Admiral Charles Knowles, where he taught mathematics to the cadets at the Naval Academy at Kronstadt, obtaining a double salary and the rank of lieutenant colonel. Robison moved to Scotland in 1773 and took up the post of Professor of natural philosophy at the University of Edinburgh. He lectured on mechanics, hydrostatics, astronomy, optics, electricity and magnetism. His conception of mechanical philosophy' became influential in nineteenth-century British physics. His name appears in the 1776 "Minute Book of The Poker Club", a crucible of the Scottish Enlightenment. In 1783 he became General Secretary of the Royal Society of Edinburgh and in 1797 his articles for the Encyclopædia Britannica gave a good account of the scientific, mathematical and technological knowledge of the day. He also prepared for publication, in 1799, the chemical lectures of his friend and mentor, Joseph Black.

Robison worked with James Watt on an early steam car. This project came to nothing and has no direct connection to Watt's later improvement of the Newcomen steam engine. He along with Joseph Black and others gave evidence about Watt's originality and their own lack of connection to his key idea of the Separate Condenser.

Robison did however invent the siren, though it was Charles Cagniard de la Tour who named it after producing an improved model.

== Proofs of a Conspiracy ==
Towards the end of his life, he became an enthusiastic conspiracy theorist, publishing Proofs of a Conspiracy in 1797, alleging clandestine intrigue by the Illuminati and Freemasons (the work's full title was Proofs of a Conspiracy against all the Religions and Governments of Europe, carried on in the secret meetings of Freemasons, Illuminati and Reading Societies). The secret agent monk, Alexander Horn provided much of the material for Robison's allegations. French priest Abbé Barruel independently developed similar views that the Illuminati had infiltrated Continental Freemasonry, leading to the excesses of the French Revolution. In 1798, the Reverend G. W. Snyder sent Robison's book to George Washington for his thoughts on the subject in which he replied to him in a letter:

It was not my intention to doubt that, the Doctrines of the Illuminati, and principles of Jacobinism had not spread in the United States. On the contrary, no one is more truly satisfied of this fact than I am. The idea that I meant to convey, was, that I did not believe that the Lodges of Free Masons in this Country had, as Societies, endeavoured to propagate the diabolical tenets of the first, or pernicious principles of the latter (if they are susceptible of separation). That Individuals of them may have done it, or that the founder, or instrument employed to found, the Democratic Societies in the United States, may have had these objects; and actually had a separation of the People from their Government in view, is too evident to be questioned.

== Works ==
- Outlines of Mechanical philosophy: Containing the Heads of a Course of Lectures, Edinburgh, William Creech, 1781.
- Outlines of a Course of Experimental Philosophy, Edinburgh, William Creech, 1784.
- Outlines of a Course of Lectures on Mechanical Philosophy, Edinburgh, J. Brown, 1803.
- Elements of Mechanical Philosophy: Being the Substance of a Course of Lectures on that Science, Edinburgh, Archibald Constable, 1804.
- Robison contributed well over forty articles to the third edition of the Encyclopædia Britannica (1797) and its supplement, including: Resistance of Fluids, Roof, Running of Rivers, Seamanship, Telescope and Water-works.
- A System of Mechanical Philosophy,

=== Proofs of a Conspiracy, reprints and related documents ===
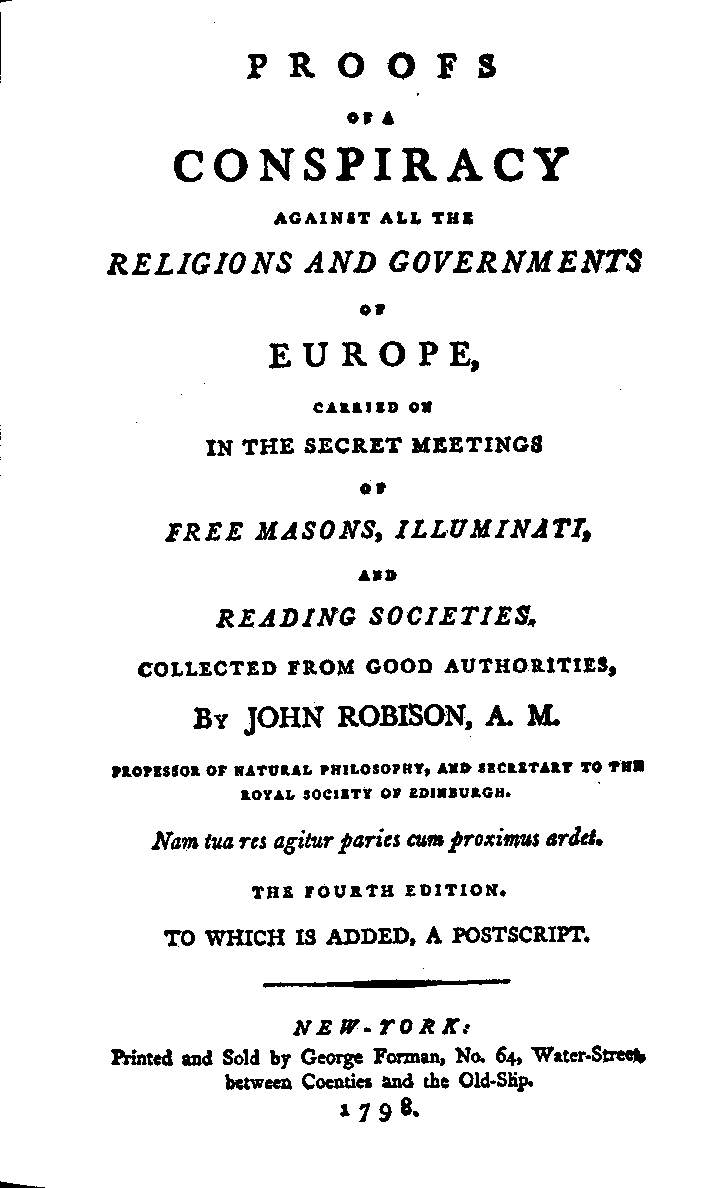
First Page of John Robison's Proofs of a Conspiracy Against all the Religions and Governments of Europe (1798)

- Proofs of a Conspiracy against all the Religions and Governments of Europe, carried on in the Secret Meetings of Free-Masons, Illuminati and Reading Societies, etc., collected from good authorities, Edinburgh, 1797; 2nd ed. London, T. Cadell & W. Davies, 1797 with a Postscript; 3rd ed. with Postscript, Philadelphia, T. Dobson & W. Cobbet, 1798; 4th ed., G. Forman, New York, 1798; Dublin 1798; Proofs of a Conspiracy, Western Islands, 1900; The Illuminati, taken from "Proofs of a world conspiracy", Elizabeth Knauss [1930]; Proof's [sic!] of a Conspiracy, Ram Reprints, 1964; Proofs of a conspiracy, Boston, Western Islands, "The Americanist Classics", [1967]; Proofs of a Conspiracy, Islands Press, 1978; C P a Book Pub, 2002 ISBN 0-944379-69-9 ; Kessinger Publishing, 2003 ISBN 0-7661-8124-3; annotated 5th ed. with foreword by Alex Kurtagic, Proofs of a Conspiracy, The Palingenesis Project (Wermod and Wermod Publishing Group), 2014 ISBN 978-1-909606-03-6; annotated 6th ed., "Proofs of a Conspiracy," Spradabach Publishing, 2022 ISBN 978-1999357-35-1.
- Ueber geheime Gesellschaften und deren Gefährlichkeit für Staat und Religion... translated in German, Königslutter, 1800.
  - [Anti-Jacobin], New Lights on Jacobinism, abstracted from Professor Robison's History of Free Masonry, with an appendix containing an account of Voltaire's behaviour on his death-bed, and a letter from J. H. Stone to Dr. Priestley, disclosing the principles of Jacobinism. By the author of Jacobinism Displayed, Birmingham, E. Piercy, Birmingham, 1798.
  - William Bentley & John Bacon, Extracts from Professor Robison's "Proofs of a Conspiracy" & c., with Brief Reflections on the Charges he has Exhibited, the Evidence he has Produced and the Merit of his Performance, Boston, Manning & Loring, Boston, 1799.
  - Abraham Bishop, Proofs of a Conspiracy, Against Christianity, and the Government of the United States, J. Babcock, 1802.
  - Seth Payson, Proofs of the Real Existence, and Dangerous Tendency, of Illuminism, Containing an Abstract of what Dr. Robinson and the Abbé Barruel have Published on this Subject; with Collateral Proofs and General Observations, Charlestown, 1802 [reprinted by Invisible College Press, LLC, 2003]. ISBN 1-931468-14-1
  - Henry Dana Ward, Free Masonry. Its Pretensions Exposed in Faithful Extracts of its Standard Authors; with a Review of Town's Speculative Masonry; its Liability to Pervert the Doctrines of Revealed Religion, Discovered in the Spirit of its Doctrines, and in the Application of its Emblems: its Dangerous Tendency Exhibited in Extracts from the Abbé Barruel and Professor Robison, and Further Illustrated in its Base Service to the Illuminati, New York, 1828.

== See also ==
- Augustin Barruel, author of "Memoirs Illustrating the History of Jacobinism" (1797)
- Lorenzo Hervás, author of "Causes of the French Revolution" (1807)
- Nicholas Bonneville
- Honoré Gabriel Riqueti, comte de Mirabeau

== Sources ==
- Past anti-Masons : John Robison, on masonicinfo.com
- Biography, Papers of John Robison, Edinburgh University Library
- "The French Revolution and the Bavarian Illuminati", on Robison and Barruel, Freemasonry BC-Y
- "Memoirs of the Life of Dr. Robison," Philosophical Magazine, Vol. X, 1801.
- "Biographical Memoirs of Dr. Robinson, of Edinburgh," Philosophical Magazine, Vol. XIII, 1802.
