= Duke of Mola =

Former hereditary title in the Spanish nobility

Dukedom of Mola
- Creation date: 18 July 1948
- Created by: General Francisco Franco
- Peerage: Spain
- First holder: Emilio Mola, 1st Duke (posthumous title)
- Last holder: Emilio Mola y Pérez de Laborda, 3rd Duke
- Present holder: Abolished
- Remainder to: Absolute primogeniture

Great arms of the Dukedom of Mola as a Grandee of Spain

The Dukedom of Mola (Spanish: Ducado de Mola) was a hereditary title in the Spanish nobility. The dukedom was posthumously bestowed on General Emilio Mola, one of the leaders of the revolt coup of July 1936 that started the Spanish Civil War, by General Francisco Franco as head of the Spanish State.

It was abolished in October 2022, under the purview of the Law of Democratic Memory.

== Dukes of Mola (1948–2022) ==
- Emilio Mola y Vidal, 1st Duke of Mola (posthumous title, d. 1937)
- Emilio Mola y Bascón, 2nd Duke of Mola (1948–2009)
- Emilio Mola y Pérez de Laborda, 3rd Duke of Mola (2009–2022)
