= Juan Tusquets Terrats =

Juan Tusquets Terrats (March 31, 1901 – October 25, 1998) was a Spanish priest, author of the best selling book Orígenes de la revolución española. Turned into a fierce antisemite and even fiercer antimasonic polemicist during the Spanish Second Republic, he became one of the main disseminators of the "contubernio judeomasónico" conspiracy theory in that period.

== Life, influence and anti-semitism ==
He was born in Barcelona on March 31, 1901, into a wealthy banking family of the Catalan bourgeoisie. His father was a descendant of Jewish bankers, a Catalan nationalist, and a friend of Francesc Cambó. His mother came from the Milà family, who had been the patrons of Gaudí. In his adolescence, Tusquets was a militant Catalan nationalist. Following his secondary education at a Jesuit school, he attended the University of Louvain, but transferred to the Pontifical University in Tarragona following the death of his father, where he completed his doctorate on Ramon Llull.

Tusquets was ordained in 1926 and noted for his piety and culture. The process of his ordination was accelerated, allowing him to avoid military service. As a teacher in the seminary of Barcelona he was commissioned to write a book on Madame Blavatsky's theosophism. He developed 'an obsessive interest in secret societies'. By the time of the Spanish Second Republic his obsession had developed into a fierce antisemitism and an even greater hatred of Freemasonry. He turned against Catalanism and falsely accused the Catalan politician Francesc Macia of being a Freemason. Working with another priest, Joaquín Guiu Bonastre, he built up a network of "informants," Freemasons who told him about lodge meetings. He contributed articles to the Carlist newspaper El Correo Catalán.

Tusquets published an edition of The Protocols of the Elders of Zion, which drew on French, German and Russian myths in a fantastical concoction that put forward the idea that a secret Jewish government, the Elders of Zion, was plotting the destruction of Christianity, as 'documentary' evidence for his essential thesis that the Jews were set on the destruction of Christian civilization. Their instruments would be Freemasons and Communists who would use revolution, and pornographic propaganda, and unlimited liberalism. In Spain Tusquets denounced the Second Republic and accused the Catholic president Niceto Alcalá-Zamora of being a Communist, a Jew and a Freemason. Spain and the Catholic Church could be saved only through the destruction of Jews, Freemasons and Communists.

In 1932, Tusquets published his book (Spanish: Origenes de la Revolución Española) Origens of the Spanish Revolution, in which he argued that (Spanish: la masoneria judaica) judaic masonry ran the Republic as a dictatorship. He further used the many articles he wrote for El Correo Catalan and a series of fourteen books, las Sectas, to attack Freemasonry, Communism and Judaism.

The second volume of las Sectas included a complete translation of The Protocols and a section asserting the Jewish assault on Spain could be seen in the Republic's attitude to religion, the movement for agrarian reform and the redistribution of the great estates.

In 1933, Tusquets was invited by the International Anti-masonic Association to visit a newly established concentration camp in southern Germany: Dachau. Afterward, he wrote, "they did it to show what we had to do in Spain." He later claimed to have been shocked by what he saw - 'at the time however the flow and intensity of his anti-Semitic and anti-Masonic publications did not abate.'

In his assessment of Tusquets, historian Paul Preston wrote "Tusquets would come to have influence within the Spanish Right and specifically over Franco, who enthusiastically devoured Tusquets' antisemitic and anti-Masonic diatribes." Ramón Serrano Suñer, Franco's brother-in-law and right-hand man, 1937-42 would later praise Tusquet's contribution to "the creation of the atmosphere which led to the national uprising". Tusquets was on the periphery of the military plot against the Republic further through his links with Catalan Carlists. Two of his brothers, Jaume and Manuel, were killed on 19 July 1939 during the initial coup attempt which led to the Spanish Civil War. Tusquets fled Republican-controlled Spain on a false Portuguese passport, eventually reaching Nationalist-controlled territory through France.

When Tusquets finally became a collaborator of Franco and General Emilio Mola in Burgos during the Civil War, his files on alleged Freemasons would provide an important part of the organisational infrastructure of the repression.

== Books ==
- Masones y Pacifistas, Burgos, 1939.
- Los sin Dios en Rusia
- Ediciones antisectarias, vol. VI
- Ramón Lull, pedagogo de la Cristiandad, Consejo superior de investigaciones científicas, Instituto San José de Calasanz, 1954.
- Apports hispaniques à la philosophie chrétienne de l'Occident, with Joaquin Carreras Artau
- Orígenes de la revolución española, Editorial Vilamala, Barcelona, 1932 [English translation: "Origins of the Spanish Revolution," Uthwita Press, New Orleans, 2023]

== Bibliography ==
- Domínguez Arribas, Javier (2009). El enemigo judeo-masónico en la propaganda franquista, 1936-1945 (in Spanish). Marcial Pons Historia. ISBN 978-84-96467-98-9.
- Preston, Paul (2013). The Spanish Holocaust. London: Harper Collins. ISBN 978-0-00-638695-7.
- Preston, Paul (2023). Architects of Terror: Paranoia, Conspiracy, and Anti-Semitism in Franco's Spain. London, UK: William Collins. ISBN 978-0-00-852212-4.
