= Simonini letter =

Early 19th Century Antisemitic canard

The Simonini letter is the earliest modern example of a document claiming a Jewish conspiracy and a Jewish coalition with the Illuminati.

== History ==
The Simonini letter was a document sent to French author Augustin Barruel in 1806. Barruel had recently published a book claiming that a conspiracy had led to the French Revolution in 1797, when he received the letter from an author identifying himself as Jean-Baptiste Simonini. The letter was dated August 1, 1806 and Barruel received it in Paris on August 20 of the same year.

The author, who claimed to be from Florence, Italy said he had infiltrated the Piedmont Jewish community by claiming to have been a baptized Jew who wanted to restore his connection with his ancestral "nation". The Jews, he said, revealed to him that both the Freemasons and the Illuminati were founded by them and that they were planning on taking over Europe. It is one of the earliest instances of the idea of a Judeo-Masonic conspiracy theory as well as conspiracy involving a cabal of Jews trying to take over the world.

Barruel was unable to establish contact with Simonini. He chose not to publicize the letter, fearing it might incite violence against the Jews, but did circulate it among influential circles in France. Nothing more was heard of the letter until Barruel was on his deathbed in 1820 and summoned a Father Grivel. He confessed to the priest that he had written a new manuscript incorporating the Jews into his Masonic conspiracy theory. This conspiracy began with Mani and included the medieval Knights Templar. The current leadership of this conspiracy was a council of 21, 9 of whom were Jews. However, he burned this manuscript two days before his death.

== Legacy ==
The letter was first published in 1878, in the magazine Le Contemporain. It was subsequently picked up by authors advancing antisemitic conspiracy theories. Its contents are believed to have inspired parts of the Protocols of the Elders of Zion which itself advanced a theory of a secret Jewish conspiracy for world domination.
