= Augustin Barruel =

French publicist and Jesuit priest (1741–1820)

The Reverend Augustin Barruel
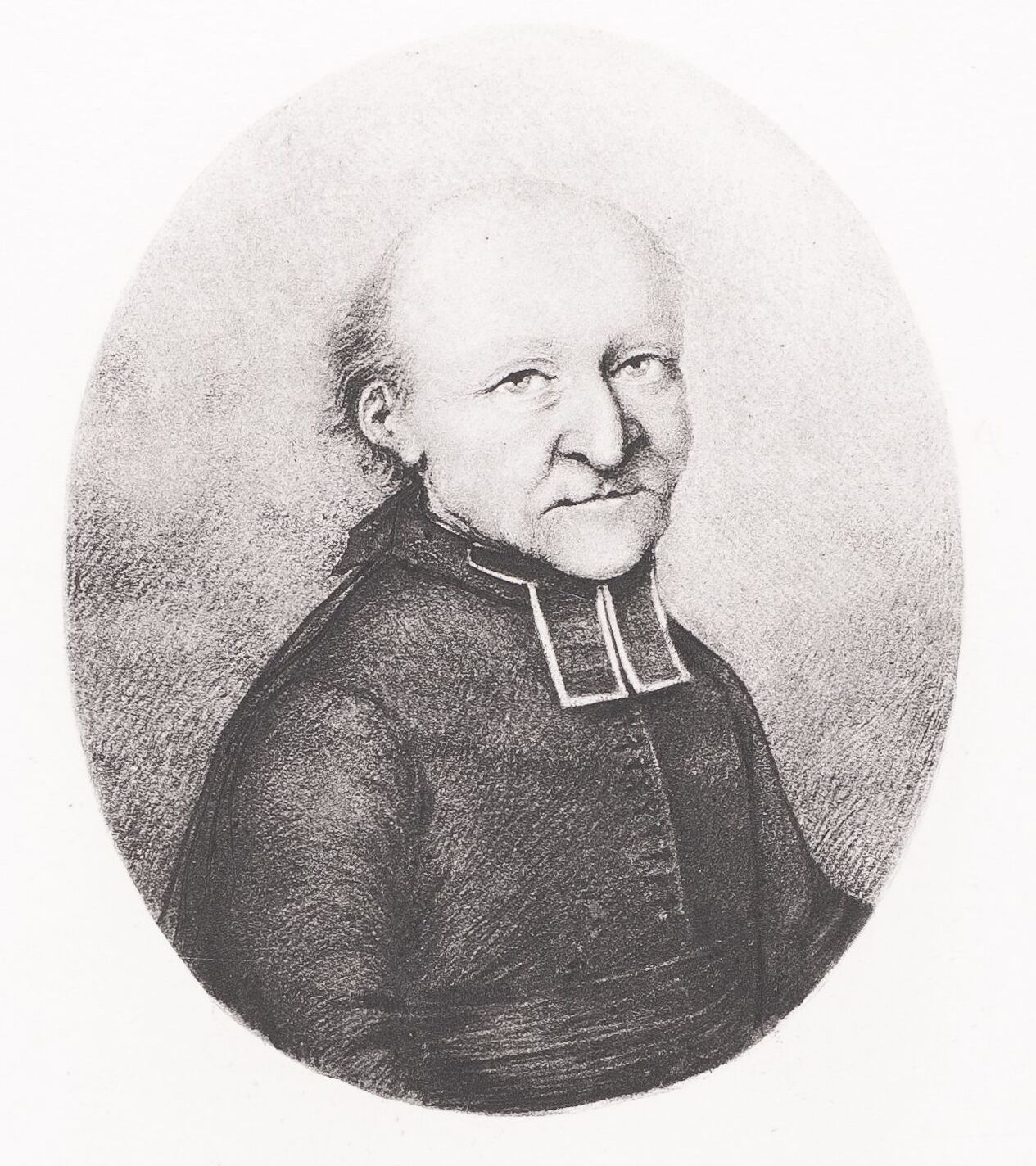
- Born: October 2, 1741; Villeneuve-de-Berg, Ardèche, France
- Died: October 5, 1820 (aged 79); Paris, France
- Occupations: Jesuit priest, historian, writer
- Writing career
- Subjects: Counterrevolution, anti-masonry
- Notable work: Memoirs Illustrating the History of Jacobinism

Signature
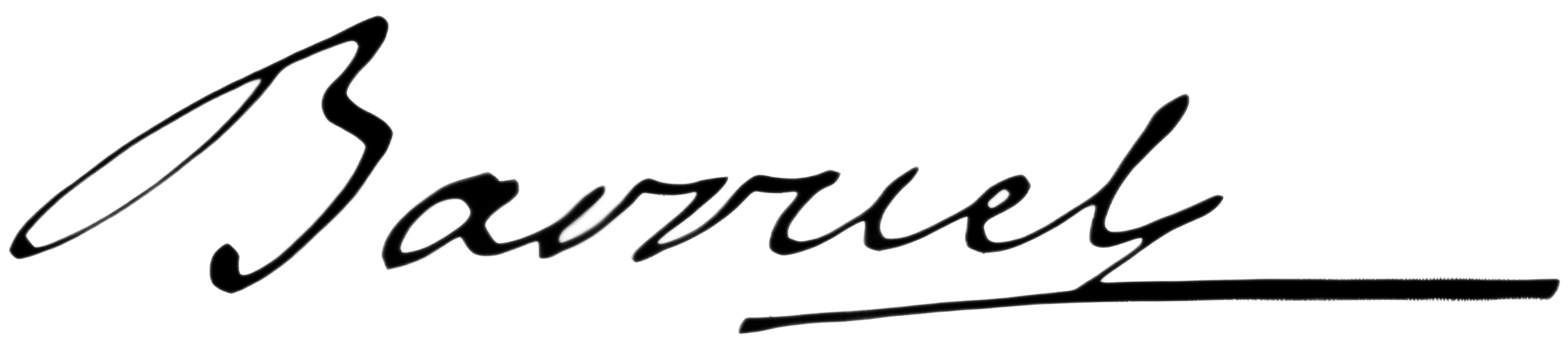

Augustin Barruel (October 2, 1741 – October 5, 1820) was a French journalist, intellectual, and Jesuit priest. He is now mostly known for setting forth the conspiracy theory involving the Bavarian Illuminati and the Jacobins in his book Memoirs Illustrating the History of Jacobinism (original title Mémoires pour servir à l'Histoire du Jacobinisme) published in 1797. In short, Barruel wrote that the French Revolution was planned and executed by the secret societies.

== Biography ==
Augustin Barruel was born at Villeneuve de Berg (Ardèche). He entered the Society of Jesus, commonly known as the Jesuits, in 1756, and taught grammar at Toulouse from 1762. The storm against the Jesuits in France drove him from his country and he was occupied in college work in Moravia and Bohemia until the suppression of the order in 1773. He then returned to France and his first literary work appeared in 1774: Ode sur le glorieux avenement de Louis Auguste au trone. (Ode to the glorious advent to the throne of Louis Auguste). That same year he became a collaborator of the Année littéraire, edited by Fréron. His first important work was Les Helveiennes, ou Lettres Provinciales philosophiques (The Helveiennes or philosophical Provincial Letters) published in 1781.

In the meantime, national affairs in France were growing more and more turbulent, but Barruel continued his literary activity, which from now on occupied itself specially with public questions. In 1789 appeared Lettres sur le Divorce, a refutation of a book by Hennet. From 1788 to 1792 he edited the famous Journal Ecclesiastique founded by Joseph Dinouart in 1760. In this periodical was published Barruel's La Conduite du. S. Siège envers la France, a vigorous defense of Pope Pius VI. He likewise wrote a number of pamphlets against the civil oath demanded from ecclesiastics and against the new civil constitution during 1790 and 1791. He afterward gathered into one Collection Ecclésiastique all of the works relative to the clergy and civil constitution.

== The French Revolution and the conspiracy theory ==
Barruel, a Jesuit exiled from France, using some ideas from John Robison, advanced a conspiracy theory that Jews, Freemasons and Illuminati want to demolish all monarchies plus the Vatican, in order to establish a World Republic. But Barruel did not accuse all Freemasons, and considered himself to be a Freemason. Barruel accused the Knight Templars that they secretly survived and they have infiltrated Freemasonry in order to destroy Christianity.

Barruel's original idea was to depict Jews as engaged in a global conspiracy, a driving force of world history (till then the general consensus was that the Jews are too powerless to do that). Later, Barruel refrained from republishing his book "fearing that it would lead to a massacre of the Jews."

The storm of the French Revolution had in the meantime forced Barruel to seek refuge in England, where he became almoner to the refugee Prince of Conti. Here he wrote in 1793 the Histoire du Clergé pendant la Revolution Française ("History of the Clergy during the French Revolution"). He dedicated the work to the English nation in recognition of the hospitality that it had shown toward the unfortunate French ecclesiastics. It has been translated into German, Italian, Spanish, Polish, and English. The English version went through several editions and did much to strengthen the British nation in its opposition to French revolutionary principles. While in London, Barruel published an English work, A Dissertation on Ecclesiastical Jurisdiction in the Catholic Church. But none of his works attracted so much attention as his Memoirs Illustrating the History of Jacobinism.

His basic idea was that of a conspiracy with the aim of overthrowing Christianity—or more to the point, any and all forms of political and social organization based on conformity to the moral teachings of the Roman Catholic Church. Barruel's conspiracy is notable for suggesting an association between the Occult, the French Enlightenment, and Freemasons. He thereby associated Paganism with Enlightenment thought, a trend followed by some later reactionary thinkers and even contemporary intellectual historians.

It inspired John Robison, who had been working independently on his own conspiracy theory, to extend his book Proofs of a Conspiracy Against all the Religions and Governments of Europe and include several quotations from Barruel. Barruel and Robison were friends.

== Late years ==
On the fall of the Directory in 1799, Barruel was enabled to return to France. He fully accepted and persuaded many other clergymen to accept the new political order of things in his native country and he wrote several books to defend his opinions. When the Concordat was made in 1801 between Pius VII and Napoleon, Barruel wrote: Du Pape et de ses Droits Religieux.

In 1806, he was the recipient of the Simonini letter, which claimed to document a conspiracy among the Jews of Florence, Italy in coalition with the Illuminati. Barruel never published the letter's contents openly, although he likely circulated copies privately and the letter ended up being published in France's Le Contemporain in the 1870's. .

His last important controversy was his defense of the Holy See in its deposition of the French bishops, which he said had been necessitated by the new order of things in France established by the Concordat of 1801. His book appeared also in English: The Papal Power, or an historical essay on the temporal power of the Pope. Many attacked the work, but as usual, the author did not suffer an antagonist to go unanswered. His new work involved him in a very extended controversy, for his work was translated into all the principal European languages. His friends and foes alike became involved in a wordy war. Blanchard published in London no fewer than three refutations. He had promised to compose two works that never appeared: Historie des Sociétés Secrètes au Moyen-Age and Dissertation sur la Croisade contre les Albigeois. In regard to the latter work, Barruel stated his object would be to defend the Church against the reproach of having deposed kings and having freed their subjects from the oath of allegiance. He contended that objections on this score arose only from an ignorance of history. At the time of his death, Barruel was engaged on a refutation of the philosophical system of Immanuel Kant, but never completed his work. He died in Paris in 1820.

== Works ==
- Ode sur le Glorieux Avènement de Louis-Auguste au Trône, Présenté à la Reine, Paris, Valade, 1774.
- Traduction du Latin de M. l'abbé Boscovich, Les Éclipses, poème en six chants, Paris, Valade et Laporte, 1779.
- Les Helviennes, ou Lettres Provinciales Philosophiques, Amsterdam et Paris, Laporte, 1781; Amsterdam et Paris, Moutard, 2 Vol., 1784 et 3e Vol., 1784-1785; Amsterdam et Paris, Briant, Vol. 4-5, 1788; 7e éd. Paris, Pailleux, 1830.
- Lettres sur le Divorce, à un Député de l'Assemblée Nationale, ou bien, Réfutation d'un Ouvrage Ayant pour Titre: "Du Divorce," Paris, Crapart, 1789.
- Le Patriote Véridique, ou Discours sur les Vraies Causes de la Révolution Actuelle, Paris, Crapart, 1789.
- (éd.) Le Plagiat du Comité Soi-disant Ecclésiastique de l'Assemblée Nationale, ou Décret de Julien l'Apostat, Formant les Bases de la Constitution Civile du Clergé Français, Suivi des Représentations de Saint Grégoire de Nazianze, Antioche et Autun, Imprimerie Impériale, 1790.
- Les Vrais Principes sur le Mariage, Opposés au Rapport de M. Durand de Maillane et Servant de Suite aux Lettres sur le Divorce, Paris, Crapart, 1790.
- De la Conduite des Curés dans les Circonstances Présentes. Lettre d'un Curé de Campagne à son Confrère, Député à l'Assemblée Nationale, sur la Conduite à Tenir par les Pasteurs des Ames, dans les Affaires du Jour, Paris, Crapart, 1790.
- Développement du Serment Exigé des Prêtres en Fonction par l'Assemblée Nationale, Paris, Craparad, 1790.
- Question Nationale sur l'Autorité et sur les Droits du Peuple dans le Gouvernement, Paris, Craparad, 1791.
- Question Décisive sur les Pouvoirs ou la Juridiction des Nouveaux Pasteurs, Paris, Crapart, 1791.
- Développement du Second Serment Appelé Civique, Décrété le 16 et le 29 Novembre 1791, Paris, Crapard, [1791] [Pergamon Press, "Les archives de la Révolution française," 1989].
- Préjugés Légitimes sur la Constitution Civile du Clergé et sur le Serment Exigé des Fonctionnaires Publics, Paris, Crapart, 1791.
- (éd.) Collection Ecclésiastique ou Recueil Complet des Ouvrages Faits Depuis l'Ouverture des États Généraux, Relativement au Clergé, à sa Constitution Civile, Décrétée par l'Assemblée Nationale, Sanctionnée par le Roi, Paris, Crapart, 1791-1793.
- Lettre Pastorale de M. l'Évêque d'Evreux, à ses Diocésains. En leur Adressant l'Apologie de la Conduite du Pape, dans les Circonstances Présentes, Paris, Crapart, 1792.
- Histoire du Clergé Pendant la Révolution Française, 2 vol., Londres et Paris, Chez les libraires, 1797.
- Mémoires pour Servir à l'Histoire du Jacobinisme, Hambourg, 5 vol., P. Fauche, 1798-1799. Rééditions: Hambourg, P. Fauche, 1803; Édition Revue et Corrigée, 1818; Abrégé par E. Perrenet éd. Paris, La Renaissance française, 1911; avec un introduction de Christian Lagrave, Diffusion de la pensée française, "Les Maîtres de la Contre-révolution," 1974; Extraits sous le titre: Spartacus Weishaupt, Fondateur des Illuminés de Bavière, Ventabren, Les Rouyat, 1979; Pergamon press, "Les archives de la Révolution Française," 1989; Éditions de Chiré, "Les Maîtres de la Contre-révolution," 2 t., 2005.
- Abrégé des Mémoires pour Servir à l'Histoire du Jacobinisme, 2 vol., Londres, P. Le Boussonnier, 1798, 1799; Luxembourg, 1800; Hambourg, P. Fauche, 1800, 1801; Paris: A. Le Clère, 1817.
- Lettres d'un Voyageur à l'Abbé Barruel, ou Nouveaux Documents pour ses Mémoires, Nouvelles Découvertes Faites en Allemagne, Anecdotes sur Quelques Grands Personnages de ce Pays, Chronique de la Secte, etc. (1er juin-1er novembre 1799), Londres, Dulau, 1800.
- Du Pape et de ses Droits Religieux, à l'Occasion du Concordat, 2 vol., Paris, Crapart, 1803.
- Trois Propositions sur l’Église de France, Établie en Vertu du Concordat, Londres, J. Booker, [1804].
- Du Principe et de l'Obstination des Jacobins, en Réponse au Sénateur Grégoire, Paris, 1814; [Trad. italienne: Del principio e della ostinazione dei Giacobini; risposta dell’abate Barruel al senator Gregoire, Torino, Galletti, 1814].
- Réplique Pacifique aux Trois Avocats de M. le Sénateur Grégoire, Paris, [s. n.], 1814.
- (éd.) Recueil Précieux pour les Historiens de ce Temps, ou Choix de Brochures et de Pamphlets sur les Personnages et les Événements de la Révolution à dater de la Première Abdication de Buonaparte jusqu'au Moment Présent, 4 vol., Paris, Chez les marchands de nouveautés, 1815.
- Réponse a l’avocat de la Petite-Église, Laval, Portier, [1818].
- Lettres inédites de Barruel à son retour d’exil (1802-1806), publiées par Abel Dechêne, Aubenas, C. Habauzit, 1923.

=== Works translated to English, and related documents ===
- Memoirs, Illustrating the History of Jacobinism, Vol. 2, Vol. 3, Vol. 4, Hudson & Goodwin for C. Davis, 1789.
- A Dissertation on Ecclesiastical Jurisdiction in the Catholic Church, J. P. Coghlan, 1794.
- The History of the Clergy During the French Revolution, in Three Parts, I. Neale & H. Kammerer, 1794.
- Selections from the Abbe Barruel's "Memoirs, Illustrating the History of Jacobinism," with Brief Remarks on that Performance, Phinehas Allen, 1802.
- The Anti-Christian and Anti-Social Conspiracy: An Extract from the French of the Abbé Barruel. To which is Prefixed, "Jachin and Boaz; or, an Authentic Key to the Door of Free-masonry, Ancient and Modern," Joseph Ehrenfried, 1812.
  - Clifford, Robert. Application of Barruel's Memoirs of Jacobinism, to the Secret Societies of Ireland and Great Britain, E. Booker, 1798.

== See also ==
- Lorenzo Hervás, author of "Causes of the French Revolution" (1807)
- John Robison, author of "Proofs of a Conspiracy" (1797)
