= Memoirs Illustrating the History of Jacobinism =

1797–98 book by Abbé Augustin Barruel

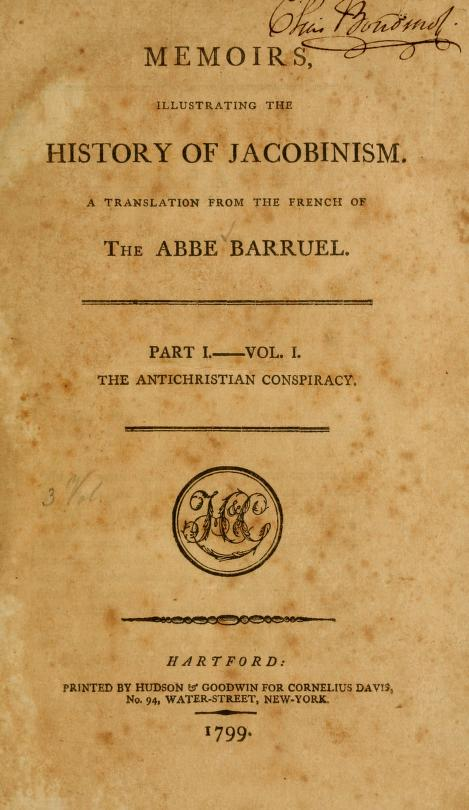
- The title page of a 1799 American edition of Memoirs Illustrating the History of Jacobinism.
- Author: Abbé Augustin Barruel
- Original title: Mémoires pour servir à l'histoire du Jacobinisme
- Translator: Robert Clifford (English language)
- Publisher: De l'Imprimerie Françoise, chez Ph. Le Boussonnier & Co. No. 122 Wardour Street, Oxford Street. Se vend chez A. Dulau & Co. No. 107 Wardour Street, Soho. Et chez De Bosse, Gerard Street. Boosey, Royal Exchange. Booker, Bond Street. Et chez P. Fauche, à Hambourg, a Londres
- Publication date: 1797–1798
- Publication place: London, England, United Kingdom
- OCLC: 519407172

Memoirs Illustrating the History of Jacobinism (French: Mémoires pour servir à l’histoire du Jacobinisme) is a book by Abbé Augustin Barruel, a French Jesuit priest. It was written and published in French in 1797–1798, and translated into English by one Robert Clifford in the same years.

In the book, Barruel claims that the French Revolution was the result of a decades-long conspiracy to subvert and then overthrow the European ancien régime of throne, altar and aristocracy. The plot was allegedly hatched by a coalition of philosophes, Freemasons, and Illuminati, creating a system that was eventually brought to fulfillment by the Jacobin revolutionaries. Barruel was the first to allege such a scheme in a fully developed historical context with voluminous documentary evidence. The first three volumes each focus on a separate contributing group of conspirators, and the fourth on their culminating union in the Jacobins.

Barruel's Memoirs are representative of the criticism of the philosophes and the Enlightenment that spread throughout Europe in reaction to the Revolution. It was immediately popular, and was read and commented on by most of the important literary and political journals of the day. It was published in a number of languages and remained in print well into the 20th century, stirring debate about the role of the philosophes, their ideas, and the Enlightenment in the Revolution. Barruel wound accusations tightly around his foes and tied them firmly into compromising positions. The work is considered one of the founding documents of the right-wing interpretation of 18th century French history, closely linking the Enlightenment and the Revolution, a connection which remains a topic of historical debate.

== Background ==
Abbé Augustin Barruel (1741–1820) became a Jesuit in 1756 but by 1762 anti-Jesuit feeling in France had become so strong that he left and travelled for many years, returning only in 1773. The events of the French Revolution in 1792 caused him to leave again and take refuge in England. His dislike and hostility towards the philosophers was well known and well developed before 1789, as he had been on the editorial staff of the popular anti-philosophe literary journal Année littéraire decades before the Revolution. He wrote the Memoirs in 1797 as an exile in London. It was published in French by the French publishing company at 128 Wardour Street, Oxford Street, London. An English edition was issued the same year, and the work quickly became a commercial success. The multi-volume work went through four revised French editions by 1799 and was translated into English, German, Italian, Spanish, Swedish, and Russian as editions were issued in London, Hamburg, Augsburg, Luxembourg, St. Petersburg, Dublin, Naples and Rome before the fall of Napoleon.

== Synopsis ==
=== Outline of the work ===
In his "Preliminary Discourse", Barruel defines the three forms of conspiracy as the "conspiracy of impiety" against God and Christianity, the "conspiracy of rebellion" against kings and monarchs, and "the conspiracy of anarchy" against society in general. He sees the end of the 18th century as "one continuous chain of cunning, art, and seduction" intended to bring about the "overthrow of the altar, the ruin of the throne, and the dissolution of all civil society".

The first volume examines the anti-Christian conspiracy which Barruel claims began in 1728, when Voltaire "consecrated his life to the annihilation of Christianity". He alleged that the sect of philosophes, led by Voltaire, the scientist d’Alembert, the Encyclopedist Denis Diderot, and King Frederick II of Prussia, planned out the course of events that led to the French Revolution. They began with an attack on the Church with a "subterranean warfare of illusion, error, and darkness", creating the intellectual framework that put the conspiracy in motion and controlled the ideology of the burgeoning secret societies. "Writers of this species, so far from enlightening the people, only contribute to lead them into the path of error".

Their fervent appeals for equality and liberty really aimed to legitimize "pride and revolt". Barruel returned to the principal texts of the Enlightenment and drew close links between the philosophism of the time and the anti-Christian campaigns of the Revolution. Barruel's direct and extensive quotes show a deep knowledge of the philosophes' beliefs which is unusual among the enemies of the Enlightenment.

The second volume focuses on the anti-monarchical conspiracy led by Jean Jacques Rousseau and Baron de Montesquieu, who sought to destroy the established rulers under the guise of "independence and liberty". Barruel analyses and criticizes Montesquieu's The Spirit of Laws and Rousseau's Social Contract as "giv[ing] birth to that disquieted spirit which fought to investigate the rights of sovereignty, the extent of their authority, the pretended rights of the free man, and without which every subject is branded for a slave - and every king a despot". He believed that the influence of these two writers was essential to the rise of the revolutionary spirit, agreeing in this with the revolutionaries themselves.

Barruel believed that the philosophes' writings and spirit directly inspiried the anti-monarchical feelings of the Jacobins and the revolutionaries, as they trampled "underfoot the altars and the thrones in the name of that equality and that liberty which summon the peoples to the disasters of revolution and the horrors of anarchy". Barruel equated the rejection of monarchy with a rejection of any type of order, government, and civil society, leading to a "reign of anarchy and absolute independence".

Barruel's third volume addresses the antisocial conspiracy of the Freemasons and the Order of the Illuminati, which built on the philosophes' attacks on church and throne. He believed these secret societies constituted a single sect of over 300,000 members who were "all zealous for the Revolution, and all ready to rise at the first signal and to impart the shock to all others classes of the people". Barruel surveyed the history of Masonry and maintained that its higher mysteries had always been of an atheist and republican cast. He believed the Freemasons kept their aims secret for many years, but on August 12, 1792, two days after the fall of the French monarchy, they ran through the streets shouting "Liberty, Equality, and Fraternity", agitating for the establishment of the republic.

In other countries, however the Masons still plotted in secret. A division of the group into numerous lodges ensured that if one lodge were exposed, the rest would remain hidden. The Illuminati refined the Masons' secret structure. Even after the Illuminati leader Johann Adam Weishaupt was discovered and tried in court, the proceedings could not uncover the universal influence of the sect and no steps were taken against them. The secret socieities functioned to radicalize social and political movements against the throne and altar, and enrolled members of the population to subscribe to their hidden principles.

For Barruel, the final designs of the coalition of the philosophes, the Freemasons and the Illuminati were achieved by the Jacobin clubs. They were formed by "the adepts of impiety, the adepts of rebellion, and the adepts of anarchy" working together to achieve their radical aims. Barruel believed that the Jacobins were the direct successors and executors of the older secret societies.

=== The Memoirs and the French Revolution ===
According to Barruel, the first major assault on the Enlightenment came during the French Revolution. In the minds of many, the Enlightenment was inextricably connected to the Revolution that followed. This presumed link resulted in an explosion of literature that was hostile to the Enlightenment. When the leaders of the Revolution canonized Voltaire and Rousseau and made the Enlightenment themes of reason, progress, anti-clericalism and emancipation central to their own revolutionary vocabulary, it created a link that meant any backlash against the Revolution would increase opposition to the Enlightenment. The advent of what Graeme Garrard has called the "continuity thesis" between the Enlightenment and the Revolution – the belief that they were connected in some intrinsic way, as cause and effect- proved damaging to the Enlightenment.

For Barruel, the Revolution was not a spontaneous popular uprising expressing a long-suppressed general will. It was instead the consequence of a united minority group who used force, subterfuge and terror to impose their will on an innocent and unsuspecting population. Barruel believed that the Revolution was caused by Voltaire, Rousseau and the other philosophes who conspired with secret societies to destroy Catholicism and the monarchy in France. He argued that the writings of the philosophes had a great influence on those who would lead the Revolution and that Voltaire and his followers were responsible for the training of revolutionaries. It was from the followers of the philosophes "that the revolutionary ministers Necker and Turgot started up; from this class arose those grand revolutionary agents, the Mirabeaux, Sieyes, Laclos, Condorcets; these revolutionary trumps, the Brissots, Champforts, Garats, Cheniers; those revolutionary butchers, the Carras, Frerons, Marats".

=== The Encyclopédie ===
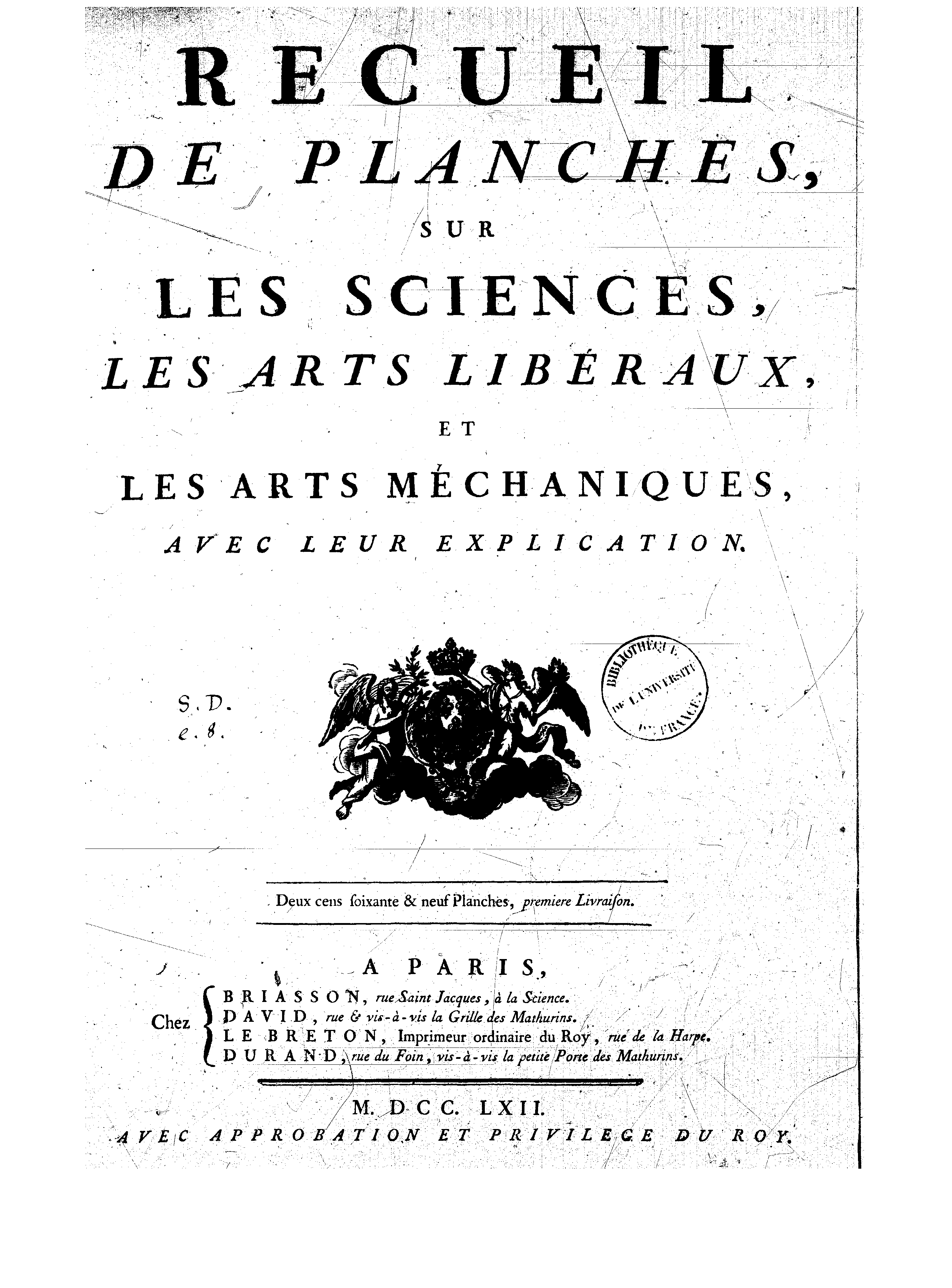
First page of Volume 1 of the Encyclopédie.

Within the Memoirs, Barruel alleged that Diderot's Encyclopédie was a Masonic project. He believed that the written works of the philosophes penetrated all aspects of society and that this massive collection was of particular significance. The Encyclopédie was only the first step in philosophizing mankind and was necessary to spread the impious and anti-monarchical writings. This created a mass movement against the church and society. Barruel believed that the conspirators attempt to "imbue the minds of the people with the spirit of insurrection and revolt" and to promote radicalism within all members of society. This was believed to be the main reason behind the Encyclopédie as it was "a vast emporium of all the sophisms, errors, or calumnies which had ever been invented against religion". It contained "the most profligate and impious productions of Voltaire, Diderot, Boulanger, La Mettrie, and of other Deists or Atheists of the age, and this under the specious pretence of enlightening ignorance". Barruel believed the volumes of the Encyclopédie were valuable in controlling the minds of intellectuals and in creating a public opinion against Christianity and monarchy.

=== Philosophism ===
Philosophism was a term used by Barruel within the Memoirs to refer to the pretend philosophy that the philosophes practiced. It was originally coined by Catholic opponents of the philosophes but was popularized by Barruel. It referred to the principles that were shared by philosophes, Freemasons, and Illuminati. Barruel defined philosophism as "the error of every man who, judging of all things by the standard of his own reason, rejects in religious matters every authority that is not derived from the light of nature. It is the error of every man who denies the possibility of any mystery beyond the limits of reason if everyone who, discarding revelation in defence of the pretended rights of reason, Equality, and Liberty, seeks to subvert the whole fabric of the Christian religion".

The term had a lasting influence as by the end of the 18th century it had become a popular term of abuse used by conservative journals to refer to supporters of the Revolution. These journals accused those who practiced philosophism as having no principles or respect for authority. They were skeptics who failed to believe in the monarchy and the church and thus, had no principles. The use of the term became pervasive in the Anti-Jacobin Review and contributed to the belief in a connection between the Enlightenment and the Revolution and its supporters. Philosophism became a powerful tool of anti-revolutionary and anti-Jacobin rhetoric.

=== Members of the conspiracy ===
Barruel identified a number of individuals who he believed played direct roles in the Enlightenment and the conspiracy against Christianity and the state. He identified Voltaire as the "chief", d’Alembert as the "most subtle agent", Frederick II as the "protector and adviser", and Diderot as its "forlorn hope". Voltaire was at the head of the conspiracy because he spent his time with the highest levels of European society. His attention and efforts were directed at kings and high-ranking ministers. D'Alembert worked behind the scenes and inside the more common areas of French society. He employed his skill in the cafes and academies and attempted to bring more followers to the conspiracy. Barruel takes a close look at the correspondence between Voltaire and d'Alembert and uses this as evidence of their plot to overthrow society. He is deeply concerned with the fact that those he identifies as the leaders of the plot had secret names for one another in their private correspondence. Voltaire was "Raton", d'Alembert was "Protagoras", Frederick was "Luc", and Diderot was known as "Plato". Barruel also argued that the conspiracy extended far beyond this small group of philosophes. He believed that the court of Louis XV was a "Voltairean ministry" of powerful men. This group involved Marquis d'Argenson who "formed the plan for the destruction of all religious orders in France", the Duc de Choiseul who was "the most impious and most despotic of ministers", the "friend and confidant of d'Alembert", Archbishop de Briennes, and Malesherbes, "protector of the conspiracy".

According to Barruel, this group of influential leaders worked together with a number of adepts who supported the conspiracy. The most important adept that Barruel identifies is Condorcet. Barruel claimed that Condorcet was a Freemason and leading member of the Society of 1789 who was elected to the Legislative Assembly and was "the most resolute atheist". Condorcet was important because he embodied everything that Barruel claimed the conspiracy was. He was a Freemason that associated with the philosophes and who would become an influential member of the revolution process. Barruel also lists the Baron d'Holbach, Buffon, La Mettrie, Raynal, Abbé Yvon, Abbé de Prades, Abbé Morrelet, La Harpe, Marmontel, Bergier and Duclos among the members of the "synagogue of impiety".

== Barruel's techniques of argumentation ==
As a Catholic apologist of the religious and political status quo, Barruel downplayed his own Catholicism and presented himself as a neutral party within the radicalized debate surrounding the Revolution. His tactic was to cite document after document with a commentary that effectively showed it was the truth. The reader of the Memoirs could have been any individual who doubted some of Barruel's inferences, but who would eventually be overwhelmed by the sheer weight of evidence against the Enlightenment and liberation movements. His fanatical hatred for revolutionary and enlightenment ideas is hidden behind a faux neutrality and casuistic slight of pen. By isolating single passages and quoting them out of context, Barruel presented what seemed to be a convincing case. He made up for quality with quantity and persuaded a number of contemporaries to adopt his view. The Memoirs is constructed according to reason and Barruel attempts to use the Enlightenment's own tool to bring about its demise.

== Reception ==
Barruel's work was influential and impossible to ignore. The Freemasons of France, Germany, and England angrily contested his assertions and a voluminous literature was the consequence. Even his critics were forced to take him seriously in their attempt to refute his arguments. The Memoirs were written about and discussed at length by leading literary and philosophical figures.

Edmund Burke, an English political thinker and the Revolution's most known intellectual foe, was impressed by the work of Barruel in uncovering a connection between the Enlightenment and the French Revolution. Burke wrote a letter to Barruel and expressed his admiration. He wrote, "I cannot easily express to you how much I am instructed and delighted by the first volume of your History of Jacobinism." He praised "the whole of the wonderful narrative" for being supported by documents and proofs with "the most judicial regularity and exactness." At the end of the letter Burke added: "I forgot to say, that I have known myself, personally, five of your principal conspirators; and I can undertake to say from my own certain knowledge, that as far back as the year 1773, they were busy in the plot you have so well described, and in the manner, and on the principle you have so truly represented. To this I can speak as a witness." Burke's own works were also filled with references to the philosophe sect and a dislike for their "fanaticism, atheism and perversion of public morals".

Others soon took up the arguments of Burke and Barruel. In England, the Scottish scientist John Robison published Proofs of a Conspiracy against All the Religions and Governments of Europe, carried on in the Secret Meetings of the Free Masons, Illuminati, and Reading Societies. The work, published in 1798, detailed a conspiracy that involved philosophes, Masons, and the Illuminati and their desire to "root out all the religious establishments and overturn all the existing governments of Europe". Robinson's text has been characterized as being less detailed but more refined than Barruel's Memoirs. Even with these differences, Robinson's work supported the conspiracy that Barruel purported to have discovered. Barruel himself commented on the similarities, stating "Without knowing it, we have fought for the same cause with the same arms, and pursued the same course". The two writers had many similarities in their arguments and conclusions and their books spawned an anti-Enlightenment and anti-revolution discussion that was constructed on the same theses.

Despite the initial popularity of the book, Barruel's opponents soon rejected his book. Jean Joseph Mounier, a member of the National Assembly during the beginning of the French Revolution, insisted the Revolution broke out because of the failure of the established authorities to handle a number of crises that occurred. He blamed the parlements of France for attempting to become rivals of the monarch and the spirit of intolerance in France. Mounier believed the Revolution was a result of social and political tensions and he did not believe there was a planned conspiracy. Joseph de Maistre, a well known counter-revolution theorist, also did not accept Barruel's conspiracy theory. He wrote a short rejection of the Memoirs in which he termed Barruel's accusations "foolish" and "false". Maistre rejected the idea of the Freemasons being partly responsible, perhaps because he was a member himself, and did not believe that the Illuminati were as powerful as Barruel made them out to be.

== Contribution and legacy ==
Barruel's version of the revolution, which blamed specific men and pointed out a single cause, has been rejected by the majority of scholars, as the concept of a "master conspiracy" lies on the fringes of historical analysis. Still, his Memoirs do retain historical significance. Amos Hofman has argued that Barruel's work "appears to be the first systematic attempt to discuss the role of conspiracy in a revolution". The theory of conspiracy is a tool for Barruel that is used in an attempt to discredit "public politics", or politics based on the support of public opinion. Hofman shows how Barruel sought to prove that public politics, demanded by both the philosophes and the revolutionaries, could not in fact exist, as it was an illusion designed to create support for their private desire to control France. Barruel's theory of conspiracy is important as a "reaction to a problem that was at the focus of the ideological struggle during the second half of the eighteenth century – the problem of the rise of public opinion as a political factor that had to be taken into account by the leaders of society". According to this view, Memoirs Illustrating the History of Jacobinism can be read as an attempt to understand the public appeal of the ideas of the Enlightenment and mass politics. Barruel's text is also important for its entrenchment of an understanding of conspiracy within modern politics. Conspiracy was seen as a motivating cause of revolution because it suggested conflict within the society. It viewed politics as a clash between opposing ideas which, because of substantial division, could not be solved by a compromise. The society that Barruel creates was not divided by legitimate beliefs and divergent interests. Instead, it was a binary divide between the united and wholly patriotic group that included Barruel and the unholy alliance of traitors and criminals. Barruel's theory of a master conspiracy and his understanding of the causes of political change still influence society.

Memoirs Illustrating the History of Jacobinism has also been seen as a primary source that can be used to examine Freemasonry in Europe. Even though Freemasonry became a target in the paranoid literature that blamed the Revolution partly on the activities of Masons, the work still had some historical value in regard to the group. Margaret Jacob argues that Barruel's writings "offer a point of departure for understanding the relationship between the Continental Enlightenment, as it was lived in the clubs, societies, and lodges of the eighteenth century, and the outbreak of the democratic revolutions in the late 1780s in Amsterdam, Brussels, and most important, Paris." She believes that if readers can look past the paranoia within the text, it can provide information about how Freemasons were treated during the Revolution. Jacob also sees value in the text because Barruel argued for a distinction between English Freemasonry and its Continental counterpart. Barruel believed that his allegations against the Continental Freemasons did not apply to the respectable English Freemasons. The activities of the English Freemasons were not the cause for concern. He distinguishes between the circumstances of the French and the English and shows that the language used in each situation was important. He believes that the Masonic language about equality, liberty, and fraternity bears relation to the radical and democratic phase of the French Revolution and to Jacobin language. From the book, Margaret Jacob salvages the realization that language is important and that it can have a social force all of its own.

Barruel's polemic is an important source for the understanding of the mentality of the opponents of the French Revolution and their understanding of the ideological origins of the Revolution. Furthermore, Barruel is seen as the father of modern conspiracy theory. The Memoirs contain all of the elements that continue to characterize conspiracy narratives today, including the argument that a hidden group is orchestrating world events behind the scenes, and an attempt to construct a direct lineage from the past to the present. Barruel presents a thorough application of conspiracy theory methodology. As a result, he has had a lasting influence on following generations. Various 20th Century works attacking Communism and the Russian Revolution can be seen to follow his model.

== See also ==
- Augustin Barruel
- Conspiracy theory
- Counter-Enlightenment
- Curtis Yarvin
- Encyclopédie
- Frederick II of Prussia
- Freemasonry
- Illuminati
- Philosophe
- Science in the Age of Enlightenment

== Bibliography ==
- Barruel, Abbé Augustin. Memoirs Illustrating the History of Jacobinism. Hartford: Hudson & Goodwin, 1799.
- Chandler, David. "Abbé Barruel, SJ, William Taylor, and the Pelican Business." The Allen Review Issue No. 19, 1998.
- Edmund Burke to Abbé Barruel, May 1, 1797. In Thomas W. Copeland, ed.. The Correspondence of Edmund Burke, 10 Vols.. Chicago and Cambridge, 1958–1978.
- Garrard, Graeme. Counter Enlightenments: From the Eighteenth Century to the Present. London and New York: Routledge, 2006.
- Hofman, Amos. "Opinion, Illusion, and the Illusion of Opinion: Barruel's Theory of Conspiracy." Eighteenth Century Studies Vol. 27 No. 1 (1993). 27–60.
- Jacob, Margaret C.. Living the Enlightenment. Oxford: Oxford University Press, 1991.
- Kaufman, Will. Britain and the Americas. Santa Barbara: ABC-CLIO, 2005.
- Knight, Peter. Conspiracy Theories in American History. Santa Barbara: ABC-CLIO, 2003.
- McMahon, Darrin M.. Enemies of the Enlightenment. New York: Oxford University Press, 2001.
- Ridley, Jasper. The Freemasons. London: Constable and Company Limited, 2003.
- Schmidt, James. "Inventing the Enlightenment Anti-Jacobins, British Hegelians and the Oxford English Dictionary." Journal of the History of Ideas Vol. 64 No. 3, July 2003. 421–443.
- Tombs, Robert. France 1814–1914. New York: Addison Wesley Longman Limited, 1996.
