= Vitaliy Shishakov =

Russian journalist (1893–1972)

Vitaliy Alekseevich Shishakov (Russian: Виталий Алексеевич Шишаков; 18 June 1893 – 29 September 1972), was a Soviet popularizer of scientific knowledge, journalist, candidate of pedagogical sciences, and an honorary member of the All-Union Astronomical and Geodetic Society (1965).

== Life ==
Shishakov served as a private in an artillery unit during the First World War. He graduated from the provincial out-of-school education courses in Voronezh in 1918. In 1918–1921 he worked in the Nizhnedevitsky uyezd: a cultural enlightenment worker in the Istobensky volost, deputy head of the district public education, head of the district political enlightener, secretary of the newspaper "Krasny communar" (Russian: "Красный коммунар"), "Izvestiya uiskolkoma and ucoma of the RCP (b)" (Russian: "Известия уисполкома и укома РКП(б)"). Member of the Voronezh Communist Union of Journalists ("Comsozhur" Russian: "Комсожур"). He was an employee of the provincial newspaper "Voronezhskaya communa" (Russian: "Воронежская коммуна") and "Nasha gazeta" (Russian: "Наша газета") in 1922–1923. Correspondent of the newspaper "Pravda" in the Voronezh province (1923). Organizer of the Voronezh Provincial Union of Atheists (1921). Responsible secretary of the scientific society "Atheist" (1923). Instructor, lecturer-methodologist of the Central Council of the League of Militant Atheists of the USSR (Moscow, since 1929). In 1934, Vitaly Alekseevich Shishakov became the first leader of the astronomical circle that had just opened at the Moscow Planetarium. Organized the publication of the annual "School Astronomical Calendar" (since 1949, 23 issues). He died in Moscow.

== Works ==
The author of about 100 popular science books, mainly on astronomy. Some of the books were written by Shishakov together with Professor K. L. Baev. His works have been translated into Bulgarian, Hungarian, Romanian, Polish, and Czech languages. The author of about 100 popular science books, mainly on astronomy. Some of the books were written by Shishakov together with Professor K. L. Baev.

=== Books ===
- Воинствующее безбожие в СССР за 15 лет. 1917-1932 : сборник (Militant Atheism in the USSR for 15 Years. 1917-1932: Collection)/ Центральный совет Союза воинствующих безбожников и Институт философии Коммунистической академии; под редакцией М. Енишерлова, А. Лукачевского, М. Митина. – Москва : ОГИЗ : Государственное антирелигиозное издательство, 1932. – 525, 2 с. : ил., портр.; / В. Шишаков. – Союз воинствующих безбожников (1925–1931) / С. 323–339
- Классовая сущность религии (Class Essence of Religion): Методическая разработка бесед в связи с праздниками рождества и пасхи для школ ликбеза... / В. Шишаков. – Москва; Ленинград : Гос. изд-во, 1929 (М. : тип. "Красный пролетарий"). – 27, [4] с.;
- "Почему считают годы от "рождества христова": (Как возникло летосчисление от "рождества христова", если "христа" не было)" (Why Do They Count the Years from the "Birth of Christ": (How Did the Chronology from "the Birth of Christ" Arise, If There Was No "Christ"))/ В. Шишаков. – Москва : акц. изд. (о-во) "Безбожник", 1929 ("Мосполиграф" 14-я тип.). – 46, [2] с. : ил.; 17х13 см. – (Популярная антирелигиозная библиотека/ Центр. совет Союза воинствующих безбожников. Под общ. ред. А. Лукачевского и Вл. Сарабьянова);
- Небо религии и небо науки (Sky Religion and Sky Science): Объясн. текст диапозитивного фильма под общ. ред. (ЦС СВБ) / В. Шишаков. – Москва : ф-ка No. 5 треста "Союзтехфильм", 1934 (тип. Госиздата ССР Армении). – 69 с., 1 с. объявл.;
- Профсоюзы на борьбу с религией (Unions to Fight Religion). / В. Шишаков. – Москва : Профиздат, 1932. – 31 с.; 20 см.;
- Великий ученый Галилео Галилей (The Great Scientist Galileo Galilei). : К 375-летию со дня рождения : 1564–1642. – [Москва] : Моск. планетарий, 1939. – 8 с. Без обл.;
- Выдающиеся деятели науки. : Краткий очерк деятельности 24 выдающихся ученых (Outstanding Scientists.: Brief Essay of the Activities of 24 Eminent Scientists). – 2-е изд. – Москва : Моск. планетарий, 1940. – 64 с. : портр.;
- Небо и небесные явления (Sky and Astronomical Events). : (Мироведение в самом сжатом очерке). – [Москва] : Моск. планетарий, 1940. – 112 с. : ил., портр., черт., карт., схем.;
- Основоположник русской науки Михаил Васильевич Ломоносов. (1711-1765) (The Founder of Russian Science, Mikhail Vasilyevich Lomonosov. (1711-1765)). : (Мат-лы для поясн. бесед на выставке, посвящ. 175-летию со дня смерти великого ученого). – [Москва] : Моск. планетарий, 1940. – 64 с.;
- Полярные сияния (Auroras). – Москва : Моск. планетарий, 1940. – 8 с.;
- Простейший самодельный телескоп и наблюдения с ним (The Simplest Homemade Telescope and Observations with it). – Москва : Моск. планетарий, 1940. – 52 с. : ил., черт., схем.;
- Сказки о "небесных знамениях" в свете науки (Fairy Tales of "Celestial Signs" in the Light of Science). – [Москва] : Моск. планетарий, 1940. – 112 с. : ил., черт.;
- Что такое небо? (What is Sky?)- Москва : Моск. планетарий, 1940. – 8 с.;
- Что такое падающие звезды? (What are Falling Stars?)- Москва : Моск. планетарий, 1940. – 8 с.;
- Земля планета. – Москва : Моск. планетарий, 1941. – 8 с. Без обл.;
- В помощь учителю астрономии в средней школе : Метод. пособие. – Москва : Учпедгиз, 1952. – 152 с. : ил.;
- "Небо и небесные явления" (). – Москва : Voenizdat, 1951. – 128 с. : ил., карт.;
- Гениальный русский ученый: (Материал для бесед к 250-летию со дня рождения М. В. Ломоносова). – Москва : Знание, 1961. – 20 с.; 22 см. – (В помощь лектору/ Всесоюз. о-во по распространению полит. и науч. знаний. Науч.-метод. совет по пропаганде физ., матем. и астрон. знаний);
- В помощь учителю астрономии в средней школе : Метод. пособие (To Help the Teacher of Astronomy in High School: Methodical Manual). – 2-е изд., перераб. – Москва : Учпедгиз, 1960. – 168 с. : черт.;
- Галилео Галилей (Galileo Galilei). – Москва : Сов. Россия, 1964. – 38 с.;
- Поговорим о религии. – Москва : Соцэкгиз, 1960. – 112 с.;
- Рассказы о Луне (Stories about the Moon). – Москва : Гостехиздат, 1958. – 48 с. : ил.; 20 см. – (Научно-просветительская б-ка; Вып. 17);
- Сказки о "небесных знамениях" в свете науки: Краткий текст лекции к серии диапозитивов / В. А. Шишаков. – Москва : Моск. планетарий, 1939. – 39 с.;
- Стражи времени. – [Москва] : Мол. гвардия, 1960. – 48 с. : ил.;
- Основоположник русской науки Михаил Васильевич Ломоносов (1711 – 1765): Лекционные материалы к серии диапозитивов / В. А. Шишаков. – Москва : Моск. планетарий, 1940. – 54 с.;
- Полярные сияния. / В. А. Шишаков. – Москва : Моск. планетарий, 1945 (тип. им. Ворошилова). – 15 с.;
- Что такое падающие звезды / В. А. Шишаков. – Москва : Моск. планетарий, 1945 (Центр. тип. им. Ворошилова). – 15 с. без обл.;
- Что такое падающие звезды / В. А. Шишаков. – Москва : Моск. планетарий, 1945 (хром.-гр. ф-ка). – 13 с. без обл.;
- Наша планетная система : Пояснительный текст / Автор В. А. Шишаков. – Москва : Моск. планетарий, 1939. – 31 с.; 14 см. – (Вселенная в свете науки : Серия диапозитивов; Ч. 1);
- Христианство и его эволюция : (Краткий обзор возникновения, развития и содержания христианской религии) / В. Шишаков; Воронежск. союз атеистов. – Воронеж : Гос. изд-во, 1923. – [4], 86, [1] с.;
- Полярные сияния. / Моск. планетарий. – [Москва] : [б. и.], [1939]. – 4 с. Без обл. и тит. л.;
- Почему Луна меняет свою видимую форму / Моск. планетарий. – [Москва] : [б. и.], [1939]. – 4 с. Без обл. и тит. л.;
- Хвостатые звезды – кометы / Моск. планетарий. – [Москва] : [б. и.], [1939]. – 4 с. Без обл. и тит. л.;
- Что такое небо? / Моск. планетарий. – [Москва] : [б. и.], [1939]. – 4 с. Без обл. и тит. л.;
- Что такое падающие звезды? / Моск. планетарий. – [Москва] : [б. и.], [1939]. – 4 с. Без обл. и тит. л.;
- Было ли начало и будет ли конец мира. / Моск. планетарий. – [Москва] : [б. и.], [1940]. – 4 с.;
- Какая сила движет Землю. / В. Шишаков, науч. сотрудник Моск. планетария. – Пенза : изд. и типолит. изд-ва газ. "Сталинск. знамя", 1945. – 16 с. : ил.; 15 см. – (Библиотечка агитатора и пропагандиста. Беседа на научно-естественные темы);
- О религиозных обрядах, обычаях и праздниках/ / Канд. пед. наук В. А. Шишаков. – Москва : Воениздат, 1955. – 80 с.;
- "Необыкновенные" небесные явления. : Стенограмма публичной лекции... / Канд. пед. наук В. А. Шишаков. – Москва : [Знание], 1952. – 24 с.; 22 см. – (Серия 3/ Всесоюз. о-во по распространению полит. и науч. знаний);
- Солнечное затмение. / В. А. Шишаков, канд. пед. наук. – Москва : Знание, 1966. – 87 с. :
- Что надо делать, чтобы не было голода : (Простая беседа с крестьянами об улучшении сельского хозяйства) / В. Шишаков; Агитац. подотд. Воронежского губполитпросвета. – Воронеж : [б. и.], 1921. – 14 с.;
- Освоение космоса и религия : (Примерные планы лекций и факт. материалы) / К. А. Порцевский, В. А. Шишаков. – Москва : Знание, 1966. – 48 с.; 20 см. – (В помощь лектору/ Всесоюз. о-во "Знание". Науч.-метод. совет по пропаганде физ., матем. и астрон. знаний);
- Джордано Бруно. : Романтич. драма в 4 д. 9 карт. / Гр. Градов, В. Шишаков. – Москва : Изд. и стеклогр. изд-ва "Искусство", 1938. – 96 с.;
- Молебны и для чего попы их служат. / В. Шишаков; Центр. совет Союза воинств. безбожников. – Москва; Ленинград : Огиз – Моск. рабочий, 1931 (Л. : тип. им. Евг. Соколовой). – 48 с.;
- Религия и колхозное строительство. / В. Шишаков; Центральный совет воинствующих безбожников СССР. – Москва; Ленинград : Московский рабочий, 1931. – 80 с.;
- Самодельные астрономические приборы и инструменты. – Москва : Учпедгиз, 1956. – 56 с., 2 л. карт. : ил.;
- Наука и религия о строении и происхождении мира. : (Пояснит. текст к серии диапозитивов) / В. А. Шишаков; Центр. совет Союза воинств. безбожников. – Москва : 5 тип. Трансжелдориздата, 1936. – 16 с.;
- Простейший самодельный телескоп и наблюдения с ним. / В. А. Шишаков, канд. пед. наук; Моск. планетарий. – 2-е изд. – Москва : Тип. [Высш. парт. школы при ЦК ВКП(б)], 1947. – 72 с. : черт.;
- О кликушах и бесах. : (Правда ли, что кликуши одержимы бесами) / В. Шишаков; Центр. совет Союза воинствующих безбожников СССР. – Москва : Безбожник, 1930 (тип. изд-ва "Дер эмес"). – 48 с. : ил.;
- За коллективизацию против каркающего черного воронья! / В. Шишаков; Центр. совет Союза воинств. безбожников СССР. – [Москва] : [Огиз – Моск. рабочий], 1931 (13 тип. Огиза). – 15 с.;
- За социалистический урожай! За хлеб! За сырье фабрикам и заводам! Против религиозно-кулацкой контрреволюции! / В. Шишаков; Центр. совет Союза воинств. безбожников СССР. – [Москва] : [Огиз – Моск. рабочий], [1931] (тип. изд-ва "Дер эмес"). – 8 с.;
- О лунном затмении. [26 сент. 1931 г.] / В. Шишаков; Центр. совет союза воинств. безбожников СССР. – [Москва] : Огиз – Моск. рабочий, 1931 (13-я тип. Огиза). – 16 с.;
- Религия и колхозное строительство. / В. Шишаков; Центр. совет Союза воинств. безбожников СССР. – Москва; Ленинград : Огиз – Моск. рабочий, 1931 (М. : 13-я тип. Огиза). – 80 с.;
- Религия на службе капиталистических элементов в СССР. / В. Шишаков; Центр. совет Союза воинств. безбожников СССР. – Москва : Безбожник, 1931 (тип. изд-ва "Дер эмес"). – 37, [3] с.;
- Церковь и Октябрьская революция. / В. Шишаков; Центр. совет Союза воинств. безбожников СССР. – Москва : Безбожник, 1931 (тип. изд-ва "Дер эмес"). – 21, [3] с.;
- 20 портретов выдающихся ученых естествоиспытателей с краткими аннотациями. / Текст В. А. Шишакова. – [Москва] : Моск. планетарий, 1940. – 20 л. текста : портр.; 13×20 см + 20 отд. л. портр., вложен. в папку. (19×25) см. – (Борцы за научное мировоззрение; Серия 1);
- Необыкновенные небесные явления в свете науки и религии. : (Пояснит. текст к серии диапозитивов) / В. А. Шишаков; Центр. совет Союза воинств. безбожников СССР. – Москва : [тип.] Моск. полигр. ин-та, 1937. – 16 с.;
- Необыкновенные небесные явления в свете науки и религии. : (Пояснит. текст к серии диапозитивов) / В. А. Шишаков; Центр. совет Союза воинств. безбожников СССР. – Москва : изд. и тип. ф-ки No. 7 "Диафото", 1937. – 19 с.;
- Наука и религия о строении и происхождении мира. : (Пояснит. текст к сер. диапозитивов) / В. А. Шишаков; Центр. сов. Союза воинствующих безбожников СССР. – Москва : [б. и.], 1939. – 24 с.;
- Наука и религия о строении и развитии мира. : (Пояснительный текст к серии диапозитивов) / В. А. Шишаков; Центр. сов. союза воинствующих безбожников СССР. – Москва : [б. и.], 1939. – 26 с.;
- Кометы. / К. Л. Баев, В. А. Шишаков. – Москва : Гаиз, 1935 (тип. изд-ва "Гудок"). – Обл., 96 с. : ил.;
- Наука и религия о строении и происхождении мира. : (Пояснительный текст к серии диапозитивов) / В. А. Шишаков; Центр. сов. Союза воинствующих безбожников СССР. – Москва : [б. и.], 1938. – 19 с.;
- Небесные явления в свете науки. : (Поясн. текст к серии диапозитивов) / В. А. Шишаков; Центр. сов. союза воинствующих безбожников СССР. – Москва : [б. и.], 1938. – 18 с.;
- Начатки мироведения. / К. Л. Баев, В. А. Шишаков. – 2-е изд., перераб. – Москва; Ленинград : Гостехиздат, 1945 (М. : 16-я тип. треста "Полиграфкнига"). – 92 с., 1 л. портр. : ил., схем.;
- Стражи на времето. / В. Шишаков; Прев. от рус. Ив. Георгиев. – София : Народна просвета, 1961. – 61 с. : ил.; 16 см. – (Природонаучна библиотека. Серия "Физика и математика" Година 6. 12);
- Начатки мироведения. / К. Л. Баев и В. А. Шишаков. – 3-е изд., перераб. – Москва : Voenizdat, 1947. – 116 с. : ил.;
- Начатки мироведения. / К. Л. Баев, В. А. Шишаков. – 4-е изд., перераб. и доп. – Москва : Гостехиздат, 1954. – 124 с. : ил.;
- Начатки мироведения. / К. Л. Баев, В. А. Шишаков. – 5-е изд., стер. – Москва : Гостехиздат, 1955. – 124 с. : ил.;
- Начатки мироведения./ К. Л. Баев, В. А. Шишаков. – 6-е изд. – Москва : Физматгиз, 1958. – 128 с. : ил.;
- Как наука объясняет "необыкновенные" явления природы. : Краткий рекоменд. указатель литературы / В. А. Шишаков, Г. П. Богоявленский. – Москва : [б. и.], 1950. – 31 с.; 14 см. – (В помощь сельскому лектору/ Гос. ордена Ленина б-ка СССР им. В. И. Ленина);
- Происхождение религиозных обрядов и праздников. / В. А. Шишаков, И. Н. Узков. – [Москва] : Моск. рабочий, 1951. – 64 с.;
- Самодельные астрономические инструменты и наблюдения с ними. / И. Д. Новиков, В. А. Шишаков. – Москва : Наука, 1965. – 123 с., 1 отд. л. карт. : ил.;
- Начатки мироведения. / К. Л. Баев и В. А. Шишаков. – Москва; Ленинград : Гостехиздат, 1940. – 124 с., 1 вкл. л. портр. : ил., черт. и карт., портр.;
- Правда о небе. / К. Л. Баев и В. А. Шишаков. – Москва : ГАИЗ, 1940. – 88 с. : ил., портр. и черт.;
- Правда о небе. / К. Л. Баев и В. А. Шишаков. – [4-е изд.]. – Москва : ГАИЗ, 1941 (Тарту). – 72 с. : ил., черт.;
- Начатки мироведения. / К. Л. Баев и В. А. Шишаков. – [Молотов] : Молотовгиз, 1949 (8-я тип. Главполиграфиздата). – 104 с. : ил.;
- Всемирное тяготение. / Проф. К. Л. Баев, В. А. Шишаков. – Москва : Гостехиздат, 1956. – 40 с. : ил.;
- Правда о небе. / проф. К. Л. Баев и В. А. Шишаков. – Москва : ГАИЗ, 1939. – 44 с. : ил.;
- Луна. / Проф. К. Л. Баев и В. А. Шишаков. – Москва; Ленинград : Изд-во Акад. наук СССР, 1941 (Тарту). – 100 с. : ил., черт.;
- Науката и религията за строежа на вселената. / В. А. Шишаков; Прев. от рус. Цв. П. Цветанов. – София : Наука и изкуство, 1951. – 43 с.; 17 см. – (Научно-популярна библиотека);
- Было ли начало и будет ли конец мира. : Краткий обзор литературы. – Москва : [б. и.], 1950. – 28 с.; 14 см. – (В помощь сельскому лектору/ Гос. ордена Ленина б-ка СССР им. В. И. Ленина);
- Строение Вселенной. : Краткий обзор литературы. – Москва : [б. и.], 1950. – 46 с.; 14 см. – (В помощь сельскому лектору/ Гос. ордена Ленина б-ка СССР им. В. И. Ленина);
- Воскресшая икона. : Пьеса в 4 картинах... / В. Шишаков; Обложка: А. Короткин; Центр. совет Союза воинствующих безбожников СССР. – Москва : Безбожник, 1931 (тип. "Гудок"). – 47 с., [1] с. объявл. : портр.;
- Правда о небе. : (Простые беседы по астрономии) / К. Л. Баев, В. А. Шишаков; Ред. Р. Куницкий. – Москва : Гаиз, 1936 (тип. им. Сталина). – Обл., 68 с. : ил.;
- Великий русский ученый М. В. Ломоносов и его работы по астрономии. : Науч.-попул. лекция с метод. указаниями / Канд. пед. наук В. А. Шишаков; Всесоюз. о-во по распространению полит. и науч. знаний. – Москва : [Правда], 1951. – 31 с. : ил.;
- Методические советы лектору по темам: 1. Наука и религия о строении Вселенной. 2. Есть ли жизнь на других планетах. 3. "Необыкновенные" небесные явления. 4. Солнечные и лунные затмения. 5. Время и календарь. / Канд. пед. наук В. А. Шишаков; Всесоюз. о-во по распространению полит. и науч. знаний. – Москва : [б. и.], 1951. – 33 л.;
- Наука и религия о строении Вселенной. : Науч.-попул. лекция с метод. указаниями / В. А. Шишаков, канд. пед. наук; Всесоюз. о-во по распространению полит. и науч. знаний. – Москва : [Правда], 1950 (тип. им. Сталина). – 32 с.;
- Наука и религия о строении Вселенной. : Науч.-попул. лекция с метод. указаниями / В. А. Шишаков, канд. пед. наук; Всесоюз. о-во по распространению полит. и науч. знаний. – Москва : [Правда], 1950 (тип. им. Сталина). – 32 с.;
- Nagy orosz csillagászok. / V. A. Sisakov; Fordította: Gellért György. – Budapest : Művelt nép könyvkiadó, 1950. – 22 с. : ил.;
- Освоение космоса и религия. : (В помощь пропагандисту и агитатору) / Моск. гор. организация о-ва "Знание" РСФСР. Дом научного атеизма. – Москва : [б. и.], 1964. – 18 с.;
- Было ли начало и будет ли конец мира. : (Материалы к лекции) / Моск. гор. организация о-ва "Знание" РСФСР. Дом науч. атеизма. – Москва : [б. и.], 1966. – 17 с.;
- Опознай вселената. / К. Л. Баев, В. А. Шишаков; Прев. от рус. И. Люцканова. – София : Медицина и физкултура, 1960. – 129 с. : ил.; 20 см. – (Библиотека "Популярни технически знания");
- На чем земля держится. / проф. К. Л. Баев и В. А. Шишаков; Под ред. проф. Б. А. Воронцова-Вельяминова. – Москва; Ленинград : ОНТИ. Глав. ред. науч.-попул. и юношеской лит-ры, 1937 (Ленинград : тип. им. Евг. Соколовой). – Обл., 112, [2] с., 1 л. бланка-отзыва о книге : ил.; 19х13 см. – (Начатки знания);
- Наука и религия о строении вселенной. : Методическое пособие по проведению массовой научно-атеистической лекции / Канд. пед. наук В. А. Шишаков; Всесоюз. о-во по распространению полит. и науч. знаний. Науч.-метод. кабинет. – Москва : [б. и.], 1950. – 25 л.;
- Rola uczonych rosyjskich w rozwoju astronomii. / W. A. Szyszakow; Tłum. z rosyjskiego Wł. Zonn. – Wrocław : Czytelnik, 1950. – 20 с. : ил.; 23 см. – (Wiedza powszechna. Z cyklu: Astronomia w pierspektywie wieków / Wyd-wo popularno-naukowe; Zeszyt 6);
- Необыкновенные небесные явления в свете науки и религии. (Метеоры, кометы и затмения). : (Пояснит. текст к серии фотосерии) / Автор В. А. Шишаков; Ред. проф. К. Л. Баев; Центр. совет Союза воинств. безбожников СССР. – [Москва] : тип. "Диафото", [1936]. – 15 с.;
- На чем Земля держится. / К. Л. Баев, д-р физ.-мат. наук, В. А. Шишаков, канд. пед. наук; Моск. планетарий. – Москва : тип. [Высш. парт. школы при ЦК ВКП(б)], 1947. – 60 с. : ил.;
- Obloha a javy na oblohe. / V. A. Šišakov; Z rus. originálu prel. Ján Štefánik. – Martin : Osveta, 1954. – 110 с. : ил.; 20 см. – (Malá náučná knižnica; 108);
- О солнечном затмении 19 июня 1936 года. / Проф. К. Л. Баев, В. А. Шишаков; Под ред. проф. А. А. Михайлова. – Москва; Ленинград : Онти. Глав. ред. науч.-попул. и юношеской лит-ры, 1936 (Л. : тип. им. Евг. Соколовой). – Обл., 42, [2] с. : ил.; 20х13 см. – (Научные беседы выходного дня);
- Всемирное тяготение. / Проф. К. Л. Баев, В. А. Шишаков; Под ред. д-ра физ.-матем. наук проф. П. П. Паренаго. – Москва : тип. "Известий", 1945. – 53 с. : ил.; 20 см. – (Серия популярных брошюр по астрономии/ Моск. планетарий);
- Необыкновенные небесные явления в свете науки и религии. (Метеоры, кометы и затмения). : (Пояснит. текст к серии диапозитивов) / Автор В. А. Шишаков; Ред. проф. К. Л. Баев; Ф-ка "Диафото" Главучтехпром. Центр. совет Союза воинств. безбожников СССР. – [Москва] : тип. "Диафото", [1936]. – 15 с.;
- Основные вопросы мироведения. : Рекомендательные списки литературы в помощь самообразованию / Сост.: В. А. Шишаков, канд. пед. наук; Всесоюз. о-во по распространению полит. и науч. знаний. Центр. политехн. б-ка. – Москва : [б. и.], 1949. – 18 с.;
- Творцы астрономии. / Проф. К. Л. Баев, В. А. Шишаков; Под ред. члена корреспондента Акад. наук СССР проф. С. Н. Блажко. – Москва; Ленинград : Онти. Глав. ред. науч.-попул. и юношеской лит-ры, 1936 (Л. : тип. им. Евг. Соколовой). – Обл., 158 с. : ил.; 19х13 см. – (Научные беседы выходного дня);
- A világegyetemről. / K. L. Bajev és V. A. Sisakov; Ford. Czitrom Janos. – [Bukarest] : Orosz könyv, 1956. – 166 с. : ил.;
- Iniţiere in ştiinţa despre univers. / K. L. Baev şi V. A. Şişakov; Trad. de I. Gprenstein. – București : Cartea rusă, 1956. – 164 p. : il.; 17 см. – (Ştiinţă pentru toţi; 103);
- Věda a náboženství o stavbě vesmíru [Текст] / V. A. Šišakov; Z rus. přel. dr. Jan Souček s dr. Karlem Třískou. – Praha : Osvěta, 1951. – 61 с.; 71 см. – (Vědění všem; Sv. 29);
- A vallási szokások és szertartások. / Sisakov és Szkvorcov-Sztyepanov; Ford. Terényi István és Szabó Tamás. – Budapest : Szikra, 1956. – 127 old.

=== Translations ===
- Гольбах, Поль Анри Дитрих. Религия и здравый смысл / П. Гольбах; Под ред. В. А. Шишакова. – Москва : Атеист, 1924. – IV, 126, [1] с. : ил.;
- Мелье, Жан. Завещание / Иоанн Мелье (по Вольтеру); Под. ред. В. А. Шишакова. – Москва : Атеист, 1924. – 32 с.;
- Таксиль, Лео. Занимательная библия / Лео Таксиль; Пер. с франц. под ред. и доп. В. Шишакова. – [Москва] : Атеист, [1925]. – 1928;
  - Таксиль, Лео. Занимательная библия / Лео Таксиль; Пер. с франц. под ред. и с прим. В. Шишакова; Иллюстрации: В. А. Тривас. – 2-е изд. – [Москва] : Атеист, [1930] (Рязань : Рязгостип). – 445, [3] с.;
  - Таксиль, Лео. Забавная библия : [Пер. с фр.] / Под ред. [и предисл.] В. Шишакова. – [Москва] : [Госполитиздат], [1961]. – 471 с. : ил.;
  - Таксиль, Лео. Забавная библия : [Пер. с фр.] / [Предисл. В. Шишакова]. – Москва : Политиздат, 1965. – 447 с.;
  - Таксиль, Лео. Забавная библия : [Пер. с фр.] / Лео Таксиль; [Вступ. статья и примеч. канд. филос. наук М. С. Беленького]. – 3-е изд. – Москва : Политиздат, 1976. – 431 с.; 20 см. – (Б-ка атеистической литературы);
  - Таксиль, Лео. Забавная Библия : [Пер. с фр.] / Лео Таксиль. – Минск : Беларусь, 1988. – 413,[1] с.; 21 см.; ISBN 5-338-00020-2 (В пер.);
  - Таксиль, Лео. Забавная библия : [Пер. с фр.] / Лео Таксиль. – Красноярск : Изд-во Краснояр. гос. ун-та, 1991. – 463,[1] с. : ил.; 20 см.; ISBN 5-7470-0103-5;
  - Таксиль, Лео. Забавная Библия : рус. изд. / Лео Таксиль. – Москва : Рус. Правда, 2006 (М. : Щербинская типография). – 319 с. : портр.; 21 см.; ISBN 5-901275-07-1;
  - Таксиль, Лео. Забавная Библия [Текст] : русское издание / Лео Таксиль. – Москва : Рус. Правда, 2013. – 319 с. : портр.; 22 см.; ISBN 978-5-901275-07-8.
- Таксиль, Лео. Занимательное евангелие. Т. 1-2 = La vie de Jesus / Лео Таксиль; Пер. с франц. под ред. В. Шишакова; С ил. Д. Моора. – [Москва] : Атеист, [1929] (Л. : гос. тип. им. Евг. Соколовой). – 2 т.;
  - Таксиль, Лео. Забавное евангелие, или Жизнь Иисуса = La vie de Jesus : [Пер. фр.]. – Москва : Политиздат, 1963. – 429 с.;
  - Таксиль, Лео. Забавное евангелие, или Жизнь Иисуса : [пер. фр.]. – Москва : Политиздат, 1964. – 429 с.;
  - Таксиль, Лео. Забавное евангелие, или Жизнь Иисуса : [Пер. с. фр.]. – Москва : Политиздат, 1965. – 464 с.;
  - Таксиль, Лео. Забавное евангелие, или Жизнь Иисуса : Пер. с фр. / Лео Таксиль; [Общ. ред., вступ. статья и примеч. канд. ист. наук М.М. Кубланова]. – Москва : Политиздат, 1977. – 447 с. : ил.; 20 см. – (Библиотека атеистической литературы);
  - Таксиль, Лео. Забавное евангелие, или Жизнь Иисуса : [Пер. с фр.]. – Минск : Беларусь, 1989. – 382, [1] с.;
  - Таксиль, Лео. Забавное евангелие или Жизнь Иисуса Христа : [перевод] / Лео Таксиль. – Москва; Минск : Русская Правда, 2008. – 319 с. : ил., портр.

== Notes ==
- Виталий Алексеевич Шишаков
- Легенды Планетария. Виталий Алексеевич Шишаков (1893 – 1972 гг.)
