= Anti-Masonry =

Opposition to Freemasonry

Anti-Masonry (alternatively called anti-Freemasonry) is "avowed opposition to Freemasonry", which has led to multiple forms of religious discrimination, violent persecution, and suppression in some countries as well as in various organized religions (primarily Abrahamic religions).

== Early anti-Masonic documents ==
The earliest known anti-Masonic document was a leaflet which was printed in 1698 by a Presbyterian minister who was named Winter. It reads:

TO ALL GODLY PEOPLE, In the Citie of London.

Having thought it needful to warn you of the Mischiefs and Evils practiced in the Sight of God by those called Freed Masons, I say take Care lest their Ceremonies and secret Swearings take hold of you; and be wary that none cause you to err from Godliness. For this devilish Sect of Men are Meeters in secret which swear against all without ther Following. They are the Anti Christ which was to come leading Men from Fear of God. For how should Men meet in secret Places and with secret Signs taking Care that none observed them to do the Work of GOD; are not these the Ways of Evil-doers?

Knowing how that God observeth privilly them that sit in Darkness they shall be smitten and the Secrets of their Hearts layed bare. Mingle not among this corrupt People lest you be found so at the World's Conflagration.

== Political anti-Masonry ==
Freemasonry has been alleged to hold its members back from fully committing themselves to their nation. Critics claim that, compared to Operative Masonry's clear denunciations of treachery, Speculative Masonry (Freemasonry after 1723) was far more ambiguous. The old Catholic Encyclopedia alleges that Masonic disapproval of treachery is not on moral grounds but on the grounds of inconvenience to other Masons. It also argues that the adage "Loyalty to freedom overrides all other considerations" justifies treason, and quotes Albert Mackey, who said "... if treason or rebellion were masonic crimes, almost every mason in the United Colonies (America), in 1776, would have been subject to expulsion and every Lodge to a forfeiture of its warrant by the Grand Lodges of England and Scotland, under whose jurisdiction they were at the time".

Freemasonry charges its members that: "In the state you are to be a quiet and peaceful subject, true to your government and just to your country; You are not to countenence disloyalty or rebellion, but patiently submit to legal authority and conform with cheerfulness to the government of the country in which you live."

Freemasonry was persecuted in all the communist countries. Freemasonry in Cuba continued to exist following the Cuban Revolution, and according to Cuban folklore, Fidel Castro is said to have "developed a soft spot for the Masons when they gave him refuge in a Masonic Lodge" in the 1950s. When in power, Castro was also said to have "kept them on a tight leash" as they were considered a subversive element in Cuban society and allegedly providing safe haven for dissidents.

Fascists treated Freemasonry as a potential source of opposition. Masonic writers state that the language used by the totalitarian regimes is similar to that used by other modern critics of Freemasonry.

=== United States ===
In 1826, William Morgan disappeared from the small town of Batavia, New York. He was alleged to be kidnapped by Freemasons and murdered after threatening to expose Freemasonry's secrets by publishing its rituals. Morgan's disappearance sparked a series of protests and suspicion against Freemasonry, which eventually spread to the political realm. Under the leadership of anti-Masonic Thurlow Weed, an Anti-Jacksonist movement became (since Jackson was a Mason) the Anti-Masonic Party. This political party ran presidential candidates in the elections of 1828 and 1832, but by 1835 the party had disbanded everywhere except Pennsylvania. William A. Palmer of Vermont and Joseph Ritner of Pennsylvania were both elected governor of their respective states on anti-Masonic platforms.

John Quincy Adams, President of the United States during the Morgan Affair, objected to the oath of secrecy, particularly with regard to the keeping of undefined secrets and to the penalties for breaking the oath. He declared, "Masonry ought forever to be abolished. It is wrong – essentially wrong – a seed of evil which can never produce any good," although he extended "the most liberal of tolerance" to Masons who joined the fraternity before the murder of William Morgan, saying that they were taken by surprise and that they took the Oaths "without reflecting upon what they imported, or sheltering their consciences under the great names which had gone before them."

Though few states passed laws directed at Freemasonry by name, laws regulating and restricting it were passed and many cases dealing with Freemasonry were seen in the courts. Antimasonic legislation was passed in Vermont in 1833, including a provision by which the giving and willing taking of an unnecessary oath was made a crime. (Pub. Stat., sec. 5917), and the state of New York enacted a Benevolent Orders Law to regulate such organizations.

=== Asia ===
In 1938, a Japanese representative to the Welt-Dienst / World-Service congress hosted by Ulrich Fleischhauer stated, on behalf of Japan, that "Judeo-Masonry is forcing the Chinese to turn China into a spearhead for an attack on Japan, and thereby forcing Japan to defend itself against this threat. Japan is at war not with China but with Freemasonry (Tiandihui), represented by General Chiang Kai-shek, the successor of his master, the Freemason Sun Yat-sen."

=== Europe ===
According to Simon Sarlin, and Dan Rouyer, intense denunciation of Freemasonry because of its supposed grip on society and government, became standard doctrine within counter-revolutionary thought and action in the 19th century. A major event was The International Anti-Masonic Congress that took place in Trento, Italy in 1896. It was sponsored by Pope Leo XIII and the Austro-Hungarian Emperor Francis-Joseph, a Catholic. The Congress assembled 1,500 delegates and 300 journalists, as well as prominent Catholic bishops. Thousands of telegrams testified to support from the right worldwide. It created a permanent body, the "Universal Anti-Masonic Union." The goal was to create a powerful centre for all anti-Masonic groups, strengthening their resolve and capabilities to battle the Freemasons nation by nation. In practice the Union was too conspicuously Papal, and poorly organized. It proved ineffective in its grandiose expectations but its creation was a measure of bitter anger and frustration among the Catholic enemies of Freemasonry.

==== Finland ====
The far-right groups exercised considerable political power in Finland in the 1930s and 40s, pressuring the government to expel Freemasons from the armed forces. Patriotic Citizens of Viitasaari wanted to purge Jews and Freemasons from the country and spread anti-Masonic booklets in the prints of tens of thousands. Patriotic People's Movement MP Paavo Susitaival was a prominent opponent of freemasonry and claimed freemasons were responsible for ritual murders.

==== Soviet Union ====
The Soviet Union definitively outlawed Freemasonry in 1922. At one of the Second International meetings, Grigory Zinoviev demanded to purge it of masons. Freemasonry did not exist in the other Marxist–Leninist states. Post-war revivals of Freemasonry in Czechoslovakia and Hungary were suppressed in 1950.

==== Fascist Italy ====
Benito Mussolini decreed in 1924 that every member of his Fascist Party who was a Mason must abandon either one or the other organization, and in 1925, he dissolved Freemasonry in Italy, claiming that it was a political organization. One of the most prominent Fascists, General Luigi Capello, who had also been Deputy Grand Master of the Grande Oriente, Italy's leading Grand Lodge, gave up his membership in the Fascist Party rather than in Masonry. He later took part in a failed attempt to murder Mussolini and was sentenced to 30 years in jail, though he was released after 9 years of prison.

==== Hungary ====
In 1919, Béla Kun proclaimed the dictatorship of the proletariat in Hungary and Masonic lodges were closed. After the fall of the dictatorship of the proletariat, leaders of the counter-revolution such as Miklós Horthy blamed the Hungarian freemasons for their First World War defeat and for the revolution. Masonry was outlawed by a decree in 1920. This marked the start of raids by army officers on Masonic lodges along with theft, and sometimes destruction, of Masonic libraries, records, archives, paraphernalia, and works of art. Several Masonic buildings were seized and used for anti-Masonic exhibitions. The masonic documents were archived, preserved and may still be used for research.

In post-war Hungary, lodges were re-established, but after five years, the government described them as "meeting places of the enemies of the people's democratic republic, of capitalistic elements, and of the adherents of Western imperialism". They were banned again in 1950.

==== Nazi Germany and occupied Europe ====
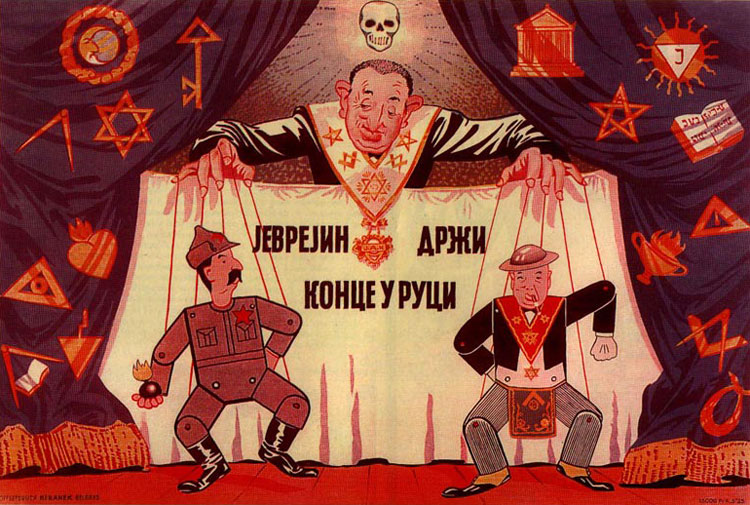
Propaganda poster of the Grand Anti-Masonic Exhibition in Belgrade during the Nazi German occupation of Serbia

Freemasons were consistently considered an ideological foe of Nazism in their world perception (Weltanschauung). The Nazis claimed that high-degree Masons were willing members of the Jewish conspiracy and that Freemasonry was one of the causes of Germany's defeat in World War I. In Mein Kampf, Adolf Hitler wrote that "Freemasonry has succumbed to the Jews and has become an excellent instrument to fight for their aims and to use their strings to pull the upper strata of society into their designs". He continued, "The general pacifistic paralysis of the national instinct of self-preservation begun by Freemasonry" is then transmitted to the masses of society by the press. In 1933 Hermann Göring, the Reichstag President and one of the key figures in the process of Gleichschaltung ("synchronization"), stated "in National Socialist Germany, there is no place for Freemasonry".

The red triangle, the symbol used to mark Freemasons

The Enabling Act (Ermächtigungsgesetz in German) was passed by Germany's parliament (the Reichstag) on March 23, 1933. Using the Act, on January 8, 1934, the German Ministry of the Interior ordered the disbandment of Freemasonry, and confiscation of the property of all Lodges; stating that those who had been members of Lodges when Hitler came to power, in January 1933, were prohibited from holding office in the Nazi party or its paramilitary arms, and were ineligible for appointment in public service. Consistently considered an ideological foe of Nazism in their world perception (Weltauffassung), special sections of the Security Service (SD) and later the Reich Security Main Office (RSHA) were established to deal with Freemasonry. Masonic concentration camp inmates were graded as political prisoners, and wore an inverted (point down) red triangle.

On August 8, 1935, as Führer and Chancellor, Adolf Hitler announced in the Nazi Party newspaper, Völkischer Beobachter, the final dissolution of all Masonic Lodges in Germany. The article accused a conspiracy of the Fraternity and World Jewry of seeking to create a World Republic. In 1937 Joseph Goebbels inaugurated an "Anti-Masonic Exposition" to display objects seized by the state. The Ministry of Defence forbade officers from becoming Freemasons, with officers who remained as Masons being sidelined.

During the war, Freemasonry was banned by edict in all countries that were either allied with the Nazis or under Nazi control, including Norway and France. Anti-Masonic exhibitions were held in many occupied countries. Field-Marshal Friedrich Paulus was denounced as a "High-grade Freemason" when he surrendered to the Soviet Union in 1943.

In 1943, the Propaganda Abteilung, a delegation of Nazi Germany's propaganda ministry within occupied France, commissioned the propaganda film Forces occultes. The film virulently denounces Freemasonry, parliamentarianism and Jews as part of Vichy's drive against them and seeks to prove a Jewish-Masonic plot. The Freemasons were accused of conspiring with Jews and Anglo-American nations to encourage France into a war with Germany.

The preserved records of the RSHA—i.e., Reichssicherheitshauptamt or the Office of the High Command of Security Service, which pursued the racial objectives of the SS through the Race and Resettlement Office—document the persecution of Freemasons. The number of Freemasons from Nazi occupied countries who were killed is not accurately known, but it is estimated that between 80,000 and 200,000 Freemasons were murdered under the Nazi regime. The Government of the United Kingdom established Holocaust Memorial Day to recognise all groups who were targets of the Nazi regime, and counter Holocaust denial. Freemasons are listed as being among those who were targeted.

==== Francoist Spain ====
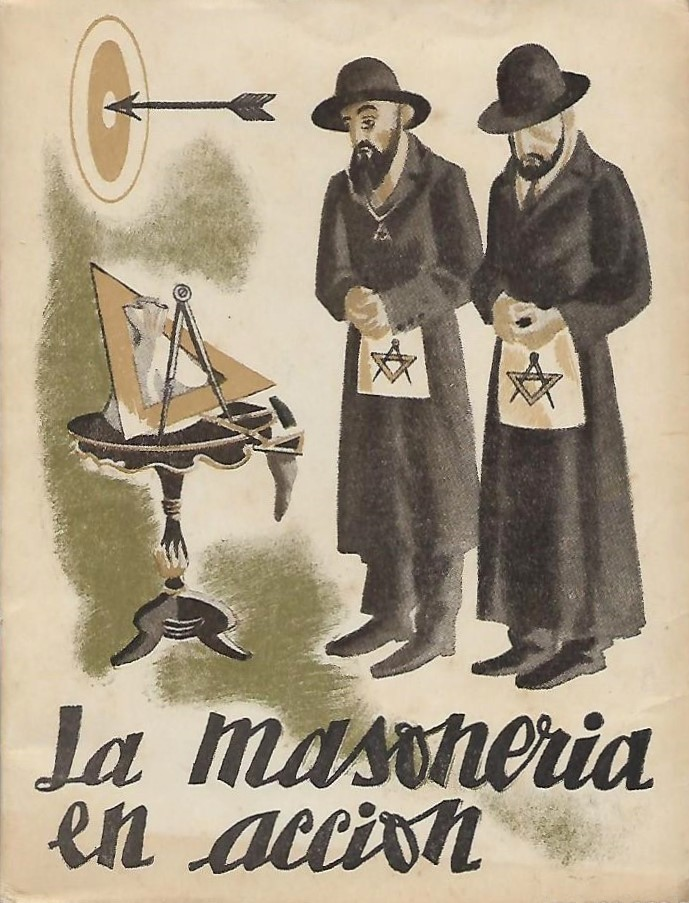
"Freemasonry in Action", anti-Masonic and antisemitic pamphlet published in Madrid in 1941

It is claimed that the dictator Miguel Primo de Rivera ordered the abolition of Freemasonry in Spain. In September 1928, one of the two Grand Lodges in Spain was closed and approximately two-hundred masons, most notably the Grand Master of the Grand Orient, were imprisoned for allegedly plotting against the government.

Following the military coup of 1936, many Freemasons trapped in areas under Nationalist control were arrested and summarily killed in the White Terror, along with members of left wing parties and trade unionists. It was reported that Masons were tortured, garroted, shot, and murdered by organized death squads in every town in Spain. At this time one of the most rabid opponents of Freemasonry, Father Juan Tusquets Terrats, began to work for the Nationalists with the task of exposing masons. One of his close associates was Franco's personal chaplain, and over the next two years, these two men assembled a huge index of 80,000 suspected masons, even though there were little more than 5,000 masons in Spain. The lodge building in Cordoba was burnt, the Masonic Temple of Santa Cruz de Tenerife in the Canary Islands was confiscated and transformed into the headquarters of the Falange, and another was shelled by artillery. In Salamanca thirty members of one lodge were shot, including a priest. Similar atrocities occurred across the country: fifteen masons were shot in Logroño, seventeen in Ceuta, thirty-three in Algeciras, and thirty in Valladolid, among them the Civil Governor. Few towns escaped the carnage as Freemasons in Lugo, Zamora, Cádiz and Granada were brutally rounded up and shot, and in Seville, the entire membership of several lodges were butchered. The slightest suspicion of being a mason was often enough to earn a place in a firing squad, and the blood-letting was so fierce that, reportedly, some masons were even hurled into working engines of steam trains. By 16 December 1937, according to the annual masonic assembly held in Madrid, all masons that had not escaped from the areas under nationalist control had been murdered.

After the victory of dictator General Francisco Franco, Freemasonry was officially outlawed in Spain on 2 March 1940. Being a mason was automatically punishable by a minimum jail term of 12 years. Masons of the 18º and above were deemed guilty of "Aggravated Circumstances", and usually faced the death penalty.

According to Francoists, the Republican Regime which Franco overthrew had a strong Masonic presence. In reality Spanish Masons were present in all sectors of politics and the armed forces. At least four of the Generals who supported Franco's rebellion were Masons, although many lodges contained fervent but generally conservative Republicans. Freemasonry was formally outlawed in the Law for the Repression of Freemasonry and Communism. After Franco's decree outlawing masonry, Franco's supporters were given two months to resign from any lodge they might be a member. Many masons chose to go into exile instead, including prominent monarchists who had whole-heartedly supported the Nationalist rebellion in 1936. The common components in Spanish Masonry seems to have been upper or middle class conservative liberalism and strong anti-clericalism.

The Law for the Repression of Freemasonry and Communism was not abrogated until 1963. References to a "Judeo-Masonic plot" are a standard component of Francoist speeches and propaganda and reveal the intense and paranoid obsession of the dictator with masonry. Franco produced at least 49 pseudonymous anti-masonic magazine articles and an anti-masonic book during his lifetime. According to Franco:

The whole secret of the campaigns unleashed against Spain can be explained in two words: masonry and communism ... we have to extirpate these two evils from our land.

===== The re-created "Masonic lodge" in Salamanca =====
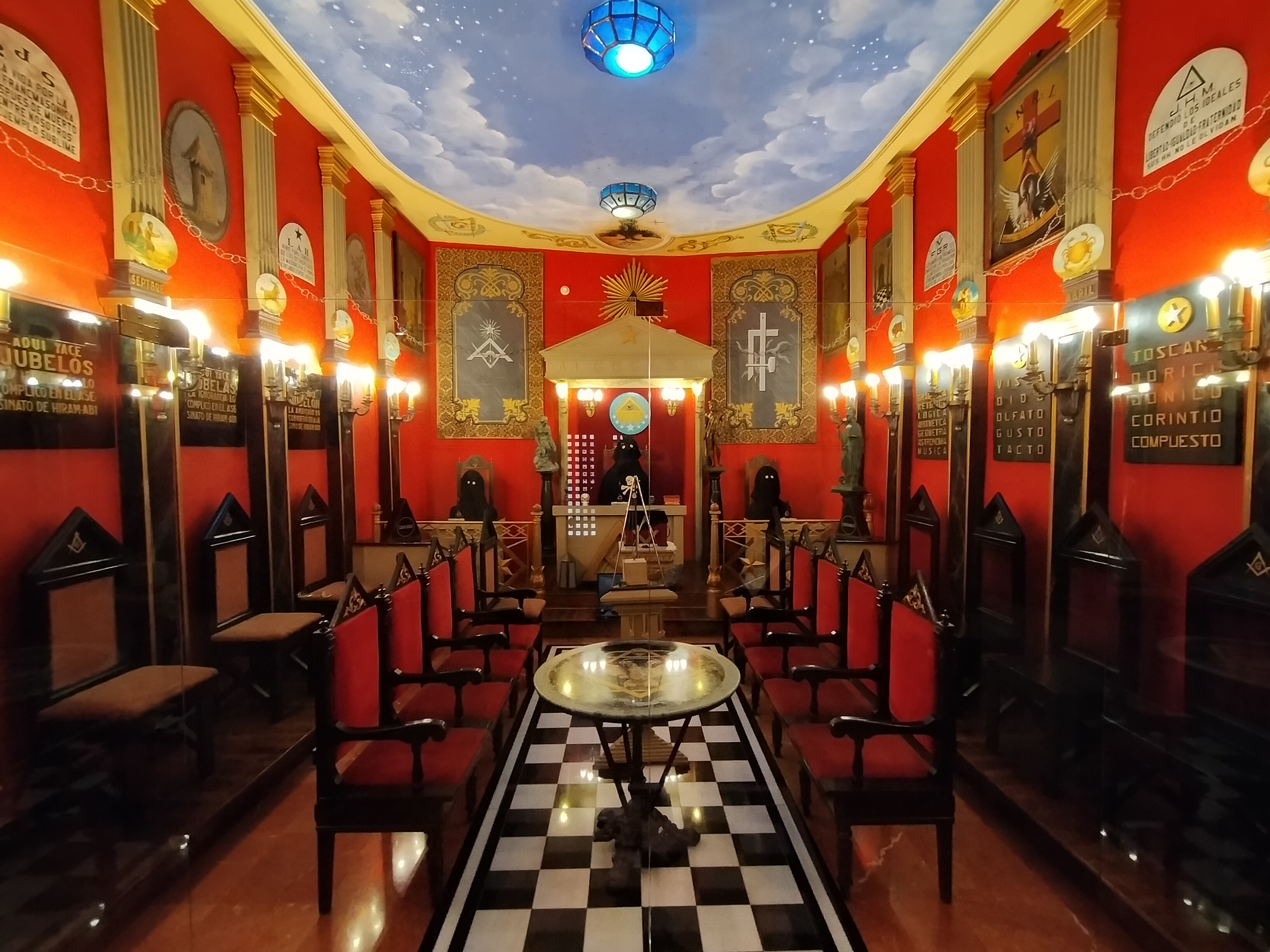
The re-created lodge.

The National Delegation for Special Affairs (Delegación Nacional de Asuntos Especiales) and the State Delegation for the Recovery of Documents (Delegación del Estado para la Recuperación de Documentos) were founded in 1937 to collect documentation and paraphernalia from Freemasons, Freethinkers, Protestants and Rotarians. They were unified in 1944 as the National Delegation of Document Services (Delegación Nacional de Servicios Documentales, DNSD,) under Carlist Marcelino Ulibarri Eguilaz. Also the Theosophists and the League for Man's Rights were targeted. Besides supporting the cases against Freemasons, the DNSD also tried to "educate" and propagandize against Freemasonry. A lodge exhibit was re-created within the General Archive of the Spanish Civil War in Salamanca with the seized furnishings. It is open to visitors since the 1990s. Part of the display is a jumble mixing instruments of different ceremonies to ridicule and present the organization as something sinister. It also includes original pieces. It is kept as a display of anti-Masonry in Spain, but visitors may misunderstand it.

==== United Kingdom ====
It was the Unlawful Societies Act 1799 that saw the first statute "for the more effectual suppression of societies established for seditious and treasonable purposes"; once enacted it affected all societies whose members were required to take an oath not authorised by law, shall be deemed "unlawful combinations." It was as a result of the intervention of the Grand Master of the Antients, The 4th Duke of Atholl, and the Acting Grand Master of the Moderns, the Earl of Moira that a special exempting clause was inserted into this legislation in favour of societies "held under the Denomination of Lodges of Freemasons" provided that they had been "usually held before the Act" and their names, places and times of meeting and the names of the members were annually registered with the local clerk to the justices of the peace. This continued on until this act was repealed by a section of the Criminal Justice Act 1967 which meant that the annual returns of all the Lodges to the authorities ceased.

In the United Kingdom, anti-Masonic sentiment grew following the publication of Martin Short's 1989 book, Inside the Brotherhood (Further Secrets of the Freemasons). The allegations made by Short led several members of the British Government, since 1997, to propose laws requiring Freemasons who join the police or judiciary to declare their membership publicly to the government amid accusations of Freemasons performing acts of mutual advancement and favour-swapping. This movement was initially led by Jack Straw, Home Secretary from 1997 until 2001. In 1999, the Welsh Assembly became the only body in the United Kingdom to place a legal requirement on membership declaration for Freemasons. Currently, existing members of the police and judiciary in England are asked to voluntarily admit to being Freemasons. However, all first time successful judiciary candidates had to "declare their freemasonry status" before appointment until 2009, when – following a successful challenge in the European Court by Italian Freemasons – Jack Straw accepted that the policy was "disproportionate" and revoked it. Conversely, new members of the police are not required to declare their status.

In 2004, Rhodri Morgan, the First Minister of the Welsh Assembly, said that he blocked Gerard Elias' appointment to counsel general because of links to hunting and Freemasonry, although it was claimed by non-Labour politicians that the real reason was in order to have a Labour supporter, Malcolm Bishop, in the role.

== Religious anti-Masonry ==
=== Muslim anti-Masonry ===
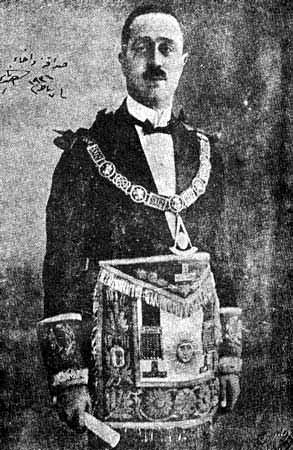
Ottoman noble Ahmad Nami dressed in full Masonic attire in 1925

Islamic criticism and opposition to Freemasonry has existed since the introduction of the latter in the Muslim world in the 18th century. After the condemnation of Freemasonry by Pope Clement XII in 1738, Sultan Mahmud I followed suit outlawing the organization and since that time Freemasonry was equated with atheism in the Ottoman Empire and the broader Islamic world. The Islamic anti-Masonic opposition in the Muslim world has been reinforced by the anti-clerical and atheistic slant of the Grand Orient of France.

By the middle of the 19th century, Freemasonry and its semi-secret organizational structures were able to establish lodges predominantly among those populations living in the Ottoman Empire and its provinces (Egypt, Lebanon, Syria, Cyprus, and Macedonia). This began about 15 years after the declaration of 1839 Reform Edicts and Freemasonry became successful in the Ottoman Empire under the reigns of sultans Abdulmejid (1839–1861), Abdulaziz (1861–1876) and Abdul Hamid II (1876–1909). During the 19th century, numerous prominent Muslim scholars, thinkers, and politicians, such as 'Abd al-Qadir al-Jaza'iri (1808–1883), Jamal al-Din Afghani (1839–1897), and Riza Tevfik (1869–1949) were active in Freemasonry. Other notable scholars, intellectuals, and politicians who became Freemasons included Sa'd Zaghlul, Ya'qib Sannu', Adib Ishaq, Tawfiq Pasha, and the influential Islamic jurist and theologian Muhammad 'Abduh.

Many contemporary Islamic anti-Masonic arguments are closely tied to both antisemitism and anti-Zionism, though other reasons for the Muslim anti-Masonry have been formulated, such as linking Freemasonry to conspiracy theories and Islamic eschatology, in particular to the eschatological figure of the Dajjal (the Islamic Antichrist). During the early 20th century, the Syrian-Egyptian Islamic theologian Mūhammād Rashīd Ridâ (1865–1935) played the crucial role in leading the opposition to Freemasonry across the Muslim world. Through his popular pan-Islamic journal Al-Manār, Rida spread antisemitic and anti-Masonic ideas which would directly influence the Muslim Brotherhood and subsequent radical Islamic and Islamist movements, such as Hamas (see Hamas Charter).

The Egyptian newspaper Al-Manār, belonging to Muhammad Rashid Rida, played a critical role in spreading these conspiracy theories. Rida was the leading pan-Islamic activist of that age, a significant intellectual influence on Hassan al-Banna, the founder of the Muslim Brotherhood. In his articles, Rida maintained that the Jews stood behind the Young Turk revolution in the Ottoman Empire in 1908 and had also orchestrated the French Revolution of 1789 and the 1905 rebellion in Russia. Rida also believed that the Jews were planning to take over Al-Aqsa Mosque and expel the Muslim and Christian inhabitants of the Holy Land. Rida’s mix of European conspiratorial thought and political Islam left a lasting mark.

Influenced by Rida, the Muslim Brotherhood holds to antisemitic conspiracy theories in which freemasonry is seen as a form of Jewish subversion. In article 28 of its Charter, Hamas states that Freemasonry, Rotary, and other similar groups "work in the interest of Zionism and according to its instructions." On July 15, 1978, the Islamic Jurisdictional College—one of the most influential entities that interpret Sharia, or Islamic law—issued an opinion that deemed Freemasonry to be "dangerous" and "clandestine".

Many countries with a significant Muslim population do not allow Masonic establishments within their jurisdictions. After World War II, while under the British Mandate, Iraq used to have several Masonic lodges. This all changed with the 14 July Revolution in 1958, however, with the abolition of the Hashemite monarchy and Iraq's declaration as a republic. The licenses permitting lodges to meet were rescinded, and later, laws were introduced banning any further meetings. This position was later reinforced under Saddam Hussein. In 1980, the Iraqi legal and penal code was changed, making it a felony to "promote or acclaim Zionist principles, including freemasonry, or who associate [themselves] with Zionist organizations." Also, Freemasonry was banned in Egypt in 1964 by the order of President Nasser and in 1965 the Ba'athist government of Syria banned all lodges.

However, a few countries such as Turkey and Morocco have allowed establishment of Grand Lodges while in countries such as Malaysia and Lebanon, there are District Grand Lodges operating under a warrant from an established Grand Lodge. In addition, according to some sources, King Hussein of Jordan was a Freemason himself.

=== Christian anti-Masonry ===
One of the first highly vocal Christian critics of freemasonry was Charles Finney. In his book The Character, Claims, and Practical Workings of Freemasonry, Finney not only ridiculed the masons, he also explained why he viewed leaving the society as an essential act three years after he entered seminary.

A number of Protestant and Eastern Orthodox denominations discourage their congregants from joining Masonic lodges, but this practice differs in intensity according to the beliefs of the denomination. Some denominations simply express mild concern about Freemasonry because they do not believe that it is compatible with the teachings of Christianity while, at the other extreme, other denominations openly accuse the fraternity of worshipping Satan, by quoting the writings of Leo Taxil and Abel Clarin de la Rive.

Since 1738, the Roman Catholic Church has prohibited its members from joining Masonic organizations, citing political as well as religious reasons. Until 1983, the penalty for Catholics who joined the fraternity was excommunication. Since that time, the punishment has been an interdict, barring the offender from receiving Holy Communion. Even though the canonical penalty was changed in 1983, the prohibition on membership has not been changed.

== Conspiracy theories ==
There have long been conspiracy theories concerning Freemasonry in which the organization is either bent on world domination or it is already covertly in control of world politics.

The earliest document which accused Freemasonry of being involved in a conspiracy was Enthüllungen des Systems der Weltbürger-Politik ("Disclosure of the System of Cosmopolitan Politics"), published in 1786. The book claimed that Freemasons and Jesuits were plotting to foment a world revolution. During the 19th century, this theory was repeated by many Christian counter-revolutionaries, who accused Freemasons of being behind every attack on the existing social system.

== See also ==
- Abel Clarin de la Rive
- Anti-Catholicism
- Anti-clericalism
- Anti-Protestantism
- Humanum genus 1884 Papal Encyclical against Masonry
- Judeo-Masonic conspiracy theory
- Mormonism and Freemasonry
- New World Order (conspiracy theory)
- Propaganda Due – The P2 pseudo-Masonic Lodge Scandal
- Secret society
- Taxil hoax
