= Taxil hoax =

1890s hoax of exposure by Léo Taxil

Poster advertising the work of Leo Taxil

The Taxil hoax was an 1890s hoax of exposure by Léo Taxil, intended to mock not only Freemasonry but also the Catholic Church's opposition to it. Taxil, the author of an anti-papal tract, pretended to convert to Catholicism (circa 1884) and wrote several volumes, purportedly in the service to his new faith. These included the adventures of one Dr. Bataille, a surgeon serving in the French merchant navy who has infiltrated the Freemasons and observes their evil rituals as they occur all over the world. Buddhists, Hindus, and Spiritualists were alleged to join with Freemasons in conspiring against the Catholic Church, and Bataille uncovers a secret inner order within the Masons called the Palladists, who take their orders directly from demons. As Dr. Bataille's tale unfolds, he introduces Diana Vaughan, a former high priestess of Palladism who has converted to Catholicism and is in grave danger of assassination from vengeful Freemasons.

In 1897, Taxil called a press conference at which he promised to produce Vaughan. Instead he declared that his revelations about the Freemasons were invented. Nine years later he told an American magazine how he initially assumed readers would recognize his tales as "amusement pure and simple" and too outlandish to be true. But when he realized the stories were believed by many, Taxil decided there was "lots of money" to be made in publishing the stories and he continued to perpetrate the hoax.

== Taxil and Freemasonry ==
Léo Taxil was the pen name of Marie Joseph Gabriel Antoine Jogand-Pagès, who had been accused earlier of libel regarding a book he wrote called The Secret Loves of Pope Pius IX. On April 20, 1884, Pope Leo XIII published an encyclical, Humanum genus, that said that the human race was:

separated into two diverse and opposite parts, of which the one steadfastly contends for truth and virtue, the other of those things which are contrary to virtue and to truth. The one is the kingdom of God on earth, namely, the true Church of Jesus Christ... The other is the kingdom of Satan... At this period, however, the partisans of evil seems to be combining together, and to be struggling with united vehemence, led on or assisted by that strongly organized and widespread association called the Freemasons.

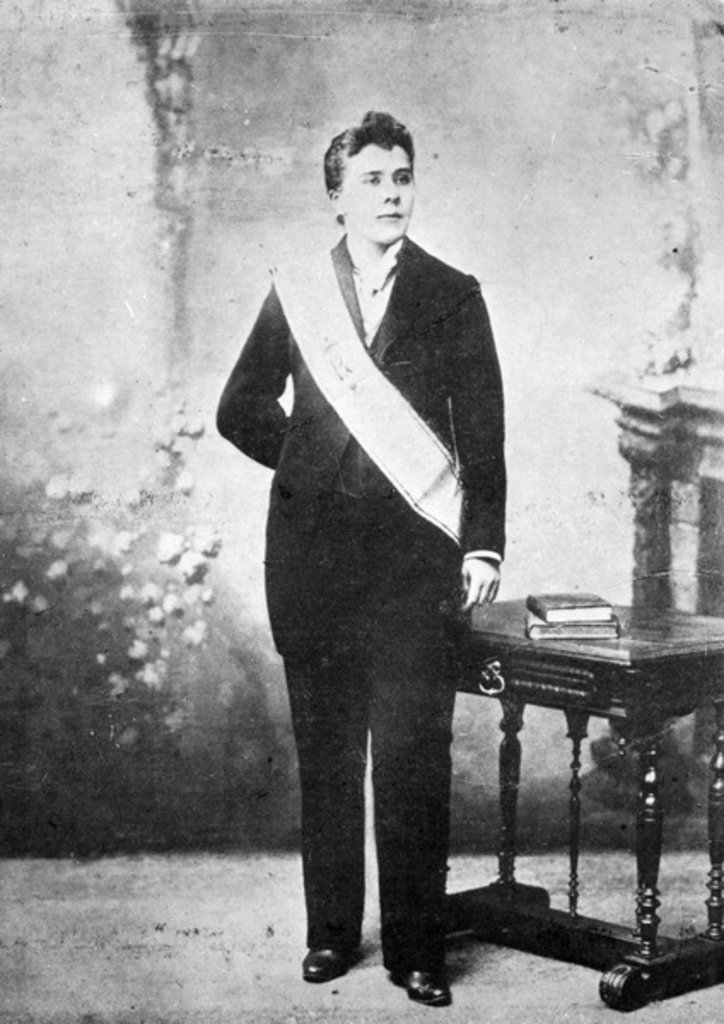
The fictional Diana Vaughan, dressed as General Inspector of Palladium. Photograph by Van Bosch, published in the book Mémoires d'une ex-palladiste parfaite, initiée, indépendante (1895)

After this encyclical, Taxil underwent a public, feigned conversion to Catholicism and declared his intention of repairing the damage he had done to the true faith.

The first book produced by Taxil after his conversion was a four-volume history of Freemasonry, which contained fictitious eyewitness verifications of their participation in Satanism. With a collaborator who published as "Dr. Karl Hacks", Taxil wrote another book called Le Diable au XIXe siècle (The Devil in the Nineteenth Century), which introduced a new character, Diana Vaughan, a supposed descendant of the Rosicrucian alchemist Thomas Vaughan. The book contained many tales about her encounters with incarnate demons, one of whom, a devil snake, was supposed to have written prophecies on her back with its tail, and another who played the piano while in the shape of a crocodile.

Diana was supposedly involved in Satanic Freemasonry but was redeemed when one day she professed admiration for Joan of Arc, at whose name the demons were put to flight. As Diana Vaughan, Taxil published a book called Eucharistic Novena, a collection of prayers which were praised by the Pope.

=== Palladists ===
In the Taxil hoax, Palladists were members of an alleged Theistic Satanist cult within Freemasonry. According to Taxil, Palladism was a religion practiced within the highest orders of Freemasonry. Adherents worshipped Lucifer and interacted with demons.

In 1891 Léo Taxil and Adolphe Ricoux claimed to have discovered a Palladian Society. An 1892 French book, Le Diable au XIXe siècle ("The Devil in the 19th Century", 1892), written by "Dr. Bataille" (actually Taxil himself), alleged that Palladists were Satanists based in Charleston, South Carolina, headed by the American Freemason Albert Pike and created by the Italian liberal-democratic patriot and author Giuseppe Mazzini.

Dr. Bataille asserted that women would supposedly be initiated as "Companions of Penelope". According to Dr. Bataille, the society had two orders, "Adelph" and "Companion of Ulysses"; however, the society was broken up by French law enforcement a few years after its founding. A supposed Diana Vaughan published Confessions of an Ex-Palladist in 1895.

== Early skepticism ==
The English magazine Light, devoted to occultism, published two letters and responses, skeptically analyzing the Taxil matter and claims attributed to Vaughn. The first letter was published in December 1895, and the second letter in January 1896.

Many Catholics were sympathetic to Taxil's claims, given the stories supported anti-Masonic sentiment in Catholicism. However, there were doubts among other Catholics, particularly about the existence of Diana Vaughn. Bishop Amand-Joseph Fava, among other leaders in the church, insisted Vaughn was a real person relating an accurate account of her experiences.

Prior to Taxil's confession of the fraud, English author Arthur Edward Waite was the most prominent skeptic of the story which he summarized and debunked in the 1896 book Devil Worship in France. Waite noted multiple problems and inconsistencies, including: claims that were contrary to known facts about Albert Pike and Thomas Vaughan; attribution to occultist Éliphas Lévi beliefs and practices which were not actually found in his works, as well as wholesale plagiarism of Lévi; no Masonic lodges were active in some of the times and places alleged by Taxil; and communications with residents of Calcutta which found no records of the persons alleged to have lived in that city. Furthermore, Waite noted documents supposedly written by the American Diana Vaughn showed frequent misspellings and errors indicating the author was probably French-speaking (e.g. Georges rather than George). Waite characterized the documents as "a perfervid narrative" with lurid illustrations similar to penny dreadful magazines of the era, which "deserves to rank among the most extraordinary literary swindles of the present, perhaps of any, century".

== Confession ==
On April 19, 1897, Léo Taxil called a press conference at the Société de Géographie at which he claimed he would introduce Diana Vaughan to the press. He declared that his claims about the Freemasons were hoaxes.

Taxil's confession was printed, in its entirety, in the Parisian newspaper Le Frondeur, on April 25, 1897, titled: Twelve Years Under the Banner of the Church, The Prank Of Palladism. Miss Diana Vaughan–The Devil At The Freemasons. A Conference held by M. Léo Taxil, at the Hall of the Geographic Society in Paris.

== Legacy ==
Despite this confession, belief in Vaughan and the Palladists did not entirely die out, and the hoax material has been cited for decades. The Chick Publications tract The Curse of Baphomet, also called That's Baphomet?, refers to the hoax material as if it were accurate. Randy Noblitt's book on Satanic ritual abuse, Cult and Ritual Abuse, also cites Taxil's fictitious claims.

Within works of fiction, a Palladist organization is central to the plot of the 1943 horror film The Seventh Victim. Palladist cults and Diana Vaughn were mentioned in the 1979 novel Our Lady of Darkness by Fritz Lieber, with the novel's characters debating if the there was any truth behind the hoax. The character of Taxil and the whole affair appear in Umberto Eco's 2010 novel The Prague Cemetery.

== Later interview with Taxil ==
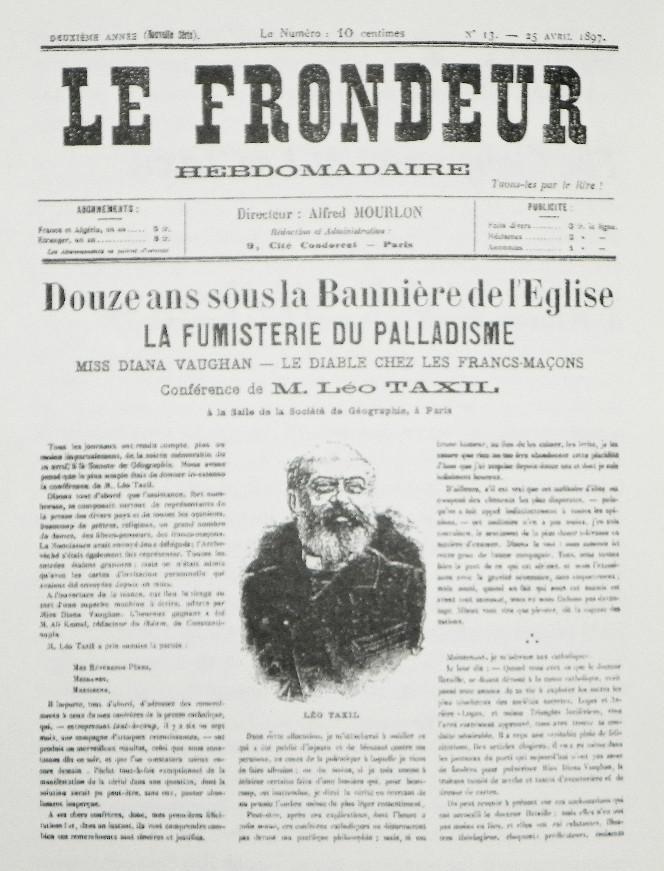
Parisian newspaper with the account of Leo Taxil's confession to the Taxil hoax

Ten months before his death on March 31, 1907, Taxil was quoted in the American National Magazine as giving his true reasons behind the hoax.

Members of the Masonic orders understand the false exposure heaped upon that organization in anti-Mason wars. The Catholic church and many other religious orders have been the victims of these half-written and oftentimes venomous attacks. The confession of Taxil, the French Free-thinker, who first exposed Catholics and then Masons, makes interesting reading bearing on the present situation today. Similar motives actuate some of the "muck rakes" of today, as indicated in the following confession:

"The public made me what I am; the arch-liar of the period," confessed Taxil, "for when I first commenced to write against the Masons my object was amusement pure and simple. The crimes I laid at their door were so grotesque, so impossible, so widely exaggerated, I thought everybody would see the joke and give me credit for originating a new line of humor. But my readers wouldn't have it so; they accepted my fables as gospel truth, and the more I lied for the purpose of showing that I lied, the more convinced became they that I was a paragon of veracity.

"Then it dawned upon me that there was lots of money in being a Munchausen of the right kind, and for twelve years I gave it to them hot and strong, but never too hot. When inditing such slush as the story of the devil snake who wrote prophecies on Diana's back with the end of his tail, I sometimes said to myself: 'Hold on, you are going too far,' but I didn't. My readers even took kindly to the yarn of the devil who, in order to marry a Mason, transformed himself into a crocodile, and, despite the masquerade, played the piano wonderfully well.

"One day when lecturing at Lille, I told my audience that I had just had an apparition of Nautilus, the most daring affront on human credulity I had so far risked. But my hearers never turned a hair. 'Hear ye, the doctor has seen Nautulius,' they said with admiring glances. Of course no one had a clear idea of who Nautilus was, I didn't myself, but they assumed that he was a devil.

"Ah, the jolly evenings I spent with my fellow authors hatching out new plots, new, unheard of perversions of truth and logic, each trying to outdo the other in organized mystification. I thought I would kill myself laughing at some of the things proposed, but everything went; there is no limit to human stupidity".

== The Luciferian quote ==
A series of paragraphs about Lucifer are frequently associated with the Taxil hoax. They read:

That which we must say to the world is that we worship a god, but it is the god that one adores without superstition. To you, Sovereign Grand Inspectors General, we say this, that you may repeat it to the brethren of the 32nd, 31st and 30th degrees: The masonic Religion should be, by all of us initiates of the higher degrees, maintained in the Purity of the Luciferian doctrine. If Lucifer were not God, would Adonay and his priests calumniate him?

Yes, Lucifer is God, and unfortunately Adonay is also god. For the eternal law is that there is no light without shade, no beauty without ugliness, no white without black, for the absolute can only exist as two gods; darkness being necessary for light to serve as its foil as the pedestal is necessary to the statue, and the brake to the locomotive....

Thus, the doctrine of Satanism is a heresy, and the true and pure philosophical religion is the belief in Lucifer, the equal of Adonay; but Lucifer, God of Light and God of Good, is struggling for humanity against Adonay, the God of Darkness and Evil.

While this quotation was published by Abel Clarin de la Rive in his Woman and Child in Universal Freemasonry, it does not appear in Taxil's writings proper, though it is sourced in a footnote to Diana Vaughan, Taxil's creation.

== See also ==
- List of hoaxes
- Affair of the Cards
- Poe's law
- The Prague Cemetery
