= Cult and Ritual Abuse =

Book by James Randall Noblitt and Pamela Sue Perskin

Cult and Ritual Abuse: Its History, Anthropology, and Recent Discovery in Contemporary America
- 1995 first edition cover
- Author: Randy Noblitt and Pamela Perskin
- Language: English
- Subject: Satanic ritual abuse
- Genre: Non-fiction
- Publisher: Praeger Publishing
- Publication place: United States
- English publication date: 1995/2000
- Media type: Hardcover
- Pages: 225 (1st ed.); 269 (2nd ed.)
- ISBN: 0-275-95281-9 (1st ed.); 027596664X (2nd ed.)

Cult and Ritual Abuse: Its History, Anthropology, and Recent Discovery in Contemporary America is a book written by James Randall Noblitt and Pamela Sue Perskin exploring the phenomenon of satanic ritual abuse (SRA). The authors argue that some allegations of intergenerational, ritualized abuse cults are supported by evidence, contrary to most scholars of the subject who regard satanic ritual abuse as a moral panic with no factual basis. Noblitt, a clinical psychologist, is Director of the Center for Counseling and Psychological Services in Dallas, Texas. Perskin is the executive director of the International Council on Cultism and Ritual Trauma and a lecturer on child abuse.

Cult and Ritual Abuse was first published in 1995; a revised edition followed in 2000. The book has been called the most reasonable review of the pro-conspiracy version of SRA to date, but was also criticized for being incoherent, inconsistent, uneven, filled with logical fallacies and for citing proven frauds as evidence.

== Reception ==
Both editions of the book have been reviewed several times.

=== First edition ===
Joel Best, a professor of criminal justice and sociology, described Cult and Ritual Abuse as having the "trappings" of a scholarly book, but as ultimately incoherent. He pointed out that even Noblitt and Perskin state their evidence is not compelling. Despite acknowledging the need for parsimony as in Occam's razor (i.e., favoring the simplest explanation that accounts for the evidence), Best notes the authors accept the less parsimonious proposition: that multigenerational, multinational abusive entities exist and have existed for centuries without discovery, rather than the more parsimonious idea that the patients are disturbed, malingering or mistaken. Best also drew attention to special pleading used by Noblitt and Perskin to support the stories of their patients. Best concluded that in order to understand the debate regarding SRA one must read the sceptical literature.

LeRoy Schultz, Professor Emeritus of social work at West Virginia University, described the book as a very selective review of the literature on SRA, citing only work that supports their point of view, and failing to address the issue of clinical versus empirical evidence.

A review in the American Journal of Psychotherapy stated that the book was probably the most reasonable review of the subject to date.

=== Second edition ===
Two reviews of the second edition refer to the book as an overview of the topic, and as a vehicle to advocate for the inclusion of cult and ritual trauma abuse in the Diagnostic and Statistical Manual of Mental Disorders, or DSM—the widely used guide for diagnosing mental disorders.

Edward L. King reviewed the book from a Freemason's perspective. He pointed out that Noblitt and Perskis cite cases that were known as frauds before the first edition of Cult and Ritual Abuse, such as Michael Warnke's claims to have been involved satanism (debunked in 1991) and the Taxil hoax from the 1890s, without qualification or noting that these examples were faked. King also pointed to the dubiousness of Noblitt's qualifications and certifications, concluding that what "[Noblit and Perskin] consider "research" is merely a self-serving screed designed to enhance their so-called 'professional' status as treating "satanic ritual abuse."

== See also ==
- Organised Sexual Abuse (2013)

== Editions ==
- Perskin, Pamela Sue; Noblitt, James Randall (1995). Cult and ritual abuse : its history, anthropology, and recent discovery in contemporary America. New York: Praeger Publishing. p. 225. ISBN 978-0-275-95281-5.
- Perskin PS, Noblitt JR (2000). Cult and ritual abuse: its history, anthropology, and recent discovery in contemporary America. New York: Praeger Publishing. p. 269. ISBN 978-0-275-96664-5.
