= Organised Sexual Abuse =

Book about ritual and group-based sexual abuse

- Author: Michael Salter
- Language: English
- Subject: Satanic and group-based child sexual abuse
- Publication date: 2012
- Publication place: Australia
- Pages: 216
- ISBN: 978-0415689779

Organised Sexual Abuse is a book written by Michael Salter about group-based, Satanic and ritual child sexual abuse. It was published by Routledge in 2012.

== Contents ==
The concept of organized sexual abuse was defined by Jean La Fontaine in the 1980s and saw limited development in academia afterwards. The topic of ritual abuse also remained contentious since the 1980s, and during the 2010s it started being associated with conspiracy theories, such as QAnon. Salter wrote in the book that previous research on the subfield of organized sexual abuse was confined to child prostitution, "sex rings", "multi-perpetrator sexual abuse in child care setting and ritual abuse". The book expands upon previous definitions of the concept and dedicates one chapter for each subcategory proposed by Salter, which comprise ritual, familial and sadistic abuse, as well as torture.

The book reports on qualitative research conducted by Salter. A number of accounts from his research participants have alleged instances of Satanic and ritual child sexual abuse and "mind control", including by perpetrators who often saw themselves as "kings" or "warlocks". The book also discusses allegations of child murder by what Salter describes as organized groups of child sexual abuse, as well as theories regarding masculinity and violence.

Salter divided the book into ten chapters. In chapter 4, Salter discusses what he describes as the "pleasures of disbelief" by general society and the justice system about accounts of organized sexual abuse. Sadistic abuse is discussed in chapter 8, ritual abuse is addressed in chapter 9 and anecdcotal accounts of murder related to organized sexual abuse is covered in chapter 10. Other topics discusses by the book include and networks of Satanic abuse, incest and child murder.

== Reception ==
The book has been criticized for not including enough information about its methodology. A review on Modern Law Review stated that Salter's personal experience with his teenhood friend, whose accounts of "organized sexual abuse" influenced him into choosing his field of research, could have biased his book. Salter wrote in the book that "[i]f I was a dispassionate 'outsider'", his research participants would know "from experience that it would be unlikely I would be able to grasp the full range of their experience".

Salter based his research exclusively upon testimonies from alleged sexual abuse victims and did not include any input from mental health practitioners, for which reason the book has been criticized. In the first pages of the book, he wrote that "some readers may find it a curious or even unscientific endeavour to craft a criminological model of organised abuse based on the testimony of survivors".

== See also ==
- Cult and Ritual Abuse
- Michelle Remembers
- List of satanic ritual abuse allegations

== Editions ==
- Salter, Michael (October 2012). Organised Sexual abuse. Routledge. ISBN 9780415689779.
- Salter, Michael (April 2014). Organised Sexual abuse. Routledge. ISBN 9781138789159.
