= Ernest Jouin =

French Catholic priest and essayist (1844–1932)

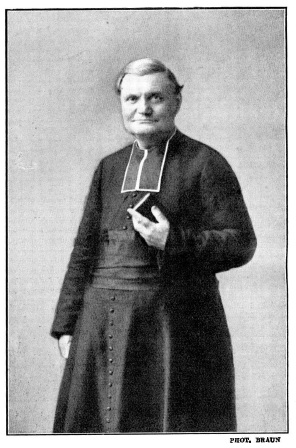
- Ernest Jouin (1844–1932)
- Born: 21 December 1844; Angers, France
- Died: 27 June 1932 (aged 87); Paris, France
- Occupations: Priest; Essayist; Journalist

Monsignor Ernest Jouin (21 December 1844 – 27 June 1932) was a French Catholic priest and essayist, known for his promotion of the Judeo-Masonic conspiracy theory. He also published the first French edition of The Protocols of the Elders of Zion.

== Life ==
Jouin was born in 1844 in Angers in a family of Catholic artisans. His father died when he was four, and he was sent to a novitiate of the Dominican Order to be educated. From there, he moved to the seminary of Angers and was ordained as a priest in 1868. From Angers, he moved to Paris in 1875, where he served as a parish priest until the end of his life. He strongly criticized the anti-clerical measures introduced by the government of Émile Combes, and was sentenced in 1907 to a fine for his writings regarded as subversive. He attributed the incident to Freemasonry and joined several anti-Masonic organizations before founding his own.

In 1912, Jouin founded the Ligue Franc-Catholique. The league's journal, the Revue internationale des sociétés secrètes, was one of the two main anti-Semitic tribunes of the interwar period (along with the paper of the Action Française). Revue often published right-wing antisemitic canards from Russian, such as hoaxes about blood libel, and claims that Bolshevism was a Judeo-Masonic plot. Describing the Protocols, Jouin wrote: "From the triple viewpoint of race, of nationality, and of religion, the Jew has become the enemy of humanity." Pope Benedict XV made Jouin an Honorary Prelate. Pope Pius XI praised Jouin for "combating our mortal enemy", Freemasonry, and appointed him to high papal office as a protonotary apostolic.
