= Léo Taxil =

French writer (1854–1907)

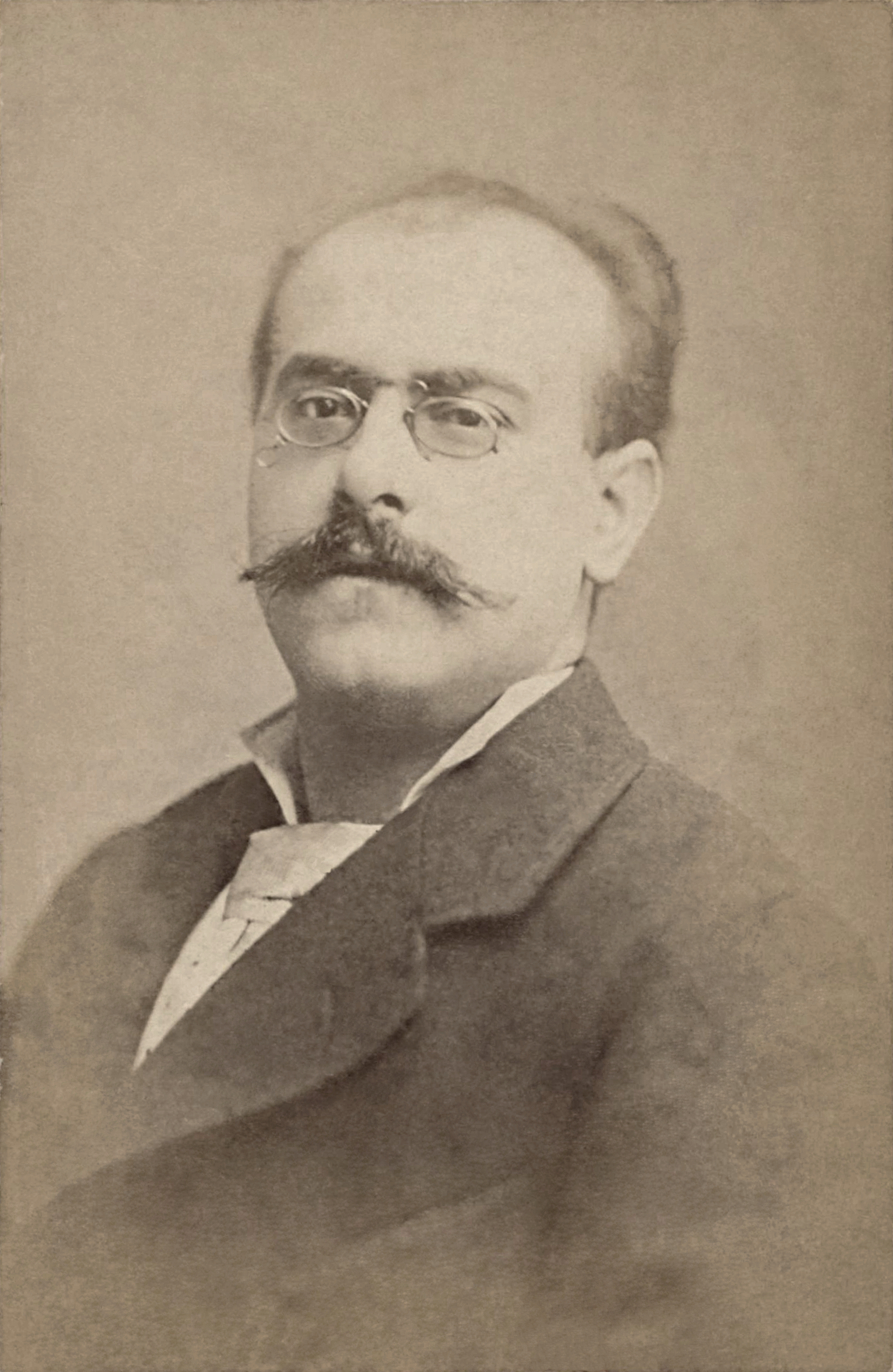
- Born: Marie Joseph Gabriel Antoine Jogand-Pagès; March 21, 1854; Marseille, France
- Died: March 31, 1907 (aged 53); Sceaux, France
- Occupations: Writer; journalist
- Writing career
- Pen name: Léo Taxil; Prosper Manin
- Subjects: Anti-Catholicism; anti-clericalism; Freemasonry hoaxes

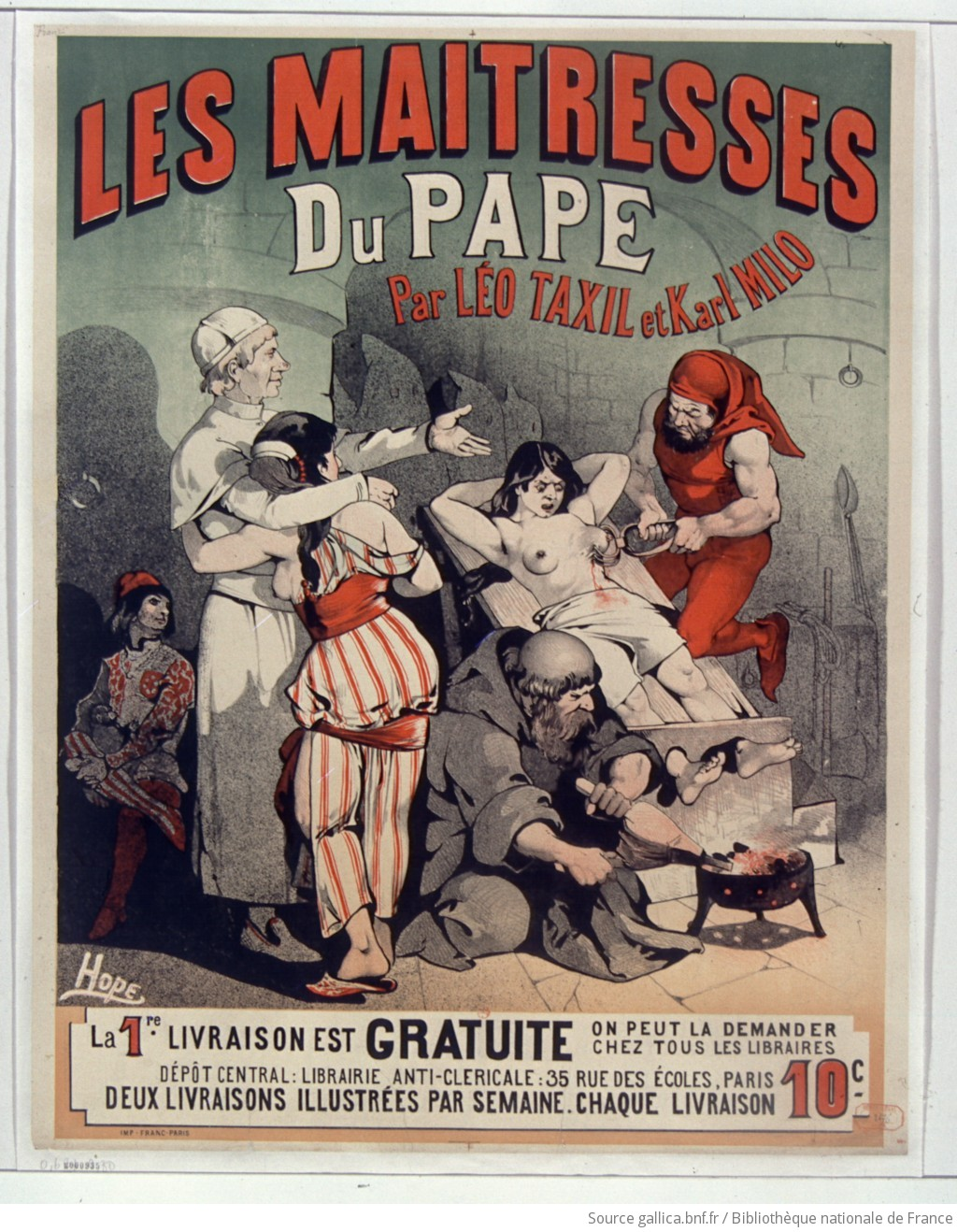
Poster advertising Les Maîtresses du Pape (The Pope's Mistresses) by Léon Choubrac (1884)

Marie Joseph Gabriel Antoine Jogand-Pagès, better known by the pen name Léo Taxil (French: [leo taksil]; March 21, 1854 – March 31, 1907), was a French writer and journalist who became known for his strong anti-Catholic and anti-clerical views. He is also known for the Taxil hoax, a spurious exposé of Freemasonry and the Catholic Church's opposition to it.

== Early life ==
Marie Joseph Gabriel Antoine Jogand-Pagès was born in Marseille, and at the age of five, he was placed into a Jesuit seminary. After spending his childhood years in the seminary, he came to reject the Catholic faith. He also wrote some novels under the pseudonym Prosper Manin.

== La Bible amusante ==
Taxil first became known for writing anti-Clerical or anti-Catholic books, notably La Bible amusante (The Amusing Bible) and La Vie de Jesus (The Life of Jesus). In his other books Les Débauches d'un confesseur (Debauchery of a Confessor, with Karl Milo), Les Pornographes sacrés: la confession et les confesseurs (Sacred Pornographs: confession and confessors), and Les Maîtresses du Pape (The Pope's Mistresses), Taxil portrays leaders of the Catholic Church as hedonistic creatures exploring their fetishes in the manner of the Marquis de Sade. In 1879, he was tried at the Seine Assizes for writing a pamphlet A Bas la Calotte ("Down with the Cloth"), which was accused of insulting a religion recognized by the state, but he was acquitted.

== Taxil hoax ==
In 1885, he professed conversion to Catholicism, was solemnly received into the church, and renounced his earlier works. In the 1890s, he wrote a series of pamphlets and books denouncing Freemasonry, charging their lodges with worshiping the devil and alleging that Diana Vaughan had written for him her confessions of the Satanic "Palladist" cult. The book had great sales among Catholics, although Diana Vaughan never appeared in public. In 1892, Taxil also began to publish a paper, La France chrétienne anti-maçonnique (Christian Antimasonic France), with his staunch anti-Masonic publishing friend, Abel Clarin de la Rive. In 1887, he had an audience with Pope Leo XIII, who rebuked the bishop of Charleston for denouncing the anti-Masonic confessions as a fraud and, in 1896, sent his blessing to an anti-Masonic Congress of Trent.

Doubts about Vaughan's veracity and even her existence began to grow, and finally, Taxil promised to produce her at a lecture to be delivered by him on 19 April 1897. To the amazement of the audience (which included a number of priests), he declared that both his revelations about the Freemasons as well as his conversion to Catholicism were hoaxes.

He died in Sceaux in 1907.

== Selected books ==
- Le Fils du Jésuite (The Jesuit's Son) (1879)
- La Vie de Jésus (The Life of Jesus) (1882)
- La Bible amusante (The Amusing Bible) (1882)
- Les Débauches d'un confesseur (The Debaucheries of a Confessor) (1884, with Karl Milo)
- Les Pornographes sacrés: la confession et les confesseurs (The Holy Pornographers: Confession and Confessors) (1882)
- Les Maîtresses du Pape (The Pope's Mistresses) (1884)
- Le Martyre de Jeanne d'Arc (The Martyrdom of Joan of Arc) (1890, with Paul Fesch; edition of Pierre Cauchon's manuscripts of Joan of Arc's trial)
- Prosper Manin. Marchands de chair humaine Dijon : E. Bernard, 1904. Petite collection E. Bernard ; n° 20. 128 p.: ll. ; in-16 Online text. 1904.

== See also ==
- Abel Clarin de la Rive
