= La Bible amusante =

1882 book by Léo Taxil

La Bible amusante pour les grands et les enfants
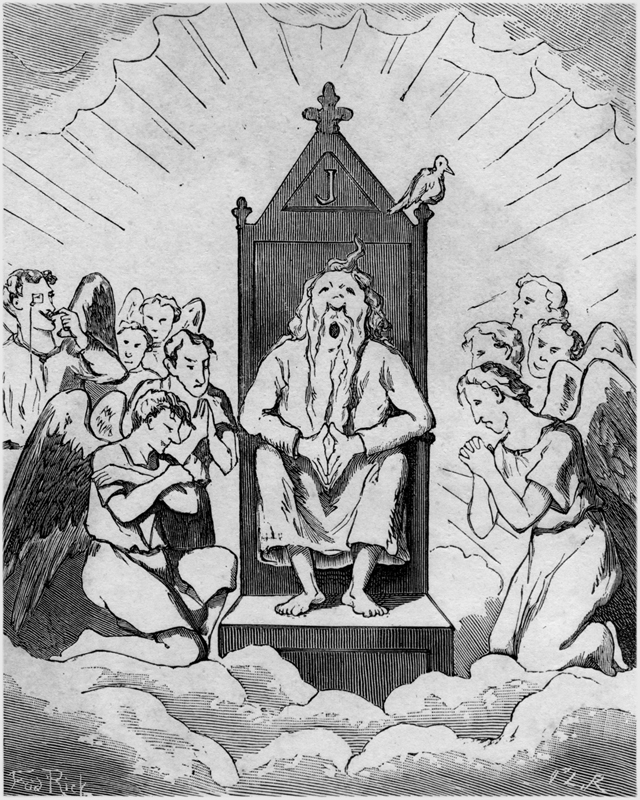
- An illustration from La Bible amusante
- Author: Léo Taxil
- Illustrator: Frid'rick
- Language: French
- Subject: Religion
- Genre: Humour
- Publisher: Libraire anticléricale
- Publication date: 1882
- Publication place: France
- Pages: 400
- OCLC: 15011914
- Preceded by: Calotte et calotins, histoire illustrée di clergé et des congrégations
- Followed by: L'empoisonneur Léon XIII et les cinq millions du chanoine

La Bible amusante pour les grands et les enfants (The Amusing Bible for Grown-ups and Children) was a book by Léo Taxil (the pen name of Marie Joseph Gabriel Antoine Jogand-Pagès) with illustrations by Frid'rick published in 1882 by Libraire anticléricale, in which he pointed out what he considered to be inconsistencies, errors and false beliefs. At the time of publication the author was accused of irreverently mocking the Bible. The Times called for the book to be suppressed.
