= Amand-Joseph Fava =

French bishop

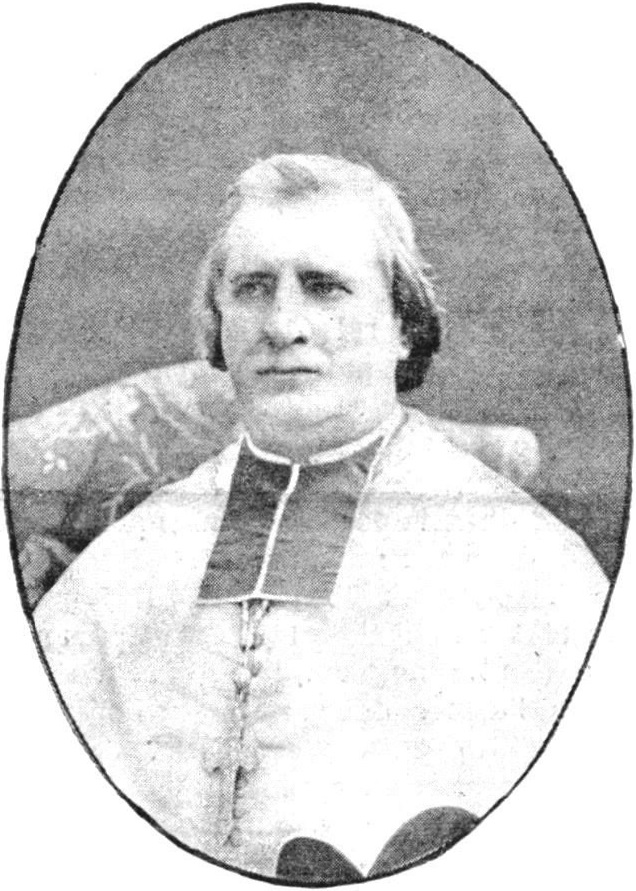
Amand-Joseph Fava (1826–1899)

Amand-Joseph Fava (1826–1899) was a French bishop.

Fava was ordained in 1851 and was Bishop of Martinique (Fort-de-France e Saint Pierre) in the Antilles from 1871 until 1875, when he became Bishop of Grenoble in France.
