= Yaakov Mazeh =

Russian rabbi (1859–1924)

Rabbi Yaakov Mazeh (Hebrew: יעקב מזא"ה; 1859–1924) served as the government-appointed chief rabbi of Moscow.

== Biography ==
The family name is an acronym stating that they are Kohanim: MiZera Aharon Hacohen (from the seed of Aaron the Priest).

Born 1859 in Mogilev, Belarus, Mazeh was raised by his maternal grandfather following the early passing of his father. His education was both religious and secular, including graduating from Moscow University's law school and, for a while, practicing law.

Mazeh was appointed by the Russian government to be the Chief Rabbi of Moscow in 1893, a position he held until his passing Dec. 19, 1924 in Moscow, Russia.

His son Saadiah (Sadi in the U.S.) was imprisoned 4 years after Rabbi Mazeh's passing for attending Zionist meetings but, due to outside pressure, was released with permission to leave Russia along with his wife Vera and their children.

== Beilis case testimony ==
Rabbi Mazeh was called by the defense in the Beilis Blood Libel as an expert witness, and was quite thorough in his 1913 testimony. Somewhat later, his court presentation was serialized in a Hebrew-language weekly newspaper.

== Other interests ==
His interest in Zionism was cut short by the 1917 revolution; he barely escaped arrest.

Rabbi Mazeh's interest in the Hebrew language included serving as a contributor to a publication named HaMeLits also was cut short; he redirected his language skills to Yiddish. An acceptable post-1917 use of his talents was in the co-founding, together with Nahum Zemach and Menachem Gensin, of the Habima Theater.

=== Written work ===
Aside from his journalistic works, in both Hebrew and Yiddish, (Note: and the above-mentioned Beilis trial testimony, which was subsequently serialized) he left (published posthumously in 1936) a four volume set, Zikhronos.

== Photos ==
- Rabbi Mazeh
- Another photo of Rabbi Yaakov Mazeh
