= Dmitry Pikhno =

Russian economist, politician and professor (1853–1913)

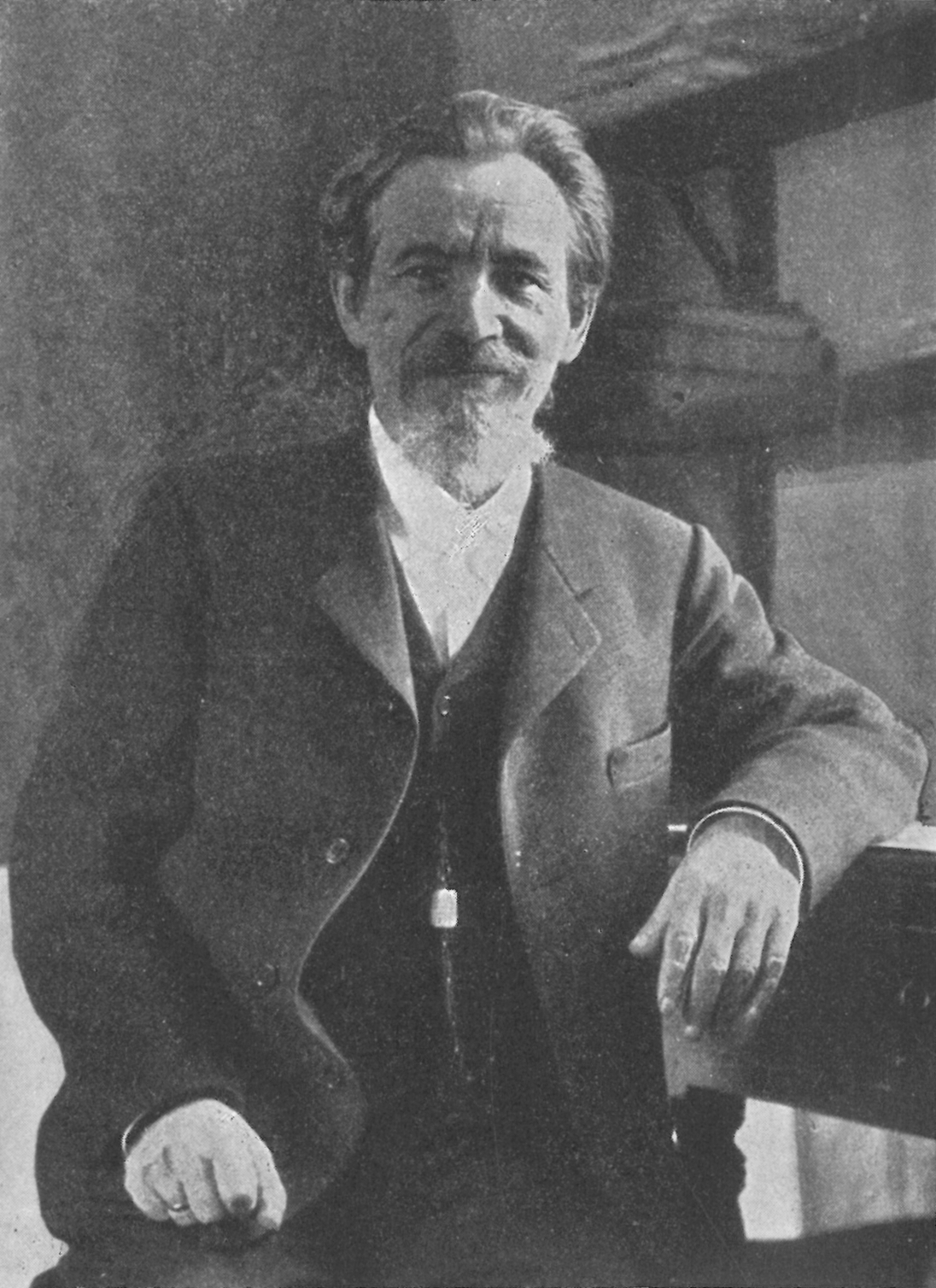
Dmitry Pikhno

Dmitry Ivanovich Pikhno (Russian: Дми́трий Ива́нович Пихно́; Ukrainian: Дмитро Іванович Піхно; January 13, 1853–1913) was a Russian economist, jurist-professor, journalist, landowner, and politician.

Pikhno was born at khutor (farmstead) Nesterovka, Chigirin uyezd, Kiev Governorate. His father worked as a miller. As a student of Nikolai von Bunge, in 1874 he graduated the Kiev University with a degree of candidate of juridical sciences and was a head of the student juridical club. In 1877 Pikhno was a docent, and since 1885 an extraordinary and in 1888-1901 an ordinary professor of the Kiev University department of political science and statistics. He advocated economic theories of the English classical school, becoming a promoter of market competition, capitalist rationalization of industry and agrarian economy, and author of a number of scientific works.

Pikhno became the editor of Kievlianin, the monarchist nationalist daily newspaper published in Kiev, after marrying the widow of its founder, Vitaly Shulgin. Russian White Movement leader Vasily Shulgin was Pikhno's stepson. Initially a follower of liberal monarchism, after the Revolution of 1905 Pikhno adopted reactionary and nationalist positions. Himself being of Ukrainian ancestry, he opposed the national self-determination of Ukrainians, and became one of the founders of the Kiev chapter of Union of the Russian People. In 1907 he was appointed member of the State Council, joining its right-wing group. In 1908 Pikhno founded the All-Russian National Union. He died in 1913 in Kiev.

== See also ==
- Beilis affair
