= Mikhail Menshikov =

Russian-British mathematician (1948–2026)

- Михаил Меньшиков
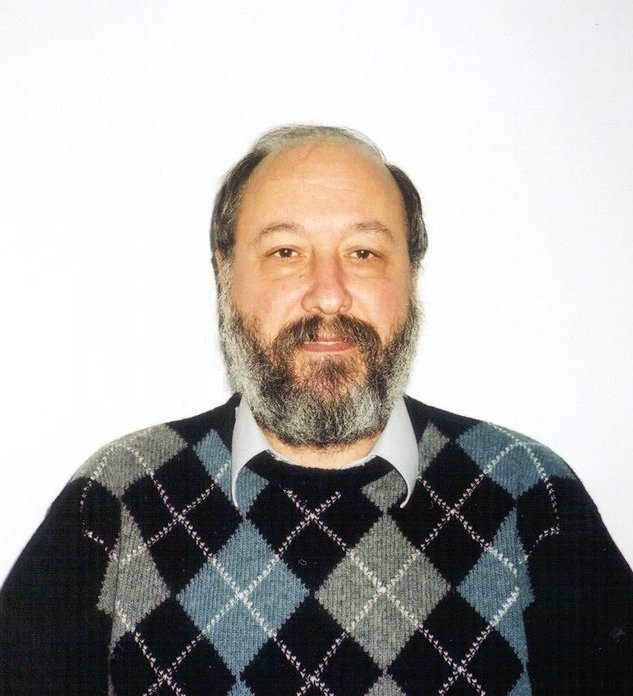
- Menshikov in 2009
- Born: 17 January 1948 (age 78); Moscow, Soviet Union
- Died: 1 May 2026 (aged 78); York, Great Britain
- Education: Moscow State University
- Known for: Percolation theory, random walks
- Scientific career
- Fields: Mathematician
- Workplaces: University of Durham
- Thesis: (1976)
- Doctoral advisor: Vadim Malyshev

Mikhail Vasilyevich Menshikov (Russian: Михаи́л Васи́льевич Ме́ньшиков; 17 January 1948 – 1 May 2026) was a Russian-British mathematician with publications in areas ranging from probability to combinatorics. He held the post of Professor in the University of Durham until his death in 2026.

Menshikov has made a substantial contribution to percolation theory and the theory of random walks.

Menshikov was born in Moscow and went to school in Kharkov, Ukrainian SSR, Soviet Union. He studied at Moscow State University earning all his degrees up to Candidate of Sciences (1976) and Doctor of Sciences (1988). After briefly working in Zhukovsky, Menshikov worked in Moscow State University for many years. His career then took him to the University of São Paulo before becoming a professor at the University of Durham.
