= Yama: The Pit =

Novel by Alexander Kuprin

The Pit
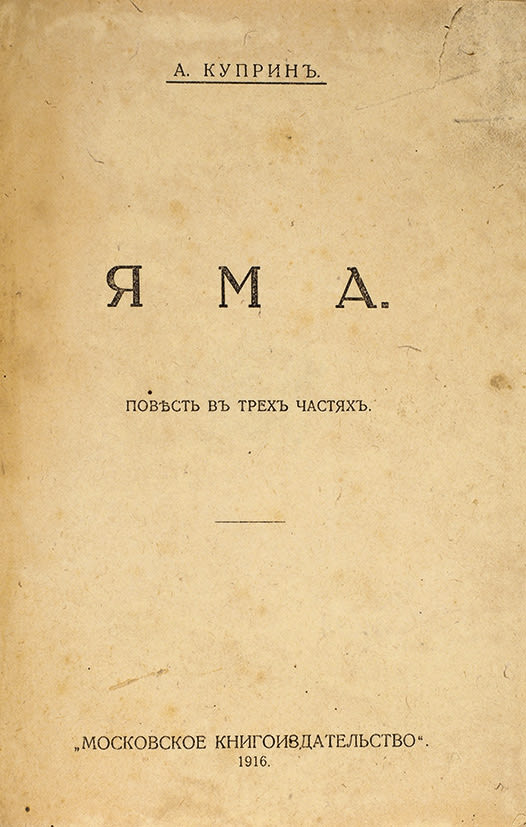
- 1916 edition
- Author: Alexander Kuprin
- Original title: Яма
- Language: Russian
- Publisher: Moscow Book Publishers; Zemlya almanac
- Publication date: 1909; 1914–1915
- Publication place: Russia

The Pit (Russian: Яма, romanized: Yama, published in English as Yama: The Pit) is a novel by Alexander Kuprin published in installments between 1909 and 1915, in Zemlya almanacs (Part 1 in 1909 and Parts 2–3 in 1914–1915). The book, centering on a brothel, owned by a woman named Anna Markovna, caused much controversy in its time.

== Background ==
Alexander Kuprin started collecting the material for his work in Kiev in 1890s, and it is in this city that the novel's action takes place. Speaking in 1909 to a local newspaper correspondent about prototypes, he commented: "Characters I've made cannot be seen as copying real people. I picked up a lot of small details from the real life, but that was by no means copying the reality, which is something I detest doing." He added that his observations were by no means restricted to Kiev. "The Pit is [about] Odessa, Petersburg and Kiev," Kuprin said.

The real life episode similar to that of singer Rovinskaya and her friends making a visit to a brothel happened in Saint Petersburg. According to the critic Alexander Izmaylov, the author was relating it to his friends as far back as 1905. Zhenya's character (according to biographer O.Mstislavskaya) was partly inspired by Kuprin's encounter with his neighbour landlord's niece in Danilovskoye, his Nizny Novgorod region estate. In 1908 he asked his friend Fyodor Batyushkov for Z.Vorontsova's book Memoirs of a Café-chantant Singer (1908) which provided him numerous details, some of which he used while creating the Tamara character. Platonov's monologues echo the discussions concerning prostitution that were going on in the Russian press in 1908-1909; similar views were expressed by the Saint Petersburg doctor P.E. Oboznenko.

== History ==
Kuprin was planning to start The Pit in the early 1900s and in 1902 he asked Mir Bozhy's editor Batyushkov if the magazine would publish a novel of that kind. As Batyushkov expressed doubts, the work was postponed. In 1907 Kuprin brought Part 1 of the novel to Mir Bozhy and the magazine announced its publication as planned for 1908, but then cancelled the publication. Kuprin signed a new deal with G.Blumenberg and D.Rebrik of the Moskovskoye Knogoizdatelstvo (Moscow Book Publishers) according to which the company would start publishing The Complete Kuprin series and include The Pit into their literary almanac Zemlya (The Land).

In November 1908, while in Gatchina, the author finished Chapters 1 and 2, in December - Chapters 3 and 4. "The going gets hard. The difficulty lies in the fact that the first, say, ten chapters' action is supposed to be squeezed into just one day," Kuprin complained, speaking to Alexander Izmaylov in January. Later, in order to get closer to the subject matter, Kuprin moved to Zhitomir, a city famous for its organised crime gangs engaged in the local sex industry.

His financial situation at the time was a dire one: the Moscow Book Publishers insisted that he'd break his contract with Saint Petersburg Progress which was planning to issue The Pit as a separate edition. Until then the MBP refused to pay him the advance and at some point Kuprin had to pawn some of his property to make ends meet. In March 1909, as the deadline approached, only 9 of 12 chapters of Part 1 were ready. Kurpin had to work hectically hoping that he'll be able to improve the text while proofreading, but eventually failed to do that. He was dissatisfied with the general quality of the text and with growing apprehension anticipated Lev Tolstoy's possible reaction. "Should he prove to be unsympathetic [to Part 1 of the novel], my writing process will be hindered. L.N.'s opinion is very important to me," Kuprin said in an interview."

The novel's first reviewer though happened to be V.I.Istomin, a member of the Moscow censorial committee. In his report he noted that there were fragments in the novel "which give us reasons to regard it as immoral and indecent... as well as fragments belying the author's intention to treat the problem of prostitution in the most serious manner." The list of indecencies featured all the episodes of officials and officers attending a brothel. On April 25, 1909, the committee's special meeting took place. Eventually the publication of The Vol.3 of Zemlya almanac was permitted. Still, when preparing The Pit for the inclusion into the Volumes VIII and IX of Adolf Marks-published The Collected Works by A.I. Kuprin (1912, 1915), Kuprin took into consideration the censorial report and removed all the bits in which the officials, officers and cadets' visiting the brothel were mentioned.

=== Parts 2 and 3 ===
After finishing Part 1, Kuprin started writing Part 2, which he intended to make "astonishingly frank" and "devoid of didacticism" (according to his letter to Ivan Bunin in June, 1909). While in Zhitomir he discussed possible plotlines and new ideas with visiting journalists and writers. For a while the work was going on fast. Then Kuprin read some reviews, was told of Tolstoy's opinion (who, having read the novel's first several chapters, said: "Very poor, brutal and unnecessarily dirty")), and in the autumn stopped writing. "Read too much of criticism, so much that I became sick of my own work," he wrote to Batyushkov.

Besides, another novel on prostitution came out, The Red Lantern (known in Russia under several other titles, "From Darkness Into the Light" and "The Dung-Beatle" among them), by the Austrian author Else Jerusalem. Some critics rated it higher than The Pit, much to Kuprin's dismay. "The Pit ripens, then bursts. These reviewers and E.Jerusalem have eaten me up," he wrote to V.S.Klestov, of the Moscow Book Publishers.

On February 26, 1910, Kuprin moved to Moscow, with the view to "find some quiet rooms" and start working on the Part 2 of The Pit. But in March he returned to Odessa and informed Klestov that he'd "done nothing in Moscow, being dragged down by petty scurry and bustle." The MBP, riled by Kuprin's failure to meet the deadline, stopped paying him advances. He dropped the novel, to concentrate upon short stories and articles. "Now I am very poor indeed. Pawned everything. What am I to live on? And how can I write The Pit? Willy-nilly I have to produce all manner of rubbish, publishing it in all kinds of places," Kuprin complained to Batyushkov. In summer 1910 Kuprin started writing The Garnet Bracelet which he finished in the autumn to send to Zemlya. After publishing the novelette in 1911, G.Blyumenberg found it unsuitable to go back to The Pit the publication of which had been interrupted two years ago. He advised Kuprin to make it a totally different novel. Kuprin came up with a title, "The Demise" (Гибель), but soon decided against "creating a host of new characters while others would hang in the air," as he noted in an autumn 1910 letter to Klestov).

In the course of 1911 Kuprin was working on The Pit in fits and starts, being too busy preparing texts for the forthcoming Complete A. Kuprin series by the Marks Publishing House. The first half of 1912 he spent abroad, and after the return started publishing sketches ("The Azure Shores") for Retch (Speech) newspaper. In 1912 the Saint Petersburg press came out with the sensational news that the author known as Count Amori (real name Hyppolite Rapgof) released his own book called "The Final Chapters of The Pit by I.A.Kuprin", featuring all the episodes the author was talking about while confiding with his literary friends in Zhitomir. The scandal apparently gave the author a much needed impetus. All through 1913 Kuprin was working upon The Pit and in December he came to Moscow to drive the work to completion. In spring 1914 the novel was finished. Blumenberg decided to break it in two and publish it in two issues of Zemlya. Kuprin detested the idea of having to go through the censorship committee twice. "First they'll cut an arm, then a leg," he complained. Indeed, the publication of Part 2's second part was stopped by censors; only in half a year the publishers received the censors' permission for the Vol.15 of Zemlya's release. Simultaneously the permission for the release of the Book 16 of Zemlya, featuring the novel's final chapters, was received.

In 1917, while working on the novel's text, preparing it for Volume XII of the Moscow Book Publishers' The Complete A.Kuprin edition, the author returned all the bits that he had to remove from Volumes XVIII and IX of the Marks' series, and made some stylistic changes to parts 2 and 3. This authorized version has been used in re-issues and compilations ever since.

== Critical reception ==
The Vol.3 of Zemlya almanac with the Part 1 of Yama came out in Spring 1909 and caused quite a stir. "In Moscow people talk of just one thing: The Pit," Ivan Bunin informed Kuprin in a letter, dated May 22, 1909. All the major Russian periodicals reviewed the novel.

Alexander Izmaylov argued that never since The Kreutzer Sonata had a Russian novel "touched so daringly upon morbid wounds of life." "Against the demon of lie, lust and evil greed does the Russian writer Kuprin wage his war," the critic concluded. Volynh praised The Pit as a damning social document. "Horror, shuddering horror rules this kingdom of champing toads," the reviewer Botsyanovsky wrote. Droog (Friend) magazine hailed the novel as "a powerful warning for parents and youngsters." The literary historian Pyotr Kogan maintained that "before Kuprin nobody had even made an attempt to trace - hour by hour, day by day, - the everyday life of such places."

There was a wave of negative response too. Volynh (No.295, October 27, 1909), as well as Vestnik Literatury later (No.8, August, 1911) argued that such naturalistic descriptions of the life in a brothel could serve only for the spreading of prostitution, not its eradication. Vatslav Vorovsky accused Kuprin of idealizing prostitutes; the Marxist critic found the whole style of the novel uncharacteristically sentimental. The Pit was severely criticized by both pro-monarchist Novoye Vremya and the Symbolist Vesy magazine. The latter's reviewer Boris Sadovskoy saw the novel as 'a pit' of Kuprin's weaknesses: his "tendency to daub real life sketches, being prone to textbook didacticism and having a taste for the ugliest things in life." "Into The Pit Kuprin has stuck all that he's got and what did he get? - another Duel," the critic argued.

Parts 2 and 3 of The Pit, published in 1915, made no resonance. Reviewers deplored what they saw as the lack of compositional integrity, the disparity of motifs and the author's eagerness to rely on literary clichés. "Something feuilleton-like, petty and derivative is there in the garishness of many scenes, and the general drift of the story is banal," wrote Russkiye Zapisky (Russian Notes, 1915, No.1) reviewer.

One of the few critics who assessed the novel's second and third parts highly was Korney Chukovsky. "That is a different kind of Yama, it has little in common with the one we read several years ago. In the former all the action took place in just one tiny hole. This time the author takes us through thousand places - from a café-chantant to a graveyard, a morgue, a police station, a student dormitory. And this motley canvas knit of myriad of faces is based on one grandiose theme, one powerful feeling. Each character stands out in relief, you can almost touch it and that is why all this affects you so... Karbesh, Sonjka the Rule, Anna Markovna, Emma and Semyon Horizont - all of them are portrayed in such a way that I would recognize each and every one of them in a huge crowd," the critic wrote.

=== Kuprin's response ===
Kuprin, who had to deal with a lot of criticism, conceded the novel had its weaknesses and faults, but maintained he never regretted the huge amount of time he spent on it. "I certainly believe I've done an important job. Prostitution is a worse evil than war of famine: wars come and go, but prostitution stays with us through centuries," he told Birzhevyie Vedomosti in 1915. Speaking of Lev Tolstoy's original negative response, he added, "This might be dirt, but one has to wash it off. Should Lev Tolstoy have written of prostitution, using all the power of his genius, he'd have done a highly important job, for people would have listened to him more than they do to me. Alas, my pen is weak..."

In 1918, responding to the question of the novel's ideological relevance poised by the veteran worker P.I. Ivanov, Kuprin said: "I'll tell you confidentially, I am not good at teaching people how to live their lives. I've mangled my own life as bad as I could. My readers see me mostly as a good friend and an engaging storyteller, that is all."
