= Vekov =

Vekov is a surname. Notable people with the surname include:

- Károly Vekov (1947–2020), Hungarian-Romanian historian
- Nikolai Vekov, Russian opera and operetta artist
