= Moloch (Kuprin novel) =

1896 short novel by Alexander Kuprin

- Author: Alexander Kuprin
- Original title: Молох
- Translator: Stepan Apresyan
- Language: Russian
- Publisher: Russkoye Bogatstvo (1896)
- Publication date: 1896
- Publication place: Russian Empire
- Media type: Print (hardback & paperback)

Moloch (Молох) is a short novel by Alexander Kuprin, first published in Russkoye Bogatstvo's December 1896 issue. A sharp critique of the rapidly growing Russian capitalism and a reflection of the growing industrial unrest in the country, it is considered Kuprin's first major work.

== Synopsis ==
Engineer Andrey Bobrov works for a ruthless employer, feeling more and more uncomfortable with what is going on around him. After losing Nina, the woman he loves, to the amoral industrialist Kvashnin who owns the company, he suffers a nervous breakdown and is left a broken man, prone to frenzied and futile debates with his own 'double'. The story's finale hints at the outbreak of a workers' revolt.

== Characters ==
- Andrey Bobrov, a sensitive and socially conscious man who recognizes the factory he works for as an insatiable Moloch, the brazen god of the Ammonites for whom children were made "to pass through the fire" in ritual sacrifice (2 Kings 23:10).
- Kvashnin, the owner of the enterprise, "gluttonous, debauched, monstrously fat" whom Bobrov sees as the very embodiment of "industrial amorality".
- Svezhevsky, a loathsome careerist, "a modern day Uriah Heep" (Nicholas Luker).
- Zinenko, a man in charge of stores at the factory; he fawns on his superiors, gossips about his colleagues, and tyrannizes his subordinates.
- Nina, Zinenko's daughter, a beautiful young woman whom Bobrov falls in love with and who's more impressed with Kvashnin's wealth. To be married to Svezhevsky so as to become Kvashnin's mistress under the cloak of respectability.
- Goldberg, physician at the factory and Bobrov's only friend.
- Andrea, a well-educated and highly intelligent Belgian engineer.

== Background ==
According to scholar Nicholas Luker, "thematically Moloch belongs firmly in the 1890s, and reflects many of the social and economic issues of that decade":

The second half of the 1800s saw the rapid development of Russian capitalism, with its concomitant industrial expansion. As her rail network was enlarged and her textile, metallurgical, and mining industries expanded, Russia's output rose steadily. The All-Russian Industrial Exhibition of 1896 in Nizhny Novgorod, to which Kuprin refers in "The Yuzovsky Works," was designed to demonstrate the impressive achievements of Russian industry. But with the industrial boom came growing unrest among the new working class, its ranks swelled by poor peasants driven off the land by such agrarian crises as the famine of 1891-1892.

A series of industrial disturbances of the mid-1890s are reflected in the workers' revolt at the end of Moloch.

== History ==
The story was first published in Russkoye Bogatstvo, No. 12, December issue. In a heavily edited version, it appeared in The Stories, a 1903 collection published by Gorky's Znaniye. The same year it was published by Donskaya Rech (The Don Speech), a Rostov-on-Don-based publishing house. There the final scene was absent altogether. The process of the text's moderation continued while the author was preparing it for Adolf Marks' The Complete Kuprin series. Judging by the author's letter to Nikolai Mikhaylovsky, originally the last chapter looked much more radical than its final version. Eventually its tone was considerably toned down according to Mikhaylovsky's recommendations.

Submitting the text to the publishers (A. K. Marks), Kuprin wrote to Mikhaylovsky: "Here's Moloch’s 11th chapter. I've changed it drastically following your instructions. Now I'd like to ask you, please, - should you find something improper with the text, please go through it with your own pen... There is one thing I should confess to: I've still not managed to avoid morbid psychology. Perhaps this unhappy genre is inseparable from me?" Kuprin, apparently, planned to finish Moloch with the scene of the workers' revolt, with Bobrov blowing up the boilers. Mikhaylovsky insisted on changing the finale, finding it 'melodramatic'. This (according to Soviet critic I. Pitlyar) has made the general tone of the novel more pessimistic. As Kuprin wrote to Mikhailovsky upon altering his manuscript: "About the revolt - not a word. One will only be able to feel it."

== Critical reception ==
Angel Bogdanovich, reviewing Kuprin's collection for Znaniye, wrote: Of the ten pieces included, only Moloch, the longest one, stands out... But despite some excellent fragments, like the one depicting the factory in general, there is some stiltedness in the style, as if the author works under some outside influence.

According to modern scholar Nicholas Luker, "The defects of Moloch are several. The melodrama of works like "In the Dark" emerges again, especially in the Bobrov-Nina-Kvashnin triangle, which bears some resemblance to the earlier Alarin-Zinaida-Kashperov pattern. Two sections of Moloch are unashamedly sensational: the fevered verbal exchanges between Bobrov and Mme Zinenko at the picnic, and the arrival of the hero, blood-stained and tattered, at the hospital to beg Goldberg for morphia."
