= La Sorcière (film) =

- Directed by: André Michel
- Written by: Paul Andréota; Jacques Companéez; Christiane Imbert; Aleksandr Kuprin
- Produced by: Robert Woog
- Starring: Marina Vlady
- Cinematography: Marcel Grignon
- Edited by: Victoria Mercanton
- Music by: Norbert Glanzberg; André Lafosse
- Production companies: Films Metzger et Woog; Iéna Productions; Nordisk Tonefilm
- Release date: 11 April 1956
- Running time: 97 minutes
- Countries: France; Sweden
- Languages: French; Swedish

La Sorcière (French: The Sorceress, Swedish title: Häxan) is a 1956 drama horror film directed by André Michel based on a screenplay by Paul Andréota and Jacques Companéez. Adapted from the 1898 Alexander Kuprin novel Olesya.

== Plot summary ==
A French civil engineer Laurent Brulard is involved in road construction in a remote corner of Sweden. There he meets a local girl named Ina whom locals consider to be a witch. A considerable element of the drama is the love triangle that involves Laurent's landlady Kristina.

== Cast ==
- Marina Vlady as Ina
- Nicole Courcel as Kristina Lundgren
- Maurice Ronet as Laurent Brulard
- Michel Etcheverry as Camoin
- Rune Lindström as Reverend Hermansson
- Erik Hell as Pullinen
- Eric Hellström as Erik Lundgren
- Ulla Lagnell as Mrs. Hermansson
- Naima Wifstrand as Maila
- Ulf Palme as Matti

== Awards ==
At the 6th Berlin International Film Festival it won the Silver Bear award for Outstanding Artistic Contribution.

== See also ==
- Olesya (1971 film)
