= The Inquiry (short story) =

- Short story by Alexander Kuprin
- Original title: Дознание
- Country: Russia
- Language: Russian

Publication
- Published in: 1894
- Publisher: Russkoye Bogatstvo; Khudozhestvennaya Literatura

"The Inquiry" (Russian: Дознание, romanised as Doznaniye) is a short story by Alexander Kuprin first published in Russkoye Bogatstvo's August 1894, issue, under the title "From the Distant Past" (Iz otdalyonnovo proshlovo, Из отдалённого прошлого). The story's original title, "Corporal Punishment" (Экзекуция) has been dropped by the magazine's editor Nikolai Mikhaylovsky so as to avoid possible problems with censorship. Its final title was chosen in the early 1900s.

The imminent publication of "The Inquiry" was probably a major reason for Kuprin's resignation from the army service in the summer of 1894. "There can be no doubt that the appearance of such a work, written by an officer and signed with his full name, would have had unpleasant consequences for him," the Kuprin scholar Nicholas Luker argued. According to the latter, "The Inquiry is central to Kuprin's development because in Kozlovsky it presents the first in a succession of sensitive young officers at odds with their fellows and painfully aware of the injustice prevalent in the army. That type is continued in figures like Yakhontov of "Pokhod" (The March, 1901), and exemplified by Romashov of The Duel."

== Plot ==
Kozlovsky, a young lieutenant in a provincial garrison, is ordered to conduct an inquiry into the theft of a pair of boot tops and thirty-seven kopecks, of which the Tatar Baiguzin is the only suspect. Appealing to the soldier's filial feelings, he extracts a confession from him and as a result the latter is sentenced to a hundred strokes of the birch. Kozlovsky realizes the absurdity of the act: the Tatar boy can barely understand Russian, his confession sounded as if he mechanically repeated the accusations.

Kozlovsky is horrified by the flogging and appalled at his fellow officers' indifference to what he considers a travesty of justice. Having unwillingly established an irrational spiritual bond with this pathetic childlike creature, he suddenly sees the horrors of the army though Baiguzin's eyes and is now tormented by feelings of guilt. He feels like both a victim to the same indifferent system that sentenced Baiguzin to the rod, and, in a way, an executioner, who had tricked the hapless soldier into somewhat unconvincing 'confession' of totally ridiculous 'crime'.
