= Olesya (novel) =

Novelette by Alexander Kuprin

- Author: Alexander Kuprin
- Original title: Олеся
- Language: Russian
- Publisher: Kievlyanin (1898)
- Publication date: 1898
- Publication place: Russian Empire
- Media type: Print (hardback & paperback)

Olesya (Russian: Олеся) is a novelette by Alexander Kuprin written in late 1897 – early 1898 and serialized in Kievlyanin newspaper from October 30 to November 17, 1898. Olesya, the most acclaimed piece of his Polesye cycle, did much to build Kuprin's literary reputation and warranted his move to Saint Petersburg.

According to the Kuprin scholar Nicholas Luker, "Olesya is the most charming of Kuprin's rural tales. Though meant at first to be only part of the Volhynia and Polesye cycle, this poetic story of the love between an urban intellectual and a beautiful country girl expanded into a full novelette of a significance far surpassing that of the other regional tales." The story was one of Kuprin's favorites. Referring once to both Olesya and his later work "The River of Life," he said: "There is life in it and freshness and... more of my soul than in my other tales."

== Background ==
In 1897 Kuprin went first to Volhynia Province in the northwest Ukraine, where he worked as an estate manager, and then to the Polesye area in southern Belarus. In the winter of 1897-1898 he moved to Ryazan Province, where Olesya was written. Kuprin considered several months spent in Volhynia and Polesye to be most beneficial of his life. "There I absorbed my most vigorous, noble, extensive, and fruitful impressions... and came to know the Russian language and landscape," he remembered.

The story is autobiographical. "All this has happened to me," Kuprin wrote mysteriously toward the end of his life.

== History ==
Olesya was first published in Kiyevlyanin newspaper (Nos. 300, 301, 304, 305–308, 313–315, 318) in late 1898 (October 30 - November 17). This original version of the work, subtitled "From the Memories of Volhynia," came out with an introduction alleging that this was the story told to the author by an Ivan Timofeevich Poroshin, now an old man, as he recalled his youthful love for the "real Polesye sorceress" Olesya.

In 1905 the novel came out as a separate edition, published by M.O. Wolf's Publishing house in Saint Peterburg, as part of the Library of Russian and Foreign Authors series (Issues 18 and 19). For it Kuprin removed the introduction, but otherwise this second version bore no difference from the original one.

In 1908, Olesya was included into the first edition of The Works by A.I.Kuprin which came out in the Moscow Book Publishers. Here Kuprin removed footnotes explaining details of the local dialect and changed several foreign words for their Russian analogues. Of the several minor additions one is of note: to Yarmola's words describing Manuylikha (Olesya's grandmother) "... But she was an outsider, anyway, from Katsaps" - "...or perhaps Gypsies," was added.

=== Controversy ===
Published in Russkoye Bogatstvo (No 9, September 1898), "The Backwoods" was intended as the first work in the cycle, to be followed by Olesya. But the latter was not accepted by the journal, and Kuprin was obliged to place it elsewhere, finally serializing it in Kievlyanin 1898. ("The Werewolf" was published in Odesskie Novosti in 1901, this delay leaving the whole cycle incomplete.)

The reason that Olesya was rejected by Russkoye Bogatstvo has never been explained. "It could be surmised that the magazine leaders disagreed with the way the peasants' mob (which tried to lynch Olesya) was portrayed there. Depicting the rural people as an ignorant, aggressive and cruel mob totally contradicted the Narodnik ideas which Russkoye Bogatstvo was at the time propagating," biographer I.Pitlyar suggested.

== Summary ==
Ivan Timofeevich seeks restorative peace in Polesye, but gets only intolerable boredom, from which the prospect of meeting a real witch offers a welcome diversion. Once, having lost his way in the woods, he comes across a hut where an old woman and her granddaughter live. They are hated and feared in the village for their alleged sorcery. The narrator is deeply intrigued and touched by the girl's natural beauty, intelligence, insight and uncanny talents. He becomes a frequent visitor, much to the displeasure of her grandmother. Ivan and Olesya become close friends, then lovers, sharing deep mutual affection. However, this was doomed from the start as Olesya's cards had foretold.

Both women live in constant fear of repression from the local authorities and aggression from the locals. Their little house had been granted to them by a former landlord and they will be removed by the new one. Ivan manages to bribe a local policemen into leaving them alone for a while which inadvertently causes him great trouble.

Ivan proposes to Olesya, who declines. Before their parting, Olesya suggests that she will go to the church after avoiding it all her life to please Ivan. Ivan concedes that this would give him some satisfaction. After the service Olesya gets mobbed and beaten by the locals. She tears away from the crowd and yells threats. The next day hail destroys the harvest. Horrified with the news brought by his servant, Ivan hurries to the forest hut only to see it abandoned, with cheap red beads hanging on a window as a token for him.

== Characters ==
- Ivan Timofeyevich, "a shadowy but attractive figure whose ready irony at his own expense endears him to us," "a noble- hearted but weak-willed urban animal whose hesitant nature contrasts sharply with the bold decisiveness of Olesya's rural temperament." (Luker) Olesya the fortuneteller characterizes him neatly: "...though you're a good man, you're weak ... not a man of your word."
- Yarmola, Ivan's drunkard servant and hunting companion.
- Manuylikha, Olesya's grandmother who'd been driven from the village as a witch. "Almost a Baba Yaga figure - the traditional witch of Russian fairy tales" - she proves to be an intelligent, although rather unpleasant woman.
- Olesya. A girl brought up in the remote forests, untouched by civilization. An "idealized, romantic creation, the archetypal daughter of nature, as beautiful and free as the virgin forests to which she belongs" (Luker). Delightfully attractive as she is, Olesya is a mysterious creature acutely sensitive to the ever-changing moods of the forest around her. Her oneness with the wild beauty of nature lends her supernatural powers that Timofeyevich finds disturbing and sinister. She possesses the gifts of prophecy and hypnosis, and can unerringly foretell death. "Framed by the quietly evocative beauty of Polesye, his miraculous heroine stands out in brilliant relief against the somber hostility around her." (Luker)

== Film adaptations ==
- 1956: La Sorcière
- 1971: Olesya
