= In the Dark =

In the Dark or in the dark may refer to:

== Albums ==
- In the Dark (Toots and the Maytals album) (1973)
- In the Dark (Grateful Dead album) (1987)
- In the Dark (The Whigs album) (2010)
- In the Dark – Live at Vicar Street, an album by Josh Ritter (2006)
- In the Dark, an album by Dutch indie band Face Tomorrow (2008)

== Songs ==
- "In the Dark" (Bix Beiderbecke song), (1931)
- "In the Dark" (Billy Squier song) from Don't Say No (1981)
- "In the Dark" (Bring Me the Horizon song), from Amo (2019)
- "In the Dark" (Camila Cabello song), (2018)
- "In the Dark" (Dev song), from The Night The Sun Came Up (2011)
- "In the Dark" (DJ Snake and Stray Kids song), from Normad (2025)
- "In the Dark" (Purple Disco Machine and Sophie and the Giants song), (2022)
- "In the Dark" (Tiësto song), from Elements of Life (2007)
- "In the Dark", a song by 3 Doors Down from Us and the Night (2016)
- "In the Dark", a song by Armin van Buuren, David Guetta & Aldea (2024)
- "In the Dark", a song by Atreyu from The End Is Not the End (2026)
- "In the Dark", a song by Ava Max from Diamonds & Dancefloors (2023)
- "In the Dark", a song by The Birthday Massacre from Pins and Needles (2010)
- "In the Dark", the working title of "You're the One" by Charli XCX (2012)
- "In the Dark", a song by Corinne Bailey Rae from The Heart Speaks in Whispers (2016)
- "In the Dark", a song by Flyleaf from Memento Mori (2009)
- "In the Dark", a song by In Flames from Foregone (2023)
- "In the Dark", a song by JoJo from Can't Take That Away from Me (2010)
- "In the Dark", a song by Kate Miller-Heidke from Nightflight (2012)
- "In the Dark", a song by Swae Lee from Shang-Chi and the Legend of the Ten Rings: The Album (2021)
- "In the Dark", a song from "Nina Simone Sings the Blues," 1967, RCA (1967), an adaptation of "Two Cigarettes in the Dark," et al.

== Television ==
- In the Dark (British TV series), a 2017 BBC crime drama miniseries, based on a novel by Mark Billingham
- In the Dark (American TV series), a 2019 drama series on The CW
- "In the Dark" (Angel), a 1999 episode
- "In the Dark" (Law & Order: Criminal Intent), a 2004 episode
- "In the Dark" (NCIS), a 2007 episode
- "In the Dark" (Tru Calling), a 2005 episode
- In the Dark, a 2013 TV movie directed by Richard Gabai and starring Elisabeth Röhm

== Other ==
- In the Dark (podcast), a true crime and investigative journalism podcast produced by The New Yorker
- In the Dark (novel), a novel by Alexander Kuprin
- In the Dark, a novel by Mark Billingham
- In the Dark, a novel by Mai Jia
- In the Dark, a horror novel by Richard Laymon
- "in the dark", a poker term — see Glossary of poker terms
- In the Dark, a 2012 horror film starring Shannon Elizabeth

== See also ==
- Andhare Alo (disambiguation), Indian films so titled
