= The Duel (1910 film) =

- Russian: Поединок
- Directed by: Maurice Maître
- Written by: Vladimir Konenko
- Starring: A. Lesnogorsky; Z. Mamonova; Nikolay Vailiev
- Cinematography: Joseph-Louis Mundwiller
- Production company: Pathé Frères
- Release date: 1910
- Running time: 35 min.
- Country: Russian Empire

The Duel (Russian: Поединок, romanized: Poedinok) is a 1910 Russian short film directed by Maurice Maître.

== Plot ==
The film is based on the 1905 novel The Duel by Aleksandr Kuprin.

Lieutenant Romashov falls in love with his captain's young wife Alexandra Nikolaeva.

== History ==
The premiere took place on September 28, 1910. The film has been preserved to our time without inscriptions.

== Cast ==
- A. Lesnogorsky as Romashov
- Z. Mamonova as Shurochka
- Nikolay Vailiev as Nikolaev
- Lidiya Sycheva
- Nikolai Vekov

== Film crew ==
Directed by: André Maitre

Screenplay: Vladimir Konenko

Cinematography: Georges Meyer, Toppi

Production designer: Czeslaw Sabinski

== Literature ==
- Great Cinema. Catalog of Surviving Feature Films of Russia. 1908 — 1919; New Literary Review Publishing, 2002. Page 66. ISBN 5-86793-155-2

== See also ==
- Duel (1957 film)
