= The Last Debut =

- Short story by Alexander Kuprin
- Country: Russia
- Language: Russian
- Genre(s): Psychological drama Short story

Publication
- Publisher: Russian Satirical Leaflet; Khudozhestvennaya Literatura
- Publication date: 1889

Chronology
| — | "Psyche" (1892) |

The Last Debut (Russian: Последний дебют, romanized: Posledny debyut) is the debut story by the Russian writer Alexander Kuprin originally published in 3 December 1889 (No. 48) issue of the Russky Satirichesky Listok (Russian Satirical Leaflet) magazine.

== Synopsis ==
In the actress Golskaya's dressing room between acts three and four of the show, her impresario (and fellow actor) Alexander Petrovich, whom she loves, announces the end of their affair and promises to provide for the child she is expecting. Apart from that, he rebukes her for her allegedly poor performance in the play where, coincidentally, her role is that of a deceived girl, while he plays her seducer. In the final act Golskaya performs with superb power to impress everybody except her unresponsive stage partner. She reaches the ultimately realistic effect by taking real poison in full view of the audience as the curtain falls.

== Background ==
The story was based on a real life incident, the suicide by poisoning on stage in Kharkov of an aspiring Russian actress, Yevlalya Kadmina, who played that evening the leading role in Vasilisa Melentyeva, a historical drama by Alexander Ostrovsky. This tragedy caused a lively debate in the Russian press. It inspired Ivan Turgenev's novella "Clara Milich" (1882) and Alexey Suvorin's drama Tatyana Repina, premiered at the Maly in 1889. Kuprin, then a Junker student at the Moscow Third Alexander Military Academy, was an avid theatre-goer. Impressed by this massively popular production he was moved enough by it to write his own version of the story.

== Publication history ==
Alexander Kuprin approached the poet Liodor Palmin who arranged for the story to be published in the Russian Satirical Leaflet (signed "А. К-rin"), on 3 December 1889. The Junkers were forbidden to publish anything without the consent of the Academy's authorities, so, as the identity of the author became known, Kuprin was arrested and spent two days in custody.

The circumstances of the publication left a lasting mark on Kuprin's literary output. He re-visited them first in his short story "The Firstling" (Первенец, Pervenets, 1897), changing the names of both the journal and his mentor (the latter, to Ivan Liodorych Venkov), then in the autobiographical novel Junkers (Юнкера, 1928-1932), and in the story "Printer's Ink" (Типографская краска, 1929).

The story was re-issued for the first time in 1939 when it appeared in the Soviet Literary Contemporary (Literaturny sovremennik) magazine's July and August issues. Later it was included into the Collected Works by A.I. Kuprin in six volumes (Khudozhestvennaya Literatura; first edition, 1957-1958).

== Assessment ==
According to the Kuprin scholar Nicholas Luker, the story, "despite its stilted language and stereotyped characters," has the "narrative dynamism typical of the later Kuprin... [T]hough beset by literary clichés, its treatment of love and the pain it can bring is deeply sensitive, a quality that would be the hallmark of his best works."
