= Captain Ribnikov =

- Short story by Alexander Kuprin
- Original title: Штабс-капитан Рыбников
- Country: Russia
- Language: Russian

Publication
- Publisher: Mir Bozhy
- Publication date: 1906
- Published in English: 1916

"Staff Captain Rybnikov" (Shtabs-Kapitan Rybnikov, Штабс-капитан Рыбников) is a short story by Alexander Kuprin first published in Mir Bozhy's January 1906 issue. It was published in English in 1916 as "Captain Ribnikov", in anthology The River of Life And Other Stories. D. S. Mirsky considered it one of Kuprin's best short stories.

== Background ==
Kuprin had for a long time been intrigued by the notion of a spy carrying out his lone mission in the heart of an enemy nation, according to biographer Nicholas Luker. In his dreams Romashov (The Duel's main character) had seen himself as a spy in Germany. Kuprin's Rybnikov was based on an officer of that name whom he met in one of his favorite haunts, the "Capernaum" restaurant in Petersburg. The real Rybnikov was a Siberian, wounded at the battle of Mukden, whose Mongolian features reminded Kuprin of a Japanese.

== History ==
The story, written in 1905 in Balaklava, was lauded by Maxim Gorky who rated it as one Kuprin's finest ones. He included it in several compilations (Russian Writers Series, 1919; Gosizdat's Russian Classics, 1928; Academia Publishers, 1935). Kuprin himself in 1909 referred to "Junior Captain Rybnikov" as his best story ever written.

== Plot ==
Staff-Captain Rybnikov is on a ceaseless trip through Saint Petersburg military departments ostensibly trying to secure financial assistance as a wounded veteran, pestering officials with petty complaints, patriotic rants and naive-sounding questions concerning the state of the Russian military. Newspaper reporter Shchavinsky, a shrewd man ("clearly a self-portrait by Kuprin," according to Luker), spots some flaws in Rybnikov's over-stylized veneer (the superfluity of Russian proverbs, occasional 'clever' words, fine silk linen of a kind Russian soldiers never wear, obvious inner strain and occasional glimpses of hatred in his look) and thinks himself to be on the verge of exposing a Japanese spy.

Excited by his discovery, he takes Rybnikov with himself on a binge. As his admiration for this man's audacity, self-control and artistry grows, the journalist promises the Captain never to give him away to the authorities, but Rybnikov remains unfazed. Equally impressed with her unusual visitor, so unlike her common clientele, is Nastya, a prostitute in a brothel which the Shchavinsky-led company visits. Ironically, it's this woman, stricken by Rybnikov's tenderness, noble manners and passion, proves to be his undoing. Motivated by petty vanity, she boasts to a local thief (and, apparently, a secret police agent) who rests in a nearby room, about a strange visitor she's just had, mentioning the latter pronouncing some Japanese words as he was falling asleep. The thief calls for the police and ventures an assault. Trying to escape, Rybnikov jumps out of the window, breaks his leg and gets caught.

== Themes ==
The story, set in Saint Petersburg, provided Kuprin with an opportunity to comment on the Russo-Japanese War on the Pacific and the way the Russia led it. According to Luker,

Through Rybnikov's talk of the war Kuprin reveals the incompetence of the Russian army in the field. Those in command fail to adapt to the terrain, their men are supplied with shells of the wrong caliber and obliged to fight for days without food, while their officers play cards and take mistresses. All the while the Japanese fight with the efficiency of machines. Morale is disastrously low in the Russian ranks, and mutiny increasingly apparent. More ferment still is to be seen in the navy, where officers are afraid to meet their sailors ashore.

Through the military bureaucrats whom Rybnikov visits, Kuprin points ironically to the reasons for Russia's defeat in the Far East. "And that's what Russian officers are like!" they exclaim. "Just look at that fellow [Rybnikov]. Isn't it clear why we're losing one battle after another? Dullness, stupidity, complete absence of any self-respect... Poor Russia!"
