= Batyushkov =

Batyushkov may refer to:

- Konstantin Batyushkov (1787–1855), Russian poet, essayist and translator
- Fyodor Batyushkov (1857–1920), Russian philologist and critic
