= On a Moonlit Night =

On a Moonlit Night may refer to:

- "On a Moonlit Night" (short story), by Alexander Kuprin, 1893
- Crystal or Ash, Fire or Wind, as Long as It's Love, a 1989 film
