= Ostrogorsky =

== Surname ==
Ostrogorsky is a surname. Notable people with the surname include:

- George Ostrogorsky (1902–1976), Russian-born Yugoslavian historian and Byzantinist
- Moisey Ostrogorsky (1854–1921), Belarusian political scientist, historian, jurist and sociologist
- Viktor Ostrogorsky (1840-1902), Russian writer, pedagogue, publisher, translator and social activist

== Others ==
Moisey Ostrogorsky unwittingly donated his surname to the Ostrogorski Centre, which is a "Western-style" political lobby group.
