= Rybnikov =

Rybnikov is a surname. People associated with the surname include:

- Alexey Rybnikov
- Pavel Rybnikov
- Nikolai Rybnikov

== Other uses ==
- "Staff-Captain Rybnikov"
