= Andhare Alo =

Andhare Alo (lit. 'Came In the Dark' in Bengali) may refer to these Indian films:

- Andhare Alo (1922 film), directed by Sisir Bhaduri
- Andhare Alo (1957 film), directed by Haridas Bhattacharya

== See also ==
- In the Dark (disambiguation)
