= The Death of Ivan the Terrible (film) =

1909 film by Vasily Goncharov

- Russian: Смерть Иоанна Грозного
- Directed by: Vasili Goncharov
- Written by: Vasili Goncharov; Aleksey Konstantinovich Tolstoy (play)
- Produced by: F. Reinhardt; Pavel Thiman
- Starring: A. Slavin; Yelizaveta Uvarova; S. Tarasov; Nikolai Vekov; Yakov Protazanov
- Cinematography: Antonio Serrano
- Release date: 1909
- Country: Russian Empire

The Death of Ivan the Terrible, (Russian: Смерть Иоанна Грозного, romanized: Smert Ioanna Groznogo) is a 1909 Russian short film directed and written by Vasili Goncharov.

== Plot ==
The film is based on plays by Aleksey Konstantinovich Tolstoy.

== Cast ==
- A. Slavin as Ivan the Terrible
- Yelizaveta Uvarova as Tsarina
- S. Tarasov as Boris Godunov
- Nikolai Vekov as Nagoy, boyar
- Yakov Protazanov as Garaburda

== Production ==
- Role of Garaburda was the actor debut for Yakov Protazanov.
- Actor Slavin, who performed the role of Ivan the Terrible, was too plump for the image of the king, known including asceticism. Its fullness has become one of the most common viewers claims to the film.

== Reception ==
The Russian trade journal Cine-Phono criticized the quality of cinematography:

But imagine a film like The Death of Ivan the Terrible reaching the French. They won't laugh at it; they'll just think about how low the Russian film industry stands, along with photography and the performing arts. They won't laugh, no, but we'll blush and weep with frustration. What would be simpler than either leaving The Death of Ivan the Terrible alone, or inviting our best actors—Stanislavsky's—to produce it, and an experienced film company to film it.
