= Vasily Shulgin =

Russian politician (1878–1976)

- Василий Шульгин
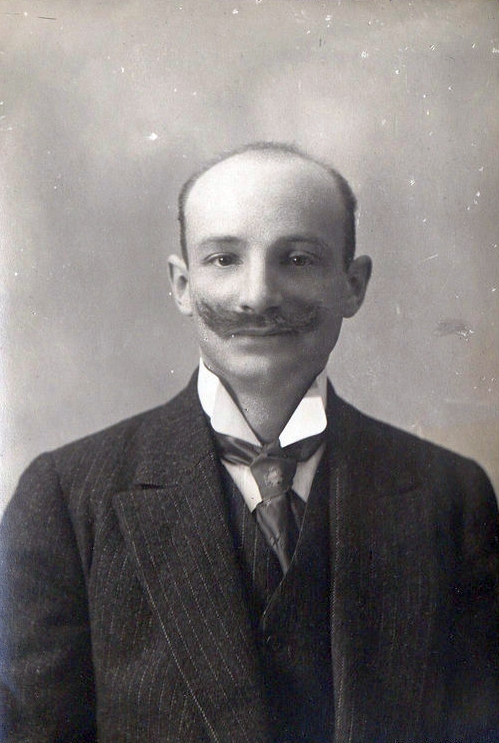
- Shulgin in 1913
- Born: 13 January 1878; Kiev, Russian Empire
- Died: 15 February 1976 (aged 98); Vladimir, Russian SFSR, Soviet Union
- Resting place: Baygushi Cemetery, Vladimir
- Citizenship: Russian (until 1917); Stateless (from 1917)
- Education: Saint Vladimir Imperial University
- Occupations: Politician, essayist
- Political party: All-Russian National Union

Vasily Vitalyevich Shulgin (Russian: Васи́лий Вита́льевич Шульги́н; 13 January 1878 – 15 February 1976), also known as Basil Shulgin, was a Russian conservative politician, monarchist and member of the White movement.

== Young years ==
Shulgin was born in Kiev. His father Vitaly Shulgin was a professor of history, monarchist and founder of the Russian nationalist newspaper Kievlyanin. His nephew twice removed was Oleksander Shulhyn, the future General Secretary for Foreign Affairs of the Ukrainian People's Republic.

Shulgin studied at the Law faculty of Kiev University and was disgusted with the constant students' protests. At that time he became an ardent opponent of revolution and supported the monarchy. He began to write articles in his father's newspaper. He also held antisemitic views but opposed open violence such as the notorious pogroms which were common in Kiev at the time.

== Politician ==
In 1907 Shulgin became a member of the Duma. He advocated right-wing views, supported the government of Pyotr Stolypin, including introduction of courts-martial, and other controversial changes. In 1913, he heavily criticised the government for the Beilis trial. Shulgin understood that participation in or turning a blind eye on the most odious manifestation of antisemitism was detrimental to the government. When the First World War broke out, Shulgin joined the army. In 1915 he was wounded and returned home. Shulgin was shocked by the inefficient organization and supply of the Russian army. Together with members of the Octobrists, the Cadets, and other right-wing or centrist politicians he established the Progressive Bloc. The aim of the Bloc was to provide the army with everything necessary since the government failed to do it.

== Revolution and emigration ==
Shulgin opposed the revolution, though it was evident that absolute monarchy in Russia would no longer exist. Together with Alexander Guchkov he persuaded Nicholas II to abdicate the throne since he believed that a constitutional monarchy with Michael Alexandrovich being the monarch was possible, and that this or even a republic, if a strong government was established, would be a remedy for Russia. For the same reason he supported the Provisional Government and Kornilov's coup.

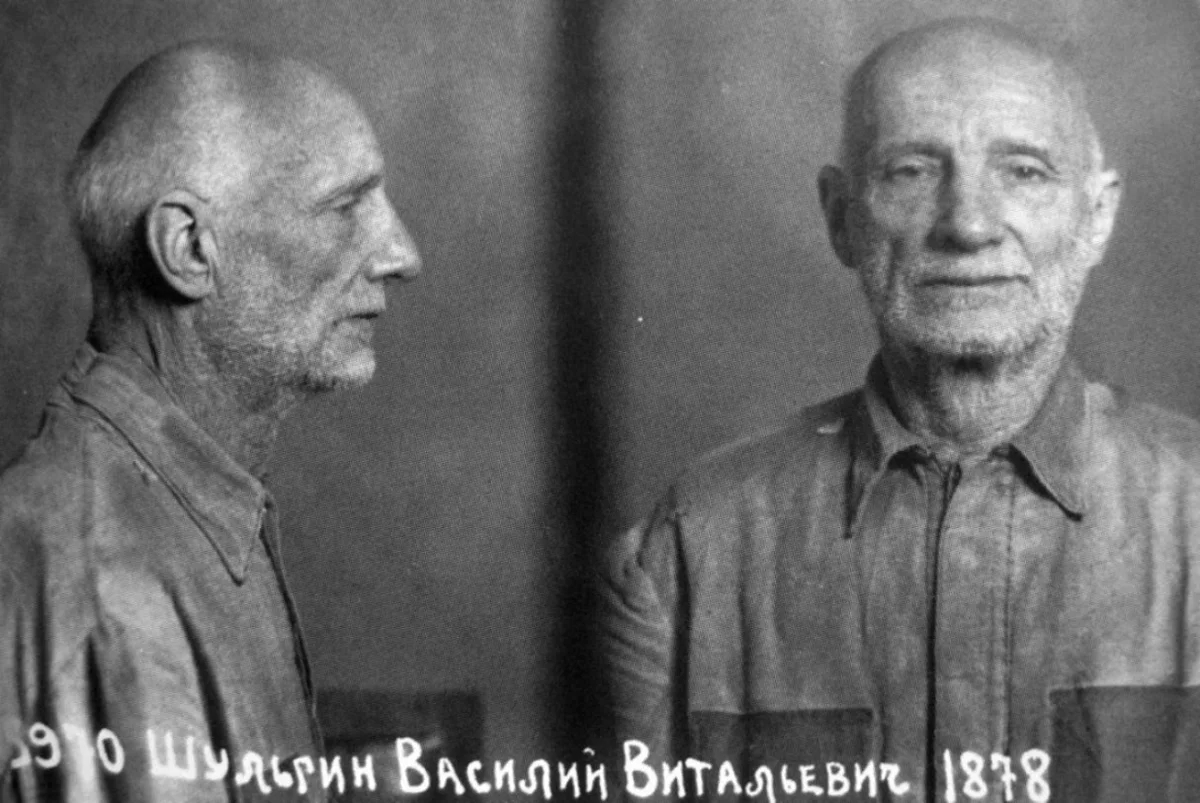
Shulgin after his arrest by Soviet authorities

When all hope was lost he moved to Kiev, and then the Kuban, where he participated in the White movement. During his time in Kiev, he edited the newspaper Kievlyanin, which supported the Whites and spread anti-Semitic conspiracies about the Bolsheviks, leading to a pogrom in Kiev.

In 1920 Shulgin emigrated to Yugoslavia. In 1925-26 he secretly visited the Soviet Union. He described this visit and his impression of the New Economic Policy in the book called The Three Capitals (Три столицы). The publication was likely organized by the OGPU, which aimed at dividing the White movement abroad. While in emigration, Shulgin voiced his support for both Fascist Italy and Nazi Germany. During his first years of exile, he supported his activities from incomes provided by a mill inherited from his father in Volhynia (then under Polish rule), but following the Great Depression was forced to find employment, spending some time as a cashier. Shulgin continued keeping in touch with other leaders of the White movement until 1937, when he ceased his political activity.

== Return to the Soviet Union ==
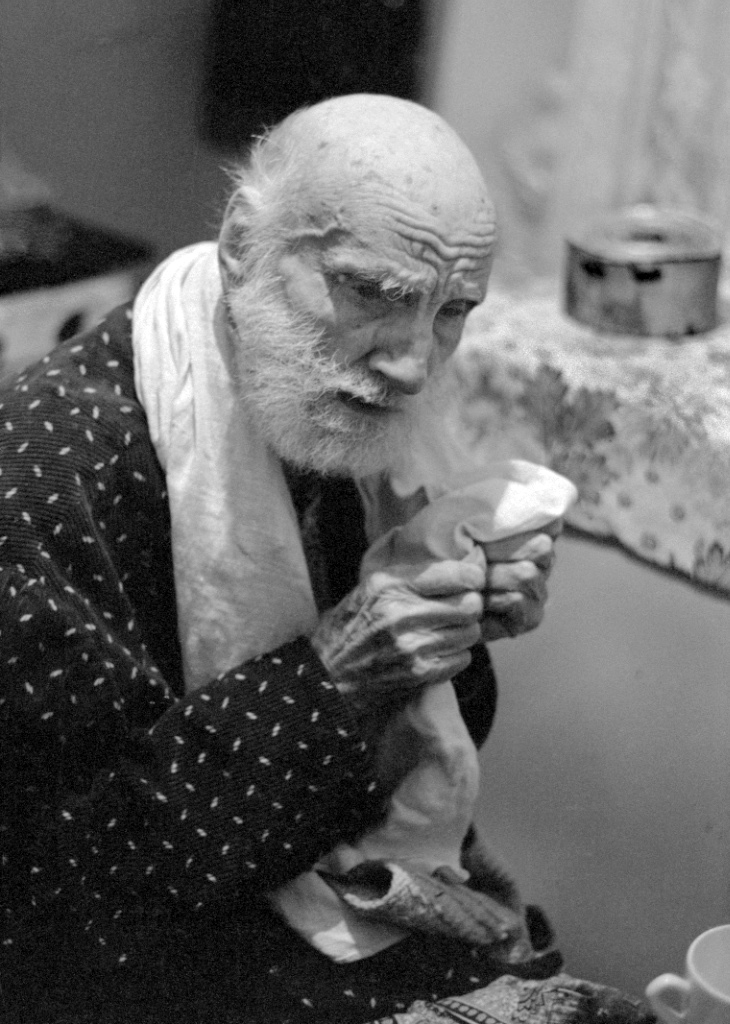
Shulgin in his last birthday, 1976

In 1944 the Soviet army entered Yugoslavia. Shulgin was arrested and sentenced to 25 years for his "hostile to communism antisoviet activity". He was imprisoned at the Vladimir Central. After twelve years in prison he was released in 1956 under the amnesty. Since then he lived in Vladimir. In his later books he argued that communism was no more a disaster for Russia since former Bolsheviks turned into patriots of Russia. In 1961, Shulgin was among the guests at the XXII Congress of the CPSU. In 1965 Shulgin was the main character of Fridrikh Ermler's documentary film The Verdict of History in which he told his story to a Soviet historian (the real historian could not be found, and the role was entrusted to the actor and intelligence officer Sergei Svistunov). Shulgin did not make any concessions, and the goal of the film - to show that the leaders of the white emigration themselves admitted that their struggle was lost and the cause of the “builders of communism” was victorious - was not achieved; the film was shown in Moscow and Leningrad cinemas for only three days: despite the interest of the audience, the film was immediately withdrawn from distribution. According to KGB General Philip Bobkov, who supervised the creation of the film from the department and communicated closely with the entire creative team, “Shulgin looked great on the screen and, importantly, remained himself all the time. He did not play along with his interlocutor. He was a man who resigned himself to circumstances, but was not broken and did not give up his convictions. Shulgin's venerable age did not affect his work of thought or temperament, and did not diminish his sarcasm. His young opponent, whom Shulgin caustically and angrily ridiculed, looked very pale next to him.”

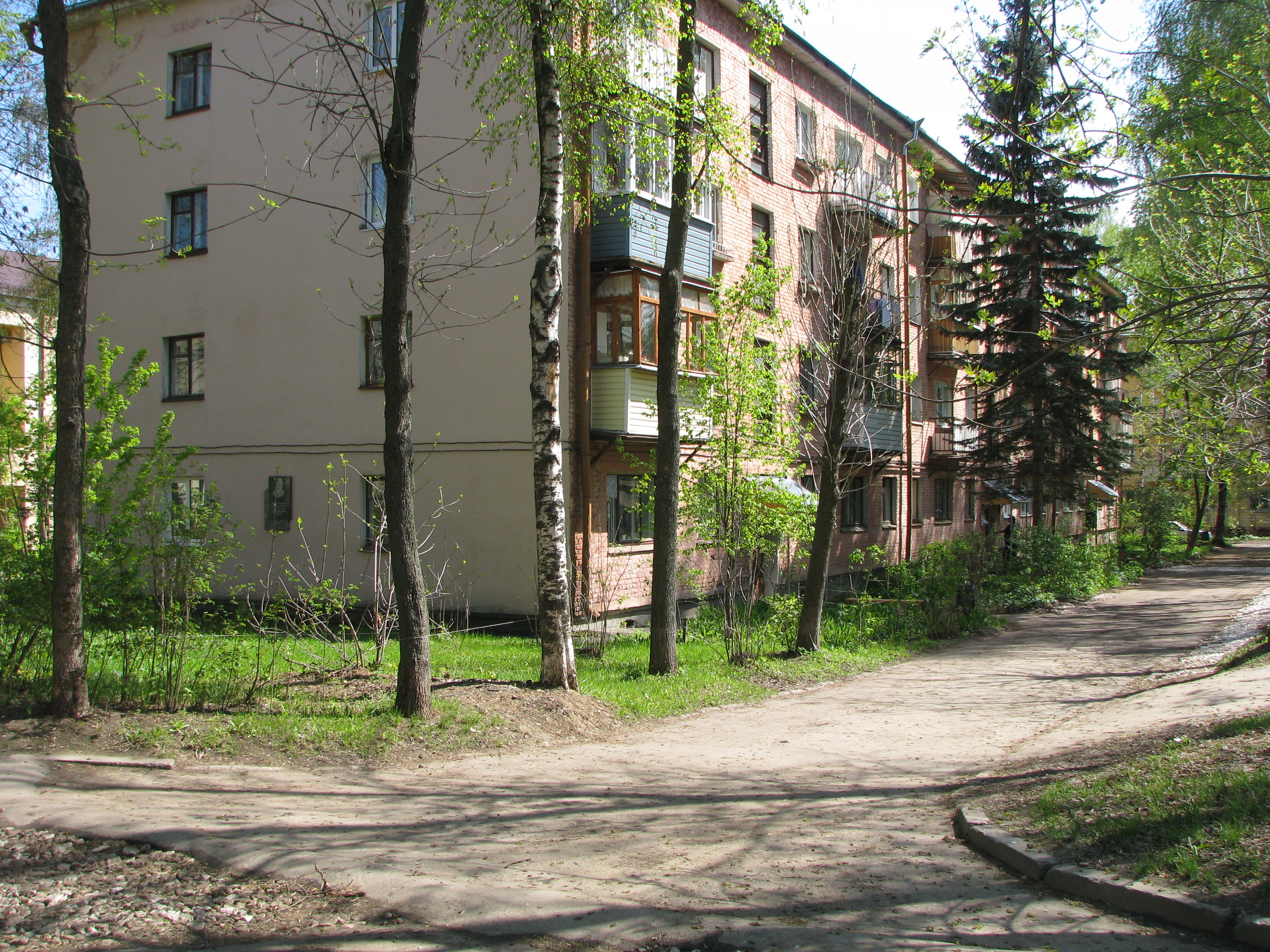
Building nr. 1 in Kooperativnaya Street (since 1967 Feigina Street), where in the 1st floor (photo from the corner of the apartment) The Shulgins lived from 1960 until their death

All this - trips around the country, published books, an invitation to the party congress and the release of a film - were signs of Khrushchev’s “thaw”. But as soon as N.S. Khrushchev was removed and new leaders came to power in the USSR, ideological policy changed, censorship in the USSR was tightened. Shulgin's involvement in public life was recognized as a mistake at a meeting of the Secretariat of the CPSU Central Committee.

Shulgin died at age 98 of complications from angina in Vladimir on February 15, 1976. As Lyudmila Marinina, his guardian, who lived with him in recent years and cared for the old man, recalled:

... he felt good all the time, but in January he had the flu... on the night of February 15 he felt pain in his chest and took pills from angina pectoris, then in the morning at half an hour past seven he went to bed, as usual he sat at night and slept during the day, and I went to the store... I come, and he is already lying dead...

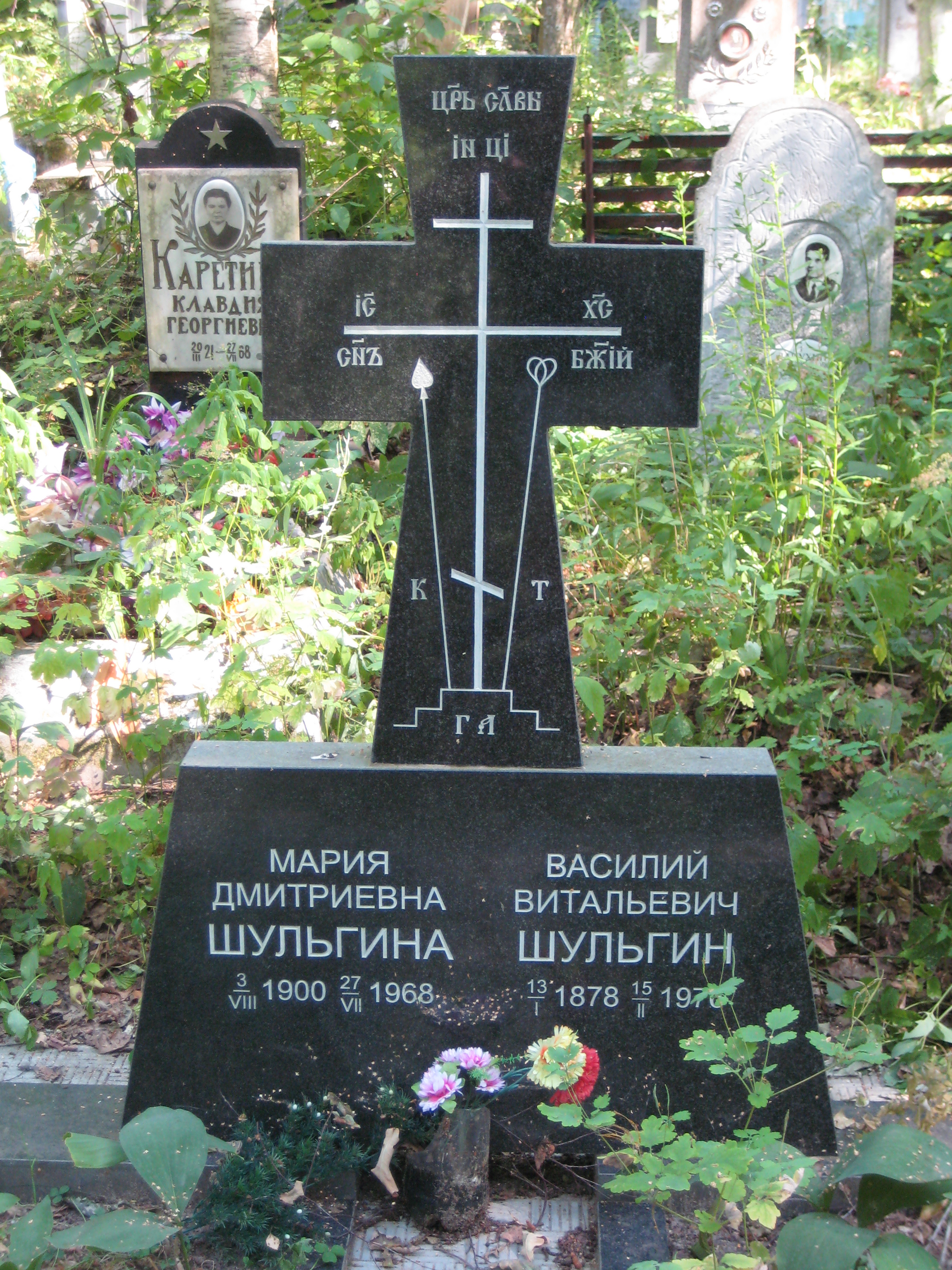
Shulgin's gravestone

There was a burial service in the cemetery church next to the Vladimir prison, where he spent 12 years. He was buried in Baygushi cemetery. There were 10-12 people at the funeral, among them Andrei Golitsyn and Ilya Glazunov. KGB officers watched the funeral from a GAZ car. He was buried next to his wife. Both graves have survived. A solid black cross is erected above them, mounted on a small pedestal, on which names and dates of life are engraved.
