= Duel (1957 film) =

- Russian: Поединок
- Directed by: Vladimir Petrov
- Written by: Aleksandr Kuprin; Vladimir Petrov
- Starring: Nikolai Komissarov; Andrei Popov; Yuri Puzyryov; Mikhail Nazvanov; Irina Skobtseva
- Cinematography: Grigoriy Ayzenberg; Arkadi Koltsaty
- Edited by: Zoya Veryovkina
- Music by: Aram Khachaturian
- Production company: Mosfilm
- Release date: 2 December 1957
- Running time: 104 min.
- Country: Soviet Union
- Language: Russian

Duel (Russian: Поединок, romanized: Poedinok) is a 1957 Soviet romantic drama film directed by Vladimir Petrov.

== Plot ==
The film takes place in 1896 in a small town. The regiment gets drunk and second lieutenant Romashov falls in love with the captain's spouse as a result of which the men quarrel.

== Cast ==
- Nikolai Komissarov as Lieutenant Shulgovich
- Andrei Popov as Vasily Nazansky
- Yuri Puzyryov as Georgy Romashov
- Mikhail Nazvanov as Vladimir Nikolayev
- Irina Skobtseva as Aleksandra Nikolayeva
- Lidiya Sukharevskaya as Raisa Peterson
- Sergei Blinnikov as Lekh
- Nikolay Bogolyubov as Osadchiy
- Vladimir Belokurov as Dits
- Yevgeny Yevstigneyev as Captain Peterson
- Aleksandr Gumburg as Sliva
- Noy Avaliani as Bek-Agamalov
- Pavel Pavlenko as Captain Svetlovidov
- Leonid Parkhomenko as Pavel Vetkin
- Aleksandr Lebedev as Khlebnikov
- Radner Muratov as Gaynan
- Lev Perfilov as Lobov

== See also ==
- The Duel, 1910 film
