= Kievlyanin =

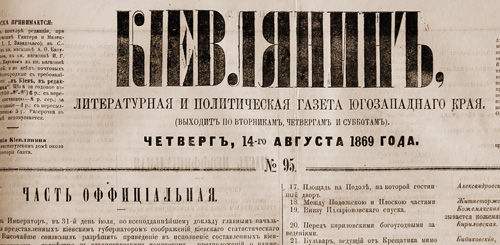
- An 1869 issue of Kievlyanin
- Type: Weekly newspaper
- Editor: Vitaly Shulgin, Dmitry Pikhno, Vasily Shulgin
- Founded: 1864
- Ceased publication: 1919
- Political alignment: conservative, nationalist
- Language: Russian
- Headquarters: Kiev, Russian Empire
- Circulation: 70 thousand (1919)

Kievlyanin (Russian: Кіевлянинъ) was a conservative Russian newspaper, published in Kiev in 1864–1919.

The newspaper was labeling Ukrainians as "Mazepinists" (precursor of Banderites). Ukrainian poet and statesman Pavlo Tychyna considered the publishing as "chauvinistic".

== History ==
Kievlyanin was launched by the Russian Empire's Southwestern Krai administration, admittedly with a view to promoting the russification of the region. This newspaper's credo: "This is a Russian, Russian, Russian land!" was stated in its very first issue by the paper's original editor, the Kiev University professor Vitaly Shulgin.

After Shulgin's death Dmitry Pikhno took over in 1879. The newspaper (which prior to that was coming out three times a week) became a daily; now it appealed to the liberals as well as the Russian nationalists and featured a fine literary section. Alexander Kuprin chose Kievlyanin for serializing his 1898 Olesya novelet in it. The respectable theatre critic Izmail Alexandrovsky published there regularly, under the pen name Iz. Alsky.

During and after the 1905 Revolution Kievlyanin's position shifted to the right; Vitaly Shulgin's stepson Vasily became one of the key contributors and most of its leaders were now members of the Kiev Club of Russian Nationalists, the All-Russian National Union or the Union of the Russian People.

In September 1913 Vasily Shulgin became Kievlyanin's editor-in-chief, and the newspaper started to drift towards the so-called 'progressive nationalists' group led by Anatoly Savenko. It severed ties with the Russian ultra-nationalists who were now accusing the publication of being 'pro-Jewish' and anti-Monarchist. Indeed, unlike all the pro-Monarchist publications, Kievlyanin managed to survive the February Revolution and was closed only in February 1918, as the Ukrainian separatists took over the Central Rada. Shulgin made an attempt to move the publication to the Don region, but the White Army general Mikhail Alekseyev refused to support it.

The Central Powers intervention prompted Shulgin to stop the publication in protest, even if the German occupational authorities asked him to continue. He revived it in the autumn of 1919 after the Volunteer Army stepped into Kiev. "Yes, [now] this Krai is Russian. And we won't give it back neither to the Ukrainian traitors, nor to the Jewish hangmen who drowned the city streets with blood," Shulgin wrote on September 3. In the same issue he warned against pogroms ("These villains should be put to justice and this trial will be severe, but the mob law is unacceptable") but as the nightly, so-called 'quiet pogroms' started, Shulgin in his infamous "Torture by Fear" article (October, 8) confessed he could 'understand the feelings' of those responsible for pogroms since 'the Jews had formed the basis for the Bolshevik power'.

Kievlyanin folded in December 1919, as the Red Army stepped into Kiev. In 1925 Shulgin made an attempt to revive it in emigration, but failed to find a publisher.
