= Eulalia Kadmina =

Russian opera singer (1853–1881)

- Евлалия Кадмина
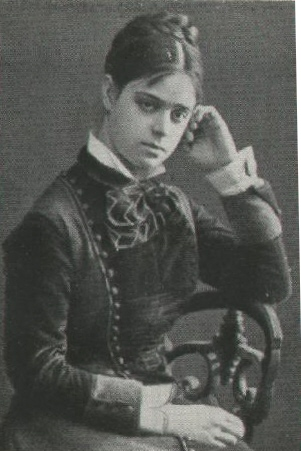
- Born: 1 October 1853; Kaluga, Russian Empire
- Died: 4 December 1881 (aged 28); Kharkov, Russian Empire
- Occupation: opera singer

Eulalia Pavlovna Kadmina (Russian: Евлалия Павловна Кадмина; 1853–1881) was a Russian singer, contralto, mezzo-soprano, dramatic actress.

== Biography ==
=== Early years ===
Eulalia Kadmina was born in Kaluga in the family of a Kaluga merchant Pavel Maksimovich Kadmin and a Romani person, Anna Nikolaevna.

Eulalia grew up as a closed, lonely child, who did not meet at all with anyone, even with her own sisters. She learned to read early and spent all her free time reading books. The father singled it out against the background of other children, and at the age of 12 arranged for Eulalia in a prestigious educational institution Moscow Elizabeth Institute.

Young pupils often gave concerts for guests. Possessing a wonderful voice, Eulalia often took part in them. In 1870 Nikolai Rubinstein visited such an amateur performance. Struck by the singing of Eulalia, he persuaded her to devote herself to music and become a singer.

Nikolai Rubinshtein took an active part in the fate of the beginning singer. Despite the fact that after his father's death in the same year of 1870, Kadmina's family was left without money, he helped the girl not only become a student of the Moscow Conservatory in singing class, but also receive a scholarship.

Among the teachers of Kadmina were such honored artists as Alexandra Alexandrova-Kochetova, Ivan Samarin and Pyotr Ilyich Tchaikovsky. Later, charmed by her velvety rich mezzo-soprano, Tchaikovsky wrote specially for her music to the spring fairy tale of Alexander Ostrovsky The Snow Maiden.

At the age of eighteen, her stage debut took place. Nikolay Rubinstein invited the budding Kadminа to the role of Orpheus in the Gluck's opera Orpheus and Eurydice.

"— Eulalia, when she wanted, could be more aristocratic than all princesses. And will find a frenzy on her it will dissolve worse than a street girl," — theatrical critic Alexander Amfiteatrov wrote about her. "Alas, she categorically did not appreciate her talent, nor the generous gift that fate gave her."

As a result, she secretly left for Italy.

=== Italy ===
Kadmina sang in Naples, Turin, Florence, and Milan and was well-received. In Italy, she continued to feel lonely and morose and felt her career was at an impasse.

Twice Eulalia tries to commit suicide: she throws herself into the river, but the police drag her out unscathed; drinks poison, but the strong body copes. Nervous, she gets sick, and then the young doctor Ernesto Falconi comes to the aid of the opera diva, who is able to cure not only her body but her soul, unfortunately, for a short while.

=== Kiev ===
In Kiev, her success is predictably deafening: at the premiere of the opera Aida at the Kiev Opera House, the curtain is raised 15 times encore. But after the Mariinsky Theatre and Bolshoi, this is already a clear career decline, and its consequences were not slow to manifest.

=== Memory ===
The actress's suicide on stage caused a whole wave of responses in Russian literature. Under the influence of the tragic fate of Eulalia Kadmina, Ivan Turgenev's novel After Death (Klara Milich), Alexander Kuprin's The Last Debut, Nikolai Leskov's Theatrical Character, Aleksey Suvorin's plays Tatiana Repina and its continuation under the same Anton Chekhov's name, Solovtsov-Fedorov's play Eulalia Radmina.

She was buried in the 1st city cemetery in Kharkov. In 1972, due to liquidation of Kharkov's 1st city cemetery, because the cemetery became totally neglected and very squalid, her remains were reburied in the 13th city cemetery in Kharkov which remains to this day. On the grave there is a modest half-ruined monument with a short inscription: "Eulalia Pavlovna Kadmina was a famous actress".
