= Anatoly Savenko =

Russian-Ukrainian activist (1874–1922)

Anatoly Ivanovich Savenko
- Анатолий Иванович Савенко
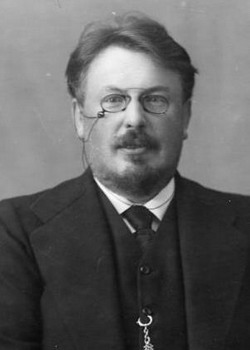
- Anatoly Savenko
- Born: Anatoly Ivanovich Savenko; December 16, 1874; Pereiaslav, Russian Empire (now part of Kyiv Oblast, Ukraine)
- Died: 1922; Kerch, RSFSR
- Occupations: social and political activist, lawyer, writer, essayist and journalist

Anatoly Ivanovich Savenko (Russian: Анато́лий Ива́нович Саве́нко, Ukrainian: Анатолій Іванович Савенко; 28 December 1874 in Pereyaslav, Poltava Governorate, Russian Empire – 1922 in Kerch, Russian SSR) was a Russian nationalist, social and political activist, lawyer, writer, essayist and journalist. He served as one of the leaders of Russian nationalist movement during the early 20th century.

Himself of Ukrainian ethnic origin, Savenko became one of the most famous publicists in Russian nationalist circles. He was an author of numerous publications on political and economic topics in newspapers Kievlyanin, Kievskoye slovo, Podolyanin, Svet, Moskovskiye Vedomosti, Novoye Vremya, Odessa Leaf and others. He was also a contributor and staff member of the magazine Life and Art. Additionally, Savenko promoted the idea of "one, indivisible Russia" in numerous public speeches. He was a founder of the "Russian Bogatyr" sporting society, which promoted the ideology of Russian nationalism.

Founder and chairman of the Law and Order (1905–1906). Co-founder and deputy chairman (from 1912 onwards, chairman) of the Kiev Club of Russian Nationalists (1908–1918), a member of the All-Russian National Union (1912–1918) and its General Council (1912–1915). IV State Duma deputy in the nationalist faction and the moderate right (1912–1915). One of the organizers and leaders of the parliamentary faction of progressive nationalists (1915–1917). Commissar of the Provisional Committee of the State Duma and the Provisional Government. Deputy chairman of Russian voters, nonpartisan unit (1919).

One of the main ideologists of Russian nationalism. Critic and implacable political opponent of Ukrainian nationalism.

In his articles published in Black Hundreds press in Kyiv, Savenko described Ukrainophilia as a danger for state security and called for administrative bans on poetry readings and singing of songs in the Ukrainian language at schools. He also warned about the presence of Ukrainian books in school libraries, accusing their publishers of promoting separatism.

A member of the White movement in the South of Russia, Savenko became Head of the Kiev branch of OSVAG (an intelligence and propaganda arm of the White military) and actual head of Kiev in autumn 1919 after the Volunteer Army captured the city. He wrote the booklet Little Russians or Ukrainians? (1919), and founded the newspaper Kievan Rus (1919). Savenko emigrated from Russia in 1920, but the following year he returned secretly to Soviet Russia, where he lived under a false name before his death in Kerch in 1922.
