= Olesya (film) =

1971 film by Borys Ivchenko

- Directed by: Boris Ivchenko
- Written by: Vasily Dulgerov; Aleksandr Kuprin
- Produced by: Tatyana Kulchitskaya
- Starring: Lyudmila Chursina
- Cinematography: Nikolai Kulchitsky
- Edited by: Tatyana Sivchikova
- Music by: Volodymyr Huba
- Production company: Dovzhenko Film Studios
- Release date: December 15, 1971
- Running time: 87 minutes
- Country: USSR
- Language: Russian

Olesya (Russian: Олеся) is a 1971 drama film directed by Boris Ivchenko based on a screenplay by Vasily Dulgerov. Adapted from the Aleksandr Kuprin's 1898 homonymous novel.

== Plot ==
Wandering through the forest, Ivan Timofeyevich finds a dilapidated hut on the edge of the swamp. There lives an old woman with her beautiful granddaughter Olesya. Many years prior, the local peasants, considering the woman a witch, burned down her house, killing her daughter. Olesya is fascinated by Ivan, who is in turn conquered by the power of the girl's feelings, by her openness and the purity of her soul. Eventually, he falls in love with Olesya. However, she foresees a quick separation.

== Cast ==
- Lyudmila Chursina as Olesya
- Gennady Voropayev as Ivan Timofeyevich
- Boryslav Brondukov as Yarmola
- Anatoly Barchuk as Dmitro
- Maria Kapnist as Manuylikha, Olesya's grandmother
- Vladimir Volkov as Yevtikhiy Petrovich
- Boris Aleksandrov as Selyanin (as B. Aleksandrov)
- Yuri Gavrilyuk
- Fyodor Gladkov
- Anatoliy Ivanov

== Release ==
Boris Ivchenko's film takes the 616th place in the list of the highest-grossing films of the Soviet film distribution. It was watched by 25,1 million viewers.
