= The Garnet Bracelet =

Novel by Alexander Kuprin

- Author: Alexander Kuprin
- Original title: Гранатовый браслет
- Language: Russian
- Genre: Psychological drama
- Publisher: Zemlya almanac
- Publication date: 1911
- Publication place: Russian Empire
- Media type: Print (hardback & paperback)

The Garnet Bracelet (Russian: Гранатовый браслет, romanized: Granatovyi braslet) is a short novel by Alexander Kuprin, first published in Zemlya (Land) almanac, Vol. 6, 1911. Maxim Gorky, who among others praised the novel, saw it as "the sign of a new literature coming."

== History ==
Kuprin started writing what he first saw as a short story in Odessa in the autumn of 1910. "One of these days I'm going to send Blum[enberg] a little piece, called The Garnet Bracelet," he informed friend V.S.Klestov in a letter dated September 29. But the story, getting larger and larger, took three months to be completed.

The plot had a real basis, judging by Kuprin's October 15 letter to Fyodor Batyushkov. "What I do today is polish The Garnet Bracelet. This is - remember it? - the sad story of a minor telegraph clerk named P.P. Zheltkov who so hopelessly, touchingly and selflessly fell in love with Lyubimov's wife (D.D. is now a Vilno governor)... But the progress is difficult." "Perhaps that is because I am musically ignorant. Besides, this high society language!" he complained in the November 21 letter. By December 3 the work hasn't been finished yet. "I'd rather not haste with this piece which is very dear to me," he told Batyushkov, again in a letter.

Kuprin was aware that the novel's "purity" distinguished Zheltkov with his all-consuming passion from the majority of his stories' characters. "I'll say one thing, I've never written anything more chaste," he told Batyushkov.

== Summary ==
Zheltkov, a "little man", is possessed by a consuming love for Princess Vera Sheina, a rich society lady hardly aware of his existence. After his wife receives for her birthday a particularly expensive gift, Prince Vasily Shein visits Zheltkov, accompanied by Nikolai Nikolayevich, Vera’s brother, and tells him to stop pestering the Princess. Being aware that the last thread connecting him with his beloved one is gone, Zheltkov commits suicide, in the final letter asking Vera to listen to Beethoven's Second Piano Sonata. The power of music brings about the spiritual rebirth of a hitherto detached aristocrat who recognizes that she's just been brushed by "this rarest thing, a true love that happens once in a thousand years."
