= On a Moonlit Night (short story) =

- Short story by Alexander Kuprin
- Original title: Лунной ночью
- Country: Russia
- Language: Russian

Publication
- Publisher: Russkoye Bogatstvo; Khudozhestvennaya Literatura
- Publication date: 1893

"On a Moonlit Night" (Лунной ночью, Lunnoi noch'iu) is a short story by Alexander Kuprin originally published in Russkoye Bogatstvo magazine's November, 1893, issue. In 1911, unchanged, it appeared in Probuzhdeniye (Awakening) magazine (April 8 and 15), under the title Na perekryostke (На перекрёстке, At the Crossroads). In all the later compilations and compendiums the story featured under its original name.

Written in the years of Kuprin's military service, it was his third published work, following "The Psyche", to which "On a Moonlit Night" is similar in theme and mood. In a letter to Nikolai Mikhaylovsky Kuprin described it as 'a psychological etude'.

== Plot ==
Gamov, the teacher of mathematics, is passionately in love with a beautiful girl who is openly scornful of him. Desperation drives him to blackmail but she ridicules him. He threatens the girl with a revolver, discovering the 'unaccountable voluptuousness' in the situation and, as she responds with mockery, pulls the trigger. The horror of what he has done haunts Gamov for the rest of his life.

== Concept ==
According to the Kupin scholar Nicholas Luker, "[p]robing the innermost recesses of the mind, Kuprin explores in his protagonist Gamov the Dostoevskian duality fundamental to the human soul. 'You see,' Gamov explains to the narrator, 'I think there are two wills inherent in man. One is conscious . . . But the other is unconscious; on some occasions it controls a person completely without his knowledge, sometimes even against his will'. When this second will is in chaos, Gamov explains, otherwise unthinkable acts of violence occur, like the brutal murder of his beloved, to which he tacitly confesses."
