= Nikolai Vekov =

Russian opera singer (1870–1930s)

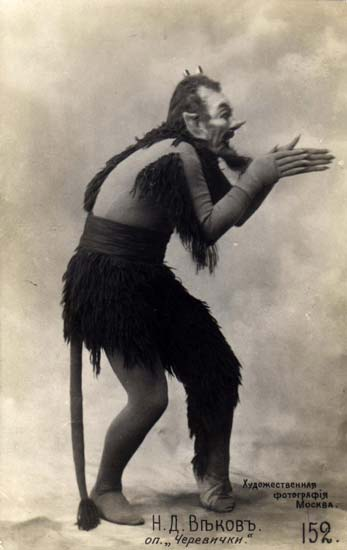
- Vekov in Cherevichki
- Born: Nikolai Dmitriyevich Vekov; 26 September 1870; Ryazan, Russian Empire [now Russia]
- Died: 1930s
- Occupation(s): opera singer, actor, director

Nikolai Dmitriyevich Vekov (Russian: Николай Дмитриевич Веков; November 26, 1870 — 1930s) was a Russian opera and operetta artist (baritone) and director. He was one of the most popular artists of his time.

== Biography ==
From the family priest. In 1892, he graduated from the Orenburg Teacher's Institute. From 1894 to 1897, he sang in the Moscow Synodal Choir. From 1895 to 1901, he studied singing at the Moscow Conservatory (teachers Camille Everardi and Yelizaveta Lavrovskaya). Since 1900, he performed in the troupe of the Association of Moscow Private Russian Opera. In 1901, after graduating from the Moscow Conservatory with a small silver medal, he first continued to work there, until 1904, simultaneously with 1903 speaking in concerts of the Mug of Russian music lovers with the performance of romances, and then (1904–1911) he entered the Zimin Opera. Worked on provincial scenes. He was a director at the Sofia Folk Opera, later taught.

Worked on provincial scenes. He was a director at the Sofia Folk Opera, later taught.

Centuries worked in the movies. Among his roles — The Duel in story of Kuprin, Miroslav in Martha-Posadnitsa and boyar Nagoy in The Death of Ivan the Terrible, where he debuted Yakov Protazanov.
