= Viktor Ostrogorsky =

Russian teacher, writer, and social activist (1840–1902)

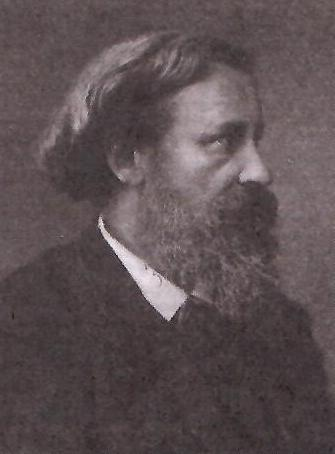
- Viktor Ostrogorsky
- Born: 16 February 1840; Saint Petersburg, Russian Empire
- Died: 31 January 1902 (aged 61); Valday, Novgorod Governorate, Russian Empire
- Occupation(s): writer, pedagogue, publisher

Viktor Petrovich Ostrogorsky Russian: Виктор Петрович Острогорский, (16 February 1840, Saint Petersburg, Imperial Russia — 31 January 1902, Valday, Novgorod Governorate, Imperial Russia was a Russian writer, pedagogue, publisher, translator and social activist.

== Career ==
A Saint Petersburg University alumnus, Ostrogorsky taught Russian language and literature in numerous schools and institutes, including the Saint Petersburg Institute of Performing Arts. As a publisher, he's made himself a name by launching the series of cheap, accessible books for the poor, including From the People's Life (Из народного быта, an 1883 collection of short stories, folk tales, songs and sayings), Good People (Хорошие люди, 1884) and Natalya Borisovna Dolgorukaya (1891). Several of his short dramas formed the 1891 collection From Distant Past (Из дальнего прошлого, 1891).

Described as the follower of Konstantin Ushinsky, Nikolay Pirogov and Vladimir Stoyunin, Ostrogorsky contributed regularly to the pedagogical publications like Uchitel (Teacher), Zhenskoye Obrazovanye (Women's Education) and Obrazovanye. In 1877-1884 he edited Pedagogichesky Listok (Pedagogical Paper), Detskoye Chtenye (Children's Reading) and later (in 1892-1901) Mir Bozhy.

Ostrogorsky translated into Russian Le Bourgeois gentilhomme by Molière and authored numerous popular essays on Russian writers, as well as a book of memoirs How I Became a Teacher (Из истории моего учительства. Как я сделался учителем, 1895).
