= In the Dark (novel) =

1893 novel by Alexander Kuprin

- Author: Alexander Kuprin
- Original title: Впотьмах
- Language: Russian
- Genre: Psychological drama
- Publisher: Russkoye Bogatstvo (1893); Khudozhestvennaya Literatura
- Publication date: 1893
- Publication place: Russian Empire
- Media type: Print (hardback & paperback)

In the Dark (Впотьмах, Vpot'makh) is a short novel by Alexander Kuprin originally published in Russkoye Bogatstvo magazine's June and July, 1893, issues. Later the author drastically edited this first version, and in this cut form it appeared in Rodina magazine, 1912, Nos. 32-34, 36-40. Written in the years of Kuprin's military service, In the Dark is considered to be his most important work of that early period.

== Synopsis ==
Traveling by night train, Zinaida Pavlovna is rescued from the unwelcome attentions of a fellow passenger by Alarin, a young engineer whom she falls in love with. In the town she takes up the position of a governess in the household of the rich industrialist Kashperov who determines to possess her. Having learned of Alarin's facing imprisonment for gambling away official funds, Zinaida offer herself to Kashperov for money, so as to repay her beloved one's debt. Admiring her selflessness, Kashperov gives her the money unconditionally. Recognizing nothing but base greed in Alarin's response, Zinaida is filled with contempt for him. She falls ill from nervous shock, and dies. Kashperov kills himself by drinking prussic acid, and Alarin leaves the town a broken man.

== Concept ==
The novel explores the duality of the human nature, its male characters demonstrating their 'dark' as well as noble sides. "As if mirroring the duality revealed in his characters as the tale progresses, Kuprin's narrative technique oscillates between opposite poles... The story's title is a verbal distillation of the circumstances in which the characters find themselves, a life of figurative darkness intensified by the physical twilight that pervades the work," Kuprin scholar Nicolas Luker wrote.

== Assessment ==
According to Luker, "[w]hile Kuprin's first large prose work shares many flaws of "The Last Debut" - melodramatic passages, unnatural situations, and bombastic language - it demonstrates his ability to handle successfully a complex plot with its major and minor characters, varied settings, and dialogues.”
