= The Duel (Kuprin novel) =

1905 novel by Aleksandr Kuprin

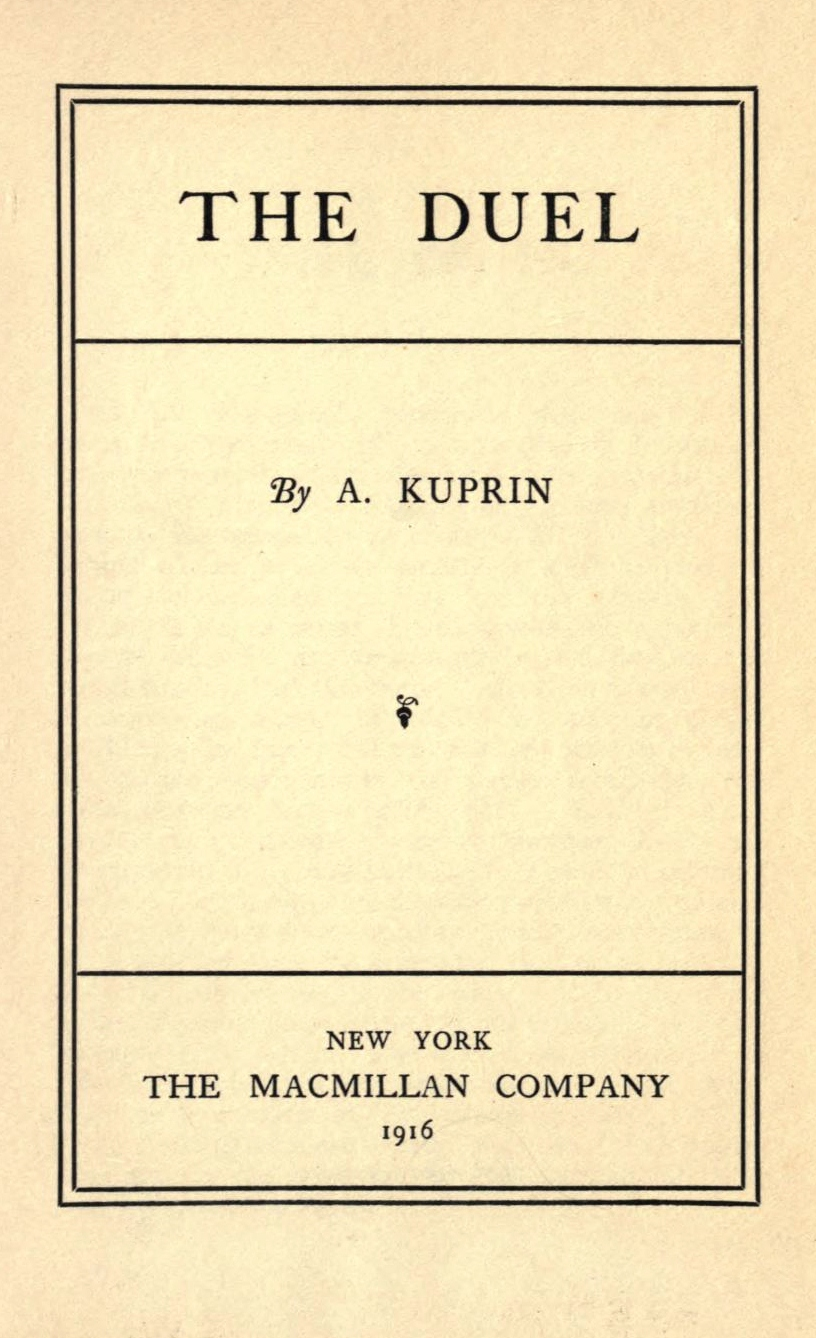
- Title page to the 1916 English translation
- Author: Alexander Kuprin
- Original title: Поединок
- Language: Russian
- Publication date: 1905
- Publication place: Russia
- Media type: Print (hardback & paperback)

The Duel (Russian: Поединок; Poedinok) is a novel by Russian author Aleksandr Kuprin published in 1905. It is generally considered his best work; even though Kuprin's 1896 short story Moloch first made his name known as a writer it was The Duel (1905) which made him famous. Because of it "Kuprin was highly praised by fellow writers including Anton Chekhov, Maxim Gorky, Leonid Andreyev, Nobel Prize-winning Ivan Bunin" and Leo Tolstoy who acclaimed him a true successor to Chekhov.

== Synopsis ==
An intelligent young officer, Second Lieutenant Romashov, is stationed at a dull military garrison in southern Russia where he cannot stomach his sadistic and stupid colleagues and military life. He falls in love with Shurochka (Alexandra), the wife of Nikolaev, a fellow officer and a comrade. She seems kind and compassionate, but in fact is a cold and calculating woman whose one ambition is her husband's advancement. The affair leads in the end to the duel of the title, both externally, and figuratively through the young man's naive dreams of grandeur confronting the degeneration of military life and society of the time. Romashov contemplates forfeiting the duel and leaving the army, but Shurochka talks him out of it, proposing instead that they both shoot in the air. Romashov comes to the duel, and Nikolaev kills him.

== Critical reception ==
The novel was published soon after the end of the Russo-Japanese War – which Russia lost – and many saw it as a political criticism of the Russian military system. Kuprin considered himself a realist and uninterested in politics, but the timing of the work and Kuprin's own experience in the military – he served seven years as an Army Lieutenant starting in 1890 – led many to give it special political relevance. Translator Josh Billings (2011) said the novel was partly a "revenge on the rosily-romantic picture of garrison life made popular by the warmongering of the early 1900s."

== Adaptations ==
The novel has been adapted into film and television several times. The silent film The Duel was produced in 1910. The 1957 feature film Duel was directed by noted director Vladimir Petrov with publicity participation by Kuprin's daughter. A later Soviet adaptation to film was made in 1982, called Shurochka, with screenplay and direction by Iosif Kheifits, starring Yelena Finogeyeva, Andrei Nikolayev and Lyudmila Gurchenko. A Russian television adaptation was shown on Russian TV on 1 June 9 and 10, 2014.

== Editions ==
- In Honour's Name (tr. W. F. Harvey), London: Everett & Coy, 1907.
- The Duel (tr. unstated), 1916. Modified version of the 1907 W. F. Harvey translation.
- The Duel and Selected Stories (tr. Andrew R. MacAndrew), Signet, 1961.
- The Duel (tr. Josh Billings), New York: Melville House Publishing, 2011. ISBN 9781935554523
