= Károly Vekov =

Hungarian-Romanian historian (1947–2020)

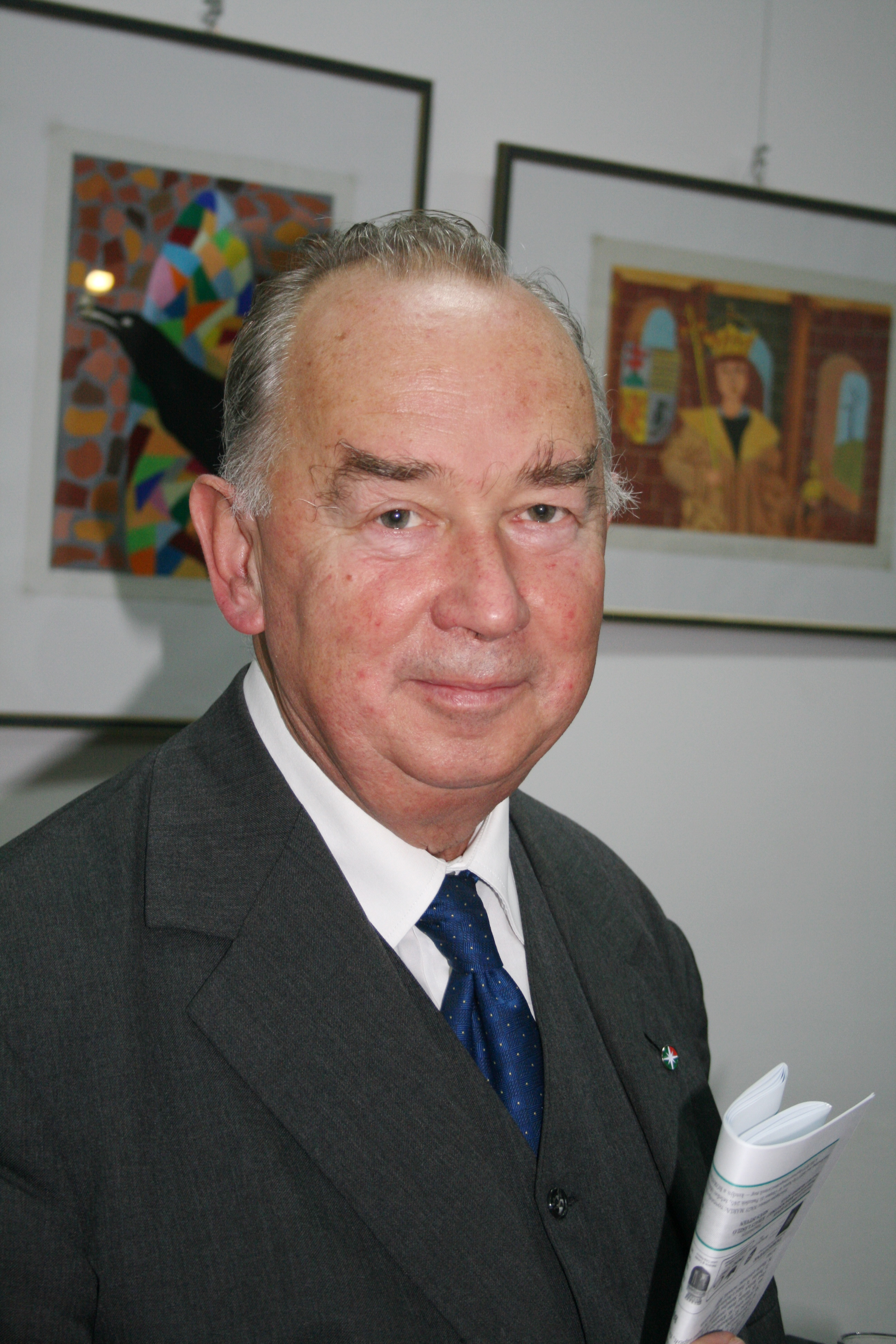
- Image: László Horváth
- Born: 26 September 1947; Budapest, Second Hungarian Republic
- Died: 7 October 2020 (aged 73); Debrecen, Hungary
- Occupations: Historian; Professor

Károly Vekov (26 September 1947 – 7 October 2020) was a Hungarian-Romanian historian and professor. He also served as a politician in Romania as part of the Hungarian community.

== Biography ==
After his secondary studies in Arad, Vekov graduated from Babeș-Bolyai University in Cluj-Napoca in 1971. He worked as a researcher at the Nicolae Iorga Institute of History, working there from 1971 to 1990. A member of Limes Kör, a secret circle of Hungarians in Romania opposed to the Nicolae Ceaușescu regime. He lived in Cluj-Napoca following the Romanian Revolution in 1989 and became a secretary in the national office of the Democratic Alliance of Hungarians in Romania party. He became a secondary school professor at Brassai Sámuel Líceum, then served as director of the Catholic school Római Katolikus Líceum from 1995 to 2000. He served as a municipal councillor in Cluj-Napoca, Regional Councillor of Cluj County, and a member of the Parliament of Romania from 2000 to 2004.

Károly Vekov died in Debrecen on 7 October 2020 at the age of 73.

== Publications ==
- Székely felkelések. 1595–1596 (1978)
- Locul de adeverire din Alba Iulia. Secolele XIII–XVI (2003)
- Structuri juridico-militare şi sociale la secui în evul mediu (2003)
- Istoriografia maghiară din Transilvania în secolul al XVI-lea (2004)
- A gróf emigrált, az író itthon maradt. Wass Albert igazsága (2004)
