= Mir Bozhiy =

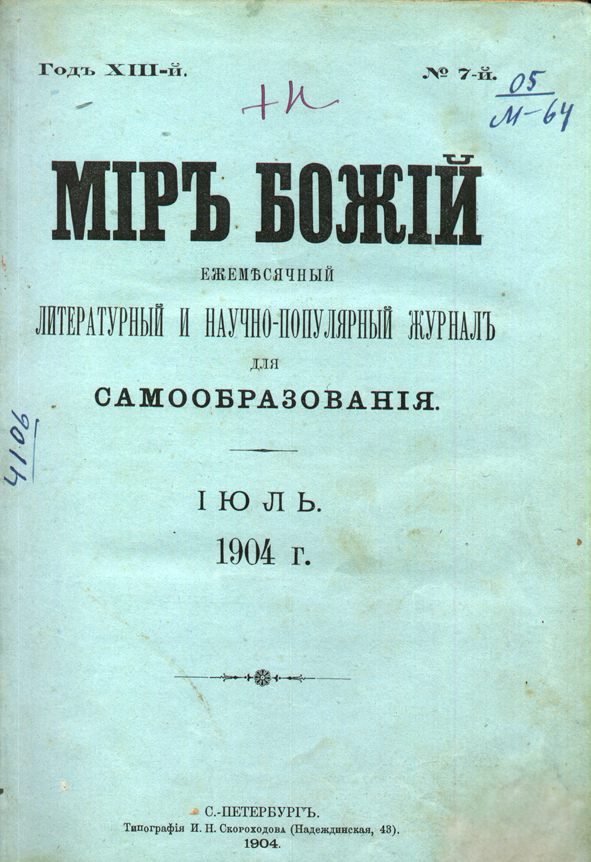
- Cover of Mir Bozhiy
- Editor: Viktor Ostrogorsky; Fyodor Batyushkov
- Frequency: Monthly
- First issue: 1892
- Final issue: 1906
- Based in: Saint Petersburg, Russian Empire
- Language: Russian

Mir Bozhiy (God's World, Мир божий) was a Russian monthly magazine published in Saint Petersburg in 1892–1906. It was edited first by Viktor Ostrogorsky (1892–1901), then by Fyodor Batyushkov (1902–1906). In July 1906 Mir Bozhiy was closed by censors. The publisher of the magazine was Alexandra Davydova, mother-in-law of Alexander Kuprin.

== History ==
The publication's original intention was to promote self-education by popularizing science and history. By mid-1890, due largely to Angel Bogdanovich (who instigated on the journal's pages a well-publicized polemic with narodniks), it became more politically aware. Attracting Marxist (mainly the so-called Legal Marxists: Pyotr Struve, Mikhail Tugan-Baranovsky, Nikolai Berdyaev and others) authors and readership, it became popular among liberal and radical Russian intelligentsia.

The literary criticism section was edited by Bogdanovich, Vladimir Kranikhfeld and Nevedomsky. Among the magazine's regular contributors were Vikenty Veresaev, Leonid Andreev, Ivan Bunin, Alexander Kuprin, Mikhail Artsybashev, Dmitry Mamin-Sibiryak, Ignaty Potapenko, Nikolai Garin-Mikhailovsky (fiction); Ivan Ivanov, Pavel Milyukov, Yevgeny Tarle, Fyodor Batyushkov, Evgeny Anichkov, Nestor Kotlyarevsky (non-fiction).

In July 1906, the journal was closed by censors. It changed its title and in October 1906, re-emerged as Sovremenny Mir (Modern World) with Bogdanovich at the helm.
