= Fyodor Batyushkov =

Fyodor Dmitrievich Batyushkov
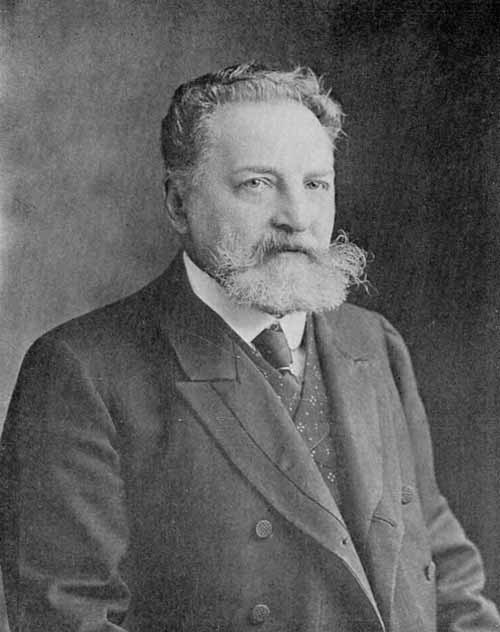
- Fyodor Batyushkov in 1900s
- Born: Фёдор Дмитриевич Батюшков; September 7, 1857; Kosma, Tver Governorate, Russian Empire
- Died: March 19, 1920 (aged 62); Petrograd, Soviet Russia
- Burial place: Nikolskoe Cemetery, Alexander Nevsky Lavra
- Occupations: critic philologist editor
- Years active: 1980s – 1920

Fyodor Dmitrievich Batyushkov (Фёдор Дмитриевич Батюшков, September 7 [o.s. August 26], 1857, Kosma village, Tver Governorate, Russian Empire – March 19, 1920, Petrograd, Soviet Russia) was a Russian philologist, editor (Kosmopolis, 1897–1898; Mir Bozhy, 1902–1906), literary critic, theatre and literary historian.

== Biography ==
Fyodor Batyushkov was born in Tver Governorate, to a noble Russian family. He was a distant relative (great-nephew) of Konstantin Batyushkov, a renowned early 19th-century poet. His father Dmitry Batyushkov was a governor in Grodno.

Having graduated the 1st Gymnasium in Kazan, Fyodor Batyushkov enrolled into the Saint Petersburg University and joined its history and philology faculty which he graduated in 1880. Several years later, after a trip abroad, he became the Petersburg University professor.

In 1890s Batyushkov contributed regularly to Vestnik Evropy, Zhurnal Dlya Vsekh, Novaya Zhyzn, Vseobshchy Zhurnal, later to Rech newspaper. In 1897–1898 he was an editor of Kosmopolis (Russian section), then joined Mir Bozhy of which he was a head in 1902–1906. Mir Bozhy was closed after the publication of a Vyborg proclamation ("To the people from the People's representatives") and there was a case opened against Batyushkov in court.

One of the leading literary critics of his times, Batyshkov reviewed works by all the prominent Russian authors of the time: Leonid Andreev, Maxim Gorky, Alexander Kuprin, Ivan Bunin, Konstantin Balmont, Valery Bryusov among many others. He was regularly corresponding with Kuprin (his close friend), Gorky, Chekhov, Repin and Korolenko.

A French and Italian literature scholar, Batyushkov, wrote numerous treatises and essays (on Jean Racine, Victor Hugo, Middle Age European authors), and was an editor and co-author of The History of the Western Literature in 3 volumes (1912–1914). A biographer of prominent Russian dramatists (Lev Tolstoy, Maxim Gorky, Anton Chekhov among others), Batyushkov regularly reviewed theatre productions and in 1917 became a head of the Saint Petersburg State Theatres committee before being fired by Lunacharsky.

He died in 1920 in poverty and was buried at the Nikolskoe Cemetery of the Alexander Nevsky Lavra.
