= Aleksandr I. Kuprin =

Russian author (1870–1938)

Aleksandr Kuprin
- Александр Куприн
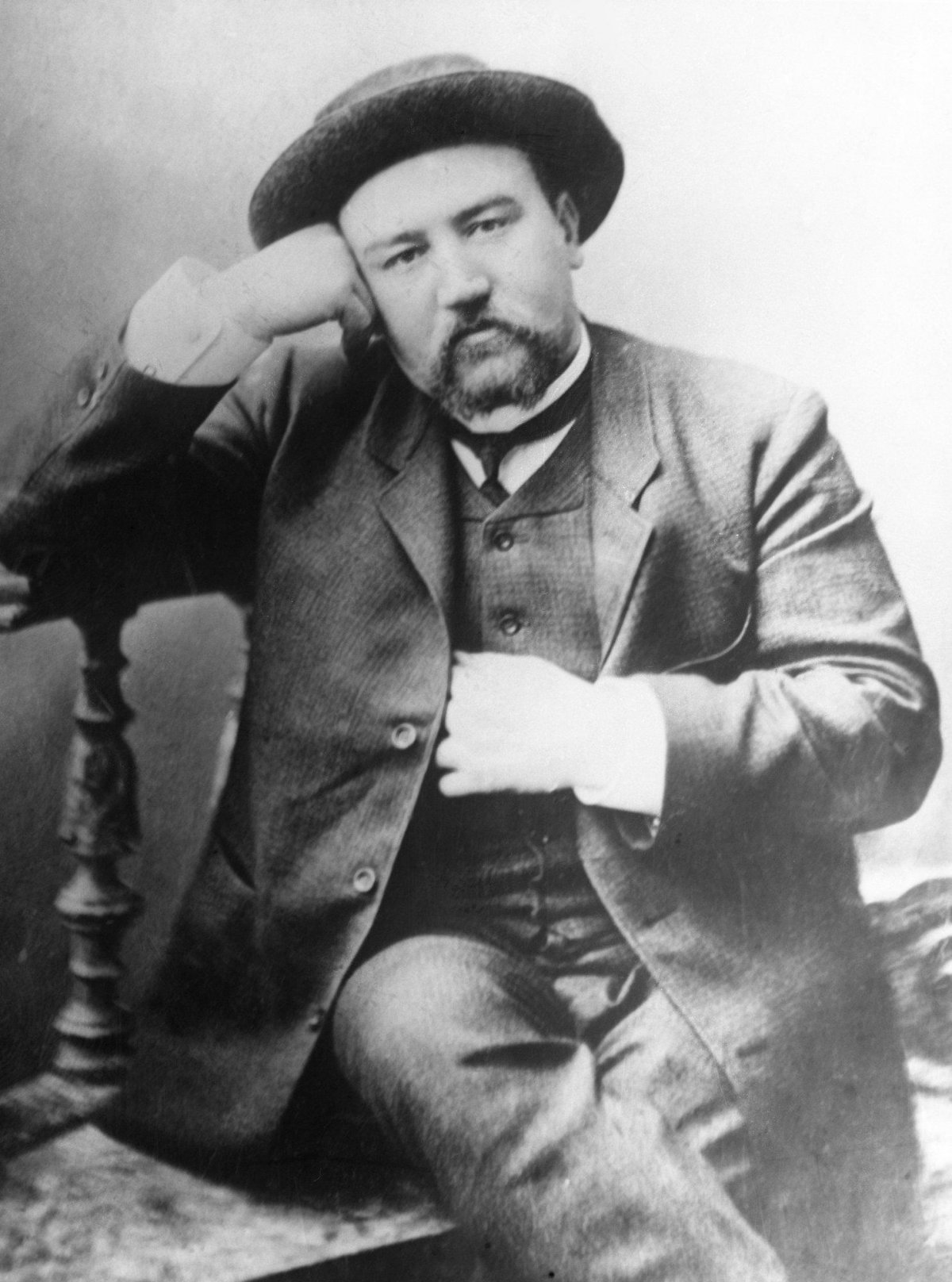
- Kuprin in 1910s
- Born: 7 September [O.S. 26 August] 1870; Narovchat, Penza Governorate, Russian Empire
- Died: 25 August 1938 (aged 67); Leningrad, Russian SFSR, Soviet Union
- Citizenship: Russia
- Occupations: Novelist; short story writer; playwright; journalist
- Spouses: Maria Karlovna Davydova (m. 1902; div. 1907); Yelizaveta Geinrikh (m. 1907)
- Children: 2, including Ksenia
- Writing career
- Notable works: Olesya (1898); The Duel (1905); The Garnet Bracelet (1911); Yama: The Pit (1915)
- Notable awards: Pushkin Prize
- Movement: Naturalism

Aleksandr Ivanovich Kuprin (Russian: Александр Иванович Куприн; 7 September [O.S. 26 August] 1870 – 25 August 1938) was a Russian writer best known for his novels The Duel (1905) and Yama: The Pit (1915), as well as Moloch (1896), Olesya (1898), "Captain Ribnikov" (1906), "Emerald" (1907), and The Garnet Bracelet (1911) – the latter made into a 1965 movie.

== Early life ==
Aleksandr Kuprin was born 1870 in Narovchat, Penza, to Ivan Ivanovich Kuprin, a government official in Penza Governorate. and Liubov Alekseyevna Kuprina, née Kulunchakova. His father was Russian, his mother belonged to a noble Volga Tatar family who had lost most of their wealth during the 19th century. Aleksandr had two older sisters, Sofia (1861–1922) and Zinaida (1863–1934).

In 1871 his father, aged 37, died of cholera. Three years later Aleksandr's mother moved, with young Aleksandr, into the Widows' Home in Kudrino, Moscow, a period reflected in his tale "A White Lie" (1914). In 1876 he entered the Razumovsky boarding school, the source of what he later referred to as 'childhood grievances', but also an environment which nourished his riotous nature and in which he found himself popular among peers as storyteller.

=== Cadet Corps: 1883–1887 ===
In 1880, inspired by Russia's victory in the Russo-Turkish War, Kuprin was enrolled into the Second Moscow Military High School, and turned over to the Cadet Corps in 1882. Several of Kuprin's autobiographical stories, like "At the Turning Point" (1900), "The River of Life" (1906) and "Lenochka" (1910), refer to this period. "The memory of the birching at the Cadet Corps stayed with me for the rest of my life," he wrote not long before his death. Yet it was there that he develop an interest in literature and started to write poetry.

Most of Kuprun's thirty youthful poems date from 1883 to 1887, the four years when he was in the Cadet Corps. Kuprin also made several translations of foreign verse (including Béranger's "Les Hirondelles" and Heine's "Lorelei"). His early political awareness found expression in these works; according to the scholar Nicholas Luker, "perhaps the most interesting of Kuprin's early poems is the political piece "Dreams", written on 14 April 1887, the day before sentence was passed on the terrorists who had plotted to assassinate Alexander III in March of that year." Kuprin was 17 years of age at that date.

=== 46th Dnieper Infantry Regiment: 1888–1894 ===
In the autumn of 1888, Kuprin left the Cadet Corps to enter the Alexander Military Academy in Moscow. In the summer of 1890, he graduated from the Academy ranked sublieutenant and was posted to the 46th Dnieper Infantry Regiment (which he chose at random) stationed in Proskurov (now Khmelnitsky), where he spent the next four years.

== Literary career ==
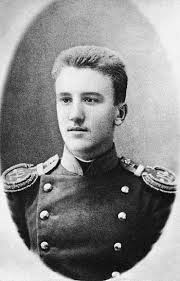
Kuprin in the early 1890s

In 1889 Aleksandr Kuprin met Liodor Palmin, an established poet who arranged for the publication in the Russian Satirical Leaflet of Kuprin's debut short story "The Last Debut", based on a real life incident, the 1881 suicide by poisoning on stage of the singer Yevlalya Kadmina, a scandalous tragedy which had also inspired Ivan Turgenev's tale "Clara Milich".

Three years would pass between the appearance of "The Last Debut" and Kuprin's second publication "Psyche" in December 1892. Like "On a Moonlit Night" which followed, "Psyche" showed the aberrations of a deranged mind, investigating the thin line between fantasy and reality.

Kuprin's years of military service saw the publication of a short novel In the Dark (1893) and several short stories, mostly the artful studies of abnormal states of mind ("A Slav Soul", "Madness" and "The Forgotten Kiss", all 1894). Only "The Inquiry" (1894), his first publication to arouse critical comment, was concerned with the army, starting a series of Russian army-themed short stories: "A Place to Sleep" (1897), "The Night-shift" (1899), "Praporshchik" (1897), and "The Mission" (1901) which finally resulted in his most famous work, The Duel.

Aside from his personal dissatisfaction with army life, the publication of "The Inquiry" was probably the major reason for Kuprin's resignation, in the summer of 1894. "There can be no doubt that the appearance of such a work, written by an officer and signed with his full name, would have had unpleasant consequences for him," Luker argues.

After retiring from the service, without any definite plans for the future, or "any knowledge, academic or practical" (according to "Autobiography"), Kuprin embarked upon a five-year-long trip through the South-West of the Russian Empire. He tried many types of job, including dental care, land surveying, acting, being a circus performer, psalm singer, doctor, hunter, fisher, etc., each of these subsequently reflected in his fictional work. All the while he was engaged in self-education and reading. Gleb Uspensky, with his sketches, became his favorite author.

In summer 1894 Kuprin arrived in Kiev and by September had begun working for local newspapers Kievskoe Slovo ("Kiev Word"), Zhizn i Iskusstvo ("Life and Art"), and later Kievlianin. The qualities necessary for a good journalist, he believed, were "mad courage, audacity, breadth of view, and amazing memory," gifts he considered himself to possess in full measure. While on frequent journeys to Russia's Southwest he contributed to newspapers in Novocherkassk, Rostov-on-Don, Tsaritsyn, Taganrog, and Odessa.

In 1896 Russkoye Bogatstvo published Moloch, Kuprin's first major work, a critique of the rapidly growing Russian capitalism and a reflection of the growing industrial unrest in the country. Since then only twice did he briefly returned to the theme, in "A Muddle" (1897) and "In the Bowels of the Earth" (1899). "On this basis one is tempted to conclude that his concern for the industrial worker in Moloch was little more than a passing phase," Luker opines.

Alongside feuilletons and chronicles, Kuprin wrote small sketches investigating particular environments, or portraying people of specific occupations or circumstances, later gathered into a collection. March 1896 saw the publication of eight such sketches in a small edition entitled Kiev Types, Kuprin's first book. In October 1897 his second collection, Miniatures, came out, with one of his best known circus stories, "Allez!", earning high praise from Leo Tolstoy. In 1905 Kuprin described Miniatures as his "first childish steps along the road of literature". Miniatures, as well as his "Industrial Sketches", made in 1896–1899 after his visit to the Donbass region, definitely marked a further stage in his maturing as a writer.

In 1897 Kuprin traveled to Volhynia to work as an estate manager, then went to the Polesye area in Southern Belorussia, where he helped to grow makhorka. "There I absorbed my most vigorous, noble, extensive, and fruitful impressions... and came to know the Russian language and landscape," he remembered in 1920. Three stories of his unfinished "Polesye Cycle" – "The Backwoods", his much acclaimed love piece Olesya, and "The Werewolf" (a horror story) – were published between 1898 and 1901. Moloch and Olesya did much to help Kuprin build his literary reputation. In September 1901 Viktor Mirolyubov, the editor of Zhurnal Dlya Vsekh, invited Kuprin to join this popular Petersburg monthly, and in December he moved to the capital.

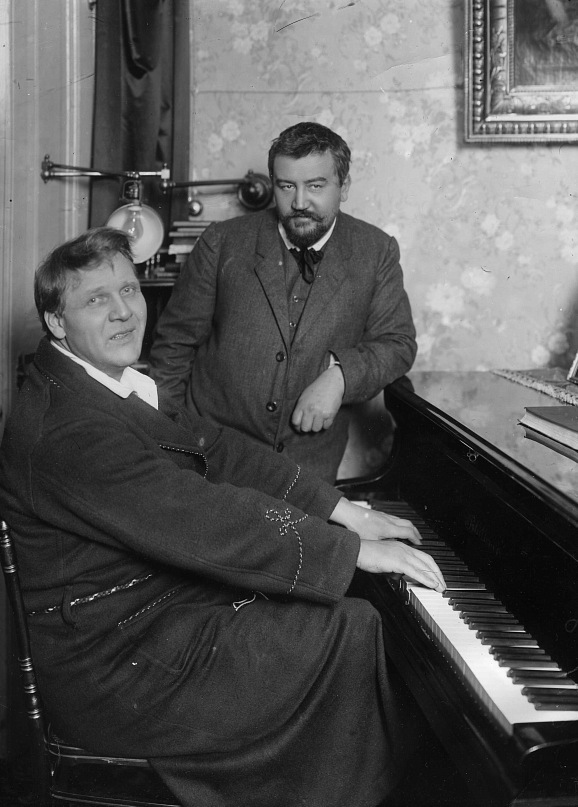
Petersburg, Kuprin (right) with friend, opera singer Fyodor Chaliapin. Photo by K. Bulla (1911)

=== Saint Petersburg: 1901–1904 ===
In Petersburg Kuprin found himself in the center of Russian cultural life. He became friends with Anton Chekhov, whom he regularly corresponded with up until the latter's death in 1904, often seeking his advice. Kuprin's friendship with Ivan Bunin would last almost forty years, continuing in emigration. Another important figure for Kuprin was the scholar and critic Fyodor Batyushkov of Mir Bozhiy. The 150 letters that are extant represent a minor part of their vast correspondence. Later Kuprin expressed much gratitude to Viktor Mirolyubov, who, as well as Maxim Gorky, exerted strong influence upon his career.

In 1901 Kuprin joined the Moscow Sreda (Wednesday) literary society, which was founded in 1899 by Nikolay Teleshov, and united mostly the young realist writers, among whom were Gorky, Bunin, and Leonid Andreyev. In February 1902 Kuprin married Maria Karlovna Davydova, the adopted daughter of Alexandra Davydova, the editor of Mir Bozhy. The latter died that same year. Maria Karlovna took over the publication; and soon Kuprin left Zhurnal Dlya Vsekh, to head the fiction section of the magazine that his wife was now editing.

In February 1903 the Gorky-founded Znanye (Knowledge) published the collection of eight tales by Kuprin, among them "The Enquiry" and Moloch. Leo Tolstoy praised the collection for its vivid language; and critics were almost unanimous in their approbation, pointing to Kuprin's closeness in themes and technique to Chekhov and Gorky. Angel Bogdanovich of Mir Bozhy (who in 1897 had written unflatteringly of Moloch) now praised Kuprin's compact style and his ability to convey a feeling of effervescent joie de vivre. Gorky himself, writing to Teleshov in March 1903, ranked Kuprin a third Russian author, next to Chekhov and Andreyev.

Despite his literary success, Kuprin's first years in Petersburg were stressful. His employment with the magazine left him little time for his own writing; and when his work did appear in Mir Bozhy, rumor had it that he owed his success to his family connections. "Life is hard: scandal, gossip, envy, hatred ... I feel very lonely and sad," he confessed to one of his Kiev friends in a letter.

Kuprin wrote less between 1902 and 1905 than he had in the provinces; but, according to Luker, "if the quantity of his writing was reduced – some twenty tales in all – its quality was incomparably higher... More conscious now of the blatant contrasts prevalent in Russian society, he turned his attention to the plight of the 'little man' - thus following the best traditions of Russian literature." Among the noticeable stories were "At the Circus" (1902) praised by Chekhov and Tolstoy, "The Swamp" (1902), linked thematically with the Polesye cycle, and "The Jewess" (1904), demonstrating Kuprin's profound sympathy for this persecuted minority in Russian society at a time when pogroms were regular occurrences in the Russian South West. Other themes of Kuprin's prose of this period include hypocrisy ("A Quiet Life", 1904; "Good Company", 1905), bigotry ("Measles", 1904), and the degeneration of the idle class ("The High Priest", 1905).

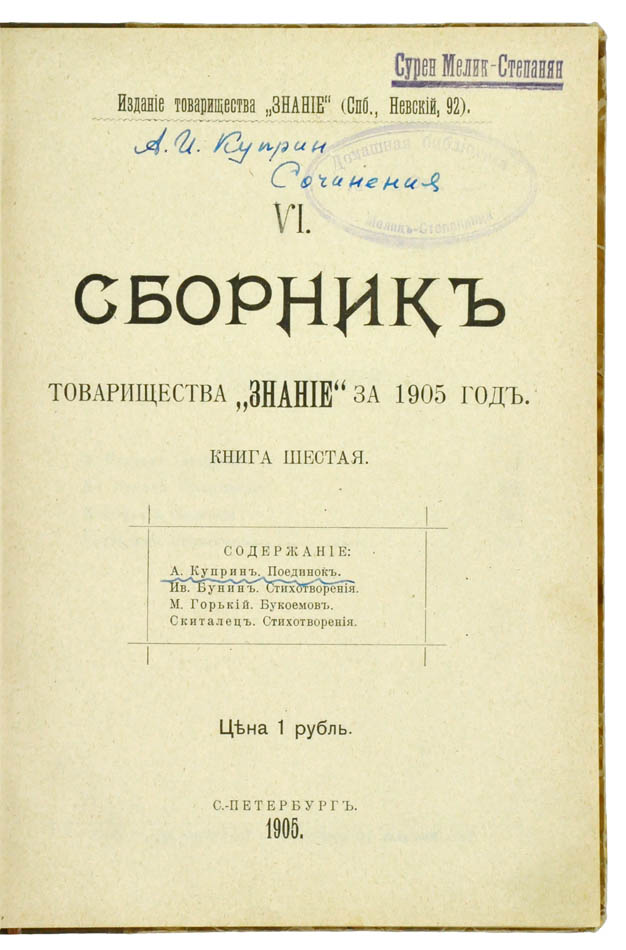
Aleksander I. Kuprin, The Duel, Frontispiece (1905), 1st edition, Saint Petersburg, Russia

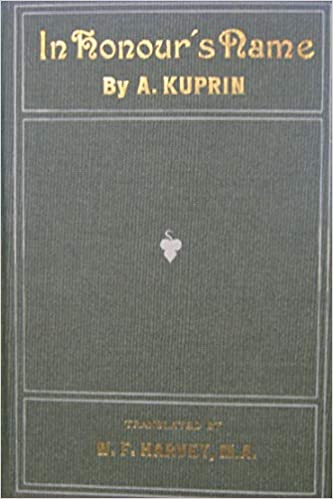
Aleksandr I. Kuprin's In Honour's Name [The Duel] (1907), 1st edition in English, London, trans. W. F. Harvey

=== The Duel (1905) ===
In 1904 Kuprin started working on The Duel. This novel, conceived in his second year in the army, and commenting on the "horror and tedium of army life," was published on 3 May 1905. The creation of this novel was a cathartic experience for Kuprin. "I must free myself from the heavy burden of impressions accumulated by my years of military service. I will call this novel The Duel, because it will be my duel ... with the tsarist army. The army cripples the soul, destroys all a man's finest impulses, and debases human dignity... I have to write about all I have known and seen. And with my novel I shall challenge the tsarist army to a duel," he informed his wife in a letter.

The Duel became the literary sensation of the year in Russia. In 1905 some 45.5 thousand copies were sold, a vast number for the early 1900s. The controversy this novel caused continued until 1917. Critics on the left welcomed The Duel as "another nail in the coffin of autocracy," while their conservative counterparts condemned it as a "perfidious assault on the ruling order." One officer even challenged Kuprin to a duel through a Petersburg paper, while a group of twenty officers sent Kuprin a letter in 1905, expressing their gratitude. The Duel, according to Luker, marked "the summit of Kuprin's career... assuring him immortality in the annals of Russian literature." The first edition in English, translated by W. F. Harvey, was published in London in 1907.

==== 1905 Revolution & aftermath: 1905–1913 ====
After the 1905 Revolution Kuprin became openly critical of the regime. He established links with sailors of the Black Sea Fleet in Sevastopol, and even attempted to enlist on the battleship Potemkin, which mutinied in June 1905. Regarded as politically unreliable, he was put under secret police surveillance. In "Events in Sevastopol" he described the destruction of the cruiser Ochakov, which Kuprin witnessed in Balaklava. His later tale "The Caterpillar" (1918) reveals that he helped to rescue several sailors who escaped from the blazing cruiser. The Black Sea Fleet commander, Admiral Grigory Chukhnin, generally seen as responsible for the tragedy, ordered Kuprin to leave Sevastopol within 48 hours, and instituted legal proceedings for defamation. In June 1906 Chukhnin was assassinated; but the case was not closed; and two years later in Zhitomir Kuprin was sentenced to a fine and ten days' house arrest.

Among his better known stories of the mid-1900s were "Dreams", "The Toast", "Art", and "The Murderer", the latter taking up the issue of violence that swept over Russia at the time. "Junior Captain Rybnikov" (1906), which told the tale of a Japanese spy posing as a Russian officer, was praised by Gorky. Much discussed were "An Insult" (1906) - and "Gambrinus" (1907), an emotional summation of many motifs of his writing after 1905, echoing the declamatory tone of "Events in Sevastopol", according to Luker.

From 1905 onwards, Kuprin again became engaged in numerous non-literary fields. He put himself forward as an elector to the first State Duma for the city of Petersburg. In 1909–1910 he made an air balloon flight with a renowned sportsman, Sergey Utochkin, then ventured into the Black Sea depths as a diver, and accompanied the airman Ivan Zaikin in his airplane trips. In 1907 he divorced his first wife - and married Yelizaveta Geinrikh (1882–1943), who in 1908 gave birth to their daughter Ksenia Kuprina.

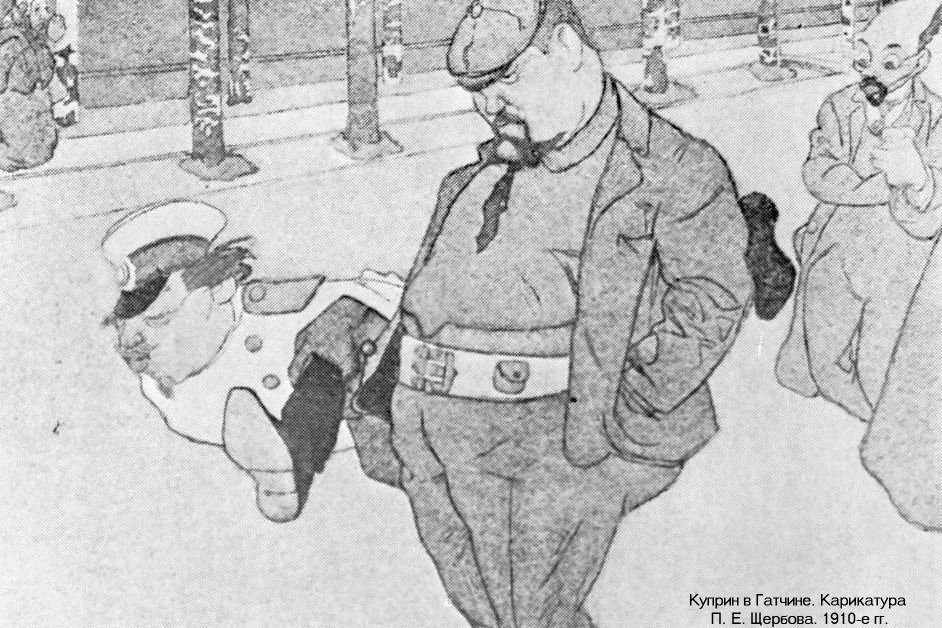
Kuprin in Gatchina (cartoon from the 1910s)

In 1908, Kuprin's relationship with Gorky deteriorated, and he quit Znanye. The same year saw the publication of "Seasickness", a short story telling of the rape of a Social Democrat heroine - and showing her revolutionary husband in an unfavorable light, which Gorky regarded as a deliberate slur on the Russian Socialists. Among Kuprin's other works of the period are "Emerald" (1907), the most famous of his animal stories, "Sulamith" (1908), an ode to 'eternal love', closely based on The Song of Songs, the autobiographical "Lenochka" (1910), and The Garnet Bracelet (1911), his famous 'doomed romanticism' novella, where hopeless love finds its quietly tragic apotheosis. The Lestrigons (1907–1911), a set of sketches on the fishermen of Balaklava, provided a lyrical paean to the simple life and an epic glorification of the virtues of its simple folk. In October 1909 Kuprin and Bunin were jointly awarded the Pushkin Prize.

=== The Pit (1909) ===
In 1908 Kuprin started working on The Pit, his most ambitious and controversial work. The first part of this novelistic study of prostitution appeared in 1909, the second in 1914, and the third in 1915. Part I, as it came out, provoked widespread controversy; parts II and III were met with almost universal indifference. Kuprin, who could not decide, apparently, whether his novel should be a documentary or fiction, either oscillated between the two or attempted to combine them in an artificial way. "He is more successful when in documentary vein, and so Part I, with its details of life in the brothel, is by far the best," argues Luker. The novel was criticized by some Russian critics and authors (Leo Tolstoy among them) for excessive naturalism; among those who admired it was the young Nina Berberova.

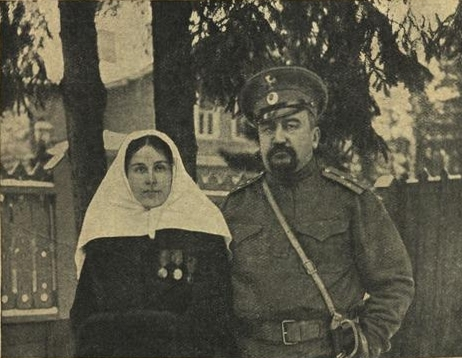
Kuprin and his wife during World War I

The Pit was Kuprin's last major work, and to many it signaled the decline of his creativity. His best-known 1912–1914 stories are "Black Lightning" and "Anathema", while his visit to the South of France between April and July 1912 gave rise to "The Cote d'Azur", the twenty sketches forming a cycle of travel impressions. In 1911 he moved his family to Gatchina, near Saint Petersburg.

As World War I broke out, Kuprin opened a military hospital in his Gatchina home, then visited towns on the Western front. Towards the end of 1914 he appealed through the press for money for the wounded, and in December rejected the idea of celebrating the 25th anniversary of his literary career. As a reserve officer he was called up in November 1914, and commanded an infantry company in Finland till May 1915, when he was discharged on grounds of ill health. That was the reason why he could not become a war correspondent, a career he aspired to during the Russo-Japanese War of 1904–1905. Among his few stories that reflected the war, most notable were his satires ("Goga Veselov", "The Cantaloups", "Daddy", "Grunya"), taking a swipe at the cynics who were making fortunes upon the nation's grievances.

The February Revolution found Kuprin in Helsinki, where he had gone on medical advice. Returning to Gatchina, he expressed his enthusiasm at the collapse of tsarism in a series of articles, and in May started editing the Socialist Revolutionary Party's newspaper Svobodnaia Rossiya (Free Russia), contributing also to Volnost (Freedom) and Petrogradskii Listok (The Petrograd Leaflet). While welcoming the freedom brought by the February Revolution, he foresaw the excesses that further upheaval might bring, and warned against Russia's plunging into an orgy of bloodshed.

The October Revolution did little to clarify Kuprin's political position. In the articles he contributed to various papers till mid-1918 – Petrogradskoe Ekho (Petrograd Echo), Vecherneye Slovo (Evening Word), and Zaria (Dawn) among them – his attitude to the new regime remained ambivalent. He recognized the historical significance of the Bolshevik Revolution, and admired Lenin as "an honest and courageous man," stating that "Bolshevism constitutes a great, pure, disinterested doctrine, that is inevitable for mankind." Still, while working for a brief time with Maxim Gorky at the World Literature publishing company, he criticized prodrazverstka and the policy of War Communism, arguing that the Bolsheviks threatened Russian culture, and that their insufficient knowledge of the country had brought suffering to peasants. In June 1918 Kuprin was arrested for a short time for an article in the paper Molva (Rumor) critical of the regime. One of his 1918 stories ("The Caterpillar") praised the heroism of women revolutionaries, another ("The Ghost of Gatchina") was an anti-Bolshevik tale of the tyranny of Russia's new masters.

At the end of 1918 Kuprin drew up elaborate plans for Zemlia (Land), a paper designed especially for the peasantry. His proposed program involved assisting the government in the radical transformation of rural life, along lines not conflicting with the principles of communism. Supported by Gorky and approved by Lenin, who met Kuprin on 25 December 1918, the project remained unrealized.

== Years in emigration ==
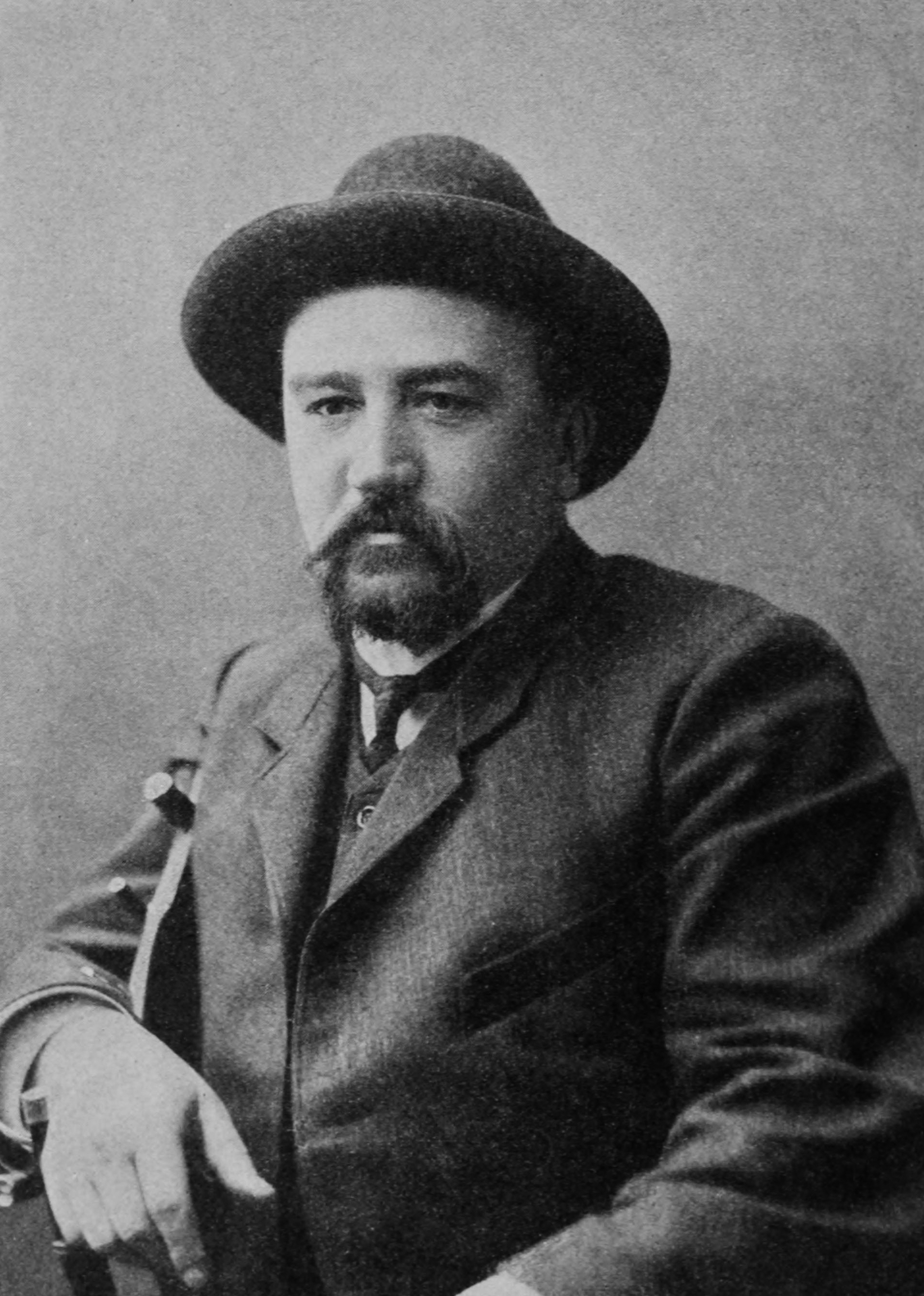
Kuprin in the 1910s

On 16 October 1919 Gatchina was taken by the White Army, led by General Nikolai Yudenich. For a fortnight Kuprin was editing Prinevsky Krai (Neva Country), a paper published by Yudenich's army headquarters. In October, as the Whites retreated westward, Kuprin traveled with them to Yamburg, where he joined his wife and daughter. Via Narva the family reached Revel in Estonia, and in December left for Finland. After half a year in Helsinki, they sailed for France, arriving in Paris in early July 1920.

The next seventeen years in Paris saw the decline of Kuprin's creativity and his succumbing to alcoholism. Grieved at his separation from Russia, he became lonely and withdrawn. The family's poverty made the situation worse. "I am left naked ... and destitute as a homeless old dog," Kuprin wrote to Ivan Zaikin, an old friend. All this combined to hinder his writing. "The more talented a man is, the harder is for him life without Russia," Kuprin told a reporter in 1925.

Kuprin's nostalgia explains the retrospective quality of his work after he had emigrated. He returned to familiar themes from his earlier writing - and dwelled on personal experiences, linking him with the homeland he had lost. His visit to southwest France in 1925 inspired "Crimson Blood" (1926), a colorful account of a bullfight in Bayonne, followed in 1927 by "The Blessed South", four sketches on Gascony and the Hautes-Pyrénées. Then came the predominantly urban sketches made in Yugoslavia, the result of Kuprin's visit to Belgrade in 1928, to attend a conference of Russian writers who had also emigrated. The three major works of Kuprin's Parisian years were The Wheel of Time (13 sketches styled as a novel, 1929), the autobiographical The Junkers (1932), and the romantic "Jeannette" (1933), describing an elderly professor's affection for a little girl in his neighborhood.

== Return to Russia and death ==
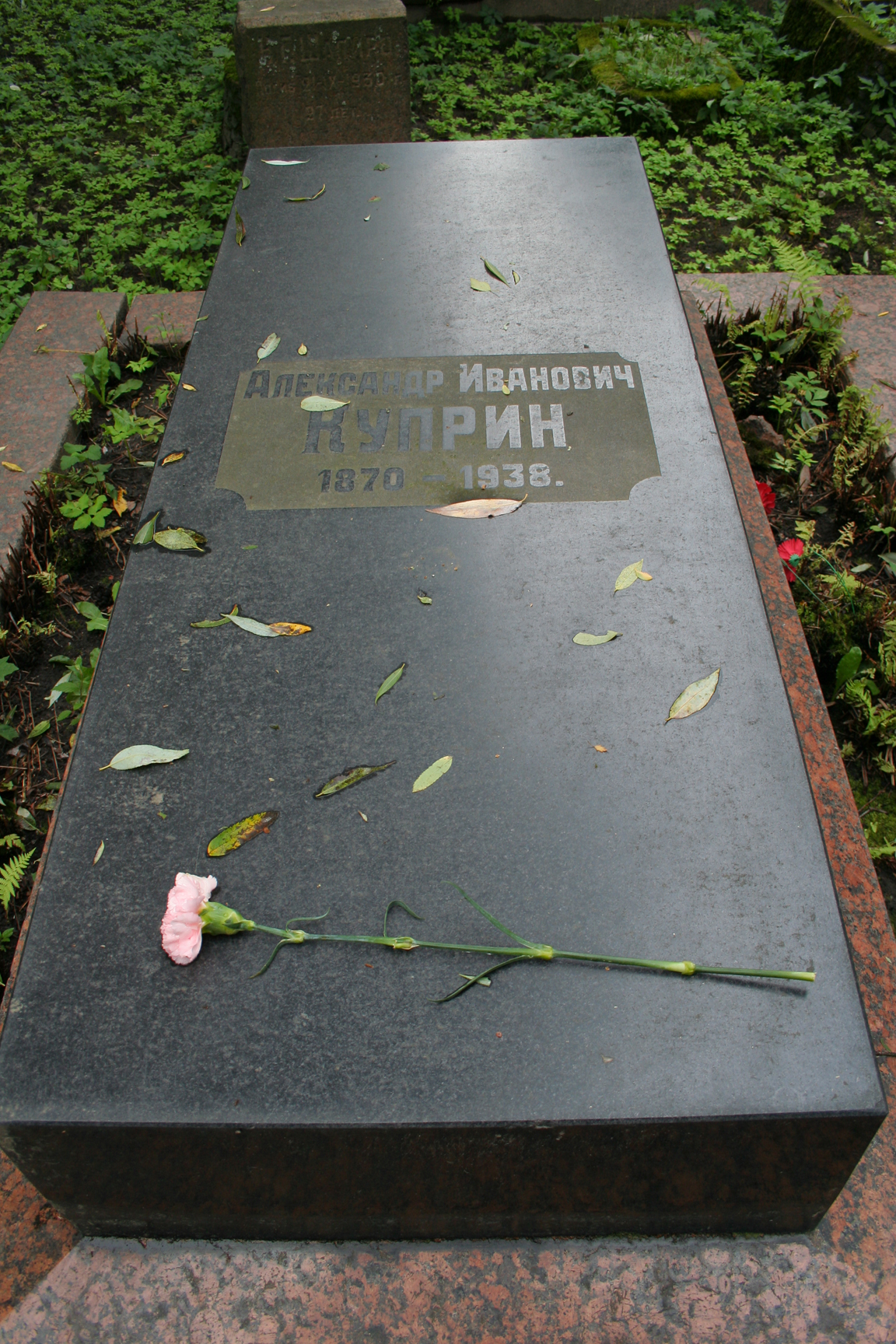
Alexander Kuprin's grave

By 1930 Kuprin's family was in poverty and debt. His literary fees were meager; heavy drinking dogged his Parisian years; after 1932 his sight began to deteriorate; and his handwriting became impaired. His wife's attempts to establish a book-binding shop and a library for émigrés were financial disasters. A return to the Soviet Union offered the only solution to Kuprin's material and psychological difficulties. In late 1936 he finally decided to apply for a visa. On 29 May 1937, seen off only by their daughter, the Kuprins left the Gare du Nord for Moscow. On 31 May they were met there by representatives of writers' organizations, and installed in the Metropole Hotel. In early June they moved to a dacha, owned by the Soviet Union of Writers, at Golitsyno, outside Moscow, where Kuprin received medical attention, and rested till the winter. In mid-December he and his wife moved to an apartment in Leningrad.

The years in Paris had broken his health, and transformed him into an old man. The tragic change was noticed by the writer Nikolay Teleshov, his friend of the early 1900s. Visiting Kuprin shortly after his arrival, Teleshov found him confused, rambling, and pathetic. "He left Russia ... physically very robust and strong," he wrote later, "but returned an emaciated, ... feeble, weak-willed invalid. This was no longer Kuprin – that man of outstanding talent; it was something ... weak, sad, and visibly dying." Later Bunin insisted that Kuprin's role was purely passive: "He did not go to Russia – he was taken there, very ill, already in his second childhood," he wrote.

Kuprin's return earned publication of his works within the Soviet Union, but he wrote practically nothing new after that. In June 1937, to mark the first anniversary of Gorky's death in June, Izvestiya published Kuprin's "Fragments of Memoirs". In October the sketch "My Native Moscow" came out. Memoirs about Kuprin's last days, published in the Soviet Union, give us a picture of a man, happy with his return to his native country. On the other hand, in her account of Kuprin's last months, the writer Lydia Nord painted a picture of a disillusioned old man, who felt he was a stranger in his native country.

In January 1938 Kuprin's health deteriorated. By July his condition was grave. Already suffering from a kidney disorder and sclerosis, he had now developed cancer of the oesophagus. Surgery did little to help. Alexander Kuprin died on 25 August 1938, and was interred in Volkovo Cemetery's Literaturskiye Mostki (Literary Bridge) in Leningrad two days later.

== Private life ==
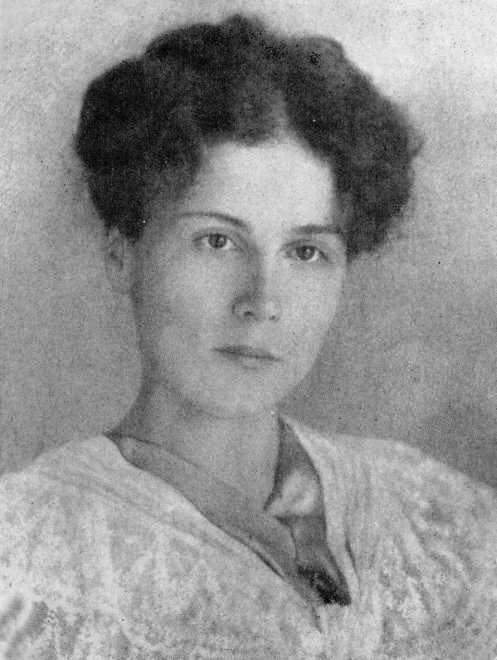
Liza Geinrikh in 1909

In February 1902, Kuprin married Maria Karlovna Davydova (1881—1966), the adopted daughter of Alexandra Davydova, the widow of the Saint Petersburg Conservatory's director who, after her husband's death in 1889, became editor of Mir Bozhy. When she died in 1902, Maria Karlovna took over it and soon Kuprin became the head of the fiction section of his wife's journal. They had one daughter, Lidia (1903–1924).

In the mid-1900s their relationships deteriorated, Kuprin's alcohol abuse being the major reason. On one occasion, outraged by his behavior in the company of drunkards and prostitutes whom he brought to their dacha, Maria Karlovna crashed a decanter over his head. Another incident when, during an ugly row, he tried to set her dress on fire, proved to be their last: in 1907 the couple divorced. Maria Davydova later married the Soviet diplomat Nikolai Iordansky; in 1966 her book of memoirs Years of Youth (Годы молодости, 1966) came out.

Kurpin's second wife was Yelizaveta Geinrikh (1882–1942), a daughter of the Hungarian revolutionary Morits Rotoni-Geinrich, brought up by the family of Dmitry Mamin-Sibiryak, her sister Maria's husband. In the early 1900s she was a sister of mercy, later Lidia's governess and Alexandra Davydova's good friend. In 1907 the couple married and settled in Gatchina. In 1908 their daughter Ksenia was born. Their second daughter Zinaida was born in 1909 and died of pneumonia in 1912. After the Kuprins' return to Russia Yelizaveta Kuprina-Geinrikh devoted herself to compiling and publishing her husband's literary legacy. She committed suicide in 1942, during the Siege of Leningrad.

Ksenia Kuprina (1908–1981) in the late 1920s became a Paul Poiret model and then actress who, as Kissa Kuprine, appeared in 11 films, starting with Le Diable au cœur (1927) by Marcel L'Herbier. After her return to the USSR in 1958, she worked as stage actress, translator, author and scriptwriter. Her book of memoirs My Father Kuprin (Мой отец – Куприн) came out in 1978.

== Legacy ==
According to Nicholas Luker:

Kuprin's position in the history of Russian literature is highly significant, if not unique. Born into an age overshadowed by the great Russian novel, which had reached its zenith in the 1860s. He turned to the short story as the genre suited both to his own restless temperament and to the manifold preoccupations of his generation... With his contemporaries Chekhov, Gorky, and Bunin. he brought the genre of the short story to an efflorescence without parallel in Russian letters. What he conceded in restraint to Chekhov, conviction to Gorky, and subtlety to Bunin, Kuprin made up for in narrative pace, construction of plot, and richness of theme. These latter qualities, coupled with his abiding interest in the human soul, make him still very readable today.

Made famous by his novel The Duel (1905), Kuprin was highly praised by fellow writers including Anton Chekhov, Maxim Gorky, Leonid Andreyev, Nobel Prize-winning Ivan Bunin and Leo Tolstoy who acclaimed him a true successor to Chekhov. Although he lived in an age when writers were carried away by literary experiments, Kuprin did not seek innovation and wrote only about the things he himself had experienced and his heroes are the next generation after Chekhov's pessimists. Vladimir Nabokov styled him "the Russian Kipling" for his stories about pathetic adventure-seekers, who are often "neurotic and vulnerable." All through the 20th century Alexander Kuprin remained "one of the widest read classics in Russian literature," with many films based on his works, partly due to "his vivid stories of the lives of ordinary people and unhappy love, his descriptions of the military and brothels, making him a writer for all times and places."

A minor planet 3618 Kuprin, discovered by Soviet astronomer Nikolai Stepanovich Chernykh in 1979, is named after him.

== Selected works ==
=== Novels ===
- The Duel (Поединок, 1905; translated as The Duel in 1916)
- The Pit (Яма, 1909–1915)
- The Wheel of Time (Колесо времени, 1929)
- Junkers (Юнкера, written 1928–1932, published 1933), autobiographical novel

=== Novellas ===
- In the Dark (Впотьмах, 1893)
- Moloch (Молох, 1896)
- Olesya (Олеся, 1898)
- Sulamith: A Romance of Antiquity (Суламифь, 1908)
- The Garnet Bracelet (Гранатовый браслет, 1911)

=== Short stories and sketches ===
- "The Last Debut" (Последний дебют, 1889)
- "Psyche" (Психея, 1892; translated as "Psyche" in 1929)
- "On a Moonlit Night" (Лунной ночью, 1893)
- "The Inquiry" (Дознание, 1894)
- The Kiev Types (Киевские типы, 1896, a collection of sketches)
- Miniatures (Миниатюры, 1897, short story collection)
- "At the Circus" (В цирке, 1902)
- "The Horse Thieves" (Конокрады, 1903)
- "Captain Ribnikov" (Штабс-капитан Рыбников, 1906)
- "The River of Life" (Река жизни, 1906)
- "The Outrage - A True Story" (unknown)

== Cited sources ==
- Afanasiev, V. N. (1960). Александр Иванович Куприн: Критико – биографический очерк [Alexander Ivanovich Kuprin: Critical biographical sketch]. Художественной литературы.
- Kuprin, A. I. (1964). Собрание сочинений в 9 томах [Collected works in 9 volumes]. Pravda.
