= Russkoye Bogatstvo =

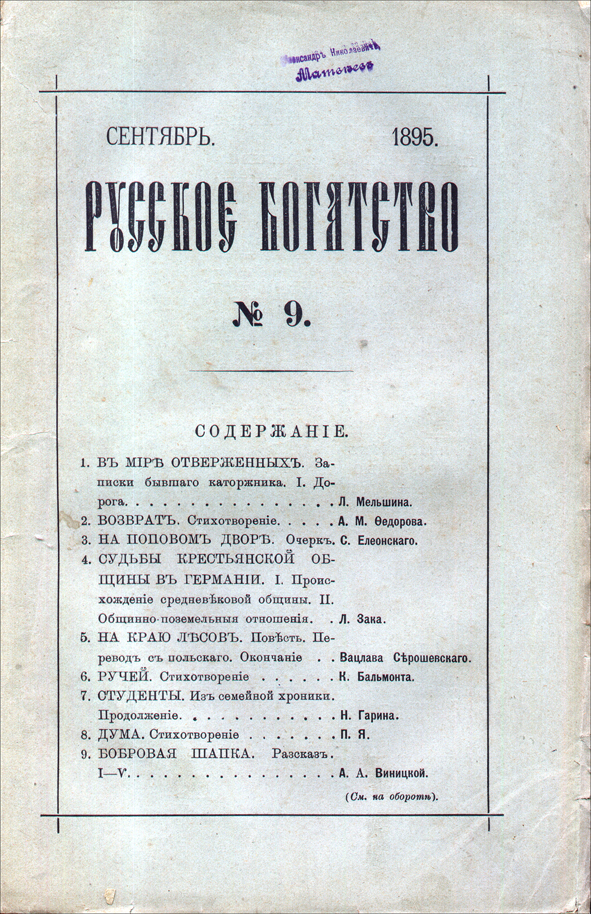
1895 cover of Russkoye Bogatstvo

Russkoye Bogatstvo (Russian: Русское богатство, Russian Wealth) was a monthly literary and political magazine published in St. Petersburg, Russia, from 1876 to mid-1918. In the early 1890s it served as an organ of the liberal Narodniks. From 1906 it became an organ of the Popular Socialists.
