= Trishatny family =

The Trishatny family (Russian: Тришатные; transcribed Trishatnyie) is a Russian noble family, most notable at the end of 19th – beginning of 20th century. Inheritable nobility rights were obtained by Alexander Trishatny, a participant of the Patriotic War of 1812 with Napoleon.

== Genealogy ==
The ancestors of Trishatny (or Treshatny) are said to be of malorossiyan origin (now Ukraine), however this last name is the only evidence here. The inherited land tenures of Trishatnys (it usually affirms hereditary nobility) were registered in Tula Governorate, south to Moscow. Controversial variant of its spelling (Triscshazhny, Russian: Трищажный) upon which amateur researcher Oleg Platonov insists founds no support neither in Russian press of 1900–10s, nor in the mainstream scientific works of both Soviet and international researchers. It also contradicts with known genealogy of Trishatnys family.

Alexander Lvovich; 1785—1852/3
daughter 1 ?—? | daughter 2 ?—? | Constantine; Alexandrovich; 1824/5—after 1848 | Lev; Alexandrovich; 1824/5—? | Iosif; Alexandrovich; 1838 — after 1869 | Zinaida Pavlovna née Gagarina ?—?
Sergei Iosifovich; 1865 — after 1920 | Alexander Iosifovich; 1870 — after 1920 | Constantine Iosifovich after 1870 — September 1918

Alexander Lvovich Trishatny (Russian: Александр Львович Тришатный, 1785–1852 or 1853) participated in the Patriotic War of 1812 with Napoleon, where was three times wounded. After the Battle of Vyazma, which occurred on November 3, 1812, at the beginning of Napoleon's retreat from Moscow was awarded the 4th rank of the Order of St. George. Promoted to lieutenant general in 1837, in 1843 Alexander Lvovich Trishatny assumed the command of the Special Corps of Internal Guard (Russian: Отдельный корпус внутренней стражи). Simultaneously served as an Inspector of Reserve Infantry Corps.

In 1847 general Trishatny was arrested, imprisoned in a fortress and charged "to the connivance to various unpardonable riots in conjunction with actions giving cause to suspect of bribery." Thi case was one of the scandalous incidents of that time, fixed not only in the memoirs of many contemporaries, but in the foreign press. A 17,000-man contingent of conscripts was sent on foot from Moscow to Caucasus into the disposal of the viceroy of the Caucasus prince Mikhail Vorontsov. Colonels and generals responsible for the redeployment of this army-size group completely plundered the money allocated for its food and ammunition by the Reserve Infantry Corps. As a result, 14,000 people is said to have died on the way from hunger and deprivations.

Reports about these abuses reached Nicholas I. However investigation and verification of the reported facts was entrusted to general Trishatny, while the army chiefs who had committed abuses were submitted to him as an Inspector of Reserve Infantry Corps. Trishatny reported the czar that all the complaint was a slander, that the facts presented by complainants were not confirmed, and that all recruits prosper (Russian: благоденствуют).

Meanwhile, another investigator independently sent by czar refuted that, so Trishatny and another general, directly responsible for the operation were immediately arrested and brought to trial. For the abuse of service Trishatny was dismissed and demoted in rank to a common soldier. General Vladimir Poltoratsky (1830–1886) says that Trishatny was also deprived of all state awards and noble dignity, and that his estate was confiscated for the benefit of wronged. However Korf argues that Nicholas I somehow softened the judgment and did not deprive Trishatny of nobility, retained his disability pensions for the injuries and let the choice of the place of residence for him.

Poltoratski mentions only two elder sons of dismissed general, Constantine Alexandrovich and Lev Alexandrovich. As he writes they (apparently, twins) had graduated the Page Corps in 1842 just 3 months before he was accepted there. Born in 1830, Poltoratski himself graduated the "Arakcheyev's" Page Corps in Novgorod in 1848, so alleged twins were 5–6 years older than he was. Born around 1824–25, both brothers served in the Guards Horse Artillery regiment. Their two sisters were ladies-in-waiting at a court of Nicholas I. After the dismissal of their father in 1847, they found themselves on the verge of poverty. Besides, by that time both brothers were already saddled with huge debts; so they decided to cast lots which of them will have to leave Petersburg to reduce the financial burden on their family. The lot fell to Constantine, who went to Caucasus, where Poltoratsky saw him in 1848 in a rank of sotnik. There got acquainted to Leo Tolstoy, who mentions Constantine in his diaries.

Iosif Alexandrovich Trishatny (Russian: Иосиф Александрович Тришатный, 1838 – after 1869) was born when Alexander Lvovich was 53. He also graduated some Page Corps. In 1857 he was seconded to the Caucasian War, where since 1855 truce with Imam Shamil was broken and hostilities resumed. In 1859 a 250,000 strong army of General Baryatinsky successfully completed its pacifying operation, however the further battle way of Iosif Trishatny remains dark.

Iosif Alexandrovich was married to Zinaida Pavlovna, née Gagarina, a granddaughter of Prince Pavel Pavlovich Gagarin (1789–1872). It is not known exactly where their sons Sergei (1865) Alexander (1870) and Constantine (after 1870) were born.

Constantine Iosifovich Trishatny (Russian: Константин Иосифович Тришатный) continued the military traditions of his ancestors and entered the 2nd "Konstantinovskoe" Military School (Russian: 2-е военное Константиновское училище). In service from September, 12 [O.S. August, 31] 1887 what indirectly shows he was born about 1869–70. On its graduation on August, 21 [O.S. 9] 1888 was promoted to the rank of podporuchik and seconded to the 74th "Stavropol" regiment. On August, 22 [O.S. 10] 1889 seconded to the guards unit maintaining the rank of podporuchik (lieutenant). Promoted to poruchik on August, 22 [O.S. 10] 1893, to stabskapitän (May, 18 [O.S. 6] 1900); to captain (May, 18 [O.S. 6] 1900); to colonel (December, 18 [O.S. 6] 1910). As of March 1914 registered with 1st Leib Guard Rifle regiment.

In World War I, on April, 9 [O.S. March, 27] 1915 he assumed command of 54th ("Minsk") Rifle regiment; on January, 22 [O.S. 9] 1916 of a brigade of 37th Infantry division with a promotion to major general (1916). On October, 23 [O.S. 10] 1916 assumed command of the 41st Infantry division. In September 1918 was taken as a hostage by the North-Caucasian Soviet Republic in the provision of a truce. After the violation of the armistice, following the coup of I. L. Sorokin executed in Pyatigorsk together with the other hostages. Awards: Order of Saint Stanislaus 2nd grade (1909); Order of St. Anna 2nd grade (1912).

Sergei Iosifovich Trishatny (19 March [O.S. 7] 1865 – after April 21, 1920). Barrister, a secretary of the board of the Union of Russian People (URP), a loyalist right-wing nationalist party, the most important among Black-Hundredist monarchist and antisemitic political organizations in the Russian Empire of 1905–1917.

Known as the organizer of terroristic combat squads (Russian: боевые дружины) which shot and murdered political opponents of URP, from deputies of Duma to the left-wing functionaries. In 1907–08 following growing internal conflicts and power struggle in the URP Trishatny withdrew from his active participation in the Union.

Alexander Iosifovich Trishatny (1870–after 1920). Graduated engineer, collegiate secretary. Deputy chairman of the board of the Union of Russian People (URP, see above), co-author of the charter of URP.

== Bibliography ==
- "Тришатный, Александр Львович". Большой биографический словарь [Big Biographical Vocabulary] (in Russian). Petersburg: Половцов.
- Волков С.В., ed. (2009). Энциклопедический словарь генералов и адмиралов от Петра I до Николая II [Encyclopedical Dictionary of generals and admirals from Peter I to Nicholas II]. Генералитет Российской империи (in Russian). Moscow: Центрполиграф.
- Leo Tolstoy (1917). The diaries of Leo Tolstoy. Dent, 1917. pp. 88, 269.
- Корф М. А. Записки [Memories of M. A. Korf] (in Russian). Petersburg: Русская Старина. 1900. Февраль. С. 343. Archived from the original on 2012-03-07.
- Никитенко, Александр (1904). Записки и дневник [Nikitenko. A diary] (in Russian). Vol. 1. СПб: М. Лемке.
- Allgemeine geschichte in einzeldarstellungen [General history in a detailed view] (in German). Vol. 4. Petersburg: G. Grote. 1892.
- Полторацкий, В. А. "VI. …Костя Тришатный, история его отца и Павел Полторацкий". Воспоминания [Reminiscences of V. A. Poltoratsky] (in Russian). Petersburg: "Исторический вестник", т. LI.
- "Командиры отдельного корпуса внутренней стражи (ОКВС)". МВД России. Внутренние Войска [Interior Ministry of Russian Federation. Internal Troops. List of commanders] (in Russian).

== See also ==
- Black Hundreds
- Union of Russian People
- Alexander Trishatny
- Sergei Trishatny
