= Ivan Dumbadze =

Russian military general

Ivan Antonovich Dumbadze
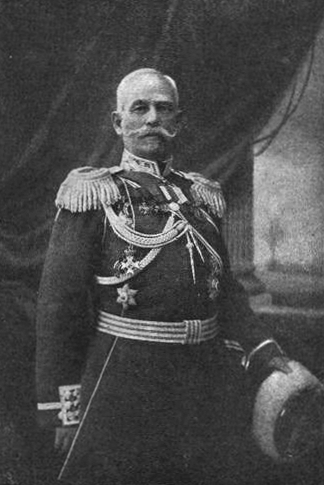
- Ivan Dumbadze ივანე დუმბაძე
- Born: January 19, 1851; Shemokmedi, Guria, Russian Empire
- Died: October 1, 1916 (aged 65); Livadia, Crimea, Russian Empire
- Military career
- Service years: September 30, 1869 — October 1, 1916
- Rank: Major General of H. I. M. Retinue
- Other work: City Head of Yalta

Ivan Antonovich Dumbadze (Russian: Иван Антонович Думбадзе; Georgian: ივანე დუმბაძე) (January 19, 1851 – October 1, 1916) was a Major-General of H. I. M. Retinue of Nicholas II, Supreme Head (Russian: главноначальствующий) of Yalta, one of the activists of the Union of Russian People, notorious for his antisemitic and extravagant escapades.

== Personal life ==
Ivan Dumbadze's father, Anton Dumbadze, came from a commoner family, however, the maiden name of Ivan's mother, Nakashidze (Georgian: ნაკაშიძე), is possibly of a noble Georgian tavadi origin, from the province of Guria (in the 19th century an ujezd of the Kutaisi governorate).

All three brothers of Ivan Dumbadze – Joseph, Nicholas and Samson – also became Major-Generals in the Russian army.

Dumbadze was married three times, and had two daughters and five sons. Alexander Ivanovich Dumbadze, a son from his marriage with Gurieli, was a rittmeister of the Crimean Cavalry regiment, and died January 1, 1918, in a firefight with revolutionary sailors at Sevastopol. Another son, Anton Ivanovich Dumbadze (1887–1948), a Russian Air Force captain, emigrated to France.

== Military career ==
Dumbadze attended the Kutaisi classical gymnasium, after which he entered the Junker Infantry School in Tiflis on September 30, 1869. Upon his graduation on December 20, 1872, Dumbadze was assigned to the 18th "Caucasian" Line battalion as a praporshchik (ensign). In 1875 Dumbadze was transferred to the 162nd "Akhaltsikhe" Infantry regiment, where in 1876 he was promoted to podporuchik (second lieutenant). He took part in the Russo-Turkish War (1877–1878), after which he was promoted to poruchik (lieutenant).

In 1879 Dumbadze was assigned to the office of the military governor, the commander of the military district of Batumi. There he was put in charge of one of the sotnia detachments in a punitive expedition against rebels in the mountainous regions of Georgia. After promotion in 1880 to the next rank of stabskapitan, Dumbadze was assigned to the Guria infantry regiment, to carry out repressions in the province which, considering the noble Gurian origin of his mother, was the land of his ancestors. There in 1882 Dumbadze personally killed two Georgian rebels and wounded himself in that skirmish. For this deed Dumbadze was awarded the Order of St. Anna III Class with Swords and Bow. On August 7, 1882, and was promoted to the rank of captain. Continuing operations against rebels in 1886, he received a head wound and contusion. For this, Dumbadze was awarded the Order of St. Anna II Class with Swords. In total, Dumbadze spent nine years in frontline service against Georgian insurgents.

In 1887 Dumbadze was assigned to the 3rd Caucasus Native Druzhina, in which he was also appointed the chairman of the court-martial of that regiment. In February 26, 1894, while at this rear position, he was promoted to lieutenant colonel, and in 1900 to the full colonel. In this period Dumbadze was close to some Georgian nationalist groups.

On May 26, 1903, Colonel Dumbadze assumed the command of the 16th ("Emperor Alexander III") Infantry Regiment, and remained at this position through October 15, 1907.

== Military and civil head of Yalta ==
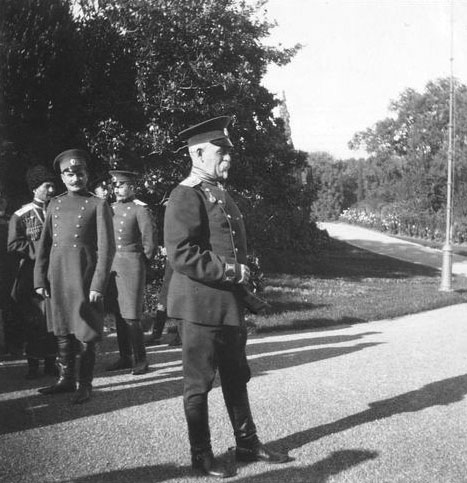
General Dumbadze (c. 1914)

Following increased social unrest in Russia after the October Manifesto of 1905, on October 26, 1906 Minister of Interior Pyotr Stolypin proclaimed a state of emergency in the popular resort city of Yalta. Both civilian executive and legislative powers (zemstvo) were suspended and transferred to General Vassily Novitsky, the Governor of Taurida. Because the governor's residence was in Simferopol, far from Yalta, Novitsky entrusted his rights as the military commandant of Yalta to Colonel Dumbadze, for the protection of the tzar's summer residence in the Livadia neighborhood of Yalta.

Historians defined the policies established at that time by Dumbadze in Yalta and Tolmachyov (a governor in Odessa) the "dictatorship of the Tolmachyov-Dumbadze type". Meanwhile, an independent contemporary encyclopedic biographer of Dumbadze states that he personally performed functions of judicial institutions, making judgments, even "interfering in family quarrels" to resolve them, calling this a "patriarchal" style of government.

A common phrase in Dumbadze's biographies is that he "acted in Yalta quite independently, quickly and decisively, sometimes ignoring existing laws and the opinions of the Senate". His relations with press were also questionable. Although the Russian press was still officially censored, Dumbadze used his own additional means to suppress any criticism. When a newspaper dared to criticize him, Dumbadze immediately deported its correspondent from Crimea. In violation of both the civil laws and the norms of an officer's honor Dumbadze challenged a civilian, a local journalist Pervukhin to a duel, he bragging: "Now I'll get rid of him without a warrant of deportation".

Meanwhile, under the threat of a forced closing of local newspapers or jailing of their editors, Dumbadze required mandatory publication of materials he sent them. He also provided full support to the Black Hundreds (a reactionary anti-semitic movement) and their propaganda. He enforced obligatory reading and wider distribution of their newspapers like Russkoye Znamya and Veche. The scandalous case of Privy Councillor Pyasecki went into the contemporary encyclopedical biography of Dumbadze. Living in retirement, this high-ranked nobleman (III class by the Table of ranks) was the superintendent of a local library in Yalta. Dumbadze ordered him to subscribe to abovenamed black-hundredist newspapers, and after Pyasecki refused, Dumbadze issued him an ultimatum to either join the Union of Russian People or leave the city, and this 72-year-old nobleman was expelled.

Yalta was an elite resort without large factories, and thus no proletariat. So many people whom Dumbadze imprisoned, expelled from Yalta and declared political unreliable were mostly people from the middle class and even nobility.

Dumbadze also admitted to publicly insulting an officer senior in rank to him, as wella as other acts of insubordination, among them insulting the Governor of Taurida, General Vassily Novitsky, who had originally entrusted Dumbadze with the power of supreme military commandant of Yalta. Novitsky acting as the senior official in the region in the absence of Dumbadze, found no legal grounds for Dumbadze's expulsion of some persons, and allowed them to return to the Crimea. As a result of disagreement between them, Novitsky was expelled from the Crimea himself. Another full general whose honor Dumbadze insulted in a public telegram was Vladimir Böckmann, Governor-General of Finland. Again no significant reaction followed either from Nicholas II – who was the Grand Duke of Finland – or from the imperial ministries, and General of Cavalry Böckman was forced to resign. The interference of Dumbadze with the statutory procedures of interaction between the branches of state authorities, shattered the fundamentals of the state rule. Thus even Prime Minister Pyotr Stolypin who is named among supporters of Dumbadze, sometimes was forced to disavow Dumbadze's initiatives, insisting that otherwise the "interaction set by the law between the State Duma and the government could be substantially subverted."

On June 20 [O.S. 7] 1907 Dumbadze insulted the State Duma itself. After its convocation was dissolved, in a telegram to the Union of Russian People (later reprinted in all black-hundredist newspapers) Dumbadze congratulated his confederates with "kicking out that ghoulish Duma" (Russian: поздравляем всех вас с разгоном мерзейшей Думы).

Finally, in 1910 Dumbadze insulted the Governing Senate, the supreme legislative, judicial, and executive body of the Russian Empire, directly subordinated to the emperor. Senate was considering one of his civil cases at that time, and Dumbadze did not pay the stamp fee when he sent his solicitation there. Responding to meeting request from the Senate, he replied in an insulting manner that he "does not know any Senate...", does not want to pay, and "requests the Senate to leave him alone with its illegal demands." The prosecution's case against Dumbadze for the contempt of the Senate failed, after one senator paid the required stamp duty.

== Assassination attempt ==
Dumbadze was receiving death threats from the revolutionary parties, who offered him to resign or be killed. Dumbadze replied to this threats: "I was going to resign and already prepared report, but now I will stay at the active service, and prove that I do not fear any threats. I will devote all my life to the service to Tsar and Russia".

On March 11 [O.S. February 26] 1907 in Chukurlar village near Yalta, a bomb was dropped from the balcony of one dacha near Dumbadze's carriage when it was passing by. By most accounts Dumbadze was not injured; only a visor (peak) of his forage cap was torn off by explosion. Several monarchist publications claim variously that Dumbadze was either "scratched" or "suffered ear damage". In retaliation, Dumbadze called his troops to lay siege to the dacha. Although the bomber immediately shot himself, Dumbadze without any investigation ordered his soldiers to throw out the dacha's inhabitants, not allowing them to take any belongings with them. Soldiers then set fire to the house and did not allow the fire brigade to extinguish it until it had burned to the ground. Wrangel-Rokossovsky says that soldiers destroyed "even the stone foundation of the house." They also broke into and looted a nearby dacha. The official statement of Dumbadze that he'll "destroy every building, from which anybody should shoot or throw a bomb" was similar to preemptive and punitive methods of suppressing the rebel highlander peasants of Georgia. Dumbadze's actions provoked widespread outrage; on April 10 [O.S. March 27] 1908 Alexander Guchkov and other deputies filed III State Duma of the Russian Empire an inquiry concerning unlawful actions of Dumbadze". Owners of demolished houses filed lawsuits against him in the amount of 60 thousand rubles. Trial was inevitable, but Prime Minister Stolypin ordered all claims to be settled, paid as "incidental expenses" of the Ministry of Interior.

== Dumbadze and Black hundreds ==
After the Russian Revolution of 1905 Dumbadze actively participated in the tumultuous events of the political life of Russia. Among the entire spectrum of political movements and parties the greatest sympathy shown by Dumbadze was aimed towards the Black Hundreds.

In the eve of 1907 Christmas, on January 5 [O.S. December 23] 1907 Dumbadze reserved "Rossiya" ("Russia"), one of the best hotels of Yalta, for a congress and a celebration of the "Union of Genuinely Russian people" ("Союз истинно-русских людей"), the extremist nationalist organization. As a head of the city administration, Dumbadze ordered the local police (as the «Russian Word» newspaper noted, „in corpore”, Lat. „in full staff”) and security to ensure the full protection of this gathering. Dumbadze also addressed the mob with a speech.

As soon as "Union of Russian People" (URP), the largest Black Hundredists organization in Russia was instituted, Dumbadze established close ties with them. On September 14 [O.S. 1] 1907 the local organization of URP solemnly presented Dumbadze with a badge of membership. After that Dumbadze consistently patronized URP, providing all kinds of support including administrative pressure while imposing the distribution of their promotional materials.

Antisemitism, a specific feature of URP found deep appreciation and support from Dumbadze. He imposed on the inhabitants of Yalta the obligatory reading of the Black Hundreds' newspapers. Among them «Veche» («Вече») which daily carried a slogan "Get out, Kikes! — Russia is coming!" («Прочь жиды — Русь идёт»), this was replaced on October 16 [O.S. 8] 1908 with "The Kikes must be necessarily deported from Russia" («Жиды должны быть выселены из России обязательно»). These antisemitic appeals, bullying and unequivocal support for pogroms continued in the public life of the city. After a trip to Crimea Pyotr Stolypin told N. A. Khomyakov (the Chairman of the III Duma in 1907-1910) a touching story about their children singing in a choir offensive antisemitic ditties about O. Ya. Pergament — baptized Jew, a lawyer and a mathematician, a deputy of the same Third Duma:

Жид Пергамент
попал в парламент
Сидел бы дома,
ждал погрома.

— From: Кац, А. С.Евреи. Христианство. Россия.
Translation:

Kike Pergament
sneaked into the Parliament,
Should have better sat at home,
waiting for a pogrom.

N. S. Mishchenko, a deputy chairman of the Kiev provincial Department of URP assessed Dumbadze activities within the context of his party in the most laudatory expressions:

Had Russia... two or three more like General Dumbadze, the entire Jewish alien revolution would have been uprooted, and all the judaizing (Russian: "жидовствующие") Russians would have bowed afront the sacred banner of the Union of Russian People.

— Brock, John Joseph., The theory and practice of the Union of the Russian People, 1905-1907

According to American Jewish Year Book, in August 1915 Dumbadze denied having anti-Jewish sentiments

The world notorious fame came to General Dumbadze in 1909 when he provided the concealment of justice to Alexander Dubrovin, a leader of the Union of the Russian People (URP). On July 31 [O.S. 18] 1906 in Terijoki, (now Zelenogorsk) the deputy of the I State Duma, Mikhail Herzenstein was assassinated. Investigators got evidences that the murder was organized by Yushkevich-Kraskovsky, an assistant of Dubrovin. Yushkevich-Kraskovsky worked with the killers directly at the office of URP in Petersburg, where he gave them photos of a targeted victim, money etc.

Russian authorities have actively resisted the investigation and the trial (although being a constituent part of the Russian Empire, the Grand Duchy of Finland was autonomous in its internal affairs and judicial proceedings). So when a Finnish court subpoenaed Dubrovin had to Terioki Dumbadze subpoenaed to testify as a witness, Dumbadze immediately gave him a refuge in his house in Yalta. This house was located on the territory of Livadia Palace, a summer residence of the tzar, guarded by security, headed by Dumbadze himself.

All the attempts to bring Dubrovin to the trial failed. The New York Times wrote on these days:

But Dr. Dubrovin, the head of the criminal organization, is enjoying the sea breezes of Crimea, where he is protected by Governor General Dumbadze, a little distance away from Livadia, where the Czar is now spending his summer.

— Herman Bernstein, The New York Times, September 19, 1909

== Later career and death ==
On May 31, 1907, Dumbadze was promoted to Major General. From October 15, 1907, through July 10, 1908, he was the commander of the 2nd Brigade of the 34th Infantry division, and through July 23, 1912, was listed as the commander of the 2nd Brigade of the 13th Infantry division. On August 2 [O.S. July 20] 1908 he was appointed commander of the 2nd Brigade of the 13th Infantry division, and the Supreme Head of Yalta.

On August 4 [O.S. July 23] 1912, by the order of the Military minister, Dumbadze was dismissed from this position in the Infantry division, and in the same month from the office of the Supreme Head of Yalta; he was seconded to the reserve of the Military minister.

In December 1912, Tzar Nicholas II enlisted Dumbadze in H. I. M. Retinue, and soon, by the personal will of the tzar, Dumbadze was restored at his former position of the Supreme Head of Yalta. At this position Dumbadze received several foreign decorations, including the Persian Order of the Lion and Sun, the Bukhara orders of "Rising Star" and of "Golden Star", the Greek Order of the Saviour and the Montenegrin Order of Prince Daniel.

In August 1914, Dumbadze received a special sign on the St. George's Ribbon for "forty years of irreproachable service". However, by the beginning of World War I he was ill, and was not involved in the conflict, continuing to live in Livadia. In the spring of 1916 Dumbadze underwent surgery in Kiev, which was ineffectual. On August 15, 1916, at his own request, Dumbadze abandoned his position in the Yalta city administration, while remaining the member of the tzar's retinue. On October 1, 1916, he died in Livadia, and was buried with both military and civilian honors.
