= Evgeny Markov (writer) =

Russian writer, critic and ethnographer

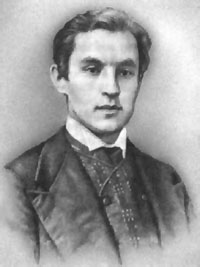
- Born: Марков Евгений Львович; October 8, 1835; Krutoye, Shchigrovsky Uyezd, Kursk Governorate, Russian Empire
- Died: March 30, 1903 (aged 67); Voronezh, Russian Empire
- Occupations: writer, critic, ethnographer

Evgeny Lvovich Markov (Russian: Евге́ний Льво́вич Ма́рков, 8 October 1835, Krutoye, Shchigrovsky Uyezd, Kursk Governorate, Russian Empire, — 30 March 1903, Voronezh, Russian Empire) was a Russian writer, critic and ethnographer.

Originally a liberal author who contributed to Otechestvennye Zapiski, Delo and Vestnik Evropy among other magazines, Evgeny Markov gradually drifted towards the conservative camp, became part of the Slavophile movement and gained notoriety by being arguably the fiercest critic of Nikolai Nekrasov.

Markov's major novel, Black Earth Field (Черноземное поле, 1878), eulogized the simple, close-to-nature life of an idealized, well-cultured Russian landlord. Even more retrograde was his collection of autobiographical notes and sketches Barchuki (Барчуки, 1874), full of nostalgia for 'simple and quiet virtues' of the old Russia's serfdom.

What stood the test of time better was his legacy of traveller sketches, notably the popular Sketches of Crimea (Очерки Крыма, 1872), as well as Sketches of Caucasus (Очерки Кавказа, 1887), Journey to the East (Путешествие на Восток, Vols. 1-2, 1890–1891), Russia in Central Asia (Россия в Средней Азии, 1901) and Journey Through Serbia and Montenegro (Путешествие по Сербии и Черногории, 1903).

His younger son Nikolai Markov, was a Russian politician and publicist, one the leaders of the Black Hundred movement.
