= Sergei Trishatny =

Russian monarchist, politician, high-ranking member of right-wing party

- Born: Тришатный, Сергей Иосифович; 19 March [O.S. 7] 1865; Saint Petersburg, Russian Empire
- Disappeared: 21 April 1920 (aged 55); Petrograd, RSFSR
- Citizenship: Russian Empire, RSFSR
- Style: monarchism, antisemitism
- Political party: Union of Russian People

Sergei Iosifovich Trishatny (19 March [O.S. 7] 1865 — after 21 April 1920) was an elder brother of Alexander Trishatny, with whom he worked in the supreme bodies of the Union of the Russian People (URP), a loyalist right-wing nationalist party, the most important among Black-Hundredist monarchist and antisemitic political organizations in the Russian Empire of 1905–1917. In 1905–1908 he was a secretary of the URP. In January 1920, he was detained and in April 1920, he escaped from a detention camp. After that, all traces of him were lost.

== Biography ==
Sergei Iosifovich Trishatny was born on 19 March [O.S. 7] 1865. Graduated the law faculty of the Saint Petersburg Imperial University. Biographers point at his contacts with Pyotr Rachkovsky, the famous chief of the Okhrana, the secret service of the Russian Empire, an antisemite by devotion. In November 1902 Rachkovsky returned from Paris (supposedly bringing the notoriously known "Protocols of the Elders of Zion" with him) to Petersburg.

When the Russian Revolution of 1905 began, Sergei Trishatny was a barrister. In October 1905, together with his younger brother, Alexander Trishatny, he took part in the organization of the Union of the Russian People (URP) under the leadership of Alexander Dubrovin. When on 8 November [O.S. 26 October] 1905 the founding of the Union of the Russian People was formally announced, Sergei Trishatny was appointed a Secretary, while his brother Alexander Trishatny became the deputy chairman of the Main Board (Russian: Главный Совет) of this union, headed by Dr. Dubrovin.

Sergei Trishatny was named as the organizer of terroristic combat squads (Russian: боевые дружины) which shot and murdered political opponents of the URP, from deputies of the Duma to left-wing functionaries. In 1907–1908, following growing internal conflicts and power struggles in the URP, Trishatny withdrew from his active participation in the Union. From 1908 he worked as legal adviser to the Central Post Office in St. Petersburg.

After the October Revolution of 1917, Trishatny did not emigrate and went to work for the Soviets. In December 1918 he got a job as an auditor of the Food Committee of the Nikolaevskaya railway. A year later, on 20 December 1919, he was detained by the Cheka of Petrograd, which was investigating the URP at that time, as he had once been a member of it. In three weeks, on 12 January 1920 the investigator found no corpus delicti in Trishatny's testimony and released him from detention.

Five days later, on 17 January 1920, the Cheka of Petrograd decided to detain Trishatny "as an ex-member of the URP" upon lifting of martial law in the city. Trishatny worked at a camp in Petrograd until 1 April 1920, when he escaped. On 21 April 1920 the Cheka officially put Trishatny on its wanted list. His ultimate fate is unknown.

== See also ==
- Alexander Dubrovin
- Alexander Trishatny
- Black Hundreds
- List of people who disappeared
- Union of the Russian People

== Sources ==
- Rawson, Don C. (March 1995). Russian rightists and the revolution of 1905. Cambridge Russian, Soviet and Post-Soviet Studies (No. 95). Cambridge University Press. pp. xv, 312, 1 map, 28 tables. ISBN 978-0-521-48386-5.
- Klier J.D., Lambrozo S. (1992). Pogroms: Anti-Jewish Violence in Modern Russian History. Cambridge University Press. p. 415. ISBN 978-0-521-40532-4.
- John D. Klier (2005). "Black Hundreds". Antisemitism: a historical encyclopedia of prejudice and persecution. ответственный: Richard S. Levy. ABC-CLIO. p. 71 of 828. ISBN 1-85109-444-X.
- Rogger, Hans (1986). "Was there a Russian Fascism? The Union of Russian People". Jewish policies and right-wing politics in imperial Russia. University of California Press. p. 289. ISBN 0-520-04596-3.
- Ascher, Abraham (1986). The Revolution of 1905: Authority restored. University of California Press. pp. 240, 276, 285, 358. ISBN 0-520-04596-3.
- Oleg Platonov. "Указатель имён к тому 2 (гл. 57-85)". История русского народа в XX веке (in Russian).
- Степанов, А. "Тришатный Сергей Иосифович". In Oleg Platonov (ed.). Чёрная сотня. Историческая энциклопедия 1900–1917. (in Russian) (Институт русской цивилизации ed.). Moscow, 2008: Крафт+.
