= Definitions of pogrom =

History and meaning of the term

Venn diagram illustrating the overlapping definitions of the word pogrom incorporate the definitional requirements of a massacre, a riot and a group persecution.

This article provides a list of definitions of the term pogrom. The term originated as a loanword from the Russian verb громи́ть (Russian pronunciation: [ɡrɐˈmʲitʲ]), meaning "to destroy, to wreak havoc, to demolish violently". The events in Odessa during Holy Week in 1871 were the first to be widely called a "pogrom" in Russian, and the events of 1881–82 introduced the term into common usage throughout the world.

Numerous definitions of the term have been proposed by scholars and dictionary publishers, but use of the term is inconsistent. Research into pogroms frequently requires consideration of the precise meaning of the word. Werner Bergmann writes that "there is as yet no consensus on terminology here among researchers", that "there has as yet been little interlinked research into pogroms" and that pogrom research has not yet focused on "distinguishing pogroms from other, closely related forms of ethnic violence". A number of other scholars, such as John Klier, Henry Abramson, David Engel, Paul R. Brass and Neal Pease, have discussed the consistency of the application of the term and the implications of its usage.

The term is sometimes used as "a generic term in English for all forms of collective violence directed against Jews"; however, usage of the word exclusively emphasising Jewish harm in this wider sense has been disputed.

== List of definitions ==
According to the Oxford English Dictionary (OED), the word pogrom entered English from Yiddish which borrowed it from Russian. The OED gives two meanings for the word:

In Russia, Poland, and some other East European countries in the late 19th and early 20th centuries: an organized massacre aimed at the destruction or annihilation of a body or class of people, esp. one conducted against Jewish people. Now hist.

and

gen. An organized, officially tolerated, attack on any community or group. Also fig.

The first recorded use in English by the OED of the first meaning is in 1891 as a borrowed word, and it had become fully Anglicised by 1921. The OED records the first use of the second meaning as 1906 and that it had become fully Anglicised by 1975.

=== Other definitions ===
A general dictionary definition may be the one used by academics and other authorities when they describe an incident as a pogrom, or they may either select to use a different definition from a named source, or define the word themselves, to give it a specific meaning:

Definition of pogrom, in chronological order
Date	Author	Definition
1806	Russian Academy	(Russian) destruction in the time of hostile invasion
1920	Henry Morgenthau, Sr.	...the word is applied to everything from petty outrages to premeditated and carefully organized massacres. No fixed definition is generally understood.
1931	Lietuvos aidas	A pogrom is an inhuman, disorderly use of brutal force against other people, citizens of the same state of a different nationality.
1932	Louis Fischer	Experience in Czarist Russia, in post-war Poland and Rumania, and more recently in Palestine, has shown that a pogrom is, by definition violence perpetrated with the active assistance, or at least the connivance of, the authorities
1933	Oxford English Dictionary	an organized massacre in Russia for the destruction or annihilation of any body or class: in the English newspapers ... chiefly applied to those directed against the Jews
1964	Webster's Dictionary	an organized massacre and looting of helpless people, usually with the connivance of officials, specifically, such a massacre of Jews
1995	Mendes-Flohr and Reinharz	In the international lexicon pogrom is now a technical term designating the type of attack carried out by the non-Jewish population of Russia - and Eastern Europe in general - against the Jews between 1881 and 1921. Rarely did the police or the army intervene; indeed, they often lent their support to the rioters
1996	Brass	When it can be proved that the police and the state authorities more broadly are directly implicated in a "riot" in which one community provides the principal or sole victims
1999	Israel Charny	has come to mean specifically the wanton destruction of Russian-Jewish life and property during the years 1881 and 1921, and more generally is available as a word for massacre of any minority group, although it is not often used
1999	Henry Abramson	A pogrom is generally thought of as a cross between a popular riot and a military atrocity, where an unarmed civilian, often urban, population is attacked by either an army unit or peasants from surrounding villages, or a combination of the two... Jews have not been the only group to suffer under this phenomenon, but historically Jews have been frequent victims of such violence. In mainstream usage, the word has come to imply an act of antisemitism.
2001	Donald L. Horowitz	The pogrom is not so much a complementary species of interethnic violence as it is a subcategory of the ethnic riot. If pogrom is taken to mean a massacre of helpless people, then it obviously connotes something about the situation of the targets and the outcome of violence.
2001	Encyclopedia of Nationalism	Mobilized crowd violence (usually officially encouraged) against members of a subordinate cultural group.
2003	Guido Bolaffi	Originally used to describe violent and often murderous anti-Jewish persecutions (the most important of which took place in Kishinev) in Russia following the assassination of Tsar Alexander II in 1881, more recently the term 'pogrom', from the Russian pogrom (total destruction, devastation) has also been used to refer to attacks on other groups.
2003	Macmillan Encyclopedia	An attack on Jews and Jewish property, especially in the Russian Empire. Russian pogroms, which were condoned by the government, were particularly common in the years immediately after the assassination of Alexander II in 1881 and again from 1903 to 1906, though mob persecution of Jews continued until the Russian Revolution (1917).
2004	Avraham Greenbaum	...a serious anti-Jewish riot, usually lasting for more than a day and often abetted by the authorities actively or passively
2004	David Engel	Engel states that although there are no "essential defining characteristics of a pogrom", the majority of the incidents "habitually" described as pogroms "took place in divided societies in which ethnicity or religion (or both) served as significant definers of both social boundaries and social rank, ... involved collective violent applications of force by members of what perpetrators believed to be a higher-ranking ethnic or religious group against members of what they considered a lower-ranking or subaltern group, ... appliers of the decisive force tended to interpret the behaviour of victims according to stereotypes commonly applied to the groups to which they belonged, ... perpetrators expressed some complaint about the victims' group, ...[and] a fundamental lack of confidence on the part of those who purveyed decisive violence in the adequacy of the impersonal rule of law to deliver true justice in the event of a heinous wrong."
2005	John K. Roth	In the history of anti-semitism and Jewish-Christian relations, however, pogrom refers to violent attacks on Jewish persons, communities and properties in any part of the world. Provoked by antisemitic charges that Jews, in one way or another, have acted treacherously against the majority population's national, economic or religious interests, pogroms often appear to be spontaneous, but closer scrutiny shows that they are usually condoned, if not organised, by political leaders and governments
2005	Werner Bergmann	a unilateral, nongovernmental form of collective violence initiated by the majority population against a largely defenseless ethnic group, and occurring when the majority expect the state to provide them with no assistance in overcoming a (perceived) threat from the minority...
2005	Dictionary of the Israeli-Palestinian Conflict	Russian word meaning 'attack' or 'devastation.' Historically, it designates mob attacks accompanied by pillage and murder that were perpetrated against the Jews of Russia—for example, in 1881–1882 and in 1903 at Kishinev. An important component of a pogrom is the usually silent complicity of the police and other authorities."
2007	Encyclopedia Judaica	a Russian word designating an attack, accompanied by destruction, looting of property, murder, and rape, perpetrated by one section of the population against another. In modern Russian history pogroms have been perpetrated against other nations (Armenians, Tatars) or groups of inhabitants (intelligentsia). However, as an international term, the word "pogrom" is employed in many languages to describe specifically the attacks accompanied by looting and bloodshed against the Jews in Russia. The word designates more particularly the attacks carried out by the Christian population against the Jews between 1881 and 1921 while the civil and military authorities remained neutral and occasionally provided their secret or open support.
2008	Samuel Totten and PaulBartrop	A term usually associated with mob attacks against Jewish communities especially in Tsarist Russia before 1917, though embracing numerous additional anti-Jewish persecutions in other countries up to relatively recent times
2011	John Klier	By the twentieth century, the word "pogrom" had become a generic term in English for all forms of collective violence directed against Jews. The term was especially associated with Eastern Europe and the Russian Empire, the scene of the most serious outbreaks of anti-Jewish violence before the Holocaust.
2011	Wiley-Blackwell	Pogroms... were antisemitic disturbances that periodically occurred within the tsarist empire. ... The term pogrom has been applied additionally to the campaign of anti-Jewish violence perpetrated by Nazism...."
2010	David Gaunt, Jonathan Dekel-Chen, Natan Meir, Israel Bartal	What were the Pogroms? Although pogroms could affect any targeted group, in normal usage the word has come to denote an anti-Jewish riot...." from the late 19th century "pogroms, ... can be described as "genocidal behaviour" in that they involved mass murder of significant Jewish groups that were delimited by residence patterns, occupation, wealth or visibility.
2012	Yivo Encyclopedia	In general usage, a pogrom is an outbreak of mass violence directed against a minority religious, ethnic, or social group; it usually implies central instigation and control, or at minimum the passivity of local authorities.
2012	Encyclopedia Britannica	a mob attack, either approved or condoned by authorities, against the persons and property of a religious, racial, or national minority. The term is usually applied to attacks on Jews in the Russian Empire in the late 19th and early 20th centuries.

== Characteristics ==
Historian David Engel writes that "there can be no logically or empirically compelling grounds for declaring that some particular episode does or does not merit the label [pogrom]," but he offers that the majority of the incidents "habitually" described as pogroms have some shared characteristics. Characteristics frequently noted by scholars to be shared by events which have been labelled as pogroms, include:

- "Organized Riot": In his review of scholarly work on the topic, Bergmann writes that "there is agreement to the extent that pogroms are defined as a specific form of riot", although when discussion exactly how a pogrom is differentiated from other forms of riot he states "there is no consensus on terminology here among researchers." Comparing riots and pogroms, Paul R Brass writes: "The first carries the appearance of spontaneous, intergroup mass action, the second of deliberately organized—and especially—state-supported killings and the destruction of property of a targeted group. In fact, however, no hard and fast distinction can be made between these supposedly distinct forms of violence, since pogroms masquerade as riots and many, if not most, large-scale riots display features supposedly special to pogroms" The organization may or may not be as a result of government involvement. Russian pogroms were originally widely thought to have been officially sponsored, but according to Aleksei Miller, "participation of the authorities in setting up pogroms (even the one in Kishinev) can now be safely relegated to the realm of myth." Usage of the word has retained overtones of government involvement, although "the low level of organization separates [pogroms] from vigiliantism, terrorism, massacre, and genocide"
- "Persecution of a minority group": All definitions of the term suggest that victims are a "minority group" within a demographic, although this may be referred to as "ethnic", "racial", "cultural", "religious" or "national". Encyclopedia Britannica states that the victims of a pogrom are "persons and property of a specific religious, racial, or national minority". The victims are nationals or citizens of the same group as the attackers and as a minority group, there is an "imbalance of power" against the majority population. Engel writes that pogroms "took place in divided societies in which ethnicity or religion (or both) served as significant definers of both social boundaries and social rank... [and the] perpetrators expressed some complaint about the victims’ group, claiming collective injury or violation of one or more of their own group's cardinal values or legitimate prerogatives" According to Bergmann's review, "by the collective attribution of a threat, the pogrom differs from forms of violence, such as lynching, which are directed against individual members of a minority, while the imbalance of power in favor of the rioters distinguishes pogroms from other forms of riot".
- "Massacres": Pogroms are commonly, but not always, defined to include massacres or murders. Bergmann writes that "researchers frequently fail to distinguish between pogrom and massacre" and "the differences lie in the fact that massacres are conducted by more highly organized and better armed assailants (often military or police units)... whereas the elements typical to a pogrom [are] a large group of attackers acting on a short-term basis within a local framework, and the destruction and looting of property"

== Related terminology ==
Usage of the word pogrom overlaps with other terminology used to describe collective violence. Partial synonyms include:

- Ethnic riot: An ethnic riot is a riot focused on the persecution of an ethnic group. Donald L. Horowitz wrote in 2001 that "the pogrom is not so much a complementary species of interethnic violence as it is a subcategory of the ethnic riot". Prior to his death in 2007, scholar John Klier began preparing an article entitled "Were the Russian Pogroms a 'Deadly Ethnic RIot'?", referring to the term developed by Horowitz. In their 2002 book Exclusionary Violence: Antisemitic Riots in Modern German History, Christhard Hoffmann and Werner Bergmann use the term exclusionary ethnic riot or exclusionary riot as a synonym for pogrom.
- Genocidal massacre: A genocidal massacre is the killing of a local group within an ethnic minority, described by Leo Kuper as "the annihilation of a section of a group — men, women and children, as for example in wiping out of whole villages". George Andreopoulos wrote that "With [the] category [of genocidal massacres] we are now equipped to describe many pogroms, mass executions, and mass murders", referring to the term originally proposed by Kuper in 1982. William Schabas wrote that "Examples [of genocidal massacres] would be pogroms and mass executions. In a discussion of Balkan Genocides, Paul Mojzes wrote that "A more accurate meaning of pogrom is genocidal massacre", although Mojzes' definition of genocidal massacre is different to that of the other scholars mentioned.

== Scholarly commentary on usage ==
John Klier writes that in relation to a list of 13 events "characterized as "pogroms" by historians", "virtually the only common feature of these events was that Jews were among the victims, although they were not always the primary target" The YIVO Encyclopedia states that "The common usage of the term pogrom to describe any attack against Jews throughout history disguises the great variation in the scale, nature, motivation, and intent of such violence at different times" Klier writes that the term is now "a generic term in English for all forms of collective violence directed against Jews"

In the introduction to Anti-Jewish Violence: Rethinking the Pogrom in East European History, the authors call the term a "somewhat reductionist rubric" in a discussion of the benefits of its usage. In Ideology, Politics, and Diplomacy in East Central Europe, Neal Pease writes that "the Morgenthau report consciously strove to limit usage of the word "pogrom" as an elastic and imprecise term applied indiscriminately to a broad range of actions".

Alekseĭ I. Miller writes that "The diversity of phenomena hiding behind the word pogrom is one of the symptoms of the ideological engagement of historiography" and, referring to Zygmunt Bauman's comment on "anti-semitism" noted that "using the same name to denote phenomena separated by centuries hides as much as reveals... is true of the term “pogrom.”"

Engel wrote that events "habitually tagged pogroms" include many "disparate occurrences" ranging from an event which "caused no Jewish casualties and did minimal damage to property" to events in which thousands of Jews were massacred. Klier writes that events which have been "characterized as "pogroms"" include events such as one in which "Jews were neither the initial nor the principal targets" and another "amidst a complete breakdown of public order [in which the] widespread atrocities carried out by all combatants fell upon many different segments of the population".

Aleksei Miller writes that "We are more prepared to answer the question of what pogroms were not than the question or what a pogrom was," and John Klier writes that "To determine what pogroms were, it is essential to consider what they were not."

Rogers Brubaker writes that "Violence—and more generally, conflict—regularly occasions social struggles to label, interpret, and explain it", which Donald L. Horowitz calls "conflict over the nature of the conflict". Specifically, Brubaker writes that "To impose a label or prevailing interpretive frame—to cause an event to be seen as a "pogrom" or a "riot" or a "rebellion"—is no mere matter of external interpretation, but a constitutive and often consequential act of social definition".

In his work entitled "On the Study of Riots, Pogroms, and Genocide", University of Washington Professor Paul R Brass writes that once a scholar states whether in their view an event is "better labeled a pogrom than a riot, a massacre of innocents rather than a fair fight between groups, a genocide rather than a “mere” pogrom", scholars then "unavoidably, necessarily, become embroiled within and take a position upon the events we study." Brass writes that "The study of the various forms of mass collective violence has been blighted by methodological deficiencies and ideological premises... Our work then becomes entangled—even through the very theories we articulate—in the diversionary tactics that are essential to the production and reproduction of violence. The diversionary process begins with the issue of labelling, which itself is part of the process of production and reproduction of violence, and the post-hoc search for causes"

In "The Color of Words: An Encyclopaedic Dictionary of Ethnic Bias in the United States", Philip Herbst writes that the word "pogrom has been used loosely and, according to some, misused in an inflammatory way." John Klier writes that "when applied indiscriminately to events in Eastern Europe, the term can be misleading, the more so when it implies that "pogroms" were regular events in the region and that they always shared common features." In an interview with Bob Costas, Elie Wiesel suggested that he was bothered when the term was "misused and trivialized".

== See also ==
- Definitions of genocide
- Definitions of fascism
- Definitions of terrorism
- Holocaust trivialization
- Euphemism treadmill
- Semantic change
