= Dmitry Mikhailovich Golitsyn =

Dmitry Mikhailovich (or Mikhaylovich) Golitsyn may refer to the following people of the Golitsyn family:

- Dmitry Mikhailovich Golitsyn the Elder (1665–1737), Russian aristocrat who attempted to turn Russia into a constitutional monarchy
- Dmitry Mikhailovich Golitsyn the Younger (1721–1793), Russian diplomat, philanthropist and art collector, ambassador in Vienna

== See also ==
- Dmitry Golitsyn (disambiguation)
