= Alexander Trishatny =

Russian politician (1870–1920)

- Born: Тришатный, Александр Иосифович; 1870
- Disappeared: 1 April 1920 (aged 49–50)
- Citizenship: Russian Empire, ?
- Style: monarchism, antisemitism
- Political party: Union of Russian People
- Criminal charges: organization of pogroms, murders in 1905–17

Alexander Iosifovich Trishatny (Russian: Александр Иосифович Тришатный) (1870 – after 1920) was a Russian right-wing politician, one of the founders and leaders of the Union of the Russian People (URP), a loyalist right-wing nationalist party, the most important among Black-Hundredist monarchist and antisemitic political organizations in the Russian Empire of 1905–1917; Deputy Chairman of URP, member of its first Board, and one of the authors of the URP Charter. Concurrently, in 1905 he was a leader of URP peripheral branch in Yaroslavl.

== Family ==
Alexander Trishatny was born in 1870. A graduated engineer (university unknown). Collegiate secretary (title of X class; awarded to the best graduates of high school).

He disappeared in 1920. The date of his disappearance is uncertain, but is presumably before the last day when Sergei Trishatny was seen in Petrograd under Cheka detention, because the record of Sergei's interrogations does not mention his brother Alexander as dead or wanted.

== Union of Russian People ==
Alexander Trishatny was one of the founders of the Union of the Russian People, which was established on 8 November [O.S. 26 October] 1905 in Saint Petersburg. Trishatny was chosen as one of two deputy chairmen of the URP and was an organizer of an extensive regional network of URP local branches throughout the whole Russian Empire. It was on 6 December [O.S. 23 November] 1905 when Trishatny, with I. N. Katzaurov, set up the first URP peripheral city branch in Yaroslavl. Alexander Dubrovin, the URP chairman claimed that Trishatny set up about 60 peripheral party branches throughout the country.

On 4 January [O.S. 23 December] 1906 Alexander Trishatny attended, in a delegation of his party, the reception of czar Nicholas II. At this reception Trishatny gave a speech having read out a letter to the czar from the URP members of Yaroslavl, as a leader of this branch. The central point of this address to Nicholas II was a question, whether he shall preserve the foundations of autocracy in Russia. It is said, that the czar answered that "soon the sun of truth will shine over Russia and new laws will be issued that shall soothe everybody and dispel all doubts."

Alexander Trishatny is also named among those who wrote the Charter of the URP. In October 1906 Trishatny developed a guidance document Programme of organizational activities for the members of the Union of Russian People (Russian: «Программа работ по организации членов Союза Русского Народа»).

The organizational structure he proposed (and later, introduced) was a paramilitary network. Each 10 members composed desyatka ("ten") which was a primary unit under the command of desyatnik. Each 10 "tens" constituted a sotnya ("hundred") subordinated to sotnik; each 10 "hundreds" constituted a tysyacha ("thousand") subordinated to tysyachnik (modernized word tysyatsky).

== See also ==
- Alexander Dubrovin
- Black Hundreds
- List of people who disappeared
- Sergei Trishatny
- Union of the Russian People

== Sources ==
- Rawson, Don C. (March 1995). Russian rightists and the revambridge Russian, Soviet and Post-Soviet Studies (No. 95). Cambridge University Press. pp. xv, 312, 1 map, 28 tables. ISBN 978-0-521-48386-5.
- Klier J.D., Lambrozo S. (1992). Pogroms: Anti-Jewish Violence in Modern Russian History. Cambridge University Press. p. 415. ISBN 978-0-521-40532-4.
- John D. Klier (2005). "Black Hundreds". In Richard S. Levy (ed.). Antisemitism: a historical encyclopedia of prejudice and persecution. ABC-CLIO. pp. 828 total. ISBN 1-85109-444-X.
- Rogger, Hans (1986). "Was there a Russian Fascism? The Union of Russian People". Jewish policies and right-wing politics in imperial Russia. University of California Press. p. 289. ISBN 0-520-04596-3.
- Ascher, Abraham (1986). The Revolution of 1905: Authority restored. University of California Press. pp. 240, 276, 285, 358. ISBN 0-520-04596-3.
- Степанов, А. Д. Александр Иосифович Тришатный (in Russian).
- Oleg Platonov. "Указатель имён к тому 2 (гл. 57-85)". История русского народа в XX веке (in Russian).

== Works ==
- Русскому народу // Приложение к Симбирским епархиальным ведомостям. 1906. No. 19. — Симбирск
- За кулисами «освободительного» движения // Русское знамя. 1907. 6 янв.
- Где искать выхода? — СПб., 1907
- Правда о Союзе Русского Народа. — Томск, 1910.
