= Nikolai Markov (politician) =

Russian politician

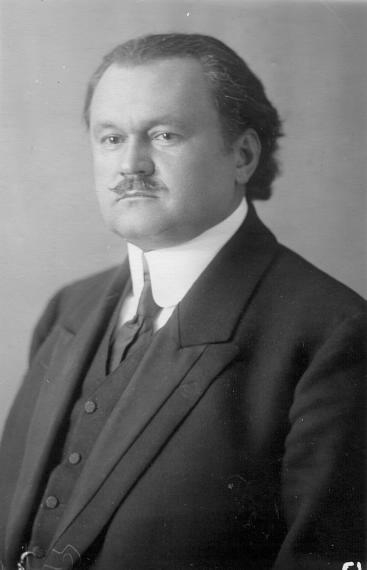
- Nikolai Markov, 1913
- Born: 2 April 1866; Simferopol, Taurida Governorate, Russian Empire
- Died: 25 April 1945 (aged 79); Wiesbaden, Nazi Germany
- Other name: Markov II
- Citizenship: Russian
- Occupations: Engineer, politician
- Known for: Leadership of the Union of the Russian People, antisemitic agitation

Nikolai Yevgenyevich Markov (Russian: Никола́й Евге́ньевич Ма́рков), known as Markov II or Markov the Second (Russian: Марков Второй) (2 April 1866 – 25 April 1945), was a Russian right wing politician who was a leading figure in the Union of the Russian People (UPR).

Born in Simferopol, where his father worked as director of a local gymnasium, Markov came from a land-owning noble background, the Markovs owning land in Shchigrovsky Uyezd in the Kursk region, while his mother's family, of German roots, were nobles from the Kaluga Governorate. Nikolai Markov was also a trained engineer, graduating from the Institute of Civil Engineering in St. Petersburg in 1888. He entered politics in 1905 when he formed a defence group for the upper middle classes called the Party of Civil Order, whilst also starting the journals Kurskaia Byl and Zemschchina. He became a founder of the UPR and was noted as its most formidable leader, using his membership of the State Duma of the Russian Empire to attack both capitalism and socialism. One of the leading antisemitic voices in the Russian Empire, he was known for his frequent tirades against Jews, whom he predicted would be wiped out in a mass pogrom. In 1911, during the discussions of the draft of the new Statute on Military Service he launched an attack on Jews in the military service, recommending the removal of Jews from the military.

He became URP leader in 1910 following the departure of Aleksandr Dubrovin and his followers and took over editorship of the pro-Vladimir Purishkevich journal Vestnik Soyuza Russkogo Naroda. He had long been associated with Purishkevich and had been a member of his "Union of Archangel Michael", a UPR dissident group. He used his position as leader to argue for a restoration of absolutism and in the First World War supported a separate peace treaty between Russia and Germany, even attempting to get the Germans involved in a conspiracy to save the House of Romanov after the revolutions. He was close to General Nikolai Yudenich and supported his anti-Bolshevik activity.

He fled to Germany following the October Revolution and set up the émigré Russian Monarchist Union, although he became more associated with the far right of the monarchist movement when he expressed his admiration for Italian fascism. He conspired to have Cyril Vladimirovich, Grand Duke of Russia crowned Tsar, a man whose wife, Viktoria Feodorovna, was close to far right former German Imperial Army general Erich Ludendorff. Markov also played a leading role in the conspiracy that resulted in the murder of Constitutional Democratic Party politician Vladimir Dmitrievich Nabokov. A devout member of the Russian Orthodox Church, he was involved in the Karlovtsy Sobor, a synod that led to the establishment of the Russian Orthodox Church Outside Russia.

He published his memoirs, Voiny temnykh sil (Wars of Dark Forces), in 1928 and soon thereafter became a follower of the Nazi Party. He would go on to argue that the URP had shared many characteristics with the Nazi Party, although this has been rejected given that the URP was little more than antisemitic populism. His antisemitism grew more pronounced in the 1930s and he undertook lecture tours and propaganda duties for the Nazis on the subject. Markov died in Germany shortly before the war ended.
