= Russkoye Znamya =

Russian far-right newspaper (1905–1917)

- Type: Daily newspaper
- Format: Broadsheet
- Publisher: Alexander Dubrovin
- Editor: I. S. Durnovo; P. B. Bulatsel’ (from March 1906)
- Founded: 11 December [O.S. 28 November] 1905
- Ceased publication: 18 March [O.S. 5 March] 1917
- Political alignment: Russian nationalism, monarchism, black-hundredist, antisemitism
- Language: Russian
- Headquarters: Petersburg, 4th Rota, 6 (1905–1909); Shpalernaya, 26 (1910–17)
- Circulation: 3,000–14,500

Russkoye Znamya (Russian: Русское знамя, romanized: Russian Banner, Russian pronunciation: [rʊskəjə ˈznamʲə]) was a newspaper, organ of the Union of the Russian People established in St. Petersburg by Alexander Dubrovin on 11 December [O.S. 28 November] 1905, notoriously known for its antisemitic bias.

It was discontinued on 18 March [O.S. 5 March] 1917 by the order of Petrograd Soviet.

== History ==
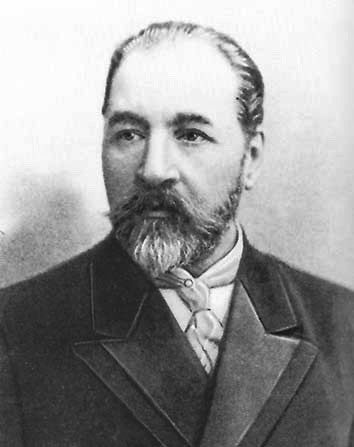
A. Dubrovin, the founder.

From the first issue in November 1905 until the end of the year Russkoye Znamya was released weekly. Became daily from January 1906. Its first editor was I. S. Durnovo. From March 1906 editor's duties were assumed by P. B. Bulatsel’.

Russkoye Znamya was regularly sponsored by the Moscow merchantess Ye. A. Poluboyarinova. It was also subsidized by the Russian government.

The URP chairman Alexander Dubrovin often published articles in this newspaper. Other active authors were: D. I. Bulatovich, G. V. Butmi, L. Ye. Katansky, N. E. Markov, N. A. Pavlov, V. M. Purishkevich, Alexander Trishatny.

Among other contributors M. N. Zelensky, A. V. Ososov, Ye. D. Khomenkov, S. S. Potapochkin, F. D. Klyuev, V. A. Bogdanov, N. I. Yeremchenko and M. P. Petrov are named.

Up to 1909 the editorial office was located at 4th Rota (now 4th Krasnoarmeyskaya Street), 6. In 1910 it moved to Shpalernaya Street, 26.

== Political alignment ==
The motto of Russkoye Znamya, "For Orthodox Belief, Autocratic Czar, Indivisible Fatherland and Russia for Russians", was stylistically processed so that even while inverted, this phrase would sound fabulous and epic.

Russkoye Znamya has consistently advocated unlimited autocracy and became notoriously known for its pronounced antisemitic stance. In its critical and accusatory articles against the State Duma, liberal and leftist radicals the newspaper often went beyond censored limitations and hence was repeatedly harassed for libel and defamation. In 1905-10 it was warned 13 times; 6 times it was fined at a total sum of 11.000 rubles, and 18 rooms were seized.

Having supported in 1914 the slogan of "the war to the bitter end", in the course of World War I the newspaper abandoned it in favour of calls for the alliance with German monarchy for the sake of saving both country from the impending revolutions. In 1916 its financial standing deteriorated resulting in cutting its size from 4 to 2 pages.

4 days after the February Revolution, on 18 March [O.S. 5 March] 1917 Russkoye Znamya was discontinued by one of the first orders of Petrograd Soviet.
