= Union of the Russian People =

Russian loyalist far-right nationalist political party (1905–1917)

Union of the Russian People Союз русского народа
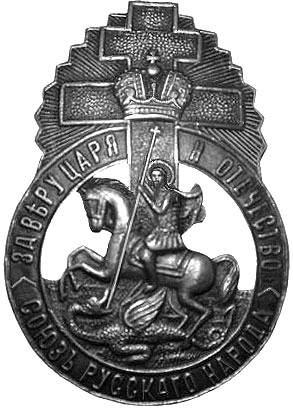
- Founded: 1905; 121 years ago
- Banned: 1917; 109 years ago
- Succeeded by: Union of the Russian People
- Newspaper: Russkoye Znamya
- Membership: approx. 334,000 (1907 est.)
- Ideology: Authoritarian nationalism; Monarchism; Anti-communism; Russian Imperialism; Orthodox nationalism; Racial antisemitism; Anti-intellectualism; Proto-fascism (disputed)
- Political position: Far-right
- Slogan: "For the Tsar, Faith and Fatherland"
- Anthem: "God Save the Tsar!"

Party flag

Website
- http://srn.rusidea.org/

The Union of the Russian People (URP; Russian: Союз русского народа, romanized: Soyuz russkogo naroda, СРН/SRN) was a royalist far-right nationalist political party, the most important among Black-Hundredist monarchist political organizations in the Russian Empire between 1905 and 1917. Since 2005, organizational cells of the Union have been undergoing a revival in Russia and Ukraine.

Founded in October 1905, its aim was to rally the people behind Great Russian nationalism and the Tsar, espousing anti-socialist, anti-liberal, and above all antisemitic views. By 1906, it had over 300,000 members. Its paramilitary armed bands, called the Black Hundreds, fought revolutionaries violently in the streets. Its leaders organised a series of political assassinations of deputies and other representatives of parties which supported the Russian Revolution of 1905, most notably the murders of Mikhail Herzenstein and Grigory Iollos, both Kadet Duma deputies, responsibility for which was later acknowledged by URP leader Nikolai Markov.

The Union was dissolved in 1917 in the wake of the February Revolution, and its leader, Alexander Dubrovin, was placed under arrest and died under mysterious circumstances. Some modern academic researchers view the Union of the Russian People as an early example of fascism, while others treat it as a proto-fascist precursor that ultimately fell short of that designation.

== Ideology and political views ==
=== Fascism, nationalism and scholarly debate ===
Historians have debated the extent to which the Union of the Russian People anticipated the fascist movements of inter-war Europe. Orlando Figes describes it as "an early Russian version of the Fascist movement": anti-liberal, anti-socialist and above all antisemitic, it spoke of restoring a "popular autocracy" which it claimed had existed before Russia was taken over by "the Jews and intellectuals". As with the fascist movements of inter-war Europe, the URP drew its mass support chiefly from those who had either lost, or feared losing, their petty status as a result of modernisation and reform: uprooted peasants drawn into the towns as casual labourers, small shopkeepers and artisans squeezed by big business, and low-ranking officials and policemen threatened by new democratic institutions.

Stanley Payne, however, cautions against too direct an identification with fascism. He characterises the URP as combining "authoritarian monarchism and a vague corporatism with some effort at mass mobilisation and nominal social reform", based above all on "an appeal to traditional religiosity of an obscurantist sort". It emphasised strong-arm units (the Black Hundreds) more than any contemporary western European rightist group, and was extreme in its "semiracial anti-Semitism and support of the new style of Russian nationalist imperialism". Russia before 1914, Payne argues, was "too underdeveloped to harbour all the stimuli and forces which would soon bring fascism to life in central Europe", and though the URP was "moving in the direction of fascism, [it] was as yet very far from reaching this indistinct goal". (Note: Payne (1995), p. 69. Payne cites H. Rogger, "Was There a Russian Fascism? The Union of Russian People", Journal of Modern History 36:4 (Dec. 1964): 398–415, and W. Laqueur, Black Hundred: The Rise of the Extreme Right in Russia (New York, 1993), pp. 26–27, in support of this assessment.)

The URP's nationalism was explicitly Great Russian in character. Its first declared aim was "a Great Russia, United and Indivisible", and its nationalism was rooted in racism and xenophobia: the supremacy of the Great Russians was to be defended throughout the Empire.

=== Government and administration ===
The Union of the Russian People called for the 'restoration of the popular autocracy', a concept they believed had existed before Russia had been taken over by 'intellectuals and Jews'. Its founding programme declared "a durable unity of the Russian people of all classes and professions to work for the general good of our fatherland — a Russia united and indivisible", a phrase that captured the Union's rejection of any federalism or national autonomy within the Empire. The Statute described the Duma not as a legislative body but as one whose role was solely to "inform [the Tsar] of the real needs of the people and of the state", explicitly forbidding it from placing any "limitations on the supreme authority of the Tsar". The establishment of the State Duma by Nicholas II was interpreted by the Union's ideologists as the restoration of moral and religious unity between the tsar and his subjects through providing representatives of Orthodox peasants with ability to act as counselors to the monarch. Supporting the Duma in this limited sense, the Union opposed the rule of bureaucracy, which its leaders claimed to be controlled by "non-Russian elements".

The Union's political program in the 1906 elections to the Russian State Duma envisioned the provision of equal rights and duties to Cossacks of Poltava, Kiev, Chernigov and Bessarabia Governorates with members of other Cossack hosts. This could be interpreted as a call for the restoration of the Cossack stratum in Ukrainian lands with the goal of using it against Catholic and Polish influences. Local branches of the Union supported Cossack autonomy of the Don and condemned the government's policy in respect to peripheral regions of the empire, such as Siberia, which they saw as promoting economic exploitation by foreign capitalists to the detriment of the local population.

=== Religion and society ===
According to its 1906 statute, the Union saw the protection of Eastern Orthodoxy, preservation of Autocracy and defense of Nationality as its main goals. While declaring that "all subjects of the Empire have the freedom of religious worship", it firmly stated that "the Orthodox faith remains steadfastly the official religion of the Russian Empire". It supported the reestablishment of Moscow Patriarchy and provisional of canonical self-government to the Russian Orthodox Church. Members of the Union opposed the freedom of religion, lobbied a ban on attending Catholic churches for the Orthodox and supported the introduction of anathema for converts into Catholicism, restoration of Orthodox brotherhoods and other measures directed against the Catholic Church.

On the local level, the Union's activists cooperated with the Orthodox Church, promoting conservative public morals, working to preserve the social order and supporting elements of local self-government. As part of these policies, in some locations members of Orthodox parishes were banned from trading on Christian holidays and having common business with Jews; local activists of the Union campaigned against the consumption of alcohol and prevented the organization of khorovods, vechornytsi and similar events; special peasant patrols were organized to combat thievery, frequently with the use of corporal punishment.

=== National minorities ===
The Union was the leading exponent of antisemitism in the wake of the 1905 Revolution. Its founding programme and statute codified this antisemitism in concrete institutional terms: Jews were explicitly barred from membership in the Union "even if they had accepted Christianity", and the programme proposed that the entire Jewish population of the Russian Empire be permitted to elect no more than three deputies to the State Duma, justified by what it described as the "disruptive, anti-state activity of the united Jewish masses". Its leaders further opposed what they saw as economic domination of the Orthodox majority by Jews, and some went as far as to propose the resettlement of all Jews to Palestine. Antisemitism was brought into the URP by what became the organisation's ideological core, chairman Alexander Dubrovin, Vladimir Purishkevich, Pavel Krushevan, Pavel Bulatsel and some other 'radical temperament anti-Semitic rabble-rousers', who had seceded from the Russian Assembly. The methods of the Union were not what the Russian Assembly considered proper conduct.

The Union actively campaigned against Ukrainian self-determination and in particular, against the 'cult' of the popular Ukrainian poet Taras Shevchenko. At the same time, the organization's leaders in ethnic Ukrainian lands, most notably archbishop Antony Khrapovitsky, tended to oppose ethnic nationalism in favour of a broader identity based on the Orthodox Christian faith. The Union's activists in Ukraine published part of their press in the Ukrainian language and used the memory about Cossacks, elements of Ukrainian folk culture and works by prominent Ukrainian authors, including Shevchenko, as parts of their propaganda.

=== Economy ===
In economic matters, the Union promoted the purchase of lands from feudal owners by the state in order to sell them to poorer peasants on an affordable price. Some representatives of the Union in the State Duma went as far as to demand free provision of land to peasants, which greatly increased the party's popularity. The Statute explicitly stated that the Union would advocate that "poor peasants be given more land" and called for a broad programme of agricultural education to improve the productivity of Russian farming. Papers published by the Union also worked to provide the rural population with information on modern agricultural techniques. In order to fight against supposed Jewish domination, the Union promoted boycotting of businesses owned by Jews and supported the creation of cooperatives.

== History ==
=== Creation ===
The Union of the Russian people was by far the most important of the extreme rightist groups formed in the wake of the 1905 Revolution. It was founded in October 1905 as a movement to mobilise and rally the masses against the Left. Initiative for its creation is attributed to three figures: physician Alexander Dubrovin, artist Apollo Maikov, and Hegumen Arseny (Alexeyev). The creation of the movement was personally approved by Emperor Nicholas II.

=== 1905–1906 ===
Five days after the proclamation of the October Manifesto on 30 October [O.S. 17 October] 1905, Purishkevich, Apollo Apollonovich Maikov (son of poet Apollon Maykov), Pavel Bulatzel, Baranov, Vladimir Gringmut and some others gathered at Dubrovin's home. At this meeting, they concurred with Dubrovin's idea to set up a political organization (Dubrovin opposed to calling it a party). In a couple of weeks initiators worked out an organisational structure, devised a program, and on 8 November [O.S. 26 October] 1905 formally announced the founding of the Union of the Russian People. Dubrovin was elected its chairman.

The Union's Manifesto expressed a 'plebeian mistrust' of every political party, as well as the bureaucracy and the intelligentsia. The group looked at these as obstacles to 'the direct communion between the Tsar and his people'. This struck a deep chord with Nicholas II, who also shared the deep belief in re-establishment of autocratic personal rule, as had existed in the Muscovite state of the 1600s. It also stood for the russification of non-Russian citizens. The charter was adopted in August 1906.

=== Support ===
After the 1905 Revolution the Orthodox Church's conservative clergy members allied with extreme Rightist organisations, the Union of the Russian People being one of them, in opposing the liberals' further attempts at a church reform and extension of religious freedom and toleration. Several prominent, leading church members were also supportive of the organisation, among them the royal family's close friend and future Orthodox Saint John of Kronstadt, Iliodor the monk, and Bishop Hermogenes. Each local department of the Union of the Russian People had its own khorugvs and icons, which were kept in local cathedrals or monasteries. The opening of the departments of the Union of the Russian People was always accompanied by solemn prayer services, which were served by local bishops, in the person of the latter, the Russian Church gave its official blessing to the Union of the Russian People and recommended the latter to its clerics. In fact, into the orbit of the Union of the Russian People the entire episcopate was involved. It also had support from leading members of the court and government, one of the supporters being the Minister of the Interior Nikolay Maklakov.

Tsar Nicholas II was highly supportive of the Union and patronised it: he wore the badge of the Union, and wished the Union and its leaders 'total success' in their efforts to unite what he called 'loyal Russians' in defence of the autocracy. The Tsar also gave orders to provide funds for the Union, and the Ministry of the Interior complied by funding the Union's newspapers, and also providing them with weapons through secret channels. Dubrovin was also in contact with senior officials and the secret services of Russia. Minister of the Interior Pyotr Durnovo was completely in the know about the foundation of the Union while his subordinates actively worked upon creation of an open organisation to counteract the influence of revolutionaries and liberals among the masses. Around the same time the head of the political section of gendarmes department Pyotr Rachkovsky reported his chief, Colonel (later General) Alexander Vasiliyevich Gerasimov about such attempts and proposed Gerasimov to introduce him to Dubrovin. Their meeting took place in late October 1905 in the apartment of Rachkovsky.

With powerful administrative support and funding at their disposal, the Union of the Russian People managed to organise and conduct its first mass public event less than a fortnight after its creation. The first public rally of the URP, with about 2,000 attendance, was held on November, 21 [O.S. 8] 1905 in Mikhailovsky Manege, a popular venue in Petersburg. An orchestra was playing, a church choir sang "Praise God" and "Tsar Divine"; leaders of the URP (Dubrovin, Purishkevich, Bulatsel, Nikolsky) addressed the mob from a rostrum erected in the centre of the arena. Special guests from the "Russian Assembly": Prince M. N. Volkonsky, journalist from Novoye Vremya Nikolai Engelhardt and two bishops also welcomed the new party with their speeches. Members of the Tsar's court, like Grand Duke Nikolai Nikolayevich, Alexander Trepov, and other government officials and clergy members 'unquestionably welcomed a movement such as this'. Sergei Witte was a rare occasion among high-ranking officials being 'unequivocally hostile to the URP' (in his memoirs he calls Dubrovin a 'high-handed and abusive leader').

=== Street fighting ===
The Union was horrified by Tsar Nicholas II's refusal to strike down harshly on the Leftist revolutionaries. The Union, therefore, decided to organise this for the Tsar, and organised paramilitary bands, which came to be known as the 'Black Hundreds' by the democrats, to fight revolutionaries in the streets. These militant groups marched through the streets holding in their pockets knives and brass knuckles, and carrying religious symbols such as icons and crosses and imperial ones such as patriotic banners and portraits of Tsar Nicholas II. They marched through the streets fighting to 'revenge themselves' and restore the old hierarchy of society and races. Their numbers were swelled by thousands of criminals who had been released as a part of the October amnesty, who looked at it as a chance of violence and pillaging. Often encouraged by police officers, they beat up suspected democratic sympathisers, making them kneel before tsarist portraits or making them kiss the Imperial flag. In October 1906, they formed a Black-Hundredist organisation called Russian People United (Russian: Объединённый русский народ, romanized: Ob'yedinyonniy russkiy narod).

=== 1906–1917 ===
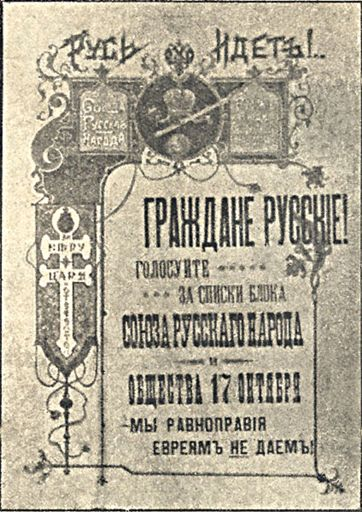
Joint electoral campaign poster of the Union of the Russian People and the Union of October 17 (Octobrists Party)

By 1906, the Union had a total of 300,000 members across 1,000 branches. Most of their supporters came from the social stratum which had either lost – or were afraid of losing – their status in society as a result of reform and modernisation – much like the supporters of fascism – among them working were labourers, policemen and other low-ranking state officials who risked losing their power, and small shopkeepers and artisans who were losing the competition against big business and industry.

By 1907, there were reportedly up to 900 local URP branches across many cities, towns, and even villages. Apart from the ones named above, the largest were in Kiev, Saratov and Astrakhan; Volhynian Governorate is also mentioned among the largest by the representation of the URP: one-quarter of all members of the organization belonged to its filial based in Pochaiv, Volhynia. The Union opposed Stolypin's reforms, being supporters of the 'legitimist bloc' which, through its support in the court, church, nobility, and the Union, defeated nearly all of Stolypin's reform proposals.

The Union also became the main instigator (through meetings, gatherings, lectures, manifestations and mass public prayers) of the pogroms against Jews (especially in 1906 in Gomel, Yalta, Białystok, Odessa, Sedlets and other cities), in which members of the URP often took an active part. In the wake of the Beiliss Affair, Nicholas II used the large wave of antisemitism in the population, spread and rallied by groups such as the Union of the Russian People, to rally support for his regime. It was one of the first extreme Rightist groups to have proclaimed a charge of ritual murder, and it supported the anti-Semitic persecution throughout the trial of Menahem Beiliss.

In 1908, URP members of the clergy petitioned for the right to carry weapons; however, the petition was denied. In 1909, the Union of the Russian People planned to organize a congress in Poltava to mark the 200th anniversary of the victory of Russian troops over the Swedes near the city. However, Nicholas II refused to give permission to hold the event, as a result of which the Union's authority among the population was greatly diminished.

From 1908 onwards, infighting broke the URP into several competing factions: the Michael the Archangel Russian People's Union founded by Purishkevich, Dubrovin's own splinter group registered in August 1912 as the All-Russian Dubrovin Union of the Russian People (Russian: Всероссийский дубровинский Союз русского народа в Петербурге, romanized: Vserossiysky dubrovinsky Soyuz russkogo naroda v Peterburge), and a reconstituted main URP whose leadership passed to Nikolai Markov in November 1912. After the February Revolution of 1917, all of the Black-Hundredist organisations were forcefully dissolved and banned. Soon after the February Revolution of 1917, the URP was suspended, and its leader Alexander Dubrovin was arrested.

== Party leaders and organisation ==
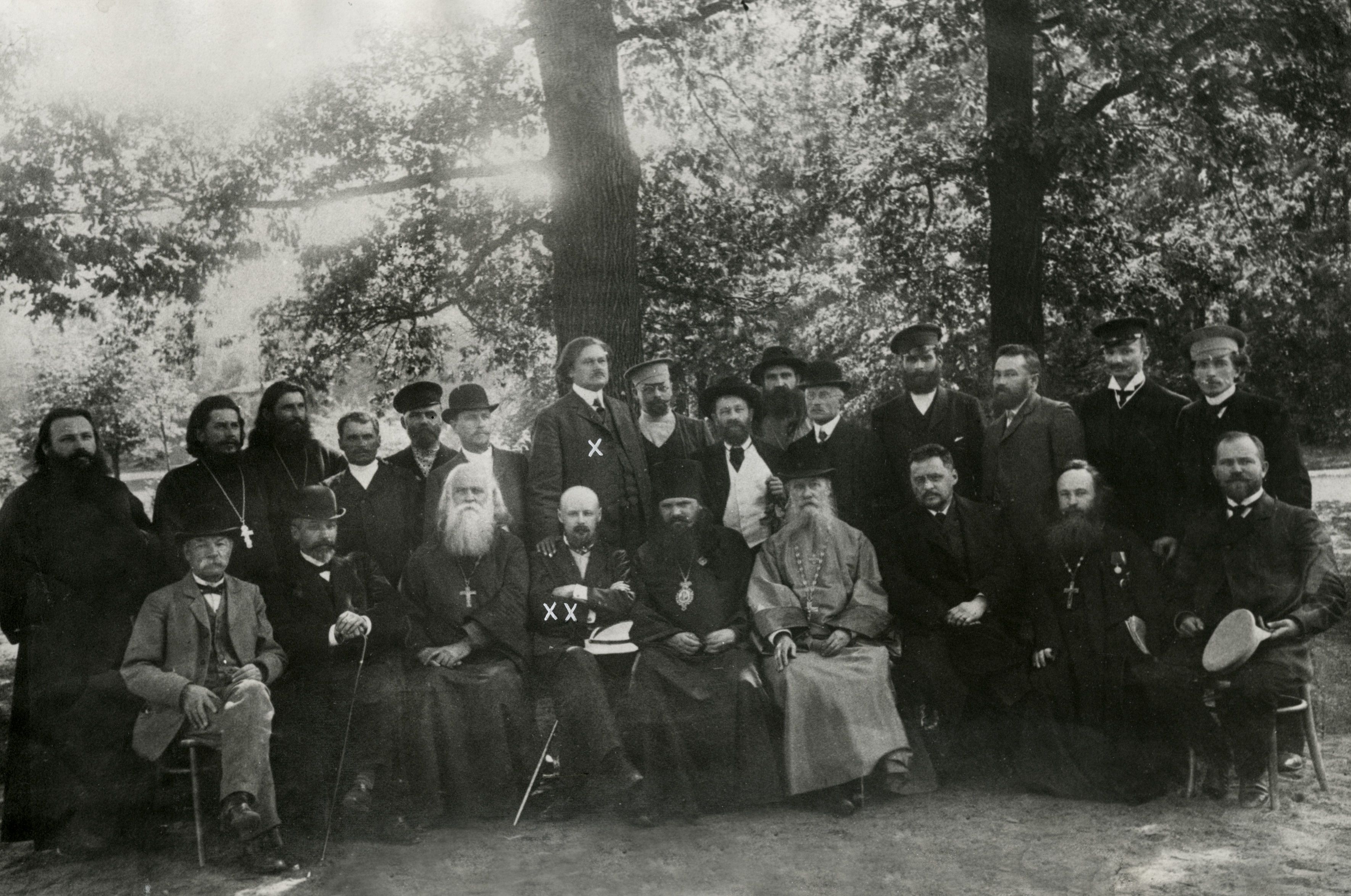
Group photo of members including Nikolai Markov and Vladimir Purishkevich (1916)

The supreme body of URP was called the Main Council (Russian: Главный Совет, romanized: Glavny Soviet). Alexander Dubrovin served as chairman from the party's founding in 1905 until its dissolution in 1917, with two deputy chairmen: noble landowner and future Duma deputy Vladimir Purishkevich, and engineer Alexander Trishatny. Trishatny was also one of the principal authors of the URP Charter and organised an extensive regional network across the Empire, with Dubrovin crediting him with establishing some sixty local branches. Purishkevich held his post until 1907, when internal disputes led him to break from the URP and found the Michael the Archangel Russian People's Union.

Trishatny also resigned at that time but returned briefly to the deputy chairmanship in 1908 following Purishkevich's departure, before stepping down permanently. From six other board members (Pavel Bulatzel, George Butmi, P. P. Surin and others) four belonged to the merchant estate, and two were peasants by origin. A merchant from Petersburg I. I. Baranov was the treasurer of the URP, and barrister Sergei Trishatny (elder brother of Alexander Trishatny) performed as secretary. Another leading intellectual of the URP was B. V. Nikolsky, privatdozent (senior lecturer) at Petersburg University.

The arguably most influential organization of the Union outside of the imperial capitals was active in Kyiv, centre of the Southwestern Krai. The Kyiv Department of the Union of Russian People was led by Anatoly Savenko and Vasily Shulgin as its most prominent members. Later the Main Council increased to 12 members, among which S. D. Chekalov, M. N. Zelensky, Ye. D. Golubev, N. N. Yazykov, G. A. Slipak are mentioned. Walter Laqueur characterised the social composition of the URP as "a strange mixture of aristocracy, petty bourgeoisie and the dregs of large cities".

=== Newspapers ===
URP's chief newspaper was Russkoe znamya (Russian Banner), a newspaper which first published the notorious "Protocols of the Elders of Zion". In provincial Russia The Pochayev Circular (Russian: Pochayevsky listok) was the most popular of the URP newspapers. URP also printed its propaganda materials in Moskovskiye Vedomosti ("Moscow News"), Grazhdanin ("Citizen"), Kievlyanin ("Kievan") and others.

== Modern revival and current activity ==
The founding congress of the revived Union of the Russian People was held in Moscow on 21 November 2005 at the Gorbunov Palace of Culture, chosen to coincide with the feast day of the Synaxis of the Archangel Michael. Vyacheslav Klykov, a prominent Russian sculptor, was elected the first chairman, and a new Charter was adopted. The governing Supreme Council, alongside Klykov, comprised sixty members committed to an Orthodox-monarchist programme in explicit continuity with the pre-revolutionary organisation.

Following Klykov's death in June 2006, General Leonid Ivashov was elected chairman at a second congress in November 2006, a choice contested by many of Klykov's associates who considered Ivashov insufficiently committed to the organisation's Orthodox identity. Ivashov's public statements soon confirmed their concerns: he declared he would not lead an organisation defined by "Orthodox-monarchist marginal ideas" and expressed support for President Putin's policies, holding Main Council meetings under a portrait of Stalin. This ideological shift prompted the opposition to convene a rival congress in Irkutsk in May 2007, supported by nine of the twelve Klykov-era regional departments, which elected Alexander Turik as chairman and declared the restoration of the traditional programme.

By autumn 2007, the name "Union of the Russian People" was being used simultaneously by at least five distinct and competing groups, including Ivashov's faction, Turik's Orthodox-monarchist wing, an atheist grouping under Sergei Kucherov, and a neo-pagan splinter. After Ivashov resigned in November 2008, further fragmentation followed. The Merkulov faction eventually dissolved into the Monarchist Party of Russia in 2010, leaving Turik's organisation as the principal surviving successor to the 2005 revival, having grown to some 45 regional departments and groups by autumn 2011.

The Union of the Russian People has also maintained a presence in Ukraine since at least 2010, though its activity there has been contested and fragmented along similar lines.

== See also ==
- Black Hundreds
