= Dmitry Golitsyn (disambiguation) =

Dmitry Golitsyn (1771–1844) was a Russian cavalry general.

Dmitry Golitsyn, under variant transliterations, may also refer to:

- Dmitry Mikhailovich Golitsyn the Elder (1665–1737), Russian aristocrat and constitutionalist
- Dmitry Mikhailovich Golitsyn the Younger (1721–1793), Russian diplomat in Vienna
- Dmitri Alekseyevich Gallitzin (1738–1803), Russian ambassador to the Netherlands
- Demetrius Augustine Gallitzin (1770–1840), the first Roman Catholic priest ordained in America
- Dmitri Petrovich Golitsyn (1860–1928), Russian writer and politician, leader of the Russian Assembly
