= Dmitri Petrovich Golitsyn =

Russian writer, politician and public figure

Dmitri Golitsyn
- Дмитрий Голицын
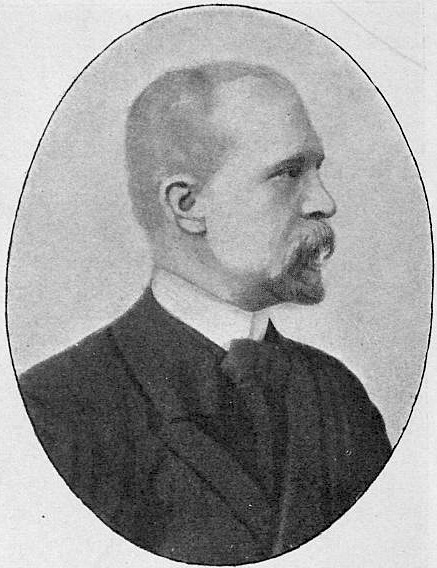
- Golitsyn in 1915

Member of the State Council
- In office 6 April 1912 – 27 December 1917

Personal details
- Born: 6 December 1860 Saint Petersburg, Russian Empire
- Died: 16 December 1928 (aged 68) Visegrád, Hungary
- Party: Russian Assembly
- Education: Tsarskoye Selo Lyceum
- Occupation: Writer, politician

Prince Dmitry Petrovich Golitsyn (Russian: Дмитрий Петрович Голицын;1860–1928) was a writer, politician and public figure in the Russian Empire.

He was the leader of the Russian Assembly, a right-wing political group opposed to westernisation, and advocated 'Orthodoxy, Autocracy, and Nationality'.

== Bibliography ==
- Figes, Orlando (2014). A People's Tragedy: The Russian Revolution 1891–1924. London: The Bodley Head. ISBN 9781847922915.
