= Nikolai Engelhardt (writer) =

Russian writer, critic, poet, journalist, memoirist and literary historian

- Николай Александрович Энгельгардт
- Born: Nikolai Alexandrovich Engelhardt; 15 February 1867; Saint Petersburg, Russian Empire
- Died: January 1942 (aged 74); Leningrad, USSR
- Occupation: writer • poet • critic • journalist
- Known for: co-founder and one of the original leaders of the Russian Assembly (Russkoye Sobranye)
- Spouse: Larisa Garelina

Nikolai Alexandrovich Engelhardt (Russian: Никола́й Алекса́ндрович Энгельга́рдт, 15 February 1867, Saint Petersburg, Russian Empire, — January 1942, Leningrad, USSR) was a Russian writer, critic, poet, journalist (associated mainly with Alexey Suvorin's Novoye Vremya), memoirist and literary historian, co-founder and one of the original leaders of the Russian Assembly (Russkoye Sobranye). The writer and agricultural scientist Alexander Engelgardt was his father.

Engelhardt's best-known works include the historical novel Pavel I The Bloodied Throne (Окровавленный трон, 1907), The History of Russian Censorship. 1703-1903 (1904), The History of Russian Literature in the 19th Century (1912), the book of memoirs Episodes of the Past (Давние эпизоды, 1911) as well as numerous literary essays (on Nikolai Gogol, Alexander Pushkin, Ivan Turgenev and Maxim Gorky, among many others).

Engelhardt married Larisa Garelina (1864–1942), Konstantin Balmont's first wife, and adopted her son, Nikolai Balmont (1890–1924). Their daughter Anna Engelhardt (1895—1942) became the second wife of Nikolai Gumilyov. Nikolai Alexandrovich Engelhardt (as well as his wife and daughter) died of starvation in besieged Leningrad in January 1942.
