= David Engel (historian) =

American historian

- Born: David Joshua Engel; 1951 (age 74–75)
- Occupation: Historian
- Title: Professor of Holocaust and Judaic Studies

Academic background
- Education: UCLA
- Thesis: (1979)

Academic work
- Discipline: History
- Sub-discipline: Holocaust studies

David Engel (born 1951) is an American historian and Professor of Holocaust and Judaic Studies at New York University. Engel received his Ph.D. from the University of California in Los Angeles in 1979, and completed postdoctoral study at Hebrew University's Division of Holocaust Studies, Institute for Contemporary Jewry in Jerusalem.

David Engel is a Fellow of the Diaspora Research Institute at Tel Aviv University; and a member of the Carnegie Commission on Ethics and International Affairs and the Commission on Polish-Jewish Relations since 2002. In 1986–87 Engel received Outstanding Lecturer honours at Tel Aviv University; in 1996 he was given the Golden Dozen Award for Excellence in Undergraduate Teaching at New York University.

== Publications ==
- Zionism. Harlow, England: Pearson Longman, 2009 (series: Short histories of big ideas).
- Between Liberation and Flight: Holocaust Survivors in Poland and the Struggle for Leadership, 1944–1946, in Hebrew. Tel Aviv: Am Oved Publishers, 1996.
- Facing a Holocaust: The Polish Government-in-Exile and the Jews, 1943–1945. University of North Carolina Press, 1993.
- In the Shadow of Auschwitz: The Polish Government-in-Exile and the Jews, 1939–1942. University of North Carolina Press, 1987.
