= Russian Assembly =

Russian far-right monarchist political party (1900–1917)

Russian Assembly Русское собрание
- Abbreviation: RS
- Leader: Dmitry Golitsyn
- Founded: November 1900
- Dissolved: March 1917
- Headquarters: Saint Petersburg
- Ideology: Official Nationalism; Monarchism; Conservatism; Russian nationalism Antisemitism
- Political position: Right-wing to Far-right
- Religion: Russian Orthodox Church

The Russian Assembly (Russian: Русское собрание) was a Russian loyalist, right-wing, monarchist political group (party). It was founded in Saint Petersburg in October−November 1900, and dismissed in 1917. It was led by Prince Dmitry Golitsyn. It opposed liberal western parliamentarianism, and advocated 'the old formula of Autocracy, Orthodoxy and Nationality'.

It consisted mainly of right-wing officers and civil-servants in St. Petersburg.

== Leaders ==
The first congress (rally) of the Russian Assembly took place on February 25 [O.S. 12] 1901 in Petersburg. It approved the rights of 120 full members of the party and elected the supreme governing body, the Board of 18 members. Prince Dmitrii Golitsyn was elected chairman of the Council; members of the Board journalist Aleksey Suvorin and writer Sergei Syromyatnikov as his two deputies (Russian: товарищи председателя).

Another 15 members of the first Board were:

- Army generals: Mikhail Borodkin, Alexander Vasilyev, count N. Geiden, Akim Zolotaryov;
- Statesmen: baron R. Disterlo, V. Lyschinsky, Alexander Krivoshein, Alexey Kharuzin; librarian of the State Chancellery S. Yuferov;
- Publishers Col. Vissarion Komarov and Alexey Suvorin, censor Nikolai M. Sokolov
- Writers A. Papkov and Nikolai Engelhardt, poet Vasilii Velichko.

Among those elected to the Board subsequently were

- Nobility: Princes – Mikhail Nikolaevich Volkonsky (later one of the leaders of the Union of Russian People), Аnatolii Kurakin, A. Lobanov-Rostovsky, M. Shakhovskoy; Counts – P. Apraksin, Aleksei Bobrinsky, Sergei Toll; Baron M. Taube.
- Clergy: bishop Seraphim Chichagov (later one of the founders of the Union of Russian People)
- Statesmen: Alexei Khvostov, Vladimir Gurko, M. Govorukha-Otrok, A. Karamzin, N. Myasoedov, A. Chemodurov, Nikolai Zverev (later one of the founders of the Russian Peripheral Society).

== Notable members ==
- Prime ministers Boris Stürmer and Alexander Trepov
- Minister of Interior Vyacheslav von Plehve
- Statesmen: Vladimir Purishkevich, Nikolai Zaionchkovskii
- Army generals: N. Peshkov, N. Belyavsky, Konstantin Velichko, P. Mitropolski
- Publisher S. Voyeikov; editors Pavel Bulatzel (newspaper "Russkoye Znamya"), A. Puryshev ("Vestnik Russkogo Sobraniya"); journalist S. Bournashev
- Professors and historians: Timofei Butkevich, Platon Kulakovskii, Boris Nikolskiy, V.Pogozhev.

== Bibliography ==
- Figes, Orlando (2014). A People's Tragedy: The Russian Revolution 1891–1924. London: The Bodley Head. ISBN 9781847922915.
- Rawson, Don C. (March 1995). Russian rightists and the revolution of 1905. Cambridge Russian, Soviet and Post-Soviet Studies (No. 95). Cambridge University Press. pp. xv, 312, 1 map, 28 tables. ISBN 978-0-521-48386-5.
- Rogger, Hans (1986). "The Formation of the Russian Right: 1900–1906". Jewish policies and right-wing politics in imperial Russia. University of California Press. pp. 188–210. ISBN 0-520-04596-3.
