= Black Hundreds =

Early 20th-century Russian monarchist movement

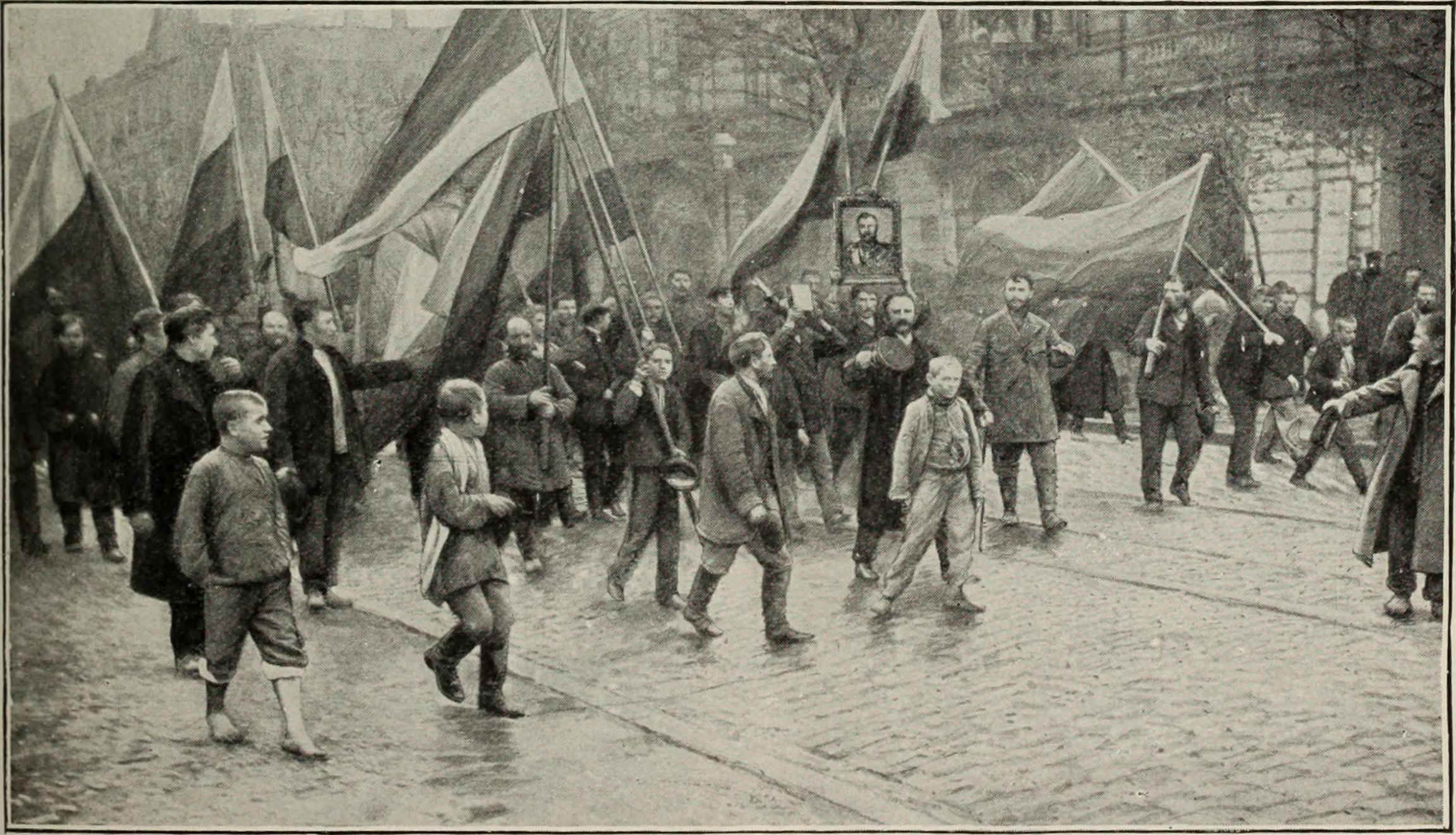
Supporters of the Black Hundreds marching in Odessa shortly after the October Manifesto, 1905

The Black Hundreds (Note: Russian: Чёрная сотня, romanized: Chyornaya sotnya. Also known as the Black-Hundredists (Russian: черносотенцы; chernosotentsy).) were reactionary, monarchist, proto-fascist and ultra-nationalist groups in Russia in the early 20th century. They were staunch supporters of the House of Romanov, and opposed any retreat from the autocracy of the reigning monarch. Their name arose from the medieval concept of "black", or common (non-noble) people, organized into militias.

The Black Hundreds were noted for extremism and incitement of pogroms, nationalistic Russocentric doctrines, as well as various xenophobic beliefs, including virulent antisemitism, anti-Polish sentiment and anti-Catholic sentiment, as well as sentiment against Ukrainians. The Black Hundreds attracted large numbers of members from all Orthodox Eastern Slavic folks (Russians / 'Great Russians', Ukrainians / ‘Little Russians’ or Belarusians / 'White Russians') who subscribed to the ideas of ‘pan-Russian’ Orthodox monarchism. The most frequent Jewish pogroms involving members of the Black Hundreds took place in the governments of the Jewish ‘Pale of Settlement’, where the Ukrainian and the Cossack population predominated (a group which, both culturally and ethnically, stood between the ‘Great’ and ‘Little’ Russians).

The ideology of the movement is based on a slogan formulated by Count Sergey Uvarov: "Orthodoxy, Autocracy, and Nationality".

== Terminology ==
The term was intended to be pejorative in revolutionary newspapers, but adherents used it in their own literature. They traced the term back to the "black lands", where peasants, merchants, and craftsmen paid taxes to the government (compare to Black council), meanwhile lands owned by the nobility and church were called "white lands"; the term "hundred" (sotnya) was used to refer to a feudal administrative division. In their imagination, it was the loyal people of the Black Hundreds who gathered to fight Poles and traitors when it was needed.

Revolutionary newspapers identified the Black Hundreds as a threat, describing them as "hooligan gangs" paid by the government to threaten political opponents. The Menshevik leader Julius Martov feared that the government would bribe lower class individuals to act against the social revolutionaries of the time. The term "Black Hundreds" started to appear in newspapers around 1905, along with warnings that the government would mobilize the Black Hundreds in pursuit of mass murder, and would even resort to inciting anti-Jewish pogroms and strife between different religious groups. They alleged that the Black Hundreds were being organized by the police, and called for resistance. The term became more closely associated with pogrom-like violence after thousands of people were killed in attacks on demonstrations, public assemblies, and in the antisemitic pogroms that followed the October Manifesto.

== Precursors ==
- "Svjashchjennaja druzhina" (Священнaя дружинa, or the Holy Brigade) and "Russkoye sobraniye" (Русское собрание, or Russian Assembly) in Saint Petersburg are considered by the Russian historian Anatoly Stepanov to be predecessors of the Black Hundreds. Starting in 1900, the two organizations united representatives of conservative intellectuals, government officials, Russian Orthodox clergy and landowners.

A number of Black Hundred organizations formed during and after the Russian Revolution of 1905, such as:

- "Soyuz russkogo naroda" (Союз русского народа, or Union of the Russian People) in St. Petersburg,
- "Soyuz russkikh lyudey" (Союз русских людей, or Union of the Russians) in Moscow,
- "Russkaya monarkhicheskaya partiya" (Русская монархическая партия, or Russian Monarchist Party) in Moscow and elsewhere,
- "Obshchestvo aktivnoy borby s revolyutsiyey" (Общество активной борьбы с революцией, or Society of Active Struggle Against Revolution) in Moscow,
- "Belyy dvuglavyy oryol" (Белый двуглавый орёл, or White Two-headed Eagle) in Odessa,

and others.

== Ideology ==
Effective during 1905–1914, Black Hundreds didn't exist as a single movement; but as a collective of various political groups and parties with different ideological views representing, yet representing monarchist ideology in the Russian Empire. Even the concept of "Russian nation" was interpreted differently, with some seeing "Russian-ness" as a religious category, while others defined it in a civic or ethnic sense, or as their combination.

Union of the Russian People ideologist Alexander Trishatny considered Russian nation to be the combination of three main ethnic groups: "Greater Russians", Belarusians, and "Little Russians" (Ukrainians). In major urban centres Black Hundreds tended to see their nationalism in terms of political loyalty to the tsar. Among secular leaders of the Black Hundred movement there were many inorodtsy belonging to non-Slavic ethnicities, including people of German and French origin.

Ethnic Russian nationalism, in comparison, was supported by a minority of Black Hundred organizations. Its supporters had their centre in Kyiv and promoted the idea of all East Slavs comprising a single ethnic group. This could be seen as an attempt to counter the Ukrainian, Polish and Jewish national movements.

Until the early 1910s most Black Hundreds leaders saw Jews as their main enemy, but with the rise of the Ukrainian national movement their representatives started a campaign against what they saw as "Ukrainian separatism" promoted by "mazepinists", allegedly supported by Austria-Hungary and embodied in the figure of Mykhailo Hrushevsky.

Many representatives of the Black Hundreds were supporters of agrarianism.

== Support base ==
Members of the Black Hundred organizations came from different social strata—such as landowners, clergymen, the high and petty bourgeoisie, merchants, artisans, workers, and the so-called "declassed elements". The Postoyanny Sovyet Ob'yedinnyonnykh dvoryanskikh obshchestv Rossii (United Gentry Council) guided the activities of the black-hundredists; the Tsarist regime provided moral and financial support to the movement. The Black Hundreds were founded on a devotion to the Tsar, church, and motherland, expressed previously by the motto of Tsar Nicholas I: "Orthodoxy, Autocracy, and Nationality" (Pravoslaviye, Samoderzhaviye i Narodnost). The Black Hundreds conducted oral propaganda: in churches by holding special services and during meetings, lectures, and demonstrations. Such propaganda provoked antisemitic sentiments and monarchic "exaltation" and incited pogroms and terrorist acts, performed by the Black Hundreds' paramilitary groups, sometimes known as "Yellow Shirts". A leading role in the Black Hundred movement in Ukrainian lands belonged to the Orthodox Church.

== Popularity and power ==
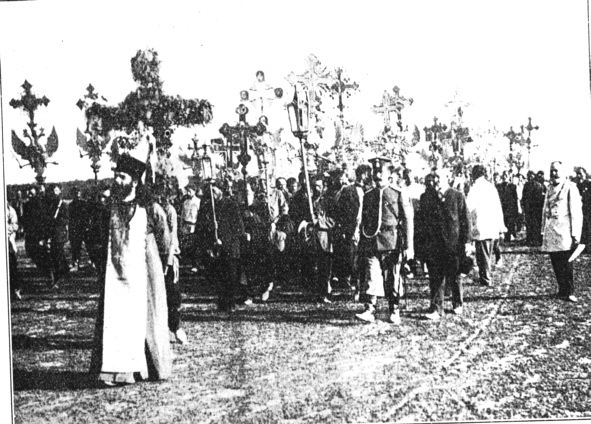
A Black Hundred procession, 1907

The Black Hundred movement published newspapers, such as Znamya (The Banner) or Russkoye znamya (Russian Banner), Pochayevsky Listok (The Pochayev Page), Zemshchina, Kolokol (Bell), Groza (Thunderstorm), Veche (Popular Assembly) and others. Many rightist newspapers, such as Moskovskiye vedomosti (Moscow News), Grazhdanin (Citizen) and Kievlyanin (Kievan), published their materials as well. Among the prominent leaders of the Black Hundred movement were Alexander Dubrovin, Vladimir Purishkevich, Nikolai Markov, A. I. Trishatny, Pavel Krushevan, Pavel Bulatsel, Ivan Vostorgov, M. K. Shakhovskoy, Saint John of Kronstadt, Hieromonk Iliodor, Bishop Hermogen, and others.

== Incitement to violence ==
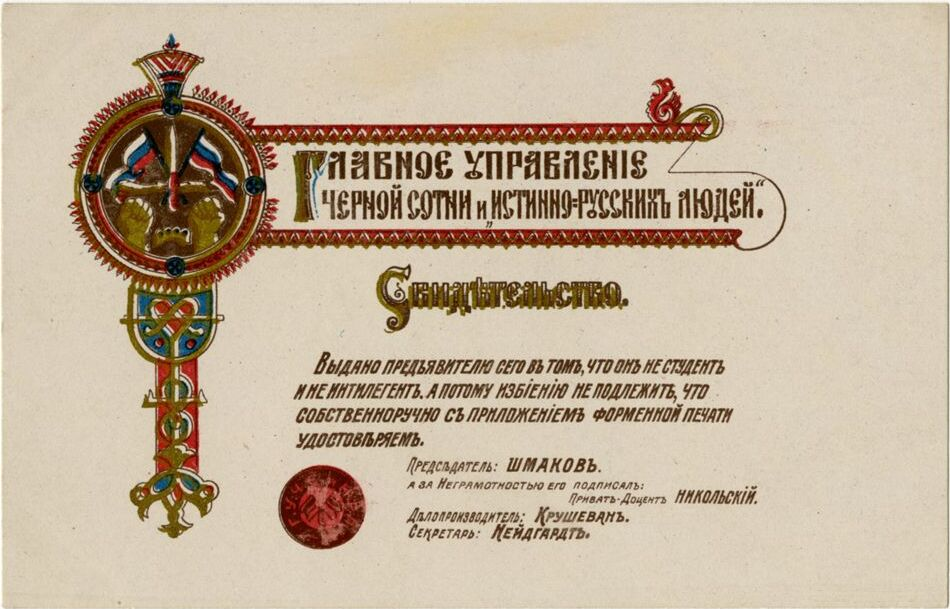
Anti-"Black Hundred" satire. A certificate: "The bearer of this document is neither a student nor a member of the intelligentsia, and is thus not fit for beating" issued by the "Chief Directorate of the Black Hundreds"

When two Duma delegates, Grigori Iollos (Poltava province) and Mikhail Herzenstein (b. 1859, d. 1906 in Terijoki), both from the Constitutional Democratic Party, were assassinated by members of the Black Hundreds, their press organ Russkoe Znamya declared openly that "Real Russians assassinated Herzenstein and Iollos with knowledge of officials", and expressed regret that "only two Jews perished in the crusade against revolutionaries." The black hundred were known to have used violence and torture on anyone they believed was a threat to the Tsar.

Members of the Black Hundreds carried out raids (with unofficial government approval) against various revolutionary groups and pogroms, including inciting pogroms against Jews.

The historian of the Black Hundred movement Sergei Stepanov, writes that after the 1905 Russian Revolution, fighting squads of the Union of the Russian People and other extremist right-wing organizations became the weapons of the Black Hundred terror.

== Fight against the Black Hundreds ==
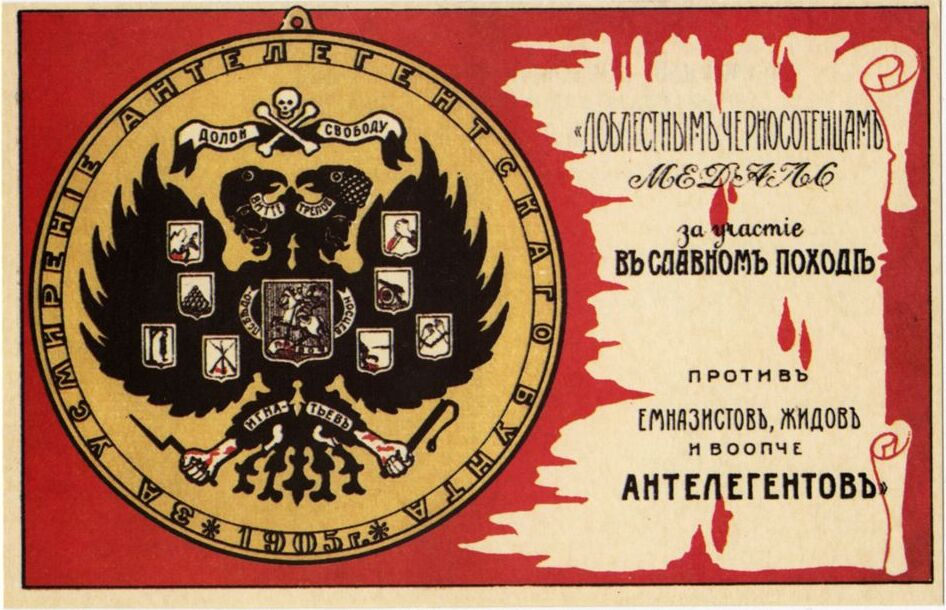
A satirical postcard from 1905 "honoring" the Black Hundreds depicts the two-headed eagle of the Romanov dynasty and a banner reading "Down with Freedom," while commemorating attacks on "high school students, Kikes, and intellectuals".

Radical socialist parties organized revolutionary terror in retaliation to the Black Hundred activities. Vladimir Lenin, leader of the Bolshevik faction of the RSDLP wrote in 1905:

The fight against the Black Hundreds is an excellent type of military action, which will train the soldiers of the revolutionary army, give them their baptism of fire, and at the same time be of tremendous benefit to the revolution. Revolutionary army groups must at once find out who organises the Black Hundreds and where and how they are organised, and then, without confining themselves to propaganda (which is useful but inadequate) they must act with armed force, beat up and kill the members of the Black-Hundred gangs, blow up their headquarters, etc., etc.

On behalf of the Saint Petersburg Committee of the RSDLP, an armed attack was carried out on the Tver tea house, where the workers of the Nevsky Shipbuilding Plant, who were members of the Union of the Russian People, gathered. First, two bombs were thrown by the Bolshevik militants, and then those who ran out of the teahouse were shot with revolvers. The Bolsheviks killed two and wounded fifteen people.

Revolutionary organizations carried out many other terrorist acts, mainly against the chairmen of local departments of the Union of the Russian People. So, according to the police department, only in March 1908 in one Chernihiv province in the city of Bakhmach, a bomb was thrown at the house of the chairman of the local union of the URP, in the city of Nizhyn the house of the chairman of the union was set on fire. The whole family died, in the village of Domyany the department's chairman was killed, two chairmen of departments were killed in Nizhyn.

The Socialist-Revolutionaries also killed prominent Black Hundreds such as Nikolai Bogdanovich and Gavril Luzhenovsky.

== Black Hundreds and the Ukrainian question ==
The Black Hundreds classified Ukrainians as Russians, and attracted the support of many Russophiles who considered themselves Russian and rejected Ukrainian nationalism and a Ukrainian identity. The Black Hundred movement actively campaigned against what it considered to be Ukrainian separatism, as well as against promoting Ukrainian culture and language in general, and against the works of Ukrainian poet Taras Shevchenko, in particular. In Odessa, the Black Hundreds shut down the local branch of the Ukrainian Prosvita society, which was dedicated to spreading literacy in the Ukrainian language and Ukrainian cultural awareness.

According to Klymentiy Fedevych, Black Hundreds and the wider monarchist movement in the Ukrainian lands of the Russian Empire had their own local specifics. Although their supporters from among ethnic Ukrainians were loyal to the tsar, this didn't contradict to their distinct identity as "Little Russians" and a sense of local patriotism. They tended to oppose ethnic Russification and frequently used the terms "Ukraine" and "Ukrainian" in their publications. In most cases, Black Hundreds in Ukraine tended to view Ukrainians ("Little Russians") as a separate ethnic group, distinct from "Greater Russians" and "White Russians", but united with them into a single Triune Russian nation. Moreover, their populist rhetorics had many common points with the programs of Ukrainian national-democratic movement.

These tendencies were especially widespread in Polish-Ukrainian border regions such as Volhynia, where the monarchist movement was the most popular political force among ethnic Ukrainians. Representatives of the Union of the Russian People in Ukrainian lands, such as Volhynian archbishop Antony Khrapovitsky, actively used elements and symbols of the Ukrainian national movement in their activities. In order to achieve more influence on the local population, supporters of the Black Hundreds among the clergy promoted the translation of the Gospel into Ukrainian, supported the publications of Ukrainian-language sermons and other literature, and even made attempts to introduce religious services in Ukrainian. In 1912 Nikon, bishop of Kremenets and one of the leaders of the Union of the Russian People in the State Duma, introduced a bill which would allow Ukrainian as a language of school instruction and support the studies of Ukrainian history in schools.

A number of Ukrainian political figures, most prominently Mykhailo Hrushevsky, recognized the Ukrainian adherents of Black Hundreds as part of the broader Ukrainian political movement representing its right wing, and made calls for cooperation with them. In Podolia many members of the monarchist movement from among the clergy simultaneously participated the Ukrainian national movement, with the local Orthodox bishop supporting both Prosvita and the Union of the Russian People. Activities of the Volhynian branch of Union of the Russian People in promoting the memorialization of Ukrainian history were positively evaluated by Dmytro Doroshenko, Ivan Ohienko and Olena Pchilka.

In 1909 the idea of the establishment of Kholm Governorate, which was promoted by Orthodox archbishop and notable monarchist Eulogius Georgiyevsky, found the support of progressive Ukrainian activists including Oleksander Lototsky, who saw it as a way to evade Polonization of local Ukrainians. In early 1914 Ukrainian Rada newspaper described members of Kyiv's Black Hundreds as "not alien to the Ukrainian movement" and praised them for recognizing the poetic talent of Taras Shevchenko and Ivan Kotliarevsky. Throughout the existence of the Black Hundred movement in Ukraine, Russian ethnic nationalists remained a minority in its ranks. After the fall of Russian monarchy in 1917, many Ukrainians who had formerly supported the Black Hundreds and used to sympathize with the Russian monarchy, adopted a purely Ukrainian identity. As a result, the lands of Western Volhynia, which had demonstrated the highest degree of support for the Black Hundreds before 1917, became the cradle of the Ukrainian Insurgent Army during the 1940s.

== All-Russian congresses ==
The Black Hundreds organized four all-Russian congresses to unite their forces. In October 1906, they elected the so-called glavnaya uprava (a kind of board of directors) of the new all-Russian Black Hundred organization "Ob’yedinyonniy russkiy narod" (Объединённый русский народ, or Russian People United). After 1907, however, this organization disintegrated, and the whole Black Hundreds movement became weaker as the membership rate steadily declined. After the February Revolution 1917, the remaining Black Hundred organizations were officially abolished.

After emigrating abroad, many Black Hundreds were among the main critics of the White movement. They blamed the movement for not only failing to stress monarchism as its key ideological foundation but also supposedly being run under the influence of classical liberals and Freemasons. Boris Brasol (1885–1963), a former member of the Black Hundreds, was among those who later emigrated to the United States. There he befriended industrialist Henry Ford, who gave Brasol a job on The Dearborn Independent newspaper. Brasol also helped in the production of anti-Jewish propaganda such as The International Jew.

== Modern version ==
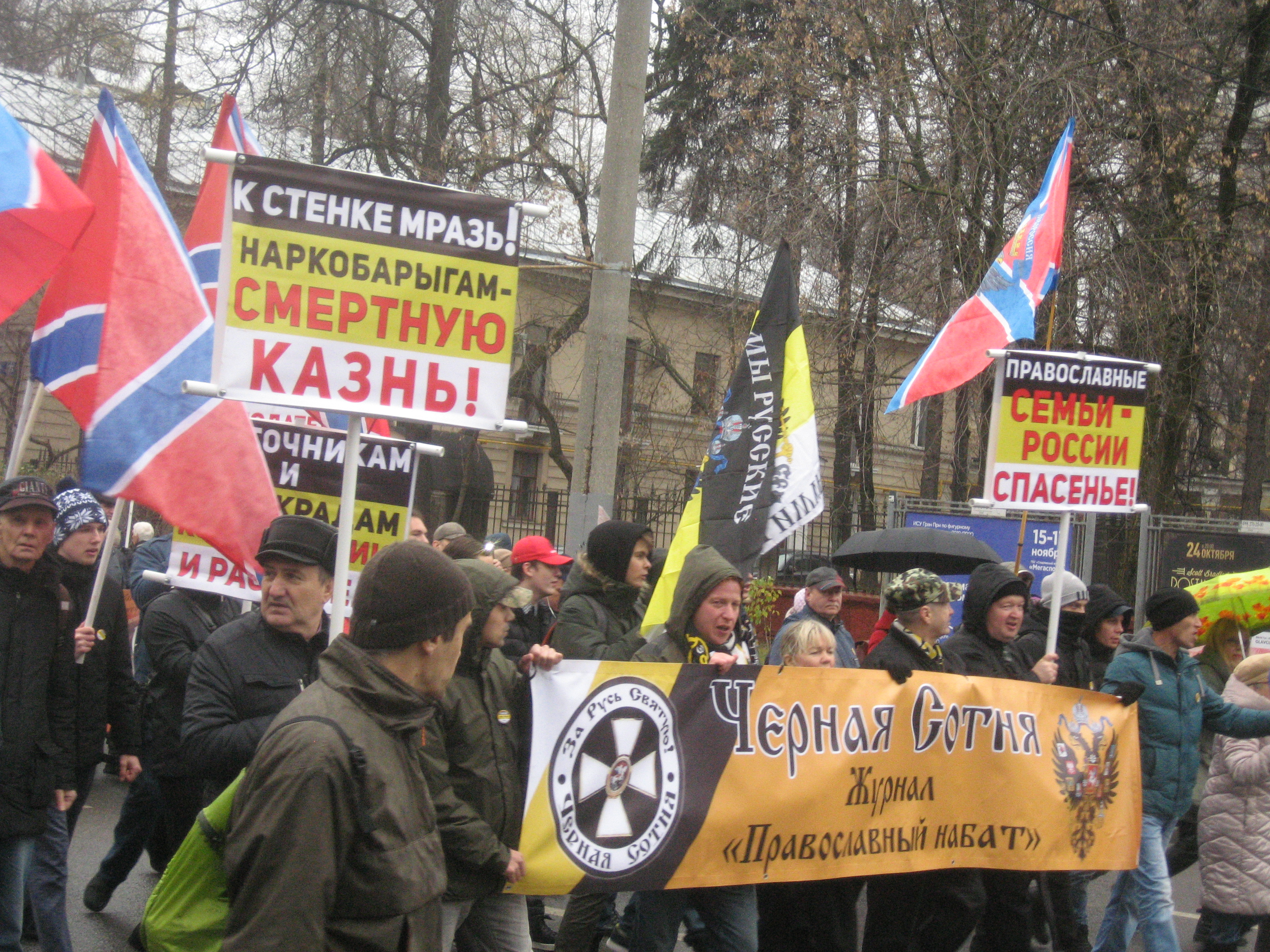
Black Hundreds during the 2019 Russian March

Modern flag of the Black Hundreds

After the fall of the Soviet Union, the nationalist and monarchist movements were reborn in Russian society. In 1992, Alexander Shtilmark (former member of Pamyat) decided to found a modern Black Hundred movement.

The movement maintains contacts with other Russian nationalist organizations (like the Russian Imperial Movement and the Union of Orthodox Banner-Bearers) and also participated in the early stages of the Russo-Ukrainian War on the side of pro-Russian separatists.
