= Alexander Dubrovin =

Russian far-right politician (1855–1921)

Dr. Alexander Dubrovin
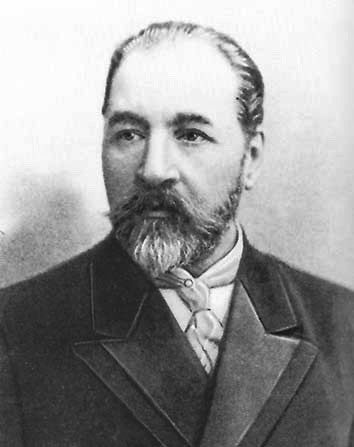
- Born: Дубровин, Александр Иванович; April 7, 1855; Kamyshlov, Perm Governorate, Russian Empire
- Disappeared: after April 29, 1921; Moscow, Russia
- Status: Mentioned as alive in 1929
- Body discovered: No
- Style: Monarchism, antisemitism
- Political party: Union of Russian People
- Criminal charges: organization of pogroms, murders in 1905–17

Alexander Ivanovich Dubrovin (Russian: Алекса́ндр Ива́нович Дубро́вин; April 7, 1855 – disappeared after 1921) was a Russian far-right politician and a leader of the Union of the Russian People (URP).

== Biography ==
According to refined data, Dubrovin was born on April 7, 1855 in Kamyshlov, Perm Governorate (now Sverdlovsk Oblast) and was baptized according to the Russian Orthodox rite in the local Cathedral of the Intercession of Our Lady. However, before the publication of this information by Andrey Ivanov in 2024, it was believed that he was born in Kungur. His father was collegiate secretary Ivan Stefanovich Dubrovin, and his mother was Glafira Ivanovna Dubrovina. Orphaned at an early age, having lost both his mother and father.

A trained doctor, Dubrovin gave up his practice to concentrate on opposing what he saw as creeping liberalism in the Russian aristocracy, turning his own movement, the Russian Assembly, over to the newly formed URP in 1905, when he was appointed head of the new group's directorate. Both anti-Semitic and anti-Masonic he believed in the Zhidomasonstvo (Judeo-Masonic) conspiracy and took the lead in organising the pogroms of the Black Hundreds.

Gaining a popular following amongst the peasants, petite bourgeoisie and lumpenproletariat for his demagogy, Dubrovin sat in the State Duma of the Russian Empire despite being a firm believer in absolutism and before organising a failed boycott of the Third Duma in 1907. Closely involved in the trial of Menahem Mendel Beilis, as later described in Bernard Malamud's novel The Fixer, Dubrovin himself fell foul of the law when his tendency towards violence saw him indicted for the murder of a fellow Duma member.

In the URP, Dubrovin was the leader of an extreme faction based around the Russkoe znamya newspaper and in 1910, that became the base of his support when the majority faction of the URP fell under Nikolai Markov. With Dubrovin somewhat lacking in charisma and seen as somewhat unbalanced, his faction fell into insignificance.

== Death controversy ==
According to Philip Rees Dubrovin was shot in 1918 for his activities against the October Revolution. A number of other sources however place Dubrovin alive after this date and his actual date of death remains unresolved. On October 21, 1920 Dubrovin was arrested in Moscow by Cheka. He was charged as an organizer of pogroms, murders etc. in 1905—1917 when he was the chairman of URP. In their entirety these corpus delicti (components of crime) were qualified under the Criminal Code Article "the counter-revolutionary activity".

According to multiple Russian sources, since December 12, 1917, Dubrovin lived in Moscow and worked as a doctor in the 1st Lefortovo Soviet ambulance station. He was arrested by the All-Russian Extraordinary Commission (Cheka) on October 21, 1920. The documents of the case indicate that Dubrovin “from 1905 to 1917 was the chairman of the "Union of the Russian People", which fought against the liberation movement in Russia. On October 30, 1920, the accusation of counter-revolution was added to this and Dubrovin was personally interrogated by members of the Presidium of the Cheka Vyacheslav Menzhinsky, Martin Latsis and secretary B.M. Futoryan.

On November 1, 1920, the Special Department of the Cheka issued a conclusion that "the charge of Dr. Dubrovin Alexander Ivanovich in the organization before the revolution, is of murders, pogroms, insinuations, forgeries, striving with all their activities to strangle the liberation of Russia is proven" and the case was transferred to the Collegium of the Cheka with the proposal "the chairman of the Union of the Russian People AI Dubrovin - to be shot". On December 29, 1920, he was sentenced to be shot by the Presidium of the Cheka by being "convicted of organizing murders and pogroms". However, the exact date of execution is not known.

Dubrovin’s files at FSB archives keep two consecutive death sentences dated December 29, 1920 and April 21, 1921 which indicates that at least one time Dubrovin's appeal for amnesty was satisfied. No documental traces of the actual implementation of this sentence were found. Meanwhile, according to the Small Soviet Encyclopedia published in 1929, Dubrovin was still alive by that date.

== See also ==
- List of people who disappeared

== Sources ==
- Репников А. В. (2007). "Мы все уничтожены, мы фактически разгромлены…" (русские монархисты накануне и после падения самодержавия) ["…" (russian monarchists before and after the fall of the autocracy)] (PDF). Известия высших учебных заведений. Поволжский регион. Гуманитарные науки. История (in Russian). Vol. 2. Archived from the original (PDF) on 2011-08-18.
- Макаров В. Г. (публ.) (2005). Следственное дело доктора Дубровина [Investigation in Dr. Dubrovin case]. Архив еврейской истории (in Russian). Vol. 2. ISBN 9785824307412.
- Иванов, Андрей (2024). "Доктор Дубровин: новые факты биографии и оценки современников" (PDF). Новейшая история России (in Russian). 14 (4): 884–904.
