= Mikhail Herzenstein =

Russian politician (1859–1906)

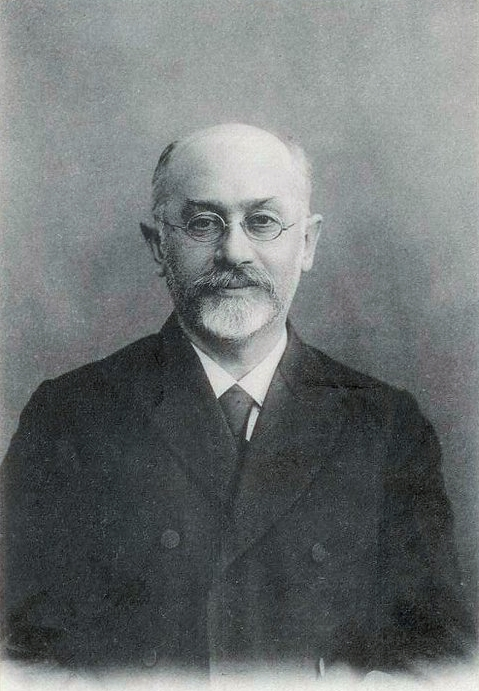
Mikhail Herzenstein

Mikhail Yakovlevich Herzenstein (Russian: Михаи́л Я́ковлевич Герценште́йн; April 30 [O.S. 18] 1859, Voznesensk, Russian Empire — July 31 [O.S. 18] 1906, Terijoki, Grand Duchy of Finland, Russian Empire) was a Russian-Jewish scientist and politician who converted to Christianity, elected for the Constitutional Democratic Party to the First State Duma of the Russian Empire, representing the city of Moscow. He was assassinated before the end of his parliamentary mandate by the Black Hundreds, a reactionary antisemitic terrorist group at his summer home in Terijoki in the Grand Duchy of Finland.
