= Vladimir Purishkevich =

Russian far-right politician (1870–1920)

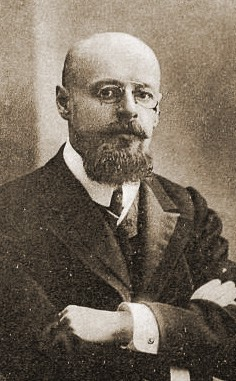
- Born: 24 August [O.S. 12 August] 1870; Kishinev, Russian Empire
- Died: 1 February 1920 (aged 49); Novorossiysk, White-controlled South Russia
- Education: Imperial Novorossiya University
- Political party: Russian Assembly
- Other political affiliations: Union of the Russian People; Michael the Archangel Russian People's Union
- Awards: Order of Saint Stanislaus; Order of Saint Vladimir

Vladimir Mitrofanovich Purishkevich (Russian: Влади́мир Митрофа́нович Пуришке́вич, [pʊrʲɪˈʂkʲevʲɪt͡ɕ]; 24 August [O.S. 12 August] 1870 – 1 February 1920) was a Russian politician and right-wing extremist known for his monarchist, ultra-nationalist, antisemitic and anticommunist views. He helped lead the paramilitary Black Hundreds during the Russian Revolution of 1905. He later served in the State Duma, where he gained a reputation for courting of public controversy. Together with Felix Yusupov and Dmitri Pavlovich he took part in the assassination of Grigori Rasputin in late 1916.

After the February Revolution, Purishkevich was one of the only leaders of the Black Hundreds to remain politically active. He eventually joined the White movement and died from typhus in 1920.

== Biography ==
=== Early career ===
Born as the son of a poor nobleman in Kishinev, Bessarabia (now Moldova), Purishkevich graduated from the Imperial Novorossiya University with a degree in classical philology. Around 1900, he moved to Saint Petersburg. He became a member of the Russian Assembly group and was appointed under Vyacheslav von Plehve.

Purishkevich was a hardline supporter of Russification and sacerdotal autocracy. Purishkevich was hostile towards Jews, who he believed to be the "vanguard of the revolutionary movement". He wanted Jews to be deported to Kolyma. He believed that the "Kadets, socialists, the intelligentsia, the press and councils of university professors" were all under the control of Jews.

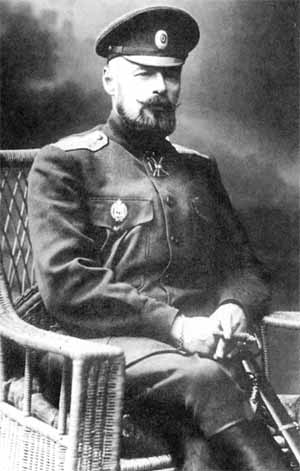
Vladimir Purishkevich during World War I

During the Russian Revolution of 1905, Purishkevich helped organise the Black Hundreds, a reactionary, monarchist and ultra-nationalist militia that carried out a number of raids (with unofficial government approval) against revolutionary groups as well as pogroms against Jews. After the October Manifesto created the State Duma, he was elected as a deputy for the Bessarabian and Kursk province. He became one of the founders of the Union of the Russian People and served as its deputy chairman until 1907, when he split to form the Union of the Archangel Michael. In the Duma, he gained fame and infamy for his flamboyant speeches and scandalous behaviour, such as speaking on International Workers' Day with a red carnation in his fly.

When the first Russian women's congress convened in 1908, Purishkevich sent a letter to several of the participants calling it "an assembly of whores". One of the recipients of the letter, Anna Filosofova, made the letter public and took Purishkevich to court; he was sentenced to one month in jail.

=== Criticism of Rasputin ===
During World War I, Purishkevich became critical of the performance of the government, although not of the tsar himself; he saw the rise of pro-Russian sentiment during the war as a popular expression of support for the tsar. Purishkevich was particularly critical of the roles of Empress Alexandra and her close advisor Grigori Rasputin. On 3 November 1916, Purishkevich went to Mogilev and talked with Tsar Nicolas II about Rasputin.

On 19 November, Purishkevich delivered a speech in the Duma that denounced Rasputin and the conduct of the government. He compared Rasputin with the "False Dmitri", and argued that Rasputin's influence over the tsarina had made him a threat to the empire. He stated that the monarchy was becoming discredited:

The Tsar's ministers who have been turned into marionettes, marionettes whose threads have been taken firmly in hand by Rasputin and the Empress Alexandra Fyodorovna—the evil genius of Russia and the Tsarina... who has remained a German on the Russian throne and alien to the country and its people.

He concluded that "While Rasputin is alive, we cannot win".

=== Killing of Rasputin ===
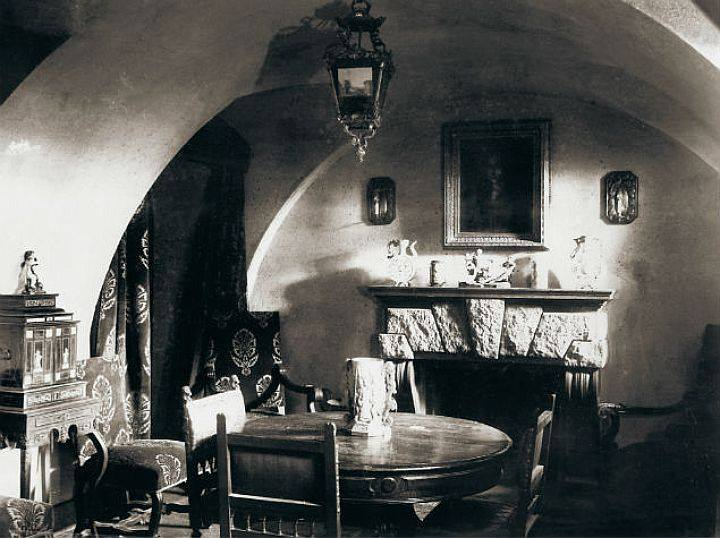
Basement of the Yusupov Palace on the Moika in St. Petersburg where Rasputin was murdered

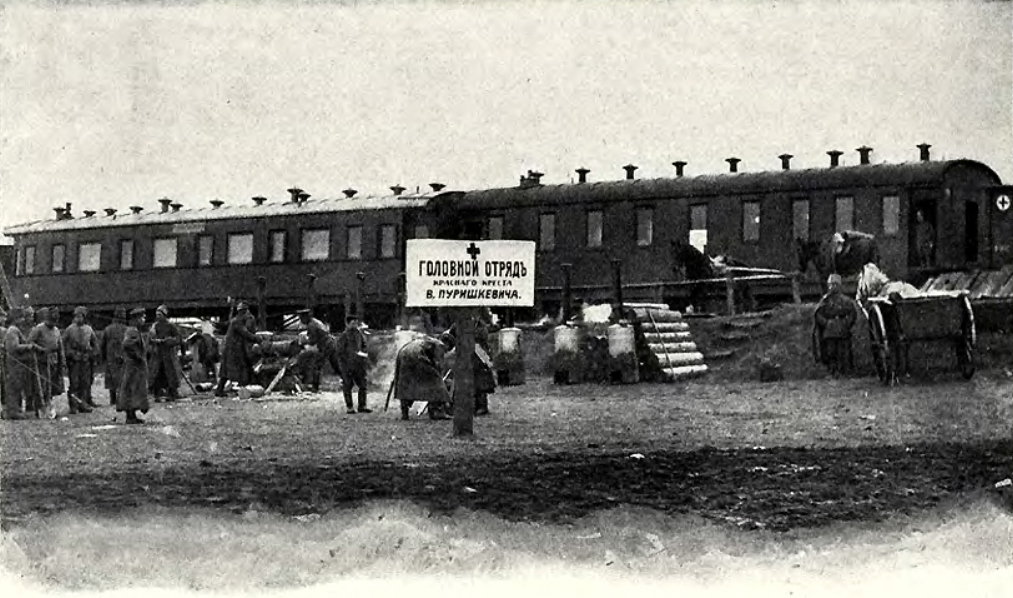
Purishkevich' medical aid train in 1916

Prince Felix Yusupov was impressed by Purishkevich's speech criticizing Rasputin. He visited Purishkevich, who quickly agreed to participate in the killing of Rasputin. Also, Grand Duke Dmitri Pavlovich joined the conspiracy. Purishkevich talked to Samuel Hoare, the head of the British Secret Intelligence Service in Petrograd.

On the evening of 16 December 1916, the conspirators gathered in the Moika Palace and eventually killed Rasputin.

A curious policeman on duty on the other side of the Moika had heard the shots, rang at the door, and was sent away. Half an hour later, another policeman arrived, and Purishkevich invited him into the palace. Purishkevich told him that he had shot Rasputin and asked him to keep it quiet for the sake of the tsar.

They had planned to burn Rasputin's possessions. Sukhotin put on Rasputin's fur coat, rubber boots, and gloves. He left with Dmitri and Dr. Lazovert in Purishkevich's car, which suggests that Rasputin had left the palace alive. Because Purishkevich's wife refused to burn the fur coat and the boots in her small fireplace in the ambulance train, the conspirators went back to the palace with the larger items.

Yusupov and Dmitri were placed under house arrest in the Sergei Palace. The tsarina had refused to meet them but said that they could explain to her what had happened in a letter. Purishkevich assisted them and left the city to the Romanian front at ten in the evening. Because of his popularity, Purishkevich was neither punished nor exiled.

=== Revolutionary Russia ===
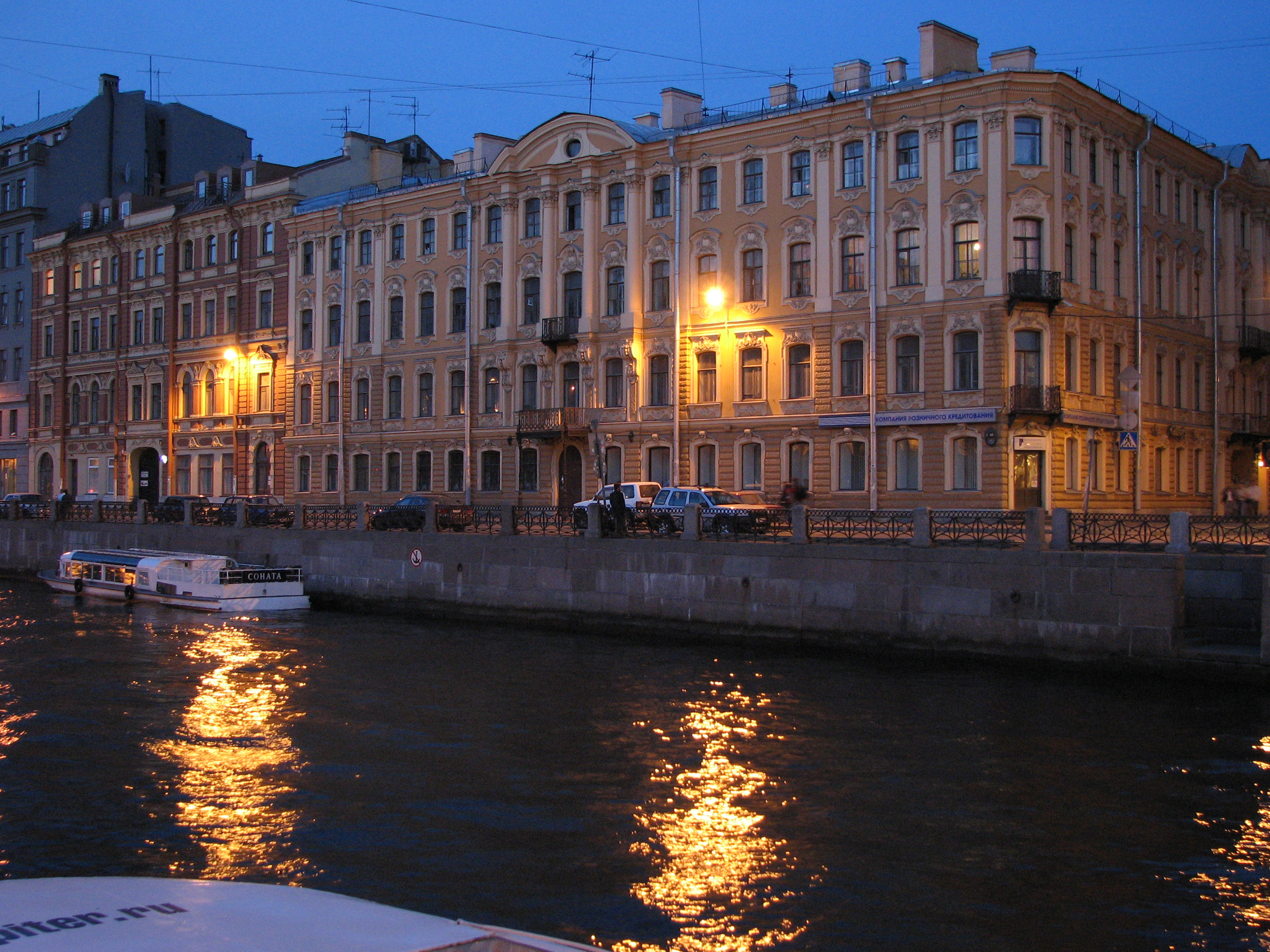
Moika Embankment with the former hotel "Russia"

During the February Revolution in 1917, many right-wingers were arrested but Purishkevich was tolerated by the government and so was "virtually the only former national Black Hundred leader to maintain an active political life in Russia after the tsar's downfall". However, the revolution meant that Purishkevich initially had to moderate his politics. He called for the abolition of the Soviets, who were, in turn, calling for the abolition of the Duma.

In August 1917, he wanted a military dictatorship; he was arrested over the Kornilov Affair but was released. Following the failure of the putsch, he collaborated with Fyodor Viktorovich Vinberg in forming an underground monarchist organisation. During the October Revolution, he organized the "Committee for the Motherland's Salvation". He was joined by a number of officers, military cadets, and others.

At the time, Purishkevich was living in the Hotel Russia at Moika 60. He had a false passport under the surname "Yevreinov". On 18 November 1917, Purishkevich was arrested by the Red Guards for his participation in a counterrevolutionary conspiracy after the discovery of a letter sent by him to General Aleksei Maksimovich Kaledin in which he urged the Cossack leader to come and restore order in Petrograd. He became the first person to be tried in the Smolny Institute by the first Revolutionary Tribunal. He was condemned to eleven months of 'public work' and four years of imprisonment with obligatory community service and won the admiration of his fellow prisoners in the Fortress of St Peter and St Paul by his courageous bearing. He was given an amnesty on May 1 after the mediation of Felix Dzerzhinsky and Nikolay Krestinsky, as he refrained from any political activity. In jail, he had written a poem describing the Treaty of Brest-Litovsk as 'The Trotsky Peace'.

=== White Russia ===
After his release, during the Russian Civil War he moved to White Army-controlled Southern Russia. There, he published the monarchist journal Blagovest and returned openly to his traditional political stance of support for the monarchy, a unified Russia, and opposition to the Jews. In some of the towns occupied by the Volunteer Army, he gave lectures in which he denounced the British policy towards Russia. In 1918, he formed a new political party, the People's State Party, and called for an "open fight against Jewry"; the party collapsed after his death.

Vladimir Purishkevich died from typhus that raged Novorossiysk in 1920, just before the final evacuation of Denikin's Army.

== Reputation ==
Purishkevich was described by contemporary Russian politician Vladimir Kokovtsov as a charming, unstable man who could not stay a single minute in one place. In 1925, Soviet writer Liubosh described Purishkevich as the 'first' fascist. He was subsequently referred to as a "leader of early Russian fascism" by Semyon Reznik, who also claimed that Purishkevich participated in numerous pogroms and was a significant proponent of the blood libel against Jews.

== Sources ==
- Vladimir Pourichkevitch (1924) Comment j'ai tué Raspoutine. Pages de Journal. J. Povolozky & Cie. Paris. Translated and published as The murder of Rasputin (1985) Ardis.
