= Shchigrovsky Uyezd =

Shchigrovsky Uyezd (Щигро́вский уе́зд) was one of the subdivisions of the Kursk Governorate of the Russian Empire. It was situated in the northeastern part of the governorate. Its administrative centre was Shchigry.

== Demographics ==
At the time of the Russian Empire Census of 1897, Shchigrovsky Uyezd had a population of 150,030. Of these, 99.8% spoke Russian, 0.1% Ukrainian and 0.1% Yiddish as their native language.
