= Oleg Platonov =

Russian Holocaust denier (born 1950)

Oleg Anatolyevich Platonov (Russian: Оле́г Анато́льевич Плато́нов; born 11 January 1950) is a Russian ultranationalist writer and Holocaust denier. He is the Director General of the Institute for the History of Russian Civilization, a Moscow-based think tank. He is known for promoting the antisemitic conspiracy theory Judeo-Bolshevism, which claims that Jews were responsible for the Russian Revolution.

== Biography ==
Platonov was born in Yekaterinburg, Russia, then known as Sverdlovsk. In 1972 he graduated from Moscow College of Consumer Cooperation. He worked in the international department of TsSU and, since 1977, in the Institute for Labor. In 1995 he organized a research institution Russian Civilization. He lived for seven months in the United States then returned to Russia. He published the encyclopedic dictionary Holy Rus and four volumes of The Great Encyclopedia of Russian People (out of a proposed twenty volumes), in which he praises the civilization of "Holy Rus'″ which, however, he claims has been undermined since the 17th century by various foreign elements ("чужебесия″) - forerunners of "Jewish-Masonic plotters" which he claims organized the Bolshevik Revolution.

Although Platonov holds the Bolshevik regime responsible for 87 million lives, he argues Joseph Stalin made "the first step toward the salvation of Russia from Jewish Bolshevism.″

Since 2003, Platonov's encyclopedia publishing center was transformed into the independent think tank 'Institute for the History of Russian Civilization' (short name 'Russian Institute'), whose goal is stated as research and dissemination of the ideas of Metropolitan Ioann of St Petersburg and Ladoga (né Ivan Snychev; 1927–1995) with Platonov as the Institute's Director General.

In his work The History of the Russian People in the Twentieth Century, Platonov treats the February and October revolutions of 1917 as handiwork of Judæo-Masonic conspirators, the agents of the Entente and of the German Empire. Similarly, he regards the leaders of Ukrainian and Baltic independence movements as spies and German agents.

== Holocaust denial ==
A publisher of the works of other Holocaust deniers, Platonov was described in 2009 as "the leading backer of Holocaust denial in Russia" by the historian Stephen E. Atkins. Platonov was on the editorial advisory board of the denialist Journal of Historical Review before it closed in 2002, according to Atkins.

== Reception ==
The Russian human rights activist Alexander Brod, writer and historian Semyon Reznik, and the Federation of Jewish Communities of Russia regard Platonov's works as antisemitic. Reznik also notes that Platonov is one of the main promoters of the blood libel.

== Works ==
- Russia's Crown of Thorns: The Secret History of Freemasonry 1731-1996 (Moscow, 1996)
- Еврейский вопрос в России (The Jewish Question in Russia; Moscow: Presskom, 2005); ISBN 5-98083-042-1
- Why America is dying (Почему Погибнет Америка; Moscow, 2008); ISBN 978-5-98132-125-2
- Святая Русь и окаянная нерусь. Русская цивилизация против мирового зла, ISBN 5926501830 (2005)

== See also ==
- Historical revisionism
- Holocaust denial
