= John Klier =

American historian (1944–2007)

- Born: Bellefonte, Pennsylvania
- Spouse: Helen Mingay

Academic background
- Education: Notre Dame University, University of Illinois

John Klier, (13 December 1944 – 23 September 2007) was a British-American historian of Russian Jewry and a pivotal figure in academic Jewish studies and East European history in the UK and beyond. At the end of his career and life, Klier was the Sidney and Elizabeth Corob Professor of Modern Jewish History at University College London. He was a historian who challenged scholarly opinion on the Jewish community under the Tsars.

== Early life and university ==
Klier was born on 13 December 1944 in Bellefonte, Pennsylvania, USA, and his family lived briefly in Washington before settling in Syracuse, New York. His father taught aeronautical engineering at Syracuse University. Brought up as a Catholic, John attended Notre Dame University in South Bend, Indiana for his BA and MA in history. He pursued doctoral study at the University of Illinois, which was known for Russian and Soviet history. In his investigations of pre-revolutionary Russia, he noticed that little research had been conducted on Russian Jewry for most of the 20th century. His PhD dissertation examined the process by which the Russian Empire, after the partitions of Poland in the late 18th century, absorbed Jews into the Russian state system. His first book, Russia Gathers Her Jews: The Origins of the Jewish Question in Russia (1986), expanded on the PhD thesis.

== Work in Belarus, Russia and Ukraine ==
In 1991, he was one of the first foreign scholars to undertake in-depth research on the Jews in Soviet archives and mined resources in the coming years in Kyiv, Moscow, St Petersburg and Minsk. In 1993, he received a grant from the National Endowment for the Humanities of the United States government to prepare surveys of Jewish materials in post-Soviet archives. His second major monograph, "Imperial Russia's Jewish Question, 1855–1881", appeared in 1995.

== At UCL ==
Klier headed the Hebrew and Jewish Studies department at UCL during much of the 1990s until his death. The John Klier Memorial Library is maintained at the department in his memory. Klier was an editor of East European Jewish Affairs, a member of the Academic Council of the International Center for Russian and East European Jewish Studies in Moscow and of the Institute for Polish-Jewish Studies.

== Personal life ==
Klier was devoted to his wife, Helen Mingay and their two children Sophia and Sebastian. He died of cancer at the age of 62 and is survived by family members in Upstate New York and the UK. Klier was an expert in many national literatures – which he preferred to read in their original language. He was also a skilled fencer.

== Bibliography ==
- Perspectives on the 1881-1882 pogroms in Russia. Pittsburgh, Forbes Quadrangle, 1984, with Alexander Orbach.
- Russia gathers her Jews: The origins of the "Jewish question" in Russia, 1772-1825. Northern Illinois University Press, 1986.
- Pogroms: anti-Jewish violence in modern Russian history, with Shlomo Lambroza, 1992.
- Imperial Russia's Jewish question, 1855-1881. Cambridge and New York, Cambridge University Press, 1995.
- The quest for Anastasia: Solving the mystery of the lost Romanovs. Secaucus, N.J., Carol Publishing Group, 1997, with his wife Helen Mingay.
- Russians, Jews, and the Pogroms of 1881-1882. Cambridge and New York, Cambridge University Press, 2011.
