= Glagolev =

Glagolev (masculine, Russian: Глаголев) or Glagoleva (feminine, Russian: Глаголева) is a Russian surname. Notable people with the surname include:

- Aleksandr Glagolev (1872–1937), Russian Orthodox priest
- Alexandra Glagoleva-Arkadieva (1884–1945), Soviet–Russian physicist
- Aleksei Glagolev (1901–1972), Ukrainian Orthodox priest
- E. G. Glagoleva (1926–2015), Soviet–Russian mathematician
- Vasily Glagolev (1896–1947), Soviet general
- Vasily Glagolev (1883–1938), Soviet military commander
- Vera Glagoleva (1956–2017), Soviet–Russian actress and film director
