= Menahem Mendel Beilis =

Russian Jew accused of ritual murder (1874–1934)

- מנחם מענדל בייליס
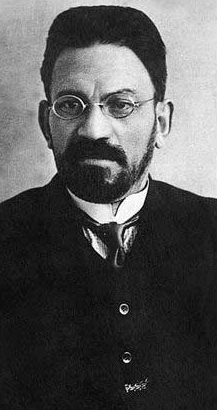
- Portrait of Beilis after his arrest in 1911
- Born: 1874; Kiev, Russian Empire
- Died: July 7, 1934 (aged 59–60); Saratoga Springs, New York, U.S.
- Resting place: Mount Carmel Cemetery, Glendale, New York
- Criminal charge: Ritual murder

Menahem Mendel Beilis (Note: Yiddish: מנחם מענדל בייליס; Russian: Менахем Мендель Бейлис, romanized: Menakhem Mendel Beylis) (1874 – July 7, 1934; sometimes spelled Beiliss) was a Russian Jew accused of ritual murder in Kiev in a notorious 1913 trial, known as the "Beilis trial" or the "Beilis affair". Although Beilis was eventually acquitted after a lengthy process, the legal process sparked international criticism of antisemitism in the Russian Empire.

Beilis' story was fictionalized in Bernard Malamud's 1966 novel The Fixer, which won the Pulitzer Prize for Fiction and the U.S. National Book Award for Fiction. Maurice Samuel's book Blood Accusation: the Strange Case of the Beilis Trial, a non-fiction account, was published by Alfred A. Knopf the same year.

== Biography ==
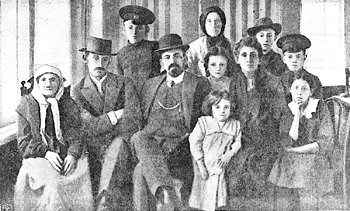
Beilis with his family

Menahem Mendel Beilis was born into a Hasidic family. In 1911, he was an ex-soldier and the father of five children. He was employed as a superintendent at the Zaitsev brick factory in Kiev.

== Murder of Andriy Yushchinskyi ==
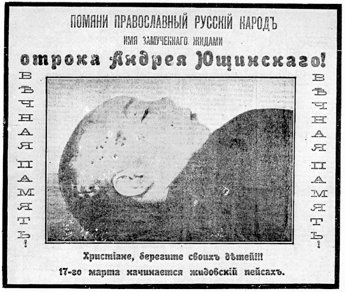
An antisemitic flier distributed in Kiev before the Beilis Trial. The caption reads "Orthodox Russian people, commemorate the name of the youth Andriy Yushchinskyi who was martyred by Zhids! Memory eternal to him! Christians, guard your children!!! On March 17, the passover of the Zhids [an ethnic slur for Jews] begins."

On March 12, 1911, a 13-year-old boy named Andriy Yushchinskyi disappeared on his way to school. Eight days later, his mutilated body was discovered in a cave near the Zaitsev brick factory. Beilis was arrested on July 21, 1911, after a lamplighter testified that the boy had been kidnapped by a Jew. A report submitted to Tsar Nicholas II by the judiciary named Beilis as the murderer.

Beilis spent over two years in prison awaiting trial. Meanwhile, an antisemitic campaign was launched in the Russian press against the Jewish community, with accusations of ritual murder. Among those who wrote or spoke against these false accusations were Maxim Gorky, Vladimir Korolenko, Alexander Blok, Alexander Kuprin, Vladimir Vernadsky, Mykhailo Hrushevskyi and Pavel Milyukov.

Beilis had been in prison for over a year when a delegation led by a military officer came to his cell. In what might have been a ploy to get Beilis to incriminate himself or other Jews, the officer informed Beilis that he would soon be freed due to a manifesto pardoning all katorzhniks (convicts at hard labor) on the tercentenary jubilee of the reign of the Romanov dynasty. As related in his memoir, Beilis refused this overture:

“That manifesto,” said I, “will be for katorzhniks, not for me. I need no manifesto, I need a fair trial.”
“If you will be ordered to be released, you'll have to go.”
“No – even if you open the doors of the prison, and threaten me with shooting, I shall not leave. I shall not go without a trial.”

This is one of many incidents from Beilis' memoir that Bernard Malamud incorporated in his novel The Fixer.

== The trial ==
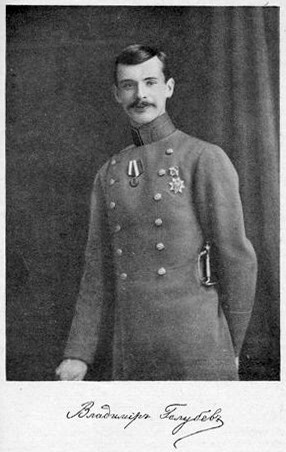
Student Vladimir Golubev, leader of Two-Headed Eagle, who fabricated the accusation against Beilis

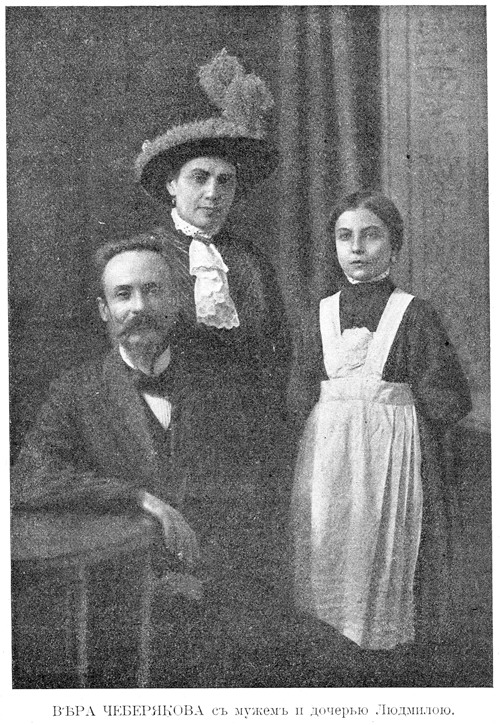
Vera Cheberyak with her husband Vasily and daughter Lyudmila (all three were prosecution witnesses at the trial)

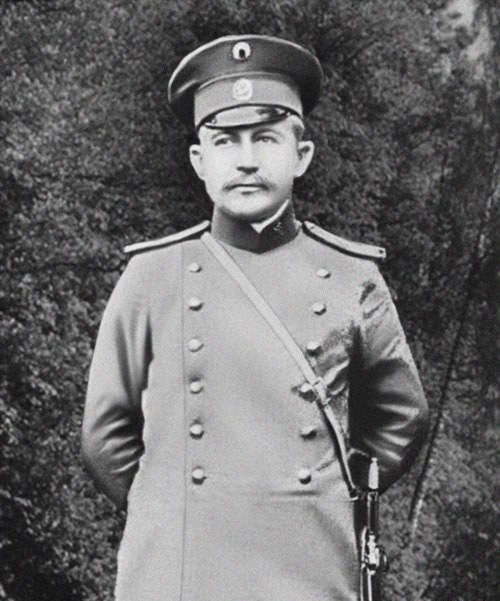
Nikolai Krasovsky, a detective who discovered the real murderers of Yushchinskyi

The Beilis trial took place in Kiev from September 25 through October 28, 1913. The prosecution was composed of the government's best lawyers. Professor Ivan A. Sikorsky of Saint Vladimir Imperial University of Kiev (father of helicopter pioneer Igor Sikorsky), a medical psychologist, testified as an expert witness for the prosecution that in his opinion it was a case of ritual murder.

Beilis had a strong alibi due to the fact that he worked on the Jewish Sabbath. Yushchinskyi was abducted on a Saturday morning, when Beilis was at work, as confirmed by his Gentile co-workers. Receipt slips for a shipment of bricks signed by Beilis that morning were produced as evidence. The prosecution argued that Beilis could have gone out for a few minutes, kidnapped Yushchinskyi, and then returned to work.

Internal police documents from 1912 subsequently revealed that the weakness of the case was known.

=== Prosecution expert ===
One prosecution witness, presented as an expert in Judaic rituals, was a Lithuanian Catholic priest, Justinas Pranaitis from Tashkent, well known for his antisemitic 1892 work Talmud Unmasked. Pranaitis testified that the murder of Yushchinskyi was a religious ritual. One police department official is quoted as saying:

The course of the trial will depend on how the ignorant jury will perceive arguments of priest Pranaitis, who is sure about the reality of ritual murders. I think, as a priest he is able to talk with peasants and to convince them. As a scientist, who defended a thesis about this question, he will give props to the court and prosecution, though nothing can be guessed in advance yet. I became acquainted with Pranaitis and am firmly convinced that he is the person who knows the problem, about which he will talk, in depth... Everything, then, will depend on which arguments priest Pranaitis will furnish, and he has them, and they're shattering for the Jewry.

Pranaitis' credibility rapidly dissipated when the defense demonstrated his ignorance of basic Talmudic concepts and definitions, such as hullin, to the point where "many in the audience occasionally laughed out loud when he clearly became confused and couldn't even intelligibly answer some of the questions asked by my lawyer." A Tsarist secret police agent is quoted, reporting on Pranaitis' testimony, as saying:

Cross-examination of Pranaitis has weakened evidentiary value of his expert opinion, exposing lack of knowledge of texts, insufficient knowledge of Jewish literature. Because of amateurish knowledge and lack of resourcefulness, Pranaitis' expert opinion is of very low value. Professors Troitskij and Kokovtsev, who were interrogated today, gave conclusions which are exceptionally positive for the defence, praising doctrines of the Jewish religion, and not accepting even a possibility of a religious murder by Jews ... Vipper thinks that acquittal is possible.

=== Defense ===
A Beilis Defense Committee advisor, a writer named Ben-Zion Katz, suggested countering Father Pranaitis with questions like "When did Baba Bathra live and what was her activity" which he described as the equivalent of asking an American "Who lived at the Gettysburg Address?", a ploy that invites a purported expert witness unfamiliar with the subject matter to wrongly assume a word is used in one sense where it is in fact used in another, demonstrating the ignorance of the witness for the audience. In Russian Baba means grandmother whereas Baba in Aramaic, the language used in the Talmud means gate, thus exposing Pranaitis' lack of direct understanding of the contents of the Talmud. In the Gettysburg example, an informed person will immediately recognise the term 'Gettysburg Address' refers to a speech (address) and not to a location (address). His credibility rapidly evaporated to the point where "many in the audience occasionally laughed out loud when he clearly became confused and couldn't even intelligibly answer some of the questions asked by [Beilis'] lawyer."

Beilis was represented by the most able attorneys of the Moscow, St. Petersburg, and Kiev bars: Vasily Maklakov, Oscar Gruzenberg, N. Karabchevsky, A. Zarudny, and D. Grigorovitch-Barsky. Two prominent Russian professors, Troitsky and Kokovtzov, spoke on behalf of the defense in praise of Jewish values and exposed the falsehood of the accusations, while Aleksandr Glagolev, philosopher and professor of the Kiev Theological Academy of the Orthodox Christian, affirmed that "the Law of Moses forbids spilling human blood and using any blood in general in food." The well-known and respected Rabbi of Moscow, Rabbi Yaakov Mazeh, delivered a long, detailed speech quoting passages from the Torah, the Talmud and many other books to conclusively debunk the testimony of the "experts" brought forth by the prosecution.

=== Case summary ===
The lamplighter on whose testimony the indictment of Beilis rested confessed that he had been confused by the secret police.

The prosecution's case was further undermined after it had spent a great deal of effort to link the 13 wounds which Professor Sikorsky had discovered on a part of the murdered boy's body with the importance of the number thirteen in "Jewish ritual," only to have it revealed later that there were actually 14 wounds on that part of the body.

The chief prosecutor A.I. Vipper made supposedly antisemitic statements in his closing address. There are conflicting accounts of the twelve Christian jurors: seven were members of the notorious Union of the Russian People, part of the movement known as the Black Hundreds. There was no representative of the intelligentsia in the jury, and most of them were reported to be Ukrainian peasants. However, after deliberating for several hours, the jury acquitted Beilis.

== After the trial ==
Title page of the 1913 song "The Freeing of Mendel Beilis"

The Beilis trial was followed worldwide and the antisemitic policies of the Russian Empire were severely criticized. The Arabic newspaper Filastin published in Jaffa, Palestine, dealt with this trial in several articles. Its editor, Yousef El-Issa, published an editorial titled: "The Disgrace of the Twentieth Century". He wrote on 13 October 1913:

We said in the previous issue and repeat that their accusing the Jews of shedding blood to perform religious ritual is a fabrication with regard to those who believe it; an abomination with regard to those who spread it; and a disgrace to the twentieth century, during which, if minds are not liberated from the shackles of ignorance, God will never liberate them.

The Beilis case was compared with the Leo Frank case, in which an American Jew, manager of a pencil factory in Atlanta, Georgia, was convicted of raping and murdering 13-year-old Mary Phagan. Leo Frank was lynched after his sentence was commuted to life imprisonment.

After his acquittal, Beilis became a celebrity. One indication of the extent of his fame is the following quote: "Anyone wanting to see the major stars of New York's Yiddish stage on Thanksgiving weekend in 1913 had three choices: Mendel Beilis at Jacob Adler's Dewey Theater, Mendel Beilis at Boris Thomashefsky's National Theater, or Mendel Beilis at David Kessler's Second Avenue Theater.” The violinist Jacob Gegna also composed a piece in his honor, A tfile fun Mendel Beilis, which he recorded in 1921.

Due to his great fame, Beilis could have become wealthy through commercial appearances. Spurning all such offers, he and his family left Russia for a farm purchased by Baron Rothschild in Palestine, then a province of the Ottoman Empire. He arrived in early 1914 with celebrity status, welcomed warmly by Jews and Palestinian Arabs alike. He would even be allowed to visit al Aqsa mosque.

Beilis had difficulty making ends meet, however, but he resisted leaving. When friends and well-wishers pleaded with him to go to America, he would respond: “Before, in Russia, when the word ‘Palestine’ conjured up a waste and barren land, even then I chose to come here in preference to other countries. How much more, then, would I insist on staying here, after I have come to love the land!”

During the Russian Civil War, the Beilis trial was reopened by the Bolsheviks. The former Minister of Justice Ivan Shcheglovitov, who had the case investigated as a ritual murder, was shot after a short trial in September 1918. Vera Cheberyak, the presumed actual killer, was shot in March/April 1919, as was one of her alleged accomplices, Pyotr Singaevsky. After his identity was discovered, former prosecutor A.I. Vipper, who had been working for the Bolsheviks, was arrested and sent to a gulag. He died in prison.

=== United States ===
When Beilis' financial situation became desperate, he finally gave in. In 1922 he settled in the United States where in 1925 he self-published an account of his experiences titled The Story of My Sufferings. Originally published in Yiddish (1925 and 1931 editions), the book was later translated into English (1926, 1992, and 2011 editions), and also Russian.

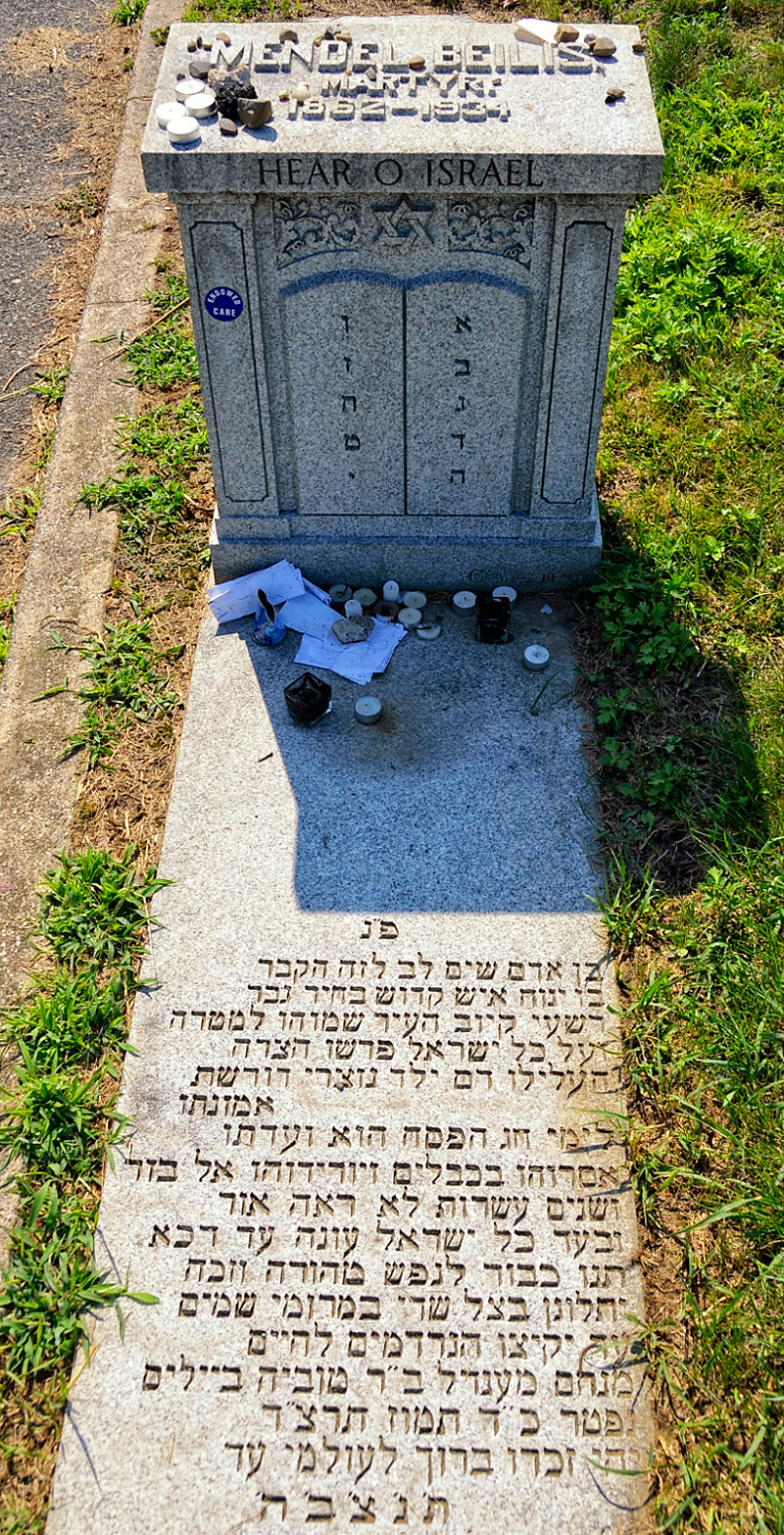
Monument at Beilis' grave

Beilis died unexpectedly at a hotel in Saratoga Springs, New York on July 7, 1934 and was buried two days later at the Mount Carmel Cemetery, Glendale, Queens, which is the burial place of Leo Frank and Sholem Aleichem. Though Beilis' fame had faded since the trial in 1913, it returned briefly at his death. His funeral was attended by over 4,000 people. The New York Times noted that Beilis' fellow Jews “always believed that his conduct [in resisting all pressure to implicate himself or other Jews] saved his countrymen from a pogrom.” A history of the Eldridge Street Synagogue, where Beilis' funeral was held, describes the scene at his funeral as follows: “The crowd could not be contained in the sanctuary. As many as a dozen policemen failed to establish order in the streets.”

Around six months before his death, Beilis was interviewed by the English-language Jewish Daily Bulletin. Asked for “one outstanding impression” of the trial in Kiev, he paid a final tribute to the Russian Gentiles who had helped him to escape the blood libel, such as the detective Mykola Krasovsky (Nikolai Krasovsky) and the journalist Brazul-Brushkovsky: “There was real heroism, real sacrifice. They knew that by defending me their careers would be ruined, even their very lives would not be safe. But they persisted because they knew I was innocent.”

== Depiction in The Fixer ==
While Bernard Malamud's novel The Fixer is based on the life of Mendel Beilis, Malamud transformed Beilis’ character, and that of his wife, in ways that Beilis' descendants found degrading. The real Mendel Beilis was “a dignified, respectful, well-liked, fairly religious family man with a faithful wife, Esther, and five children.” Malamud's protagonist Yakov Bok is “an angry, foul-mouthed, cuckolded, friendless, childless blasphemer.”

When The Fixer was first published, Beilis’ son David Beilis wrote to Malamud, complaining both that Malamud had plagiarized from Beilis’ memoirs and that Malamud had debased the memories of Beilis and his wife through the characters of Yakov Bok and Bok's wife Raisl. Malamud wrote back, attempting to reassure David Beilis that The Fixer “makes no attempt to portray Mendel Beilis or his wife. Yakov and Raisl Bok, I am sure you will agree, in no way resemble your parents.”

The historian Albert Lindemann lamented: “By the late twentieth century, memory of the Beilis case came to be inextricably fused (and confused) with... The Fixer.”

== In film and literature ==
- The Bloody Hoax (originally in Yiddish as Der blutike shpas), 1912, a novel by Sholem Aleichem whose plot is largely based on details of Beilis Affair.
- The Black 107, 1913 film
- The Mystery of the Mendel Beilis Case, 1914
- Delo Beilisa (aka The Beilis Case), 1917 film by Joseph Soiffer
- The Fixer, Malamud's 1966 novel, winner of the Pulitzer Prize and the National Book Award
- The Fixer, 1968 film after the novel
- Scapegoat on Trial, 2007, Joshua Waletzky
- "Blood Libel in Late Imperial Russia: The Ritual Murder Trial of Mendel Beilis", 2013, Robert Weinberg
- A Child of Christian Blood, Edmund Levin, 2014

== See also ==
- History of the Jews in Russia and Soviet Union
- History of the Jews in Ukraine
- Black Hundreds
- Antisemitism in Ukraine
- Dreyfus affair
- The Fixer (Malamud novel)
- Leo Frank
- Multan affair
