= Oscar Gruzenberg =

Ukrainian-born lawyer (1866–1940)

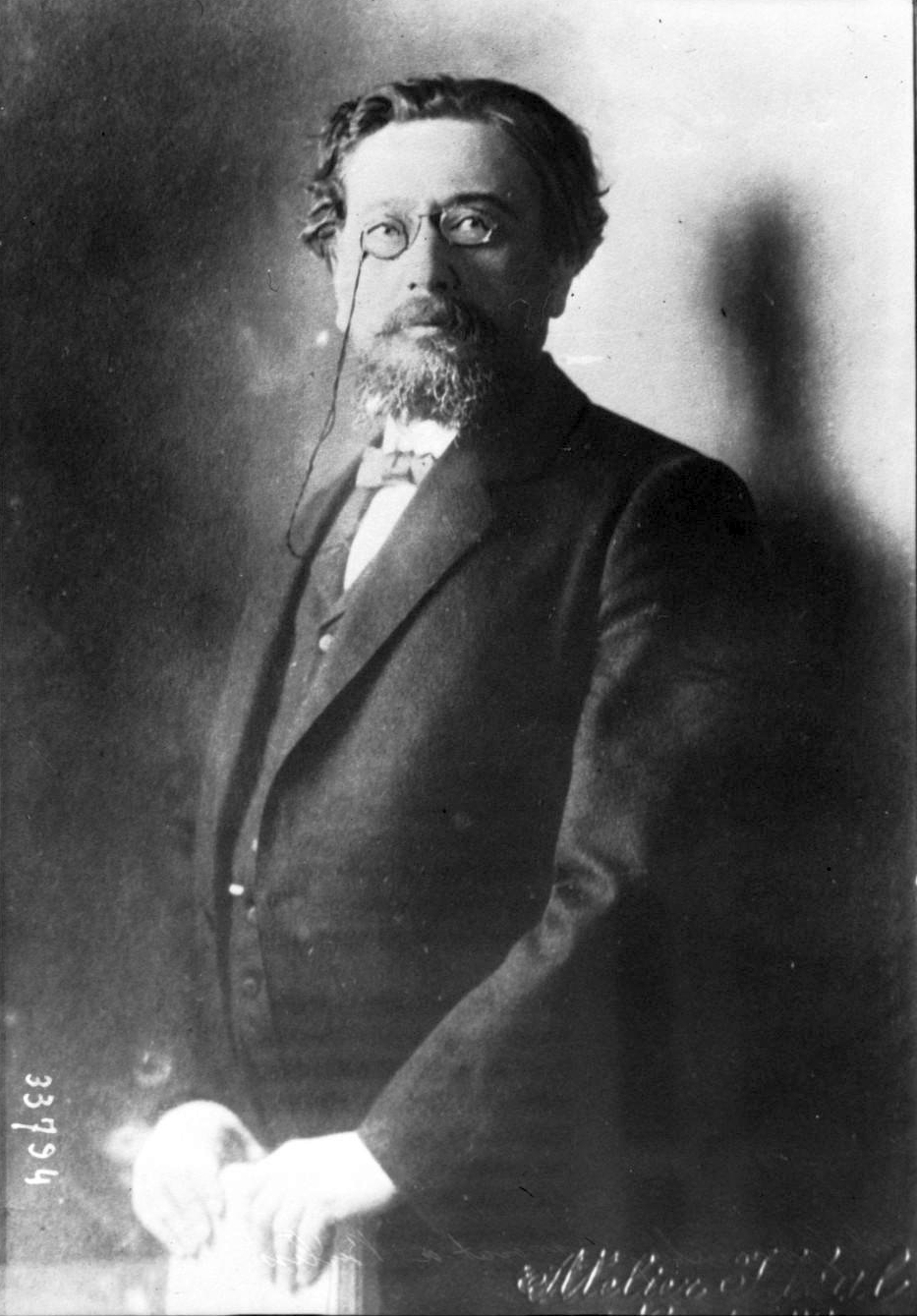
Photograph of Gruzenberg.

Oskar Osipovich Gruzenberg (in German transliteration - Grusenberg; Russian: Оскар Осипович Грузенберг; also known as Israel Gruzenberg Hebrew: ישראל גרוזנברג; 1866–1940) was a prominent defense attorney.

== Life ==
Gruzenberg was born to a family of a Jewish merchant in Yekaterinoslav in 1866. His father died from anthrax when he was a child, plunging the family into poverty. After graduation from a gymnasium (high school) in Kiev, Gruzenberg enrolled in Kiev University to study jurisprudence. He made a name for himself defending striking workers and members of the revolutionary parties. He also participated in the defense of Beilis in the infamous case of blood libel. He was a founder of Folksgrupe.

Leaving Russia after the October Revolution, he emigrated to Berlin. In 1926, he relocated to the city of Riga in Latvia where he was elected to represent the Latvian Jewish community in the Jewish Agency for Israel. In 1932, he relocated again to Nice in France where he lived until his death in 1940.

Gruzenberg noted in his will the wish to be buried in Israel, and indeed this was achieved in 1950. His body was buried in Trumpeldor Cemetery in Tel Aviv.
