= Mykola Krasovsky =

Ukrainian police officer and witness

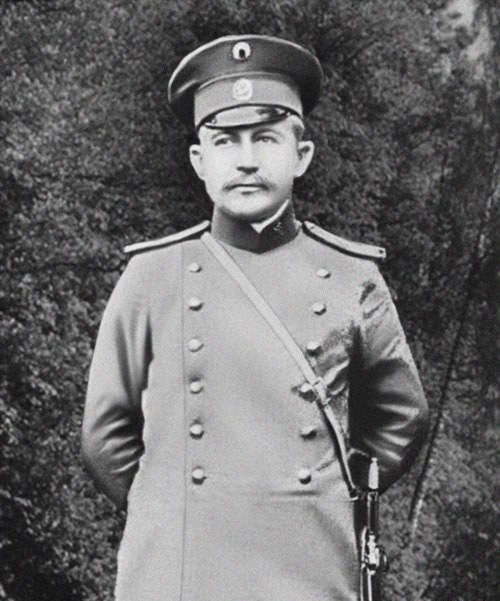
Mykola Krasovsky

Mykola Krasovsky (Ukrainian: Микола Олександрович Красовський, Russian: Николай Александрович Красовский, romanized: Nikolay Krasovsky, 31 March 1871 - after 1934) was a police officer from Kyiv (then part of the Russian Empire), who played an important role as investigator during the Beilis affair, a criminal process spurred by antisemitic attitudes prevalent during that era. After the fall of Tsarism Krasovsky entered the service of the newly proclaimed Ukrainian People's Republic, becoming the chief of Ukrainian counterintelligence. For his investigatory activities Krasovsky was compared by his contemporaries to Lecoq.

== Biography ==
=== Early life ===
Mykola Oleksandrovych Krasovsky was born in Kyiv into a family of an Orthodox priest. After graduating from a theological seminary, he refused to follow the steps of his father and entered police service. His police career started in 1893, when he was appointed an aide to the chief of local police in Nizhyn. In 1896 Krasovskyi started working as an inspector of Chernihiv police. Later he served as a prison director in Mglin.

After the outbreak of the Russo-Japanese War in 1904 Krasovsky supervised the mobilization in Krolevets, receiving a letter of gratitude from the governor. During the Revolution of 1905 Krasovsky was appointed head of police in the area of Kozelets, fighting against criminal gangs which were active in the vicinity. After an attack on his office by the leader of a criminal group, as well as a conflict with one of the local officials, in 1907 Krasovskyi had to resign from his post. In 1908 he was transferred to Kyiv Police, where he served for a period of time as head of the investigative department. On this position Krasovsky became known as one of the best detectives of his time.

=== Beilis Affair ===
In December 1910, after a conflict with local police authorities, Krasovskyi was transferred to Skvyra, but already a few months later was recalled to Kyiv to investigate the murder of a 13-year old boy, which was blamed by the prosecution on a local Jew called Menahem Mendel Beilis. After leading an investigation, Krasovsky managed to prove the innocence of Beilis and found the real culprits implicated in the crime. However, Kyiv's antisemitic Russian nationalist organizations, known as Black Hundreds, spread rumours about Krasovskyi being bribed, which led to his dismissal from the post of investigator and release of suspects detained on his orders. In late 1911 Krasovsky was fired from the police, but refused to stop his engagement in the affair and started his own private investigation. This led to his arrest on the orders of local prosecution. After Krasovsky testified as a witness during the Beilis trial, authorities also put pressure on his family. Finally, in October 1913 the jury acquitted Beilis, confirming the results of Krasovsky's investigation.

In order to prove the guilt of people implicated by him in the crime for which Beilis had been falsely accused, soon after the verdict Krasovsky travelled to the United States, where he was aided by the American Jewish Committee in contacting an important witness of the crime who had since then emigrated. After returning to Kyiv, he found himself under increased pressure from local criminal groups and the Black Hundreds, and had to flee to Konotop, where he stayed until the fall of the Tsarist regime in 1917.

=== In Ukrainian service ===
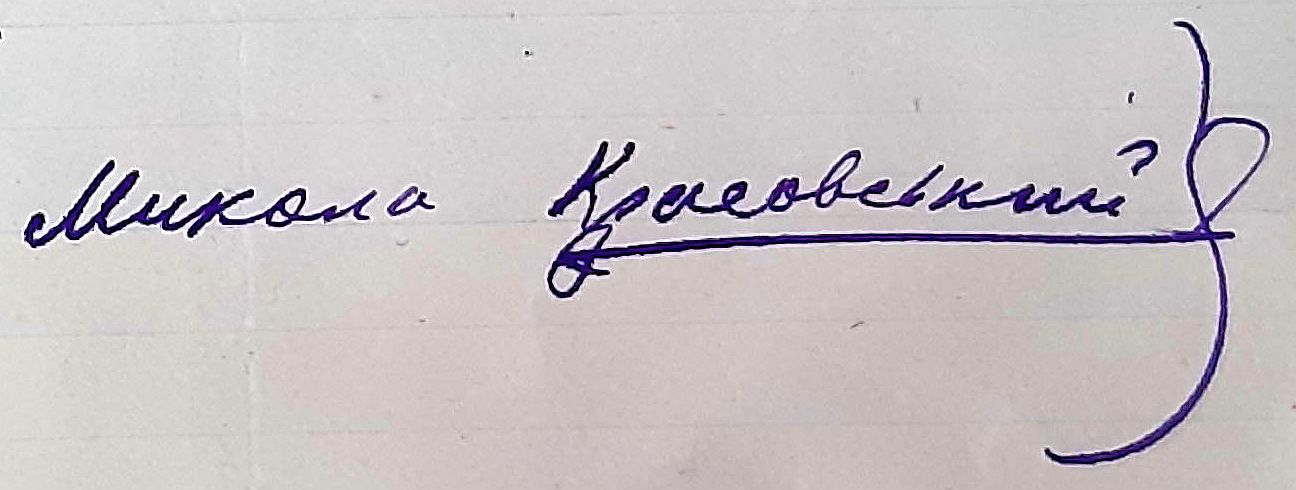
Personal signature of Krasovsky made during his service in the Ukrainian government in 1919

On 7 March 1917, soon after his return to Kyiv, Krasovsky was appointed commissar of the city's department of crime investigation. In July 1918 he was arrested by German counterintelligence on the accusation of participation in a secret society aiming to liberate Ukraine from German occupation and taking part in the kidnapping of a local banker who had ties to Germans. Krasovskyi was sentenced to two years of imprisonment, but was freed after the fall of the German-friendly Skoropadsky regime in December of the same year.

After the establishment of the Directorate of Ukraine, in April 1919 Krasovskyi was appointed to a post in the Interior Ministry. In this position he was tasked with overseeing the operation of Ukrainian railways during the Polish-Ukrainian War. In May 1920 Krasovskyi was appointed head of the Information Bureau, which functioned as part of the intelligence service subjected to the General Staff of Ukrainian armed forces. On this position he prevented an assassination attempt on Symon Petliura. The Bolsheviks compared the functions of Bureau to the Cheka and appointed an award of 300,000 roubles for the elimination of any of its agents.

In October 1920, together with the rest of forces of the Ukrainian People's Republic, Krasovskyi retreated to Polish territory. In January 1921 he was accused by his deputy of deserting and entering Polish service, but those claims could not be proven, and in November Krasovsky was reinstated as head of Ukrainian counterintelligence. However, due to the lack of funds his department was eventually excluded from the General Staff and soon thereafter disbanded.

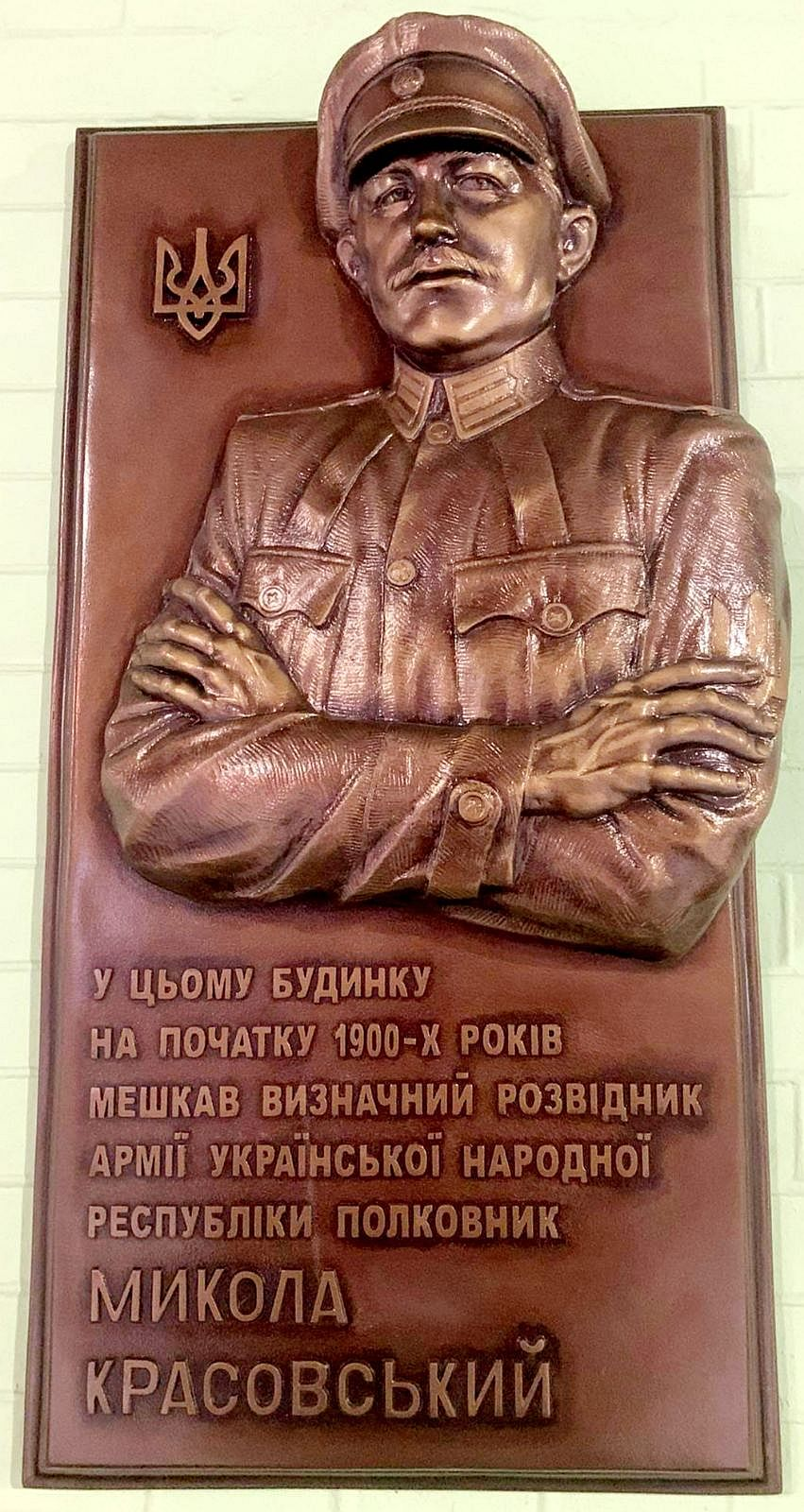
Memorial plaque to Krasovsky on Yaroslaviv Val Street, 21/20а in Kyiv

=== Later years and death ===
Further fate of Krasovsky after his resignation from service is unclear. According to some information, he emigrated to Egypt, settling in Cairo where a colony of emigrants from the former Russian Empire existed at that time, and died in October 1938. Other sources claim that he continued to co-operate with the Government of the Ukrainian People's Republic in exile, and in 1934 attempted to cross the Soviet border, but was arrested by the GPU. Krasovskyi's surname is present among the names of suspected spies captured by Soviet security services in the area of Yampil, most of whom were later executed.

== Legacy ==
During his exile in the 1920s Krasovskyi planned to publish his memoirs dedicated to the Beilis Affair, which he considered to be a provocation by the Tsarist government. However, no manuscripts of the work were ever found in the archives.

After Ukraine attained independence, Krasovskyi's life was memorialized in a number of articles, in the media and in expositions dedicated to the history of Ukraine's security services. In 2022 a memorial plaque was installed on the wall of a house in Kyiv where he lived in the early 1900s.
