= Multan affair =

The Multan affair was a high-profile late 19th century case about a ritual murder in the Russian Empire allegedly committed by a group of Udmurt peasants in the village of Old Multan.

The affair is called by the name of the village where the initial event happened, "Vuzh Multan" (Old Multan) in Udmurt. It has been subsequently renamed to Korolenko village, in Vladimir Korolenko's honour and memory.

The case is considered a model of fruitful cooperation between lawyers, investigative journalists, and government officials. Korolenko and Anatoly Koni played significant roles in bringing the Multan case to attention.

== In culture ==
In addition to a considerable amount of journalistic and historical research, the case has been fictionalized numerous times. It includes The Old Multan (1954), magnum opus of Udmurt writer Mikhail Petrov (1905—1955), and Pelagia and the White Bulldog (2006), novel from Sister Pelagia mystery series of Boris Akunin. The Multan affair is also mentioned in Alexandra Brushtein's novel At Dawn Hour (1958) and Vasily Yan's book Notes of a Pedestrian (1901).

== See also ==
- Mendel Beilis affair
