= The Blind Musician =

1886 novel by Vladimir Korolenko

- Author: Vladimir Korolenko
- Original title: Слепой музыкант
- Language: Russian
- Publisher: Russkiye Vedomosti
- Publication date: 1886
- Publication place: Russian Empire

The Blind Musician (Russian: Слепой музыкант, romanized: Slepoi muzykant) is an 1886 novel by Vladimir Korolenko. Originally serialised in 2 February-13 April of that year by Russkiye Vedomosti, it then appeared in a considerably altered version in the July 1886 issue of Russkaya Mysl and a year later came out as a separate edition, again revised by the author. Korolenko stopped editing the text only after the book's sixth edition came out in 1898.

Arguably his most acclaimed and best-known work, The Blind Musician caused controversy in its time and was subjected to severe criticism from the Moscow University's private docent A.M. Shcherbina, who had lost sight at the age of two and considered Korolenko's theories regarding blind people's 'intrinsic longing for light' totally groundless. "...To create a creditable treatise on blind man's psychology has never been my objective. The idea was, rather, to bring to closer examination man's longing for all things unattainable, for this ever missing fullness of life," Korolenko explained in a 10 January 1917 letter to Arkady Gornfeld.
