= Yaroslaviv Val Street =

Street in Kyiv, Ukraine

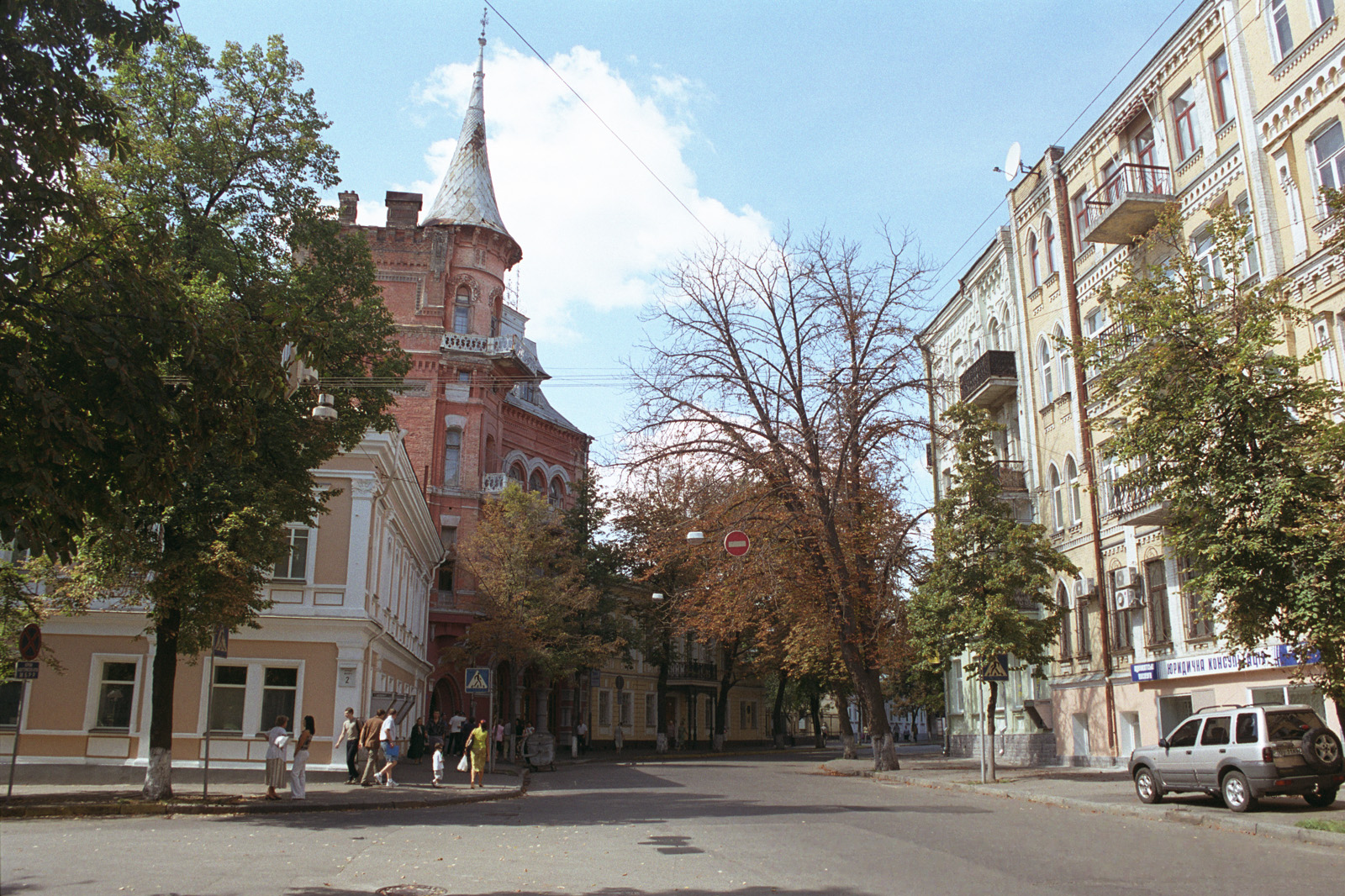
- View of Yaroslaviv Val from the Golden Gate
- Native name: вулиця Ярославів Вал (Ukrainian)
- Former names: Pidvalna, Velyka Pidvalna, Kh. Rakovskoho, K. Voroshylova, A. Polupanova
- Namesake: Yaroslav the Wise
- Location: Old Kyiv, Shevchenkivskyi District,Kyiv, Ukraine
- Nearest metro station: Zoloti Vorota
- Southeast end: Volodymyrska Street
- Major junctions: Zolotovoritska Street; Lysenka Street; Ivana Franka Street; Striletska Street; Olesia Honchara Street
- Northwest end: Lvivska Square

Yaroslaviv Val Street (Ukrainian: вулиця Ярославів Вал, translated as "Yaroslav's Wall"), commonly abbreviated as Yarval (Ukrainian: Ярвал) is a street in the central part of the Old Kyiv historical district of the Ukrainian capital. It is considered to be one of the most popular promenades in Kyiv.

== Etymology ==
The street emerged as a road following the course of an old city wall built under the rule of Yaroslav the Wise, Grand Prince of Kyiv.

== Geography ==
The street is located at the southwestern edge of a plateau, on which the old part of Kyiv is located.

== History ==
The street was first included into the city plan in 1832. The currently existing quarters in the area were planned in 1837-1839 following a regular scheme. The new construction was caused by the expansion of Kyiv Fortress, which resulted in the transfer of the administrative and cultural centre of the city from Pechersk to Old Kyiv. The population of the district further increased due to the establishment of Kyiv University in the area.

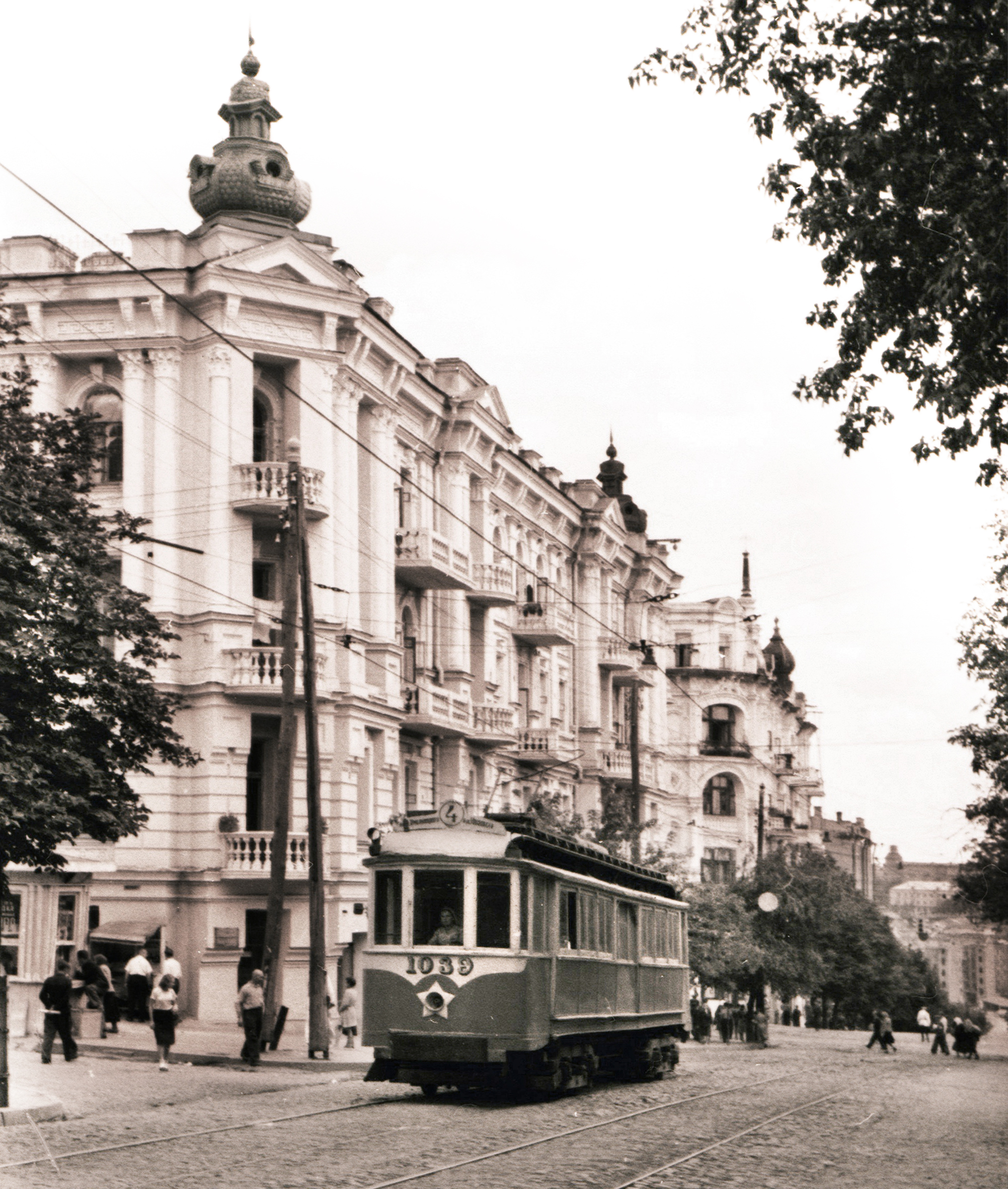
A tram in modern-day Yaroslaviv Val during the 1930s

According to the general plan of 1861, it was categorized as a second-rate street, where the construction of brick and wooden buildings on a stone base was permitted. During that time buildings in the area were predominantly of a low-rise type, with numerous utility structures, large courts and gardens in between. In 1869 it was named after prince Yaroslav the Wise, however, until the early 20th century the street would be also known under parallel names. In the late 19th century, due to fast urbanization, the street attained its modern profile characterized with high density of buildings, many of which were constructed as revenue houses.

Under the Soviet rule the street initially received the name of statesman Christian Rakovsky, but in 1928 was renamed after military commander Kliment Voroshilov. In 1957 its name was changed in memory of the first Soviet military commissar of Kyiv A. Polupanov. In 1962 the street received one of its historical names - Velyka Pidvalna ("Great Wall Street"), and since 1975 has been known once again as Yaroslaviv Val (literally "Yaroslav's Wall").

== Notable buildings ==
The entry to the street is represented by the reconstructed historical Golden Gate of Kyiv, whose original foundations date to the 11th century. The street contains numerous monuments of architecture which belong to various styles including Historicism, Classicism, Art Nouveau, Moorish Revival, Renaissance Revival etc. Embassies of Poland, Canada, Slovakia and Czech Republic are also located in the street.

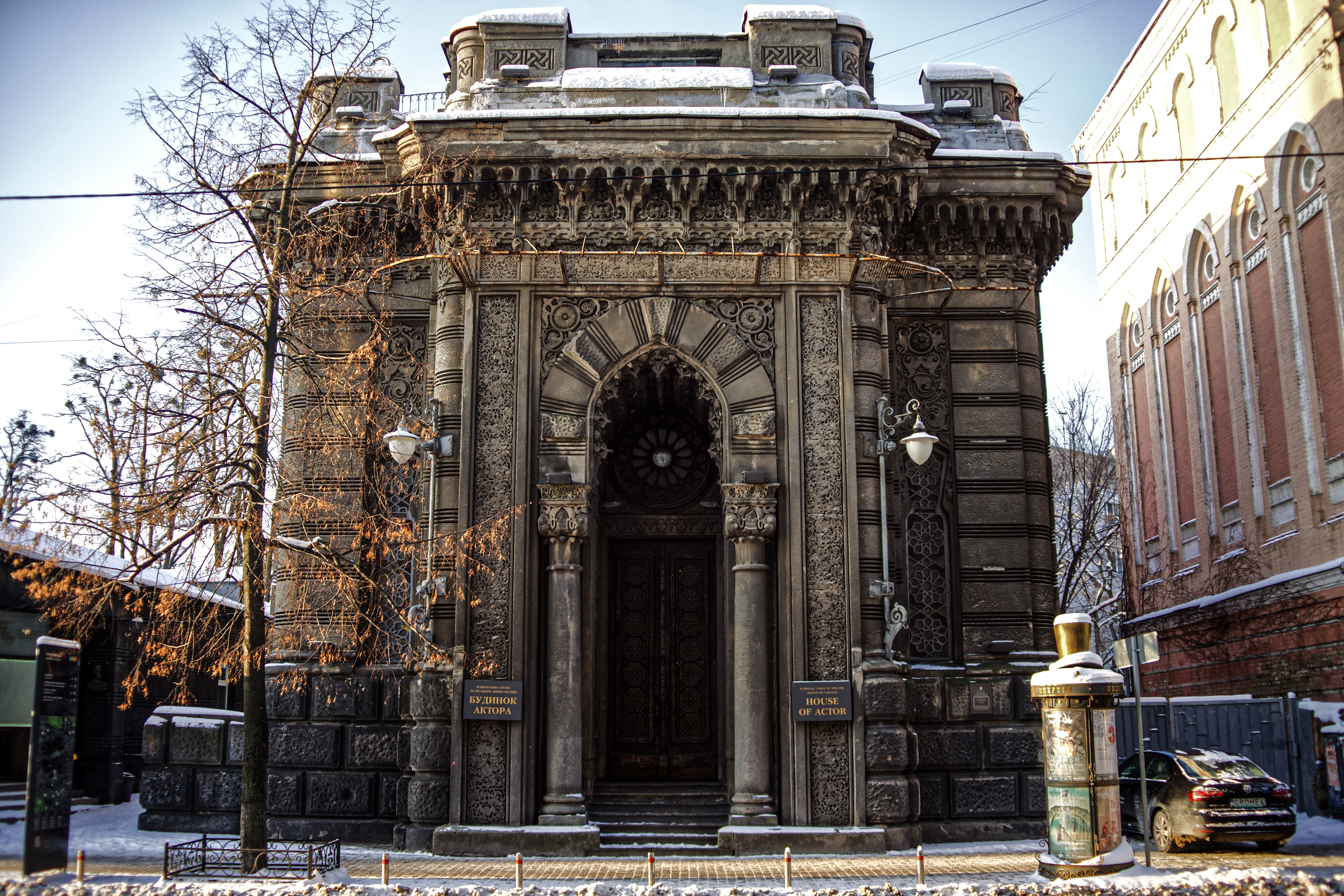
Former Karaite Kenesa, Yaroslaviv Val, 7

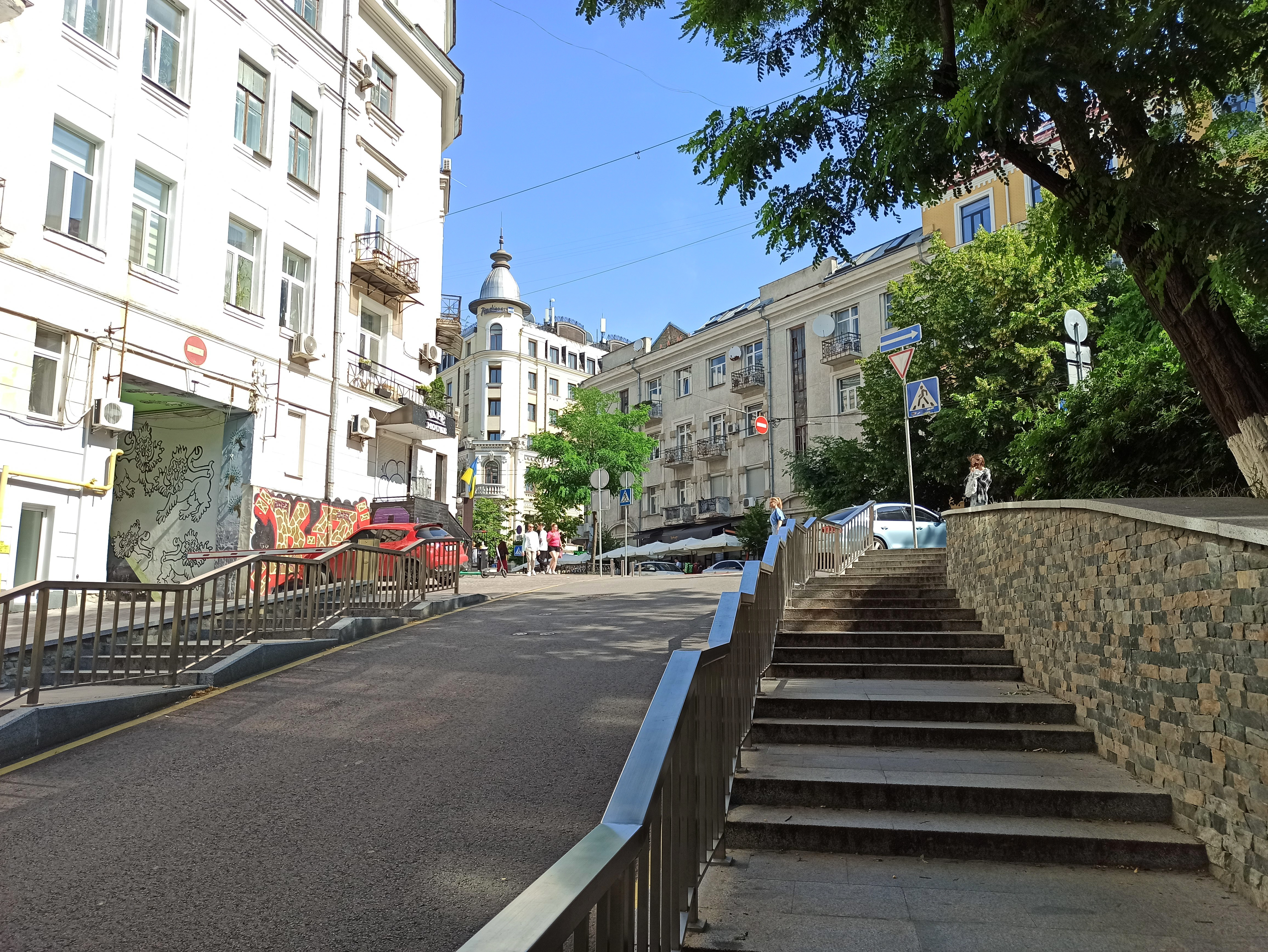
View from Ivan Franko Street

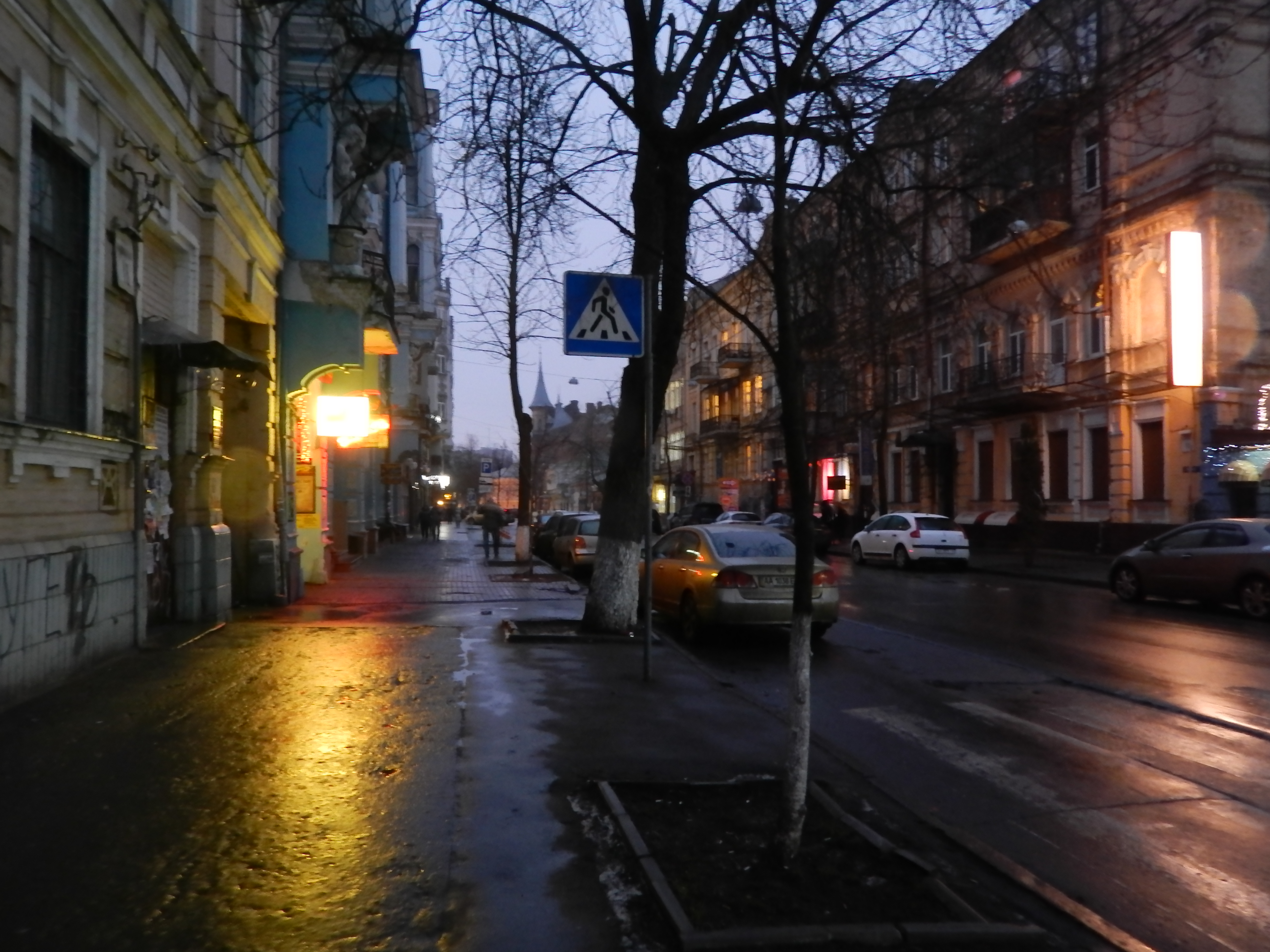
View in the direction of Golden Gate

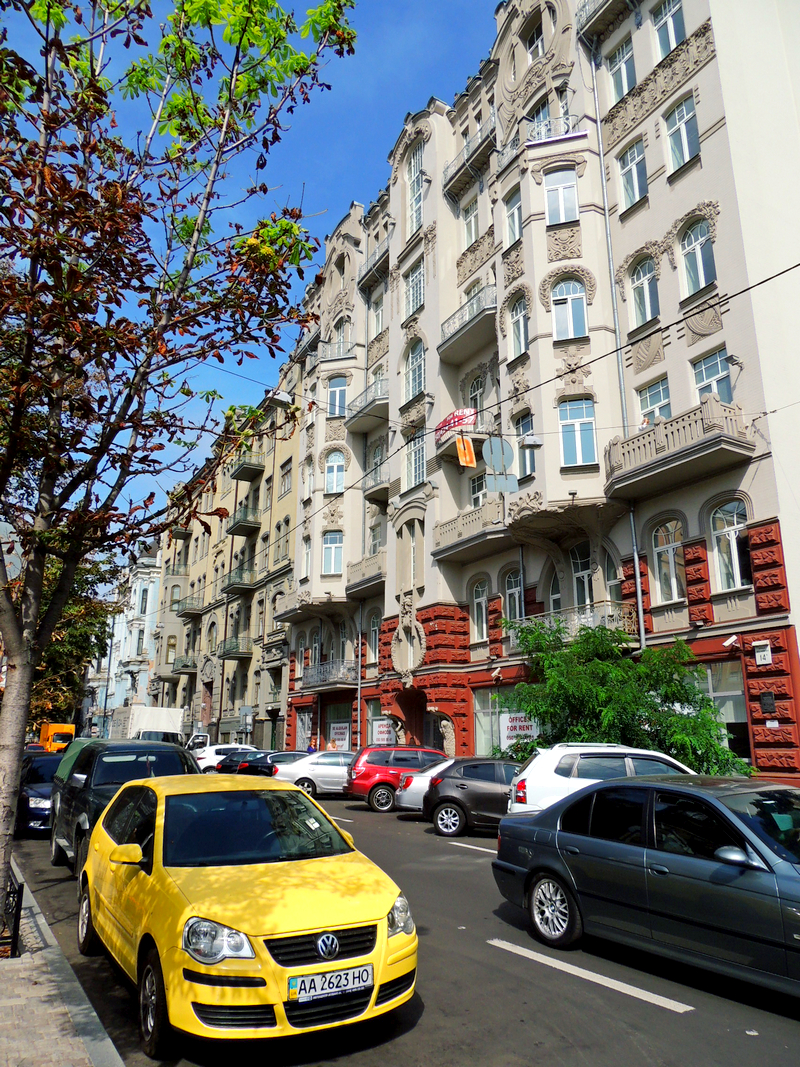
Historical architecture in the street

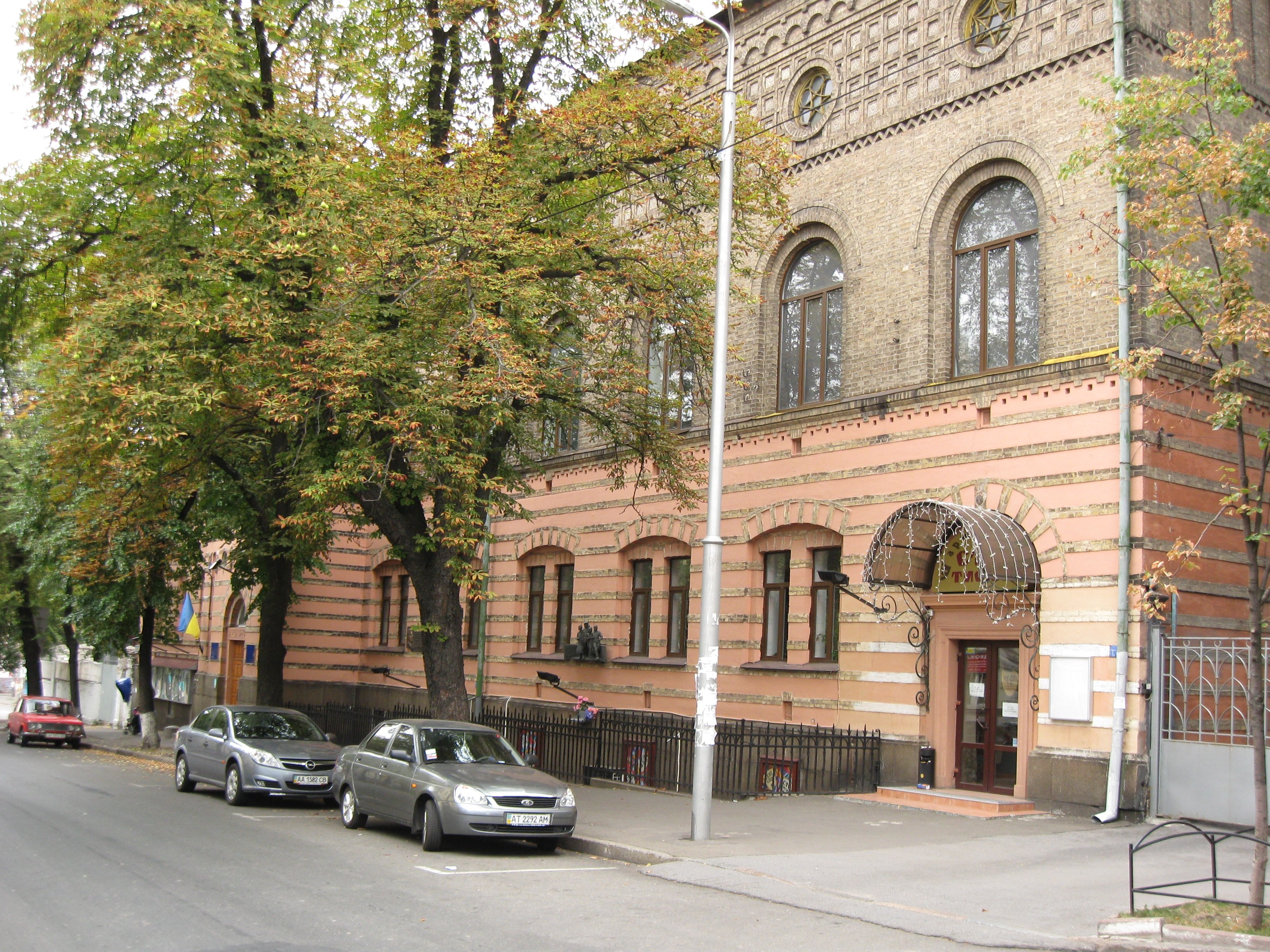
Kyiv Theatre, Cinema and Television University, Yaroslaviv Val, 40

== Famous inhabitants ==
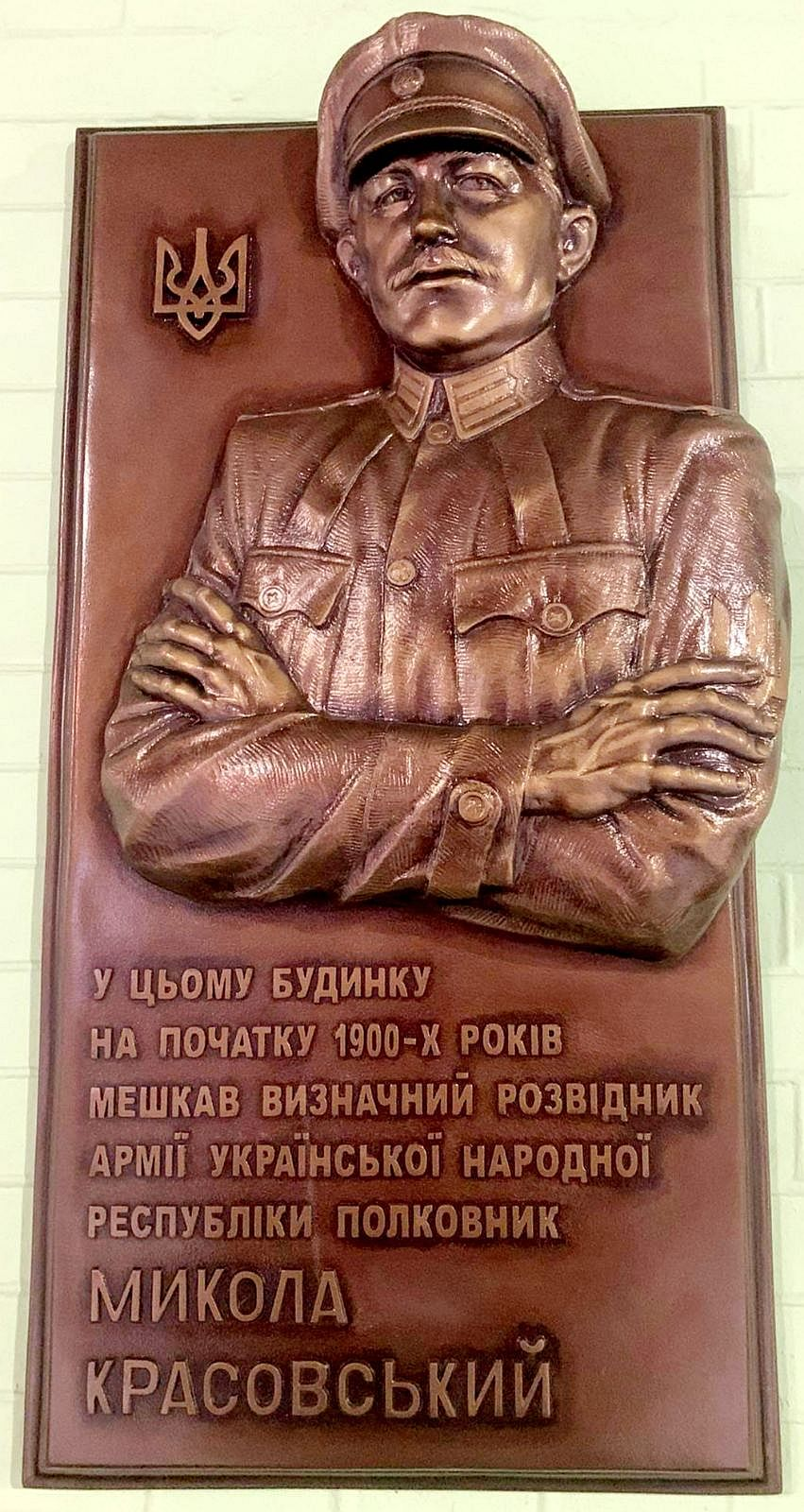
Memorial plaque to Mykola Krasovskyi on building 21/20а

- Anatol Petrytsky, Ukrainian painter
- Mykola Strazhesko, doctor
- Vadym Meller, painter
- Olena Muravyova, Ukrainian opera singer
- Konstantin Paustovsky, Russian and Soviet writer
- Mykola Porsh, Ukrainian politician
- Igor Sikorsky, aviation engineer
- Victor Glushkov, Soviet computer engineer
- Fyodor Lesh, doctor
- Tymofiy Strokach, Soviet statesman
- Mykola Krasovsky, Ukrainian detective and intelligence officer
- Georgy Chelpanov, philosopher
- Ivan Steshenko, Ukrainian statesman
- Mitrofan Dovnar-Zapolsky, historian
- Khrystofor Baranovsky, Ukrainian statesman
- Lesia Ukrainka, Ukrainian poet
- Klyment Kvitka, Ukrainian ethnographer, Lesia Ukrainka's husband
- Mariia Starytska, Ukrainian actress

== Sources ==
- Ярославів Вал | Звід Історії Памʼяток Києва
