= Folksgrupe =

Folksgrupe פאָלקסגרופּע
- Founded: March 1905
- Headquarters: Saint Petersburg
- Ideology: Anti-zionism; Jewish minority politics

Folksgrupe (Yiddish: פאָלקסגרופּע, 'People's Group' in English) was a Jewish anti-Zionist political organization in Russia, founded at a meeting in Vilna in March 1905. The organization proclaimed to work for establishing 'civil, political and national rights for the Jewish People in Russia'. The full name of the organization was the League for the Attainment of Full Rights for the Jewish People in Russia. Its followers were known as Dostizhentsi (from Достижение, dostizheniye, 'attainment').

Led by three prominent lawyers, Maxim Vinaver, Oscar Gruzenberg and Henrik Sliozberg, it assembled liberal elements from the Cadet Party. The party demanded equal civic rights, abolishing laws imposing restrictions on Jews, linguistic rights (the right have access to Yiddish and Hebrew schooling) and independence of religious institutions. However, it did not advocate national autonomy for the Jews.

The central bureau of the group was located in Saint Petersburg. Half of the bureau was based in the city and the other half was based in the provinces.

Zionists and the Folkspartei leader Simon Dubnow came to accuse the group of favouring assimilation. Dubnow had belonged to the group at its initial stage, and formed part of its central bureau. The party was however able to find common ground and some cooperation with the Bund, in their opposition to Zionism.
