= Aleksei Glagolev =

Ukrainian priest (1901–1972)

Alexej Alexandrovich Glagolev
- Born: 2 June [O.S. 20 May] 1901; Kiev, Russian Empire
- Died: 23 January 1972 (aged 70); Kiev, Ukrainian Soviet Socialist Republic
- Education: Kiev Theological Seminary, Kiev Pedagogy Institute
- Spouse: Tatiana Pavlovna Glagoleva
- Children: Nikolai Glagolev and Magdalina Palian-Glagoleva
- Parent(s): Alexander Alexandrovich and Zinaida Petrovna Glagolev
- Church: Russian Orthodox
- Ordained: 1941
- Offices held: Pastor in Kiev Pokrovskaya Church

Alexej Alexandrovich Glagolev (Ukrainian: Олесій Олександрович Глаголєв: Russian: Алексей Алекса́ндрович Глаго́лев; 2 June [O.S. 20 May] 1901 – 23 January 1972) was a Ukrainian Orthodox priest, honoured as one of the Righteous Among the Nations.

== Family and education ==
Alexej Glagolev was born to the family of Alexander Glagolev, the priest and professor of Kiev Theological Academy. His father died in Kiev prison in 1937. His mother, Zinaida Petrovna (née Slesarskaya) was a daughter of the head librarian of Kiev Theological Academy. He had a brother named Sergei and a sister named Varvara.

Alexej graduated with distinction from a high school in Kiev. Between 1919 and 1923, he studies at the Kiev Theological Academy. Throughout this period the academy was shut by Bolsheviks and worked illegally. In 1926, he married Tatiana Pavlovna, née Bulashevich, a daughter of the owner of the sugar plant. They were both members of the Kiev religious community of the priest Anatole Zhurakovsky. Their children: Magdalina (born 1926) and Maria (born 1943).

== Life in 1930s ==
On 7 May 1932, Alexej Glagolev was arrested and accused of acting against revolution. In one week's time he was set free but had no vote rights as a son of "cult worker" (Soviet term for a priest). He worked at the constructions side, security in the nursery at the jam factory. In 1936 he started the degree in Physics and Mathematics in Kiev Pedagogy Institute, graduated in 1940. He continued secretly working in an underground church.

== Priest ==
In 1941, after the Great Patriotic War began, he was made a priest by Archbishop Veniamin (Novitsky) and served in the Pokrov Church in Kiev.

== Saving Jews during the Nazi occupation ==
During the Nazi occupation of Ukraine in the Second World War, Glagolev and his family were saving Jews from the Nazis. Glagolevs hid Jews in their own home and homes of their congregants. Alexej also gave Jews fake christening birth certificates left from his father, priest Alexander Glagolev. Once Alexej's wife Tatiana changed the photo in her own passport and gave it to a Jewish woman which was in hiding. Father Alexej wrote about this episode in his memoirs: "My wife almost paid with her own life for her reckless action. Gestapo walked flat to flat for requisitions. They asked for her papers and when they found out that she did not have a passport, they were going to arrest her and take to Gestapo. Very few people returned to their homes after such arrests. We begged and just about managed to persuade them to leave her alone, a few witnesses having identified her identity".

They also managed to save a family of a Russian Red Army lieutenant colonel – his wife and six kids. Glagolev family took a huge risk, hiding Jews was punished by execution, but they continued doing it despite Tatiana's pregnancy (she gave birth to Maria in 1943).

In 1943, Alexej worked in the hospital church in Pokrov Monastery. He stayed in Podil with the people he was hiding despite the demands of German administration to leave this part of Kiev. In autumn of 1943, he was detained by German authorities, twice beaten up and deported to Germany with his son, but they managed to escape. In 1945, he wrote a detailed letter about the Jews he has saved to the First Secretary of the Central Committee of Ukraine Nikita Khrushchev.

== After the war ==
After the war Glagolev carried on working as a priest in the Pokrov church until its closure in 1960. Then he worked in few other churches. Towards the end of his life he was very ill as a result of beatings by Nazis in 1943 and underwent several surgeries.

The journalist Sergei Kokurin in his article «Glagolev: the hard truth» characterized Alexej Glagolev as follows:

It is hard to understand to an average man the determination with which Glagolev went against the tide. <...> In 1936, this fragile-looking intellectual was publicly carrying the cross taken off a Church of Nikola the Kind and despite the threats from Komsomol members kept it in his flat. He was the only priest in Kiev that refused in April 1942 to hold a church service to celebrate Hitler's birthday. He was not afraid in 1946 to host in the church the family ordered by Court to leave Kiev within 24 hours, because NKVD officer occupied their flat.

== Memory of Alexej Glagolev ==
On 12 September 1991, Yad Vashem recognized Aleksej and Tatyana Glagolev, and their daughter, Magdalina (Mariya) Palyan, as Righteous Among the Nations On 8 October 2000, Yad Vashem recognized Nikolay Glagolev as Righteous Among the Nations. Nikolay who served as a messenger between his parents and the people being saved.

On 30 January 2002, to commemorate the 100th anniversary of Alexej Glagolev's birth, a memorial plaque to Alexander Glagolev and Alexej Glagolev was erected on the wall of The National University of Kyiv-Mohyla Academy (Volshskaja Street 8/5, korpus 4).
