= E. G. Glagoleva =

Soviet and Russian mathematician

Elena Georgievna Glagoleva (Russian: Елена Георгиевна Глаголева, 8 April 1926 – 20 July 2015) was a Soviet and Russian mathematician and mathematics educator who organized a correspondence school for the mathematics in the Soviet Union based at Moscow State University, and as part of the project coauthored two mathematics textbooks with Israel Gelfand.

She is the author of:

- Метод координат (with I. M. Gelfand and A. A. Kirillov, 1964); translated into English by Richard A. Silverman as The Coordinate Method (Pocket Mathematical Library, Gordon & Breach, 1969), and by Leslie Cohn and David Sookne as The Method of Coordinates (Library of School Mathematics, MIT Press, 1967; Dover, 2002)
- Функции и графики (with I. M. Gelfand and E. E. Schnol, 1965); translated into English as Functions and Graphs by Richard A. Silverman (Pocket Mathematical Library, Gordon & Breach, 1969) and by Thomas Walsh and Randell Magee (MIT Press, 1969; Birkhäuser, 1990; Dover, 2002); translated into German by Reinhard Hoffmann as Funktionen und ihre graphische Darstellung (Teubner, 1971)
- Электричество в живых организмах (Electricity in Living Organisms, with M. B. Berkinblit, 1988)
