= Aleksandr Glagolev =

Russian Orthodox priest (1872–1937)

Alexander Alexandrovich Glagolev
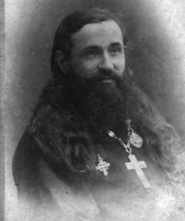
- Professor Alexander Alexandrovich Glagolev
- Born: February 14, 1872; Pokrovskoye, Tula Governorate
- Died: November 25, 1937 (aged 65); Kiev
- Education: Tula Theological Seminary, Kiev Theological Seminary
- Spouse: Zinaid Petrovna Glagoleva
- Children: Alexey, Sergey and Varvara
- Church: Russian Orthodox
- Ordained: 1903
- Writings: Specialist in Ancient Hebrew and Old Testament
- Offices held: Pastor in Kiev Church Of Nikola Dobriy

Alexander Alexandrovich Glagolev (Ukrainian: Олександр Олександрович Глаголєв, Russian: Алекса́ндр Алекса́ндрович Глаго́лев; 14 February 1872 – 25 November 1937) was a Russian Orthodox priest and religious philosopher as well as professor of the Kiev Theological Seminary.

== Biography ==
Alexander Glagolev was born to a priestly family. He graduated from the Tula theological seminary (1894) and the Kiev theological seminary (1898) with a doctoral degree in theology. His thesis was called "Angels in the Old Testament". In the review of his thesis, professor Olesnitsky noted that: "Glagolev's dissertation has both breadth and depth of research covering all points in the Old Testament angelology... and should be considered a real contribution to our theological literature which has not had until now a serious study in angelology".

Alexander Men writes in the article on Glagolev in his Bibliological Dictionary (2002):

Glagolev in his dissertation gave an overview of the history of ange[l]ology and analysed all names of angels in the Old Testament... His work also contains the history of biblical demonology. The author did not possess our modern scientific knowledge about the history of religions of [the] ancient East, but he introduced a number of interesting considerations sometimes preempting the conclusions of modern biblical studies."

== Glagolev and the Jews in Kiev ==
In 1905, Glagolev acted against the Jewish pogrom in Kiev. The Russian American journal Russkij Globus describes it as follows:

During the cruel autumn of 1905 in the buzz of pogroms and murder[,] people poured out on the streets again. A small procession meddles into the outraged human crowd wearing complete priestly vestments, carrying crosses and church banners. It is headed by the Russian priests Alexander Glagolev and Mikhail Edlinsky. Across Kontraktova Square and Gostinniy Riad the procession moves towards the Jewish shops. They admonish the crowd not to participate in this evil, unchristian act. Some people recognize their spiritual leaders and take off their hats out of respect. The crowd starts hesitating, wobbling, gets thinner and gradually breaks up. And this happened more than once.

In 1909, Glagolev published an article "The Old Testament and Its Eternal Significance in Christianity" in which he expressed some sharp criticism of some antisemitic authors trying to discredit the Old Testament.

Glagolev was a key expert witness for the defense during the 1913 trial of Menahem Mendel Beilis. At the trial he gave expert evidence against the idea that Jews used blood in their religious rituals. He stated during this trial that Mosaic laws from the Old Testament strictly forbid shedding human blood and using it to prepare food. The Talmud and other Jewish rabbinical laws confirm this prohibition. Specifically, he affirmed that "the Law of Moses forbids spilling human blood and using any blood in general in food." His statement went against the ritual murder accusation, upon which the whole case was constructed. The evidence provided by the Russian Orthodox priest and established religious philosopher was instrumental in convincing the solely Russian Christian jury that Beilis was innocent.

In addition to direct interventions against pogroms and his testimony at the Beilis trial, there were multiple recollections of Glagolev helping the poor and needy population of Kiev, both Jewish and Muslim.

== Family ==
Aleksander Glagolev was the father of Alexey Alexandrovich Glagolev, who saved Jews in Kiev during the Second World War and later became one of the Righteous among the Nations.

== Last days and death ==
On 20 October 1937, Alexander Glagolev was arrested by the NKVD. He was tortured and died in prison on 25 November 1937.
