= 1911 in film =

The year 1911 in film involved some significant events.

== Events ==
- February: The Motion Picture Story Magazine, the first American film fan magazine, is published. It is followed later in the year by Photoplay.
- April 8: Winsor McCay releases his first film Little Nemo, one of the earliest animated films.
- October 23 (October 10 OS): Svetozar Botorić's The Life and Deeds of the Immortal Leader Karađorđe (Život i dela besmrtnog vožda Karađorđa, Живот и дела бесмртног вожда Карађорђа) premieres in Belgrade and becomes the first feature film made in Serbia and the Balkans.
- October 26: Defence of Sevastopol («Оборона Севастополя») premieres at the Crimean palace of Tsar Nicholas II and becomes the first feature-length film made in the Russian Empire and one of the first in the world. It is also the first known film to use a multiple-camera setup (2 cameras)
- October 27: David Horsley's Nestor Motion Picture Company opens the first motion picture studio in Hollywood.
- November: The Kalem Company of New York pays the estate of author Lew Wallace $25,000 in legal settlement for having adapted Ben Hur (1907 film) from his novel without securing prior rights.

== Notable films ==
Films produced in the United States unless stated otherwise

=== A ===
- The Aerial Anarchists, directed by Walter R. Booth – (GB)

=== B ===
- Baron Munchausen's Dream (Les Hallucinations du baron de Münchausen), directed by Georges Méliès – (France)

=== C ===
- The Coffin Ship, produced by the Thanhouser Company

=== D ===
- David Copperfield, directed by George O. Nichols, based on the 1850 novel by Charles Dickens
- Defence of Sevastopol, directed by Aleksandr Khanzhonkov and Vasily Goncharov – (Russia)
- The Diabolical Church Window (Le Vitrail diabolique) (incomplete), directed by Georges Méliès – (France)
- The Dream, directed by Thomas H. Ince and George Loane Tucker, starring Mary Pickford and Owen Moore

=== E ===
- Enoch Arden, directed by D. W. Griffith, starring Wilfred Lucas and Linda Arvidson

=== F ===
- The Fall of Troy (La caduta di Troia), directed by Giovanni Pastrone, based on the Greek epic poem the Iliad by Homer – (Italy)

=== H ===
- The Hunchback of Notre Dame (Notre-Dame de Paris), directed by Albert Capellani, based on the 1833 novel by Victor Hugo – (France)

=== I ===
- L'Inferno (Dante's Inferno), directed by Francesco Bertolini and Giuseppe de Liguoro, based on the 14th-century narrative poem by Dante Alighieri – (Italy)
- The Italian Barber, directed by D. W. Griffith, starring Joseph Graybill and Mary Pickford

=== L ===
- The Last Drop of Water, directed by D. W. Griffith, starring Blanche Sweet
- The Life and Deeds of the Immortal Leader Karađorđe (Život i dela besmrtnog vožda Karađorđa), directed by Ilija Stanojević – (Serbia)
- Little Nemo, animated film directed by Winsor McCay
- The Lonedale Operator, directed by D. W. Griffith

=== M ===
- The Miser's Heart, directed by D. W. Griffith, starring Lionel Barrymore
- Der Müller und sein Kind (The Miller and His Child), directed by Walter Friedemann – (Austria)
- The Mummy (lost), produced by the Thanhouser Company

=== O ===
- The Odyssey (L'Odissea), directed by Francesco Bertolini and Giuseppe de Liguoro, based on the Greek epic poem by Homer – (Italy)

=== P ===
- The Pasha's Daughter, produced by the Thanhouser Company, starring William Garwood

=== S ===
- She, directed by George Nichols, based on the 1887 novel by H. Rider Haggard
- Sweet Memories, directed by Thomas H. Ince, starring Mary Pickford and King Baggot
- Swords and Hearts, directed by D. W. Griffith

=== T ===
- A Tale of Two Cities, directed by Charles Kent, starring Maurice Costello and Florence Turner, based on the 1859 novel by Charles Dickens

== Births ==
- January 5 – Jean-Pierre Aumont, actor (died 2001)
- January 7 – Butterfly McQueen, actress (died 1995)
- January 22 – Mary Hayley Bell, actress, writer and dramatist, wife of Sir John Mills (d 2005)
- January 30 – Hugh Marlowe, actor (died 1982)
- January 31 – Eddie Byrne, actor (died 1981)
- February 6 – Ronald Reagan, actor, United States President (died 2004)
- February 9 – Gypsy Rose Lee, actress and burlesque dancer (died 1970)
- February 14 – Florence Rice, actress (died 1974)
- February 19 – Merle Oberon, actress (died 1979)
- February 20 – Margot Grahame, actress (died 1982)
- March 3 – Jean Harlow, actress (died 1937)
- March 10 – Edward Norris, actor, (died 2002)
- March 18 – Smiley Burnette, actor, musician (died 1967)
- April 23 – Ronald Neame, cinematographer, producer and director (died 2010)
- May 7 – Ishirō Honda, director (died 1993)
- May 11
  - Louise Campbell, actress (died 1997)
  - Phil Silvers, actor (died 1985)
- May 17 – Maureen O'Sullivan, actress (died 1998)
- May 18 – Sigrid Gurie, actress (died 1969)
- May 23 - Bert Morrison, American actor, singer and jazz player (died 1995)
- May 27 – Vincent Price, actor (died 1993)
- May 30 – Douglas Fowley, actor (died 1998)
- June 1 – Gertrude Michael, actress (died 1964)
- June 3 – Ellen Corby, actress (died 1999)
- June 20 – Gail Patrick (died 1980)
- June 29 – Bernard Hermann, composer (died 1975)
- July 6 – Laverne Andrews, American singer, actress, member of Andrews Sisters (died 1967)
- July 14 – Terry-Thomas, British actor (died 1990)
- July 16 – Ginger Rogers, American actress, dancer (died 1995)
- July 18 – Hume Cronyn, Canadian actor (died 2003)
- July 19 – Loda Halama, Polish dancer and actress (died 1996)
- July 28 – Ann Doran, American actress (died 2000)
- August 2 – Ann Dvorak, American actress (died 1979)
- August 3 – Alex McCrindle, British actor (died 1990)
- August 5 – Robert Taylor, actor (died 1969)
- August 6 – Lucille Ball, actress (died 1989)
- August 7 – Nicholas Ray, director (died 1979)
- August 12 – Cantinflas, actor (died 1993)
- August 19 – Constance Worth, actress (died 1963)
- September 2 – Erwin Hillier, cinematographer (died 2005)
- September 10 – Renée Simonot, actress and voice artist (died 2021)
- October 13 – Ashok Kumar, actor, India (died 2001)
- October 20 – Will Rogers, Jr., actor (died 1993)
- October 27 – Leif Erickson, actor (died 1986)
- October 30 – Ruth Hussey, actress (died 2005)
- October 31 – Sheila Bromley, actress, (died 2003)
- November 5
  - Roy Rogers, singer, actor (died 1998)
  - Baby Marie Osborne, child actress (died 2010)
- November 10 – Harry Andrews, actor (died 1989)
- December 8 – Lee J. Cobb, actor (died 1976)
- December 9 – Broderick Crawford, actor (died 1986)
- December 23 – James Gregory, actor (died 2002)
- December 29 – Claire Dodd, actress (died 1973)
- December 30 – Jeanette Nolan, actress (died 1998)

== Deaths ==
- January 18 – Arthur Marvin, cinematographer, (born 1859)
- May 29 – W. S. Gilbert, producer of musicals, half of the team of Gilbert and Sullivan, (born 1836)
- July 18 – Genevieve Lantelme, actress, (born 1883)
- August 11 – Verner Clarges, actor, (born 1846)
- October 27 – Francis Boggs, director, (born 1870)
- November 2 – Kyrle Bellew, actor, (born 1855)
- December 22 – Wright Lorimer, stage actor, screenwriter, (born 1874)
- Unknown – Woodville Latham, producer and exhibitor whose desire to shoot an entire boxing match on a single reel of film led to the invention of the Latham loop (born 1837)

== Debuts ==
- Lionel Barrymore – The Battle (*debatable; film debut much earlier)
- Francis X. Bushman – His Friend's Wife (short)
- Paul Kelly – Jimmie's Job (short)
- Edgar Kennedy – Brown of Harvard
- Ann Little – The Indian Maiden's Lesson (short)
- Harold Lockwood – The White Red Man (short)
- Anna Q. Nilsson – Molly Pitcher (short)
- Anita Stewart – A Tale of Two Cities as Anna Stewart
- Lenore Ulric – The First Man (1911 short)
- Lois Weber – director, actress, A Heroine of '76 (short); writer, On the Brink (short)
