= List of Italian films of 1911 =

A list of films produced in Italy in 1911 (see 1911 in film):

Title	Director	Cast	Genre	Notes
1911
L' Adultera				
Aida				
Agrippina	Enrico Guazzoni	Adele Bianchi Azzarili, Amleto Novelli, Maria Caserini	Historical	Dramatization of Agrippina the Younger
Ali Babà				
The Fall of Troy	Giovanni Pastrone, Luigi Romano Borgnetto			
L'Inferno	Giuseppe de Liguoro	Salvatore Papa, Arturo Pirovano, Giuseppe de Liguoro, Augusto Milla		Adaptation of Dante Alighieri's The Divine Comedy
Mary Tudor	Giuseppe de Liguoro		Historical	
L'Odissea	Francesco Bertolini, Adolfo Padovan, Giuseppe de Liguoro	Giuseppe de Liguoro	Epic	
