= The Life and Deeds of the Immortal Leader Karađorđe =

1911 film by Ilija Stanojević

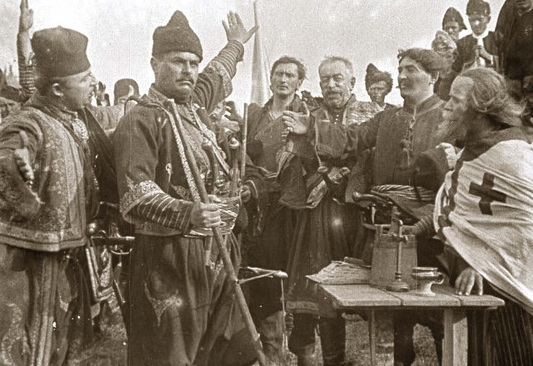
- A still frame from the film
- Directed by: Ilija Stanojević
- Written by: Ilija Stanojević; Ćira Manok "Savković"
- Produced by: Svetozar Botorić
- Starring: Milorad Petrović; Ilija Stanojević
- Cinematography: Louis de Beéry
- Production company: Pathé
- Distributed by: Svetozar Botorić
- Release date: October 1911
- Running time: Unclear
- Country: Serbia
- Language: Silent
- Budget: 20,000 dinars

The Life and Deeds of the Immortal Leader Karađorđe (Serbian: Живот и дела бесмртног вожда Карађорђа, romanized: Život i dela besmrtnog vožda Karađorđa), or simply Karađorđe (Serbian Cyrillic: Карађорђе), is a 1911 Serbian silent film directed by Ilija Stanojević and starring Milorad Petrović. It was the first feature film released in Serbia and the Balkans. Petrović portrays the eponymous rebel leader Karađorđe, who led the First Serbian Uprising of 1804–1813.

Karađorđe was first conceived by the aspiring film producer Svetozar Botorić, the owner of Serbia's first cinema. Following an unsuccessful attempt to secure government funding for the project, Botorić decided to personally finance the film. Actors from the National Theatre were cast in the leading roles. Botorić had worked with a cinematographer, Louis de Beéry, in the past for filming newsreels, and used him again. Principal photography ran through July and August 1911, and took place in and around Belgrade. The film was well received following its Belgrade premiere in October 1911. Although it was financially successful at home, Pathé opted not to distribute it abroad. The decision steered Botorić into precarious financial straits, as the film's domestic box office revenues were barely enough to cover the cost of production. After several further unsuccessful attempts at getting international distribution for his films, Botorić left the film industry altogether.

In 1928, Karađorđe was last screened to a group of Serbian émigrés living in the United States. The last known copy went missing in 1947 or 1948, and for many decades thereafter, the film was considered lost. In July 2003, a largely intact copy was discovered in Vienna by researchers from the Yugoslav Film Archive. The film was subsequently restored in time to be screened on the 200th anniversary of the outbreak of the First Serbian Uprising, in February 2004. The film underwent digital restoration in 2011; the digitally restored version of Karađorđe was subsequently screened on the 100th anniversary of its release. In December 2016, the Yugoslav Film Archive declared the film to be a piece of "cultural heritage of exceptional importance".

== Plot ==
The Life and Deeds of the Immortal Leader Karađorđe (1911)

The film opens with an adolescent Karađorđe (Milorad Petrović) killing an Ottoman official (Ilija Stanojević). The murder turns Karađorđe into a fugitive. Following an unsuccessful rebellion against the Ottomans, Karađorđe is forced to flee Serbia and seek refuge in the Austrian Empire, across the Sava River. When Karađorđe's stepfather threatens to expose Karađorđe's plans to the Ottomans, he kills him. After spending a period of time in Austria, Karađorđe returns to Serbia. In February 1804, following the Slaughter of the Knezes, surviving Serbian notables gather at the Orašac Assembly and decide to rebel against the Dahije, the renegade Janissaries who precipitated the massacre. The notables propose that Karađorđe lead the insurrection, given his prior military experience. He initially declines their offer, but ultimately relents; the First Serbian Uprising begins. The Dahije soon foresee their downfall, witnessing their fates reflected in a bowl of water drawn from the Danube.

Karađorđe defeats the Dahije, but ends up turning on the Sultan, who had earlier offered to support Karađorđe in his struggle against the rogue Janissaries. Karađorđe scores a string of victories against the Porte, routing the Ottomans at the Battle of Mišar, and eventually seizing Belgrade. The uprising continues for nearly a decade but is ultimately defeated and Karađorđe is forced to flee to Austria once again. In 1817, he decides to return to Serbia to lead a new rebellion. Karađorđe's chief rival, Miloš Obrenović, is made aware of this development. He arranges a meeting with Vujica Vulićević, an erstwhile friend of Karađorđe now on Obrenović's payroll, and orders that Karađorđe be killed. When Karađorđe returns to Serbia, Vulićević offers him a tent in a forest, and while he is sleeping, shoots and kills him with a rifle. The film ends with a passage from The Mountain Wreath, an epic poem written by Njegoš, the national poet of Serbia and Montenegro. The actors then perform a curtain call.

== Cast ==
- Milorad Petrović as Karađorđe, the leader of the First Serbian Uprising
- Ilija Stanojević as Vujica Vulićević, a sipahi and a sycophantic follower of Karađorđe
- Jevrem Božović as five different characters, including Karađorđe's father and Miloš Obrenović
- Sava Todorović as Mehmed-aga Fočić, one of the leaders of the Dahije
- Dragoljub Sotirović as Hajduk Veljko and Karađorđe's brother, Marinko
- Vukosava Jurković as Marica, Karađorđe's mother
- Dobrica Milutinović as Janko Katić, one of the organizers of the First Serbian Uprising
- Aleksandar Milojević as Mateja Nenadović, one of the leaders of the First Serbian Uprising
- Milorad Petrović as an adolescent Karađorđe

== Production ==
=== Origins ===
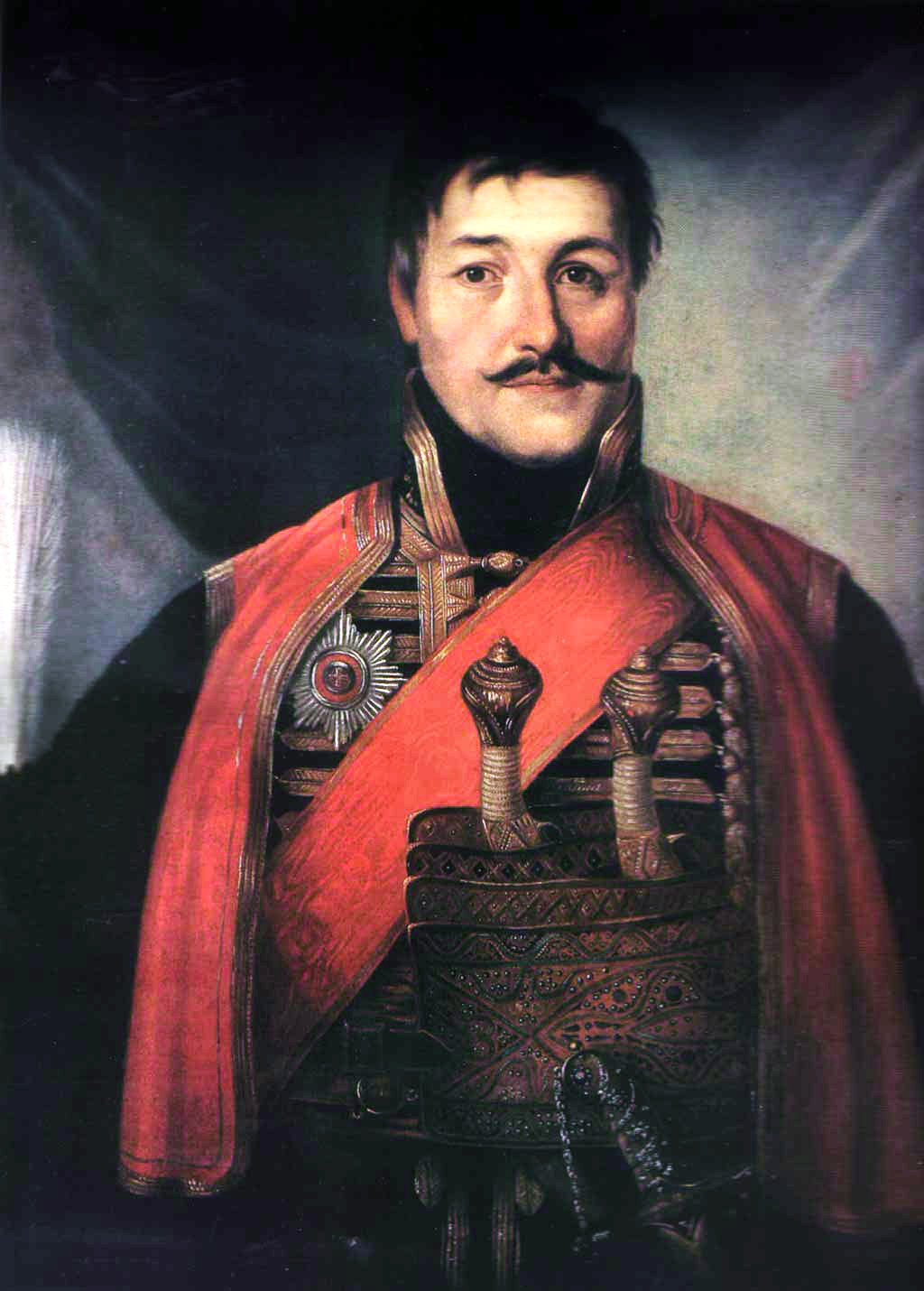
Portrait of Karađorđe by Vladimir Borovikovsky, c. 1816

Serbia's first movie theatre, the Paris Cinema, located inside the eponymous Hotel Paris, at Belgrade's Terazije Square, was opened by the hotelier Svetozar Botorić in December 1908. Up until that point, films could only be viewed in traveling theatres which periodically visited Serbia's large cities. Very few members of the country's intelligentsia considered cinema to have any cultural value and fewer still deemed it financially rewarding. Unlike many of his contemporaries, Botorić was convinced that film could be turned into a profitable endeavour. In 1909, he signed a contract with the French cinematographic firm Pathé, becoming their representative in Serbia and Bulgaria. In this capacity, he held exclusive Balkan premieres of Pathé's films in his hotel. Botorić also regularly produced newsreels about local events on Pathé's behalf, with the firm providing filming equipment and a cameraman (Louis de Beéry), and Botorić giving them a share of his admission profits. In 1911, Botorić teamed up with the prominent stage actor Ilija Stanojević to establish the Union for the Production of Serbian Films (Serbian: Udruženje za snimanje srpskih filmova).

Botorić was inspired to produce feature films after seeing Charles Le Bargy and André Calmettes's The Assassination of the Duke of Guise (French: L'Assassinat du Duc de Guise), an early example of narrative cinema. Up until that point, all films made in Serbia were documentary and ethnological films, covering events of historical significance such as official functions and state ceremonies to events of a more banal nature, such as common people on Belgrade's streets going about their daily lives. Immediately, Botorić came upon the idea of producing a film about the 19th-century revolutionary Karađorđe. The Karađorđević dynasty, with King Peter at its head, had returned to power in 1903 through a coup d'état, usurping the rival Obrenović dynasty. Owing to the violent nature of the coup, the Karađorđević dynasty faced several years of international isolation. Improving the royal family's public image abroad was thus made a priority. Botorić, who hoped to secure government funding for his future cinematic endeavors, thus felt that a feature film about Karađorđe would improve cinema's reputation domestically and increase its profile in the eyes of Serbia's leaders.

Karađorđe was based on a number of sources, namely an eponymous stage play by the playwright Miloš Cvetić, various biographies and hagiographies about the rebel leader, as well as the epic poem The Start of the Revolt Against the Dahijas (Serbian: Početak bune protiv dahija), which is traditionally attributed to the bard Filip Višnjić. The film's screenplay was written by Stanojević, Ćira Manok, (Note: Botorić and the bank clerk Manok were acquaintances and business associates. Manok also assisted Botorić with some of his other cinematic endeavors, and served as a liaison between Botorić and Pathé.) and an individual credited only by their surname, "Savković".

=== Casting and cinematography ===
In order to lend the project greater credibility, Botorić enlisted actors from the National Theatre for the film. Milorad Petrović, a veteran stage actor, was given the role of Karađorđe. The child actor who played the adolescent Karađorđe was coincidentally also named Milorad Petrović. Jevrem Božović played five different characters, including Karađorđe's father and Karađorđe's rival Miloš Obrenović. Sava Todorović was cast as Mehmed-aga Fočić, one of the leaders of the Dahije. Stanojević played Vulićević, as well as a sipahi and a sycophantic follower. Matija Nenadović was played by Aleksandar Milojević. The part of Hajduk Veljko was played by Dragoljub Sotirović, who also played the part of Karađorđe's brother Marinko. Dobrica Milutinović appeared on screen as the rebel leader Janko Katić. Vukosava Jurković played the role of Karađorđe's mother, Marica.

Karađorđe was directed by Stanojević. The film had a total budget of 20,000 dinars. Botorić had attempted to persuade the Royal Serbian Government to finance the film, but without success. Karađorđe was filmed in Belgrade and its environs. Principal photography lasted from mid-July to mid-August 1911. De Beéry, whom Botorić had employed to film newsreels in the past, was the film's cinematographer. Outdoor scenes, such as the ones depicting the Orašac Assembly and the Battle of Mišar, were shot on the banks of the Danube and the Sava, mostly at Ada Ciganlija, as well as at the Belgrade Fortress, Topčider park, and the Banjica forest. More than 1,000 extras were used. Indoor scenes were filmed at the Hotel Paris, with props and set pieces provided by the National Theatre. Once filming was complete, the negatives were sent to Paris to be developed by Pathé.

== Release ==
=== Contemporary reception ===
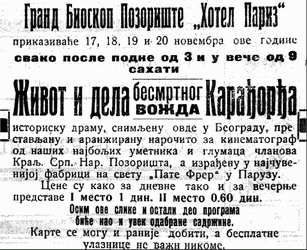
Contemporary newspaper advertisement

Karađorđe premiered at the Hotel Paris on 23 October [O.S. 10 October] 1911. This screening was attended only by members of the press. The same day, the film was screened before King Peter at what is now referred to as the Old Palace. It premiered before the general public on 30 November [O.S. 17 November] 1911, also at the Hotel Paris. Although officially titled The Life and Deeds of the Immortal Leader Karađorđe (Serbian: Život i dela besmrtnog vožda Karađorđa), the film was simply distributed as Karađorđe. It was the first feature film to be released in Serbia, as well as in the Balkans more broadly. (Note: The first feature film made on the territory of modern-day Serbia was Ernest Bošnjak's In the Kingdom of Tepsichore (Serbian: U carstvu Tepsihore), which was released in 1909. Because it was filmed in Vojvodina, in what was then Austria-Hungary, it is not considered the first Serbian feature film nor the first feature film from the Balkans. It is thought to be lost. Ulrich of Cilli and Ladislaus Hunyadi was filmed several months before Karađorđe, but because Karađorđe was the first to be released, it is considered the first Serbian feature.) (Note: The first feature film produced on the territory of modern-day Hungary, Today and Tomorrow (Hungarian: Ma és holnap), was released nearly a year later. The first Bulgarian feature film, Bulgaran is Gallant (Bulgarian: Българан е галант), premiered in 1915. The first Croatian feature film, Brcko in Zagreb (Croatian: Brcko u Zagrebu), was released in 1917.)

Karađorđe was a financial success domestically. A review published in the Belgrade daily Večernje novosti, dated 24 October [O.S. 11 October] 1911, states: "The picture was well choreographed, with clean camerawork. ... [I]t will cause a real sensation wherever it is shown." (Note: Serbian: Slika je izvedena vrlo lepo, čisto, bez ikakvog treperenja i svojom sadržinom izazvaće pravu senzaciju svuda gde se bude prikazivala.) Although successful domestically, Pathé refused to distribute the film abroad and reached a similar business decision with regard to its sister film, Ulrich of Cilli and Ladislaus Hunyadi (Serbian: Ulrih Celjski i Vladislav Hunjadi). Instead, Pathé opted for an ethnographic short whose subject was a Romani wedding at Ada Ciganlija, which became the first Serbian film to be screened abroad. (Note: Originally titled The Gypsy Wedding (Serbian: Ciganska svadba), the film was distributed in France as In Serbia: The Gypsy Marriage (French: En Serbie: Un mariage chez les Tziganes). It was well received, so much so that French audiences were "killing themselves with laughter", according to contemporary accounts.) Because Pathé had decided against distributing Karađorđe internationally, Botorić relied on the film's domestic box office revenue to recoup expenses, which it was barely able to cover.

Having invested significant amounts of time and money in feature films and receiving little in return, Botorić decided that they were not worth the effort. Commercial film production came to a virtual halt following the outbreak of World War I. During the Austro-Hungarian, German and Bulgarian invasion of Serbia in late 1915, Botorić was taken prisoner. He died in an Austro-Hungarian internment camp the following year. Stanojević was also apparently dissuaded from partaking in feature films and remained committed to theatrical performances for the remainder of his life. De Beéry resumed filming newsreels.

=== Rediscovery ===
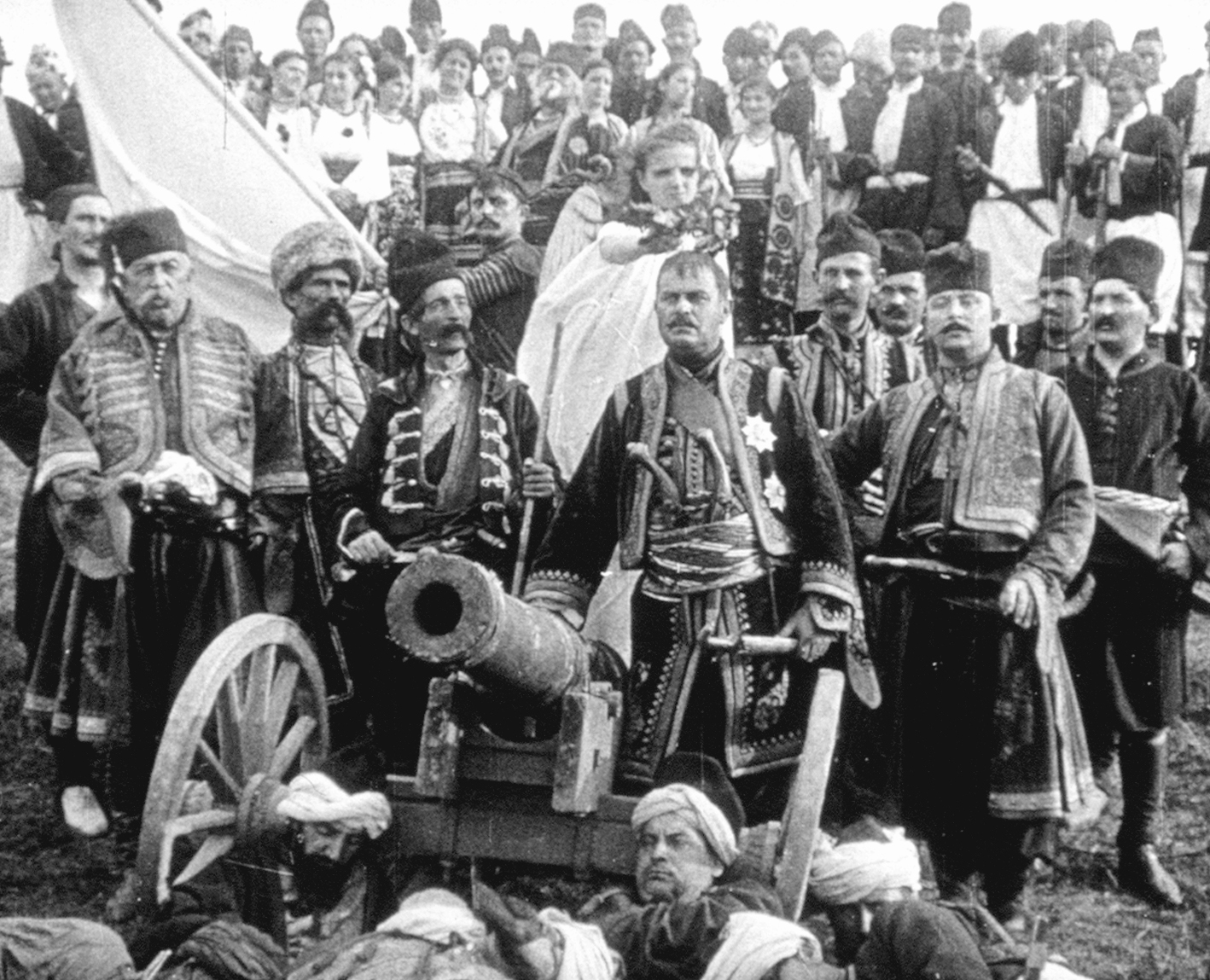
A still from the film depicting Karađorđe (centre) standing among his followers

The film was last screened before a group of Serbian émigrés in the United States in 1928. A copy of it existed in Belgrade until 1947 or 1948, when its owner tossed it into the Danube to avoid being persecuted by Yugoslavia's new communist government. (Note: The Karađorđević dynasty was removed from power during World War II and succeeded by a communist government led by Josip Broz Tito.) Film historians and archivists began searching for a surviving print of Karađorđe as early as 1963. In response to inquiries from the Yugoslav Film Archive, Pathé announced that it did not possess a film titled Karađorđe in its archives. It also stated that it had no record of a cinematographer named Louis de Beéry ever being on its payroll. In 1969, on behalf of the Yugoslav Film Archive, the film historian Dejan Kosanović examined the collection of the Cinémathèque Française in Paris, to no avail. In 1992, the premises of the Royal Compound in Belgrade's prestigious Dedinje neighbourhood were searched after a tip from Prince Tomislav, who stated that his father, King Alexander, once had a copy of the film in his possession and viewed it regularly. The search did not yield any results.

In the early 2000s, scholars from the Yugoslav Film Archive resumed their attempts to find a surviving print of the film. The effort was spearheaded by Aleksandar Erdeljanović and Radoslav Zelenović of the Yugoslav Film Archive. In the course of his research, Erdeljanović discovered that de Beéry was a Hungarian cinematographer, not a French one, whose real name was Lajos Zoltan Árpád Pitrolf, thus resolving the mystery of why Pathé did not have him listed on their payroll. In 2003, Erdeljanović came into contact with Nikolaus Wostry, the director of the Austrian Film Archive in Vienna. Wostry informed him that his institution was in possession of a number of early 20th century Serbian films, including a feature film. When Wostry described the contents of the feature, Erdeljanović became convinced that the Austrian Film Archive had a copy of Karađorđe in its possession. On 16 July 2003, Erdeljanović visited the Austrian Film Archive to view the footage for himself, after which he confirmed that the print in the archive's possession was in fact Karađorđe.

Damaged, but largely intact, the print was found among the effects of Ignaz Reinthaler, who had owned a cinema in Osijek before and during World War I, but relocated to Austria following Austria-Hungary's dissolution. It had been donated to the Austrian Film Archive by Reinthaler's widow more than twenty years earlier.

== Restoration ==
A storied institute with one of the largest film collections in the world, the Yugoslav Film Archive had been plagued by years of systematic neglect and a persistent lack of funds by the time of the film's rediscovery. The recovered print was mostly in good condition, with the exception of some sections damaged from exposure to the elements. (Note: Smither notes that some portions of the recovered print were plagued by significant nitrate deterioration and other imperfections.) Since the original running time of the film is unknown, it is unclear how much of it was recovered and how much remains missing. (Note: The recovered print was nearly 800 metres (2,600 ft) long. Erdeljanović estimated that the film was originally 1,800 metres (5,900 ft) long. He deemed between 80 and 90 percent of the recovered print to be salvageable. Scenes depicting Karađorđe's life between 1811 and 1817 were missing from the print. Due to continuity errors in the recovered print, most of the footage depicting the Battle of Mišar is also presumed lost. According to contemporary news reports, Karađorđe had a running time of 88 minutes. Contemporary documentary evidence suggests that it may have been closer to an hour in length, as evidenced by a note written by one of Crown Prince Alexander's adjutants at the film's royal premiere, where the screening is recorded as having taken place between 9:15 p.m. and 10:15 p.m.)

The restoration process experienced multiple hurdles. Erdeljanović had been given a VHS copy of the film and not the original film stock, which made the restoration process more difficult. Additionally, much of the footage was out of chronological order. According to Erdeljanović, the film's lack of intertitles posed the most significant challenge. Contemporary Serbian films did not contain intertitles. Instead, an "interpreter" would rise between rolls and explain to the audience what had transpired in the previous roll. Serbian films did not begin using intertitles until 1912, a year after the film's release. Upon discovering the literary and epic source material upon which the film was based, Erdeljanović and his colleagues at the Yugoslav Film Archive decided to write the intertitles themselves. The film was subsequently taken to a laboratory in Rome, where it was digitized.

The rediscovered footage was first screened to the public at the National Theatre on 14 February 2004, coinciding with the 200th anniversary of the start of the First Serbian Uprising. It was screened alongside an accompanying score created by the composer Vladimir Pejković. Later in 2004, the film was released on DVD by the Yugoslav Film Archive with separate Serbian and English menus, as well as intertitles in both languages. The DVD release also features a twenty-minute documentary chronicling the film's rediscovery.

In 2011, Karađorđe underwent digital restoration to mark the 100th anniversary of its release. Digitally restoring the film was an arduous and painstaking affair. "To restore 10 to 15 minutes of film can take two to three months," Erdeljanović said. The restoration process ultimately took more than a year. It was overseen by Erdeljanović, in his capacity as the head of the Yugoslav Film Archive. The film specialists Dubravko and Marija Badalić, Lazar Lisinac, Bojan Perković and Stevan Stanić also contributed their expertise. The digitally restored version of the film was ultimately released on DVD.

== Critical analysis ==
Karađorđe was one of many historical films produced in Europe at the beginning of the 20th century; it was thus a product of its time. Subjects such as the struggle against the Ottoman Empire would continue to dominate Serbian cinema for decades to come. The film historian Michael Stoil describes Karađorđe as a propaganda film designed to shore up support for the ruling Karađorđević dynasty. "[K]arađorđe and similar works were conceived as historical pageants rather than historical drama," Stoil writes. "They were celebrations of well-known leaders, events, and mass virtues, constituting appeals to enroll the Balkan masses in support of nationalism and the ruling dynasties, a recurrent theme among urban intelligentsia on the eve of the Balkan Wars and afterwards." The film scholar Vlastimir Sudar criticizes Stoil's take, because at the time it was written, Karađorđe had not been seen in decades. "From today's perspective, it is a static film d'art, a historical spectacle with tableaux vivants, mise-en-scène, and baroque, emotionally emphatic intertitles," the film scholar Nevena Daković writes. "Anticipating the wave of Serbian historical spectacles in the 1930s, the film fuels national sentiments and consciousness, celebrates national identity, and broadly participates in what Eric Hobsbawm has called "invention of the tradition" by glorifying and mythologizing a past that determines the shape of things to come."

Erdeljanović categorizes the extant portions of the film into 16 distinct episodes, eleven of which were shot outdoors and five of which were shot indoors. With the exception of the Battle of Mišar, the film's remaining scenes featured static camerawork, simple framing and no cuts. "Many scenes, particularly interiors, look "stagey" in the style familiar from much early cinema," the film scholar Roger Smither writes. "On the whole, action is filmed in medium shot, with next to no camera movement and no close-ups. Emotion is represented by grand gestures and frequent tableaux." Nonetheless, the academics Mira and Antonín J. Liehm believe that Karađorđe represented a "crossing of boundaries between stage and screen". As Sudar notes, earlier European films such as The Assassination of the Duke of Guise represented little more than filmed theatre performances. Smither praises the staging of the Battle of Mišar, in particular. "Such moments show real panache," he writes, "and give the film considerable interest in its own right, as well as the automatic value it has on account of its remarkable history."

== Legacy ==
Although the film was popular with the Serbian public, it failed to pique the interest of the country's leadership, and in subsequent years, the Royal Serbian Government offered virtually no financial support to Serbia's nascent film industry. Sudar writes that Botorić's attempts to transform the public's perception of cinema from "mindless entertainment" to a legitimate art form, though primarily motivated by the prospect of financial reward, "may now be perceived as noble". Prior to its rediscovery, Karađorđe—and early Serbian cinema more broadly—had generally been overlooked by academics and scholars, who were of the belief that such motion pictures were of little historical or cinematic value. "Once the film had been restored and screened," Sudar writes, "it was evident that it was advanced for its time."

In 2011, Serbia's national postal service, Pošta Srbije, released a postage stamp commemorating the film's release. In 2012, Karađorđe was unsuccessfully nominated for UNESCO's Memory of the World Register by the Yugoslav Film Archive. In December 2016, the Yugoslav Film Archive declared Karađorđe to be a piece of "cultural heritage of exceptional importance", leaving the decision to be ratified by the Ministry of Culture and Information and the National Assembly of Serbia.

== See also ==
- List of Serbian films
- List of rediscovered films
