= Jeanne Chasles =

French dancer

- performing Le Cygne
- Born: Jeanne Marguerite Chasles; 4 September 1869; Paris, France
- Died: 20 March 1939 (aged 69); Paris, France
- Occupations: dancer, instructor, choreographer
- Years active: 1888–1931
- Known for: collecting memorabilia on the history of dance

Jeanne Chasles (4 September 1869 – 20 March 1939) was a French dancer in the Belle Époque period who later became a noted choreographer for the Opéra Comique and dance instructor at the National Conservatoire. Interested in collecting memorabilia on the history of dance, her collection became an important part of the archives of the National Library of France. In 1931, she was honored as a knight in the Legion of Honour.

== Biography ==
Jeanne Marguerite Chasles was born on 4 September 1869 in Paris to Emilie Elisabeth (née Dornbret) and Auguste Alfred Chasles. She studied dance with Madame Mariquita and in 1888 made her debut at the Opéra-Comique as a petit sujet (minor soloist). She also danced at Dancer at the Gaîté Lyrique and at the Odéon-Théâtre de l'Europe. By 1898, Chasles had become head of employment for the Opéra-Comique and the following year, she became one of their principal dancers, soloing until 1910. Some of the other dancers she worked with included Régina Badet, Aïda Boni, Luz Chavita, Cléo de Mérode and Stacia Napierkowska. While still working as the employment manager at Opéra-Comique, she temporarily worked in the same capacity at the Gaîté Lyrique and then in 1909 began serving as the Director of Dance at the Comédie-Française. From 1916, she taught dance at the Conservatoire de Paris. In 1920, she replaced Madame Mariquita as the ballet mistress of the Opéra-Comique.

In 1910, Chasles arranged some of the dances for the production of Quo Vadis?, based on the novel of the same name at the Gaîté Lyrique. Three years later, she choreographed the opera Pénélope by Gabriel Fauré for the Théâtre des Champs-Élysées and later in 1913 she worked on a ballet based on Molière's Le Sicilien for Jacques Rouché at the Théâtre des Arts. Chasles’ choreography was unique in that it incorporated historical materials on dance from her private collection of dance-related engravings and documents. In 1923, she arranged a production for charity event based on a Renaissance entertainment featuring music created in the fifteenth century by Charles Lévadé. She prepared a revival of Les Indes galantes by Jean-Philippe Rameau in 1925 for the Opéra-Comique, her last year of choreographing for the Opéra-Comique.

In 1931, she was awarded the rank of knight in the National Order of the Legion of Honour.

== Death and legacy ==
Chasles died on 20 March 1939 in Paris. After her death, the collection of historic engravings and materials on the history of dance which Chasles had amassed were donated to the National Library of France.
