= Farewell, My Beautiful Naples =

Farewell, My Beautiful Naples may refer to:

- Farewell, My Beautiful Naples (1946 film), an Italian musical melodrama film
- Farewell, My Beautiful Naples (1917 film), an Italian silent romance film
