= Cécile Sorel =

French actress (1873–1966)

Comtesse de Ségur Cécile Sorel
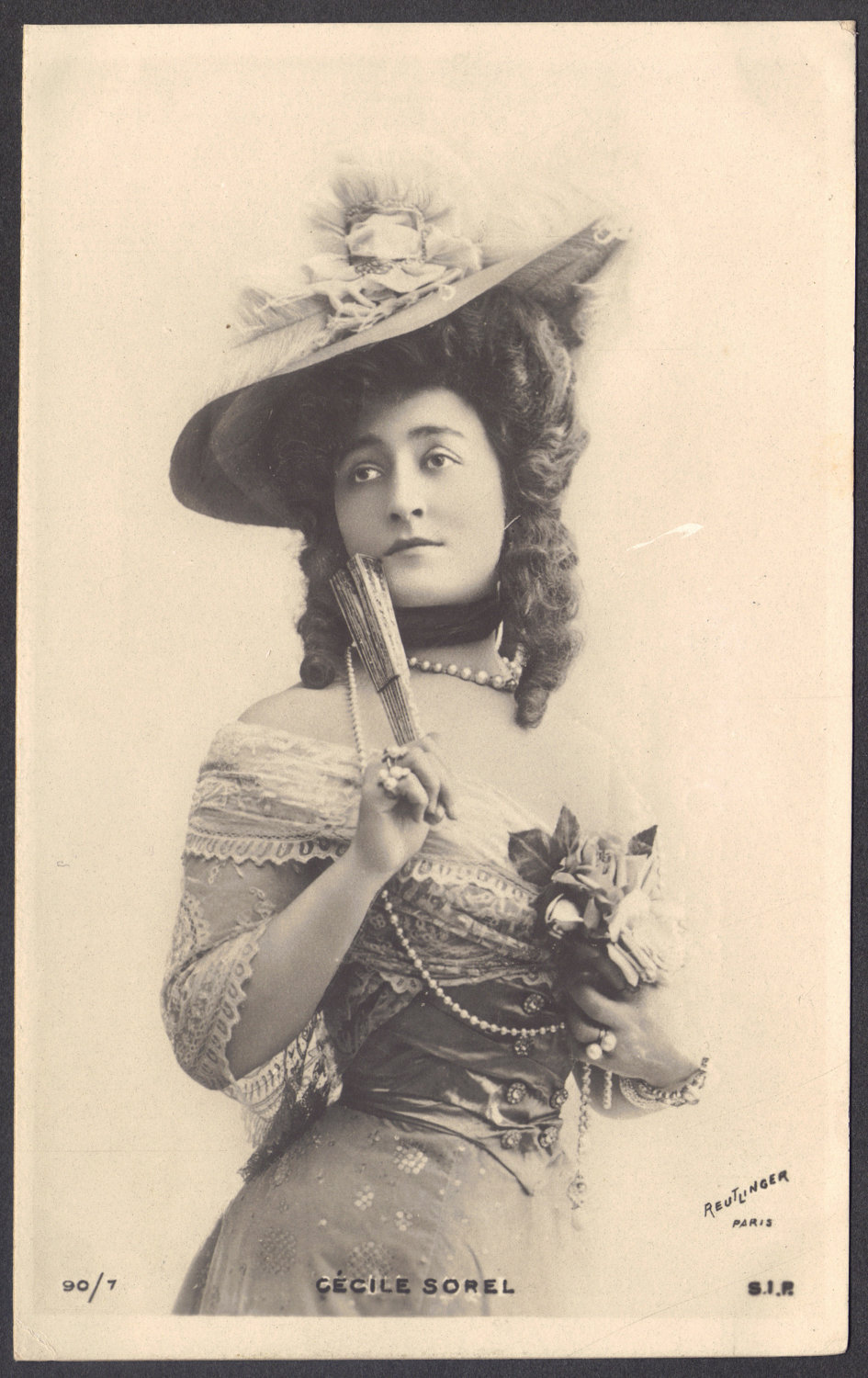
- A postcard bearing a portrait of Sorel by Léopold-Émile Reutlinger, c. 1900
- Born: Céline Émilie Seurre; 7 September 1873; Paris, France
- Died: 3 September 1966 (aged 92); Trouville-sur-Mer, France
- Resting place: Montparnasse Cemetery
- Other name: Soeur Cécile de l'Enfant-Jésus
- Occupation: Thespain
- Movement: Secular Franciscan Order
- Spouse: Guillaume de Sax
- Partner: Whitney Warren

Signature
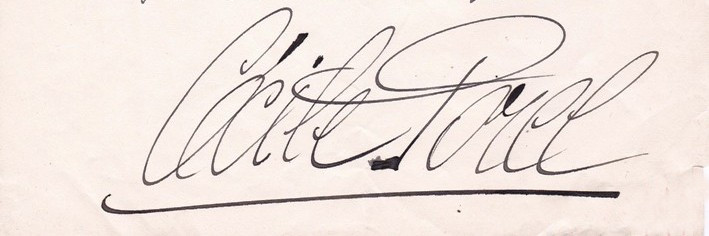

Céline Émilie Seurre (7 September 1873 – 3 September 1966), known as Cécile Sorel or the Comtesse de Ségur by marriage, was a French comic actress. She enjoyed great popularity and was known for her extravagant costumes.

== Biography ==
Sorel was attracted to the theater at an early age, studying with Louis-Arsène Delaunay and Marie Favart. In 1899, she began her career at the Odéon and then, in 1901, became a member of the Comédie-Française, where she specialized in playing a stock character known as the "grande coquette". She was especially well known for her portrayal of Célimène in The Misanthrope. In 1904, she became the 339th "Sociétaire de la Comédie-Française" and remained with the theater until 1933.

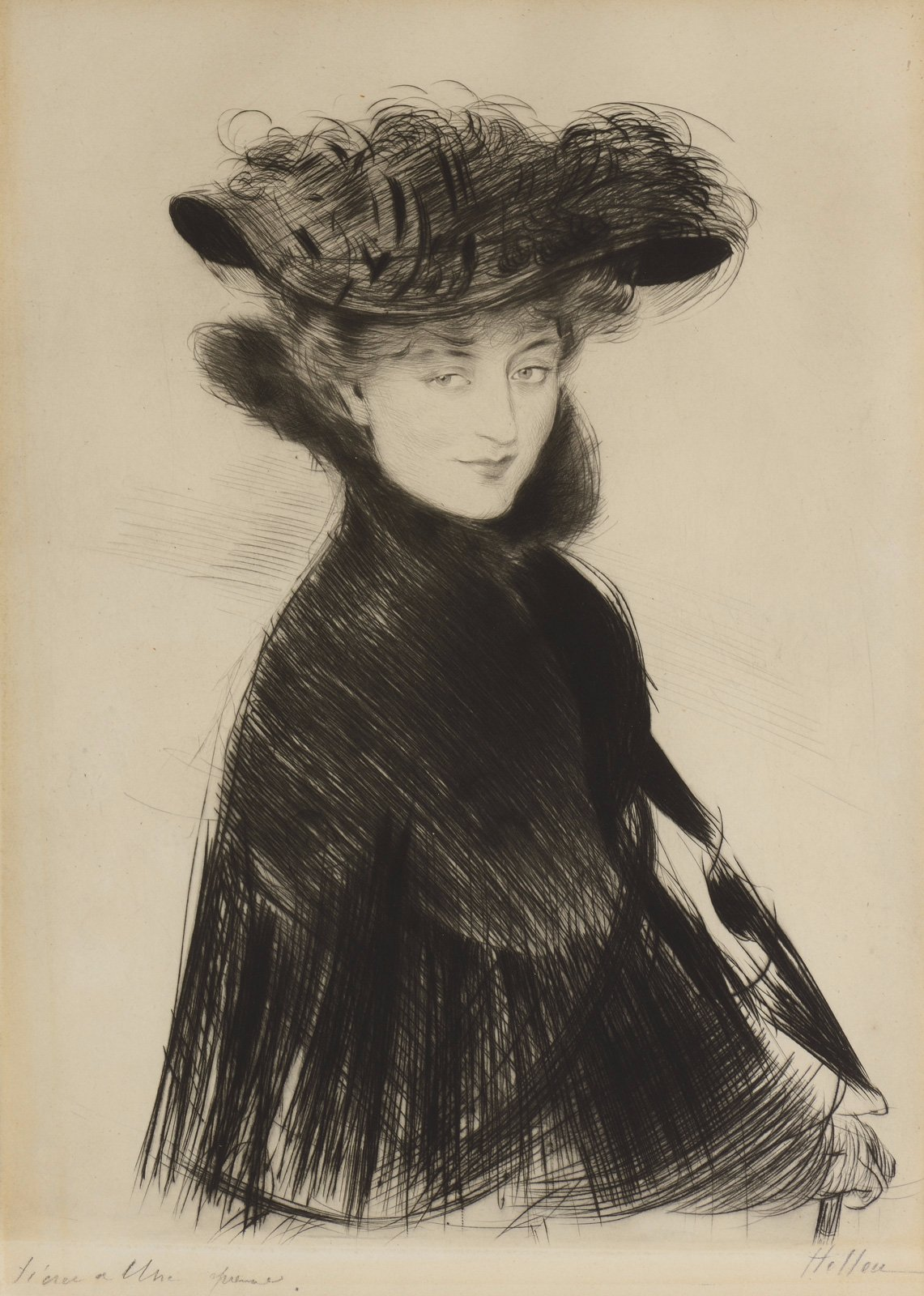
Cécile Sorel in a drypoint print by Paul César Helleu, 1898/99

She was implicated by rumour in the death (allegedly following sexual activity) of the President of the Republic, Felix Faure in February 1899, although the woman was more widely believed to be Faure's mistress, Marguerite Steinheil,

Although long engaged to Whitney Warren, an American architect who was related to the Vanderbilts, she eventually married the Comte de Ségur-Lamoignon, great grandson of the famous Comtesse de Ségur, who acted under the name Guillaume de Sax. They were sometimes mocked as "beauty and the beast" and were separated after fifteen years, but she kept the title of "Comtesse" for the rest of her life.

In 1909, she had the starring role in La Tosca, a film by André Calmettes and Charles Le Bargy. Her next film role did not come until 1937, when she played an aged courtesan in The Pearls of the Crown by Sacha Guitry. Four years later, she essentially played herself in a sketch comedy called Les Petits riens, written by and starring Yves Mirande. In 1944, she barely escaped the bombing that destroyed the Théâtre-Français in Rouen.

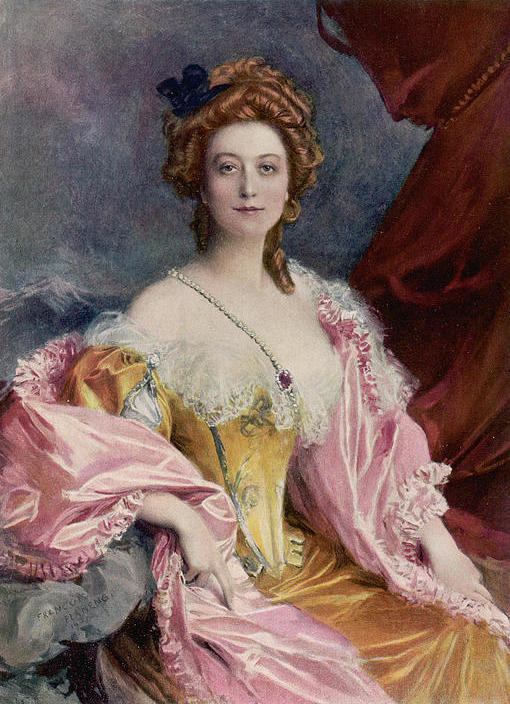
Cecile Sorel by François Flameng c. 1903

In 1950, she underwent a "conversion" and, following the lead of the original Comtesse de Ségur, took her vows as a Third-order Franciscan. She adopted the name "Soeur Cécile de l'Enfant-Jésus" and devoted her time to writing. A television documentary of her career was produced in 1965. She died, four days before her 93rd birthday, of complications from a fractured hip, suffered in a fall at her rented château on the French coast, and was buried in the Cimetière du Montparnasse.

She was painted by François Flameng and her likeness appears in a fresco by Charles Hoffbauer on the ceiling of the cupola at the Château d'Artigny in Montbazon, once owned by François Coty. A college in the town of Mériel is named after her.

Liane de Pougy (1869-1950)'s diaries from 1919 to 1941, published as Mes cahiers bleus in French in 1977, and My Blue Notebooks in English in 1979, describe her.
