= List of French films of 1911 =

A list of films produced in France in 1911.

| Title | Director | Cast | Genre | Notes |
|---|---|---|---|---|
| L'Abîmee | Georges Denola | Mistinguett, Jean Dax | Short | |
| The Academy Boy | | | | |
| L'Accident | | | | |
| An Aerodynamic Disaster | | | | |
| L'Affaire d'Excelsior Park | | | | |
| Africa | | | | |
| Agénor, cavalier de deuxième classe | | | | |
| Ah! Quel plaisir d'avoir un chien! | | | | |
| A Loner at Night | | | | |
| An Amateur Skater | | | | |
| The Ambitious Bootblack | | | | |
| L'Amie de l'orphelin | | | | |
| Les Aventures de baron de Munchhausen | Georges Méliès | | Short | |
| La Digue | Abel Gance | Robert Lévy, Paulette Noizeux, Pierre Renoir, Jean Toulout | Short | |
| The Hunchback of Notre Dame | Albert Capellani | Henry Krauss, Stacia Napierkowska | Drama | |
| L'Inutile Sacrifice | Clément Maurice | | | |

== See also ==
- 1911 in France
