= Luz Chavita =

Spanish dancer

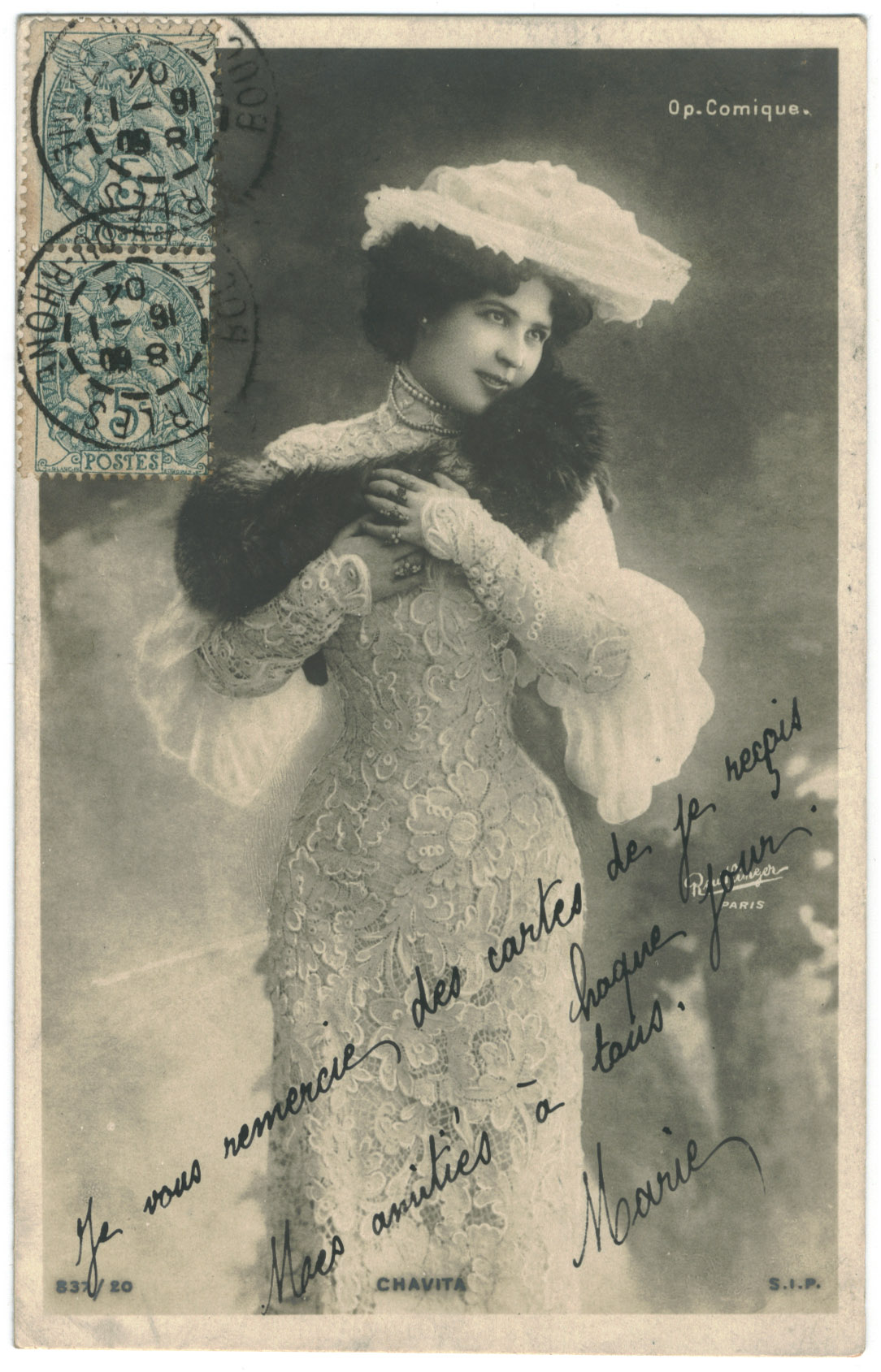
- Chavita photographed by Léopold-Émile Reutlinger
- Born: Luisa Lacalle; 1880; Jerez de la Frontera, Spain
- Died: Unknown
- Other names: Luisa De la Calle, Lulu
- Occupation: Dancer
- Years active: 1894–1908

Luisa Lacalle (1880–?), known professionally as Luz Chavita, was a Spanish dancer who gained international fame during the Belle Époque and was a leading dancer in Paris before returning to Spain to become an entrepreneur.

== Biography ==
Luisa Lacalle was born in 1880 in Jerez de la Frontera, Spain to a poor family originally from Seville. Showing promise for dancing at an early age, she began taking dancing classes with Juana la Macarrona. By the time she was fourteen, Lacalle was dancing professionally using the artistic name Lulu or Luz Chavita. Having gained a reputation for her talent, she moved to Paris with a letter for introduction for the Count de Pradere (also known as Daniel de Carbalho y de Prat). Pradere introduced her to Antonin Perivier and Fernand de Rodays, the directors of the newspaper Le Figaro. The pair frequently gave entertainments for aristocratic subscribers and invited Chavita to appear. Almost overnight, she became a sensation and was proclaimed as a new star.

Before her official debut, Chavita studied with Madame Mariquita, where she studied for the next two years. Soon after, she had her official debut at La Scala and from there she went to the Folies Bergère, where she was hired along with Juanita de Frezia, La Belle Gerrero, and Mlle Hernandez, to dance their Spanish repertoire which showed off their décolletage and bare legs. She toured Europe, visiting Berlin, Budapest, London, Vienna and other major cities and then was engaged at El Alcázar in Marseille. By 1898, she was among the soloists performing at the Ballet de l'Opéra Comique along with such dancers as Régina Badet, Aïda Boni, Jeanne Chasles, Cléo de Mérode and Stacia Napierkowska. The theater soon earned the reputation as the "most artistic of Paris".

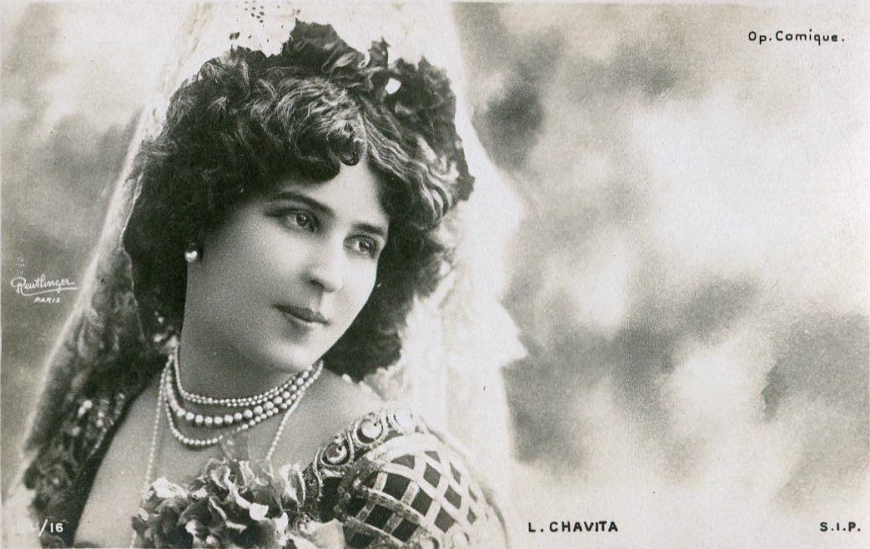
Luz Chavita by Reutlinger

At another of Le Figaro′s entertainments in 1899, Chavita enhanced her fame even more. The newspaper had sided with Alfred Dreyfus and agreed to publish documents which would impact the government handling of the Dreyfus affair. The police planned a raid to confiscate the documents, but when they arrived, Chavita began her performance, delaying the search until the documents could be safely hidden. The story was retold in newspapers ranging from Madrid to the United States. Other noted performances at the Opéra-Comique were her portrayal of Carmen in 1901 and in la Danse au temps de Gavarni (The Dance in the Time of Gavarni) in 1903 in which her polka was called exquisite.

Chavita saved all of her earnings, investing them carefully, and announced her retirement from the stage in 1905. She reconfirmed she was leaving Paris in 1908 and returned to Seville, where she bought real estate on Santa Clara Street, and later another house on Goyonetta Street. She outfitted her homes with modern refinements from Paris, took care of her parents in their old age, and purchased a vineyard in Jerez, which she administered for many years.

== Death and legacy ==
Chavita's death date is unknown. In 1905, the ceiling of Paillard Restaurant of Paris, where aristocrats and royalty gathered to dine was painted with a tribute called Women of the Twentieth Century by Lucien-Victor Guirand de Scévola. Chavita's was one of the likenesses that was included.
