= La Tosca (1909 film) =

- Directed by: André Calmettes; Charles le Bargy
- Written by: André Calmettes
- Based on: The 1887 play La Tosca by Victorien Sardou
- Release dates: March 15, 1909 (Paris, Cinéma Omnia Pathé); June 9, 1909 (US)
- Country: France
- Language: French

La Tosca is a 1909 French film directed by André Calmettes and Charles le Bargy.

== Cast ==
- Cécile Sorel: Floria Tosca, a famous opera singer
- René Alexandre: Mario Cavaradossi, a painter and supporter Bonapartist her young lover
- Charles le Bargy: the Baron Scarpia, the ruthless police chief of Rome
- Charles Mosnier: Cesare Angelotti, the leader of the opposition arrested by Scarpia
