= Film d'art =

French movement of early narrative films

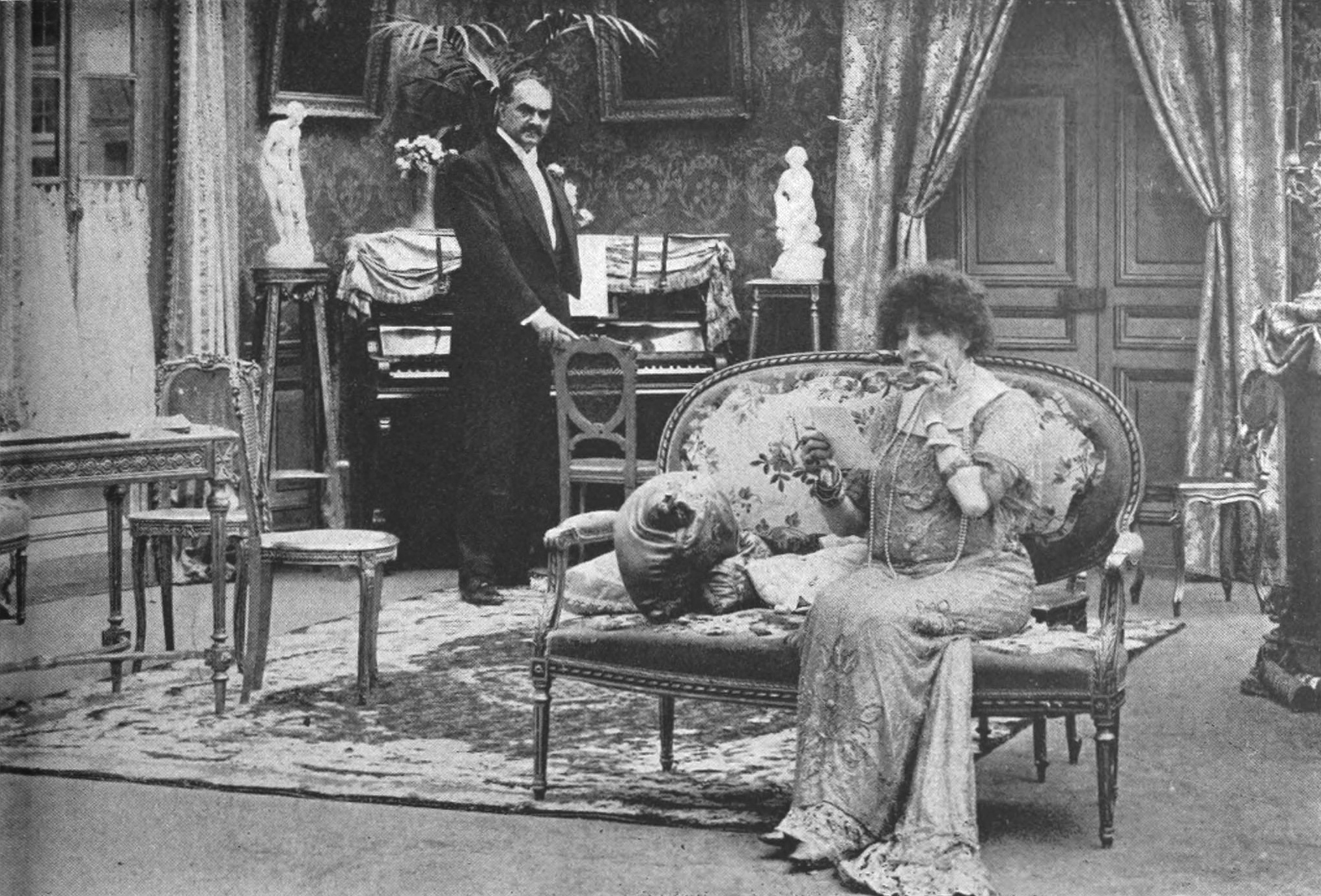
- A still from La Dame aux Camélias (1911) by Albert Capellani, with actress Sarah Bernhardt.
- Years active: Late 1900s–early 1910s
- Location: France
- Major figures: André Calmettes; Charles Le Bargy; Albert Capellani
- Influences: French theatre
- Influenced: Narrative cinema

Film d'art (French for "art film") was an influential film movement or genre that developed in France prior to World War I and began with the release of L'Assassinat du duc de Guise (1908), directed by Charles Le Bargy and André Calmettes of the Comédie Française for the Société Film d'Art, a company formed to adapt prestigious theatre plays starring famous performers to the screen. The success of L'Assassinat du duc de Guise inspired other companies to make similar films, initiating the film d'art movement. Among them were Pathé, which started a film d'art division called Société Cinématographique des Auteurs et des Gens de Lettres (SCAGL). Examples of films d'art include Calmettes's La Duchesse de Langeais (1910) and La Dame aux Camélias (1912), and Albert Capellani's Notre-Dame de Paris (1911) and Les Misérables (1913).

The movement was the most serious attempt to relate cinema to forms of high culture such as literature and theater, since up to that time cinema was seen as a simple popular entertainment characterized by spectacle. Despite its high intellectual aspirations, film d'art was characterized by its limited narrative execution, as the works were simply filmed theatrical productions. Despite its technical limitations and short-lived popularity, the movement was highly influential and instrumental in the rise of feature films and narrative cinema, as opposed to the cinéma d'attractions (English: "cinema of attractions"). The movement created a demand for more developed storylines and greater production values, and also made the practice of listing credits more widespread, as they advertised the presence of well-known stage actors. The influence of film d'art resulted in the birth of narrative cinema in other countries, as in the case of Argentina with the work of Mario Gallo.
