= Ubaldo Maria Del Colle =

Italian actor and film director (1883–1958)

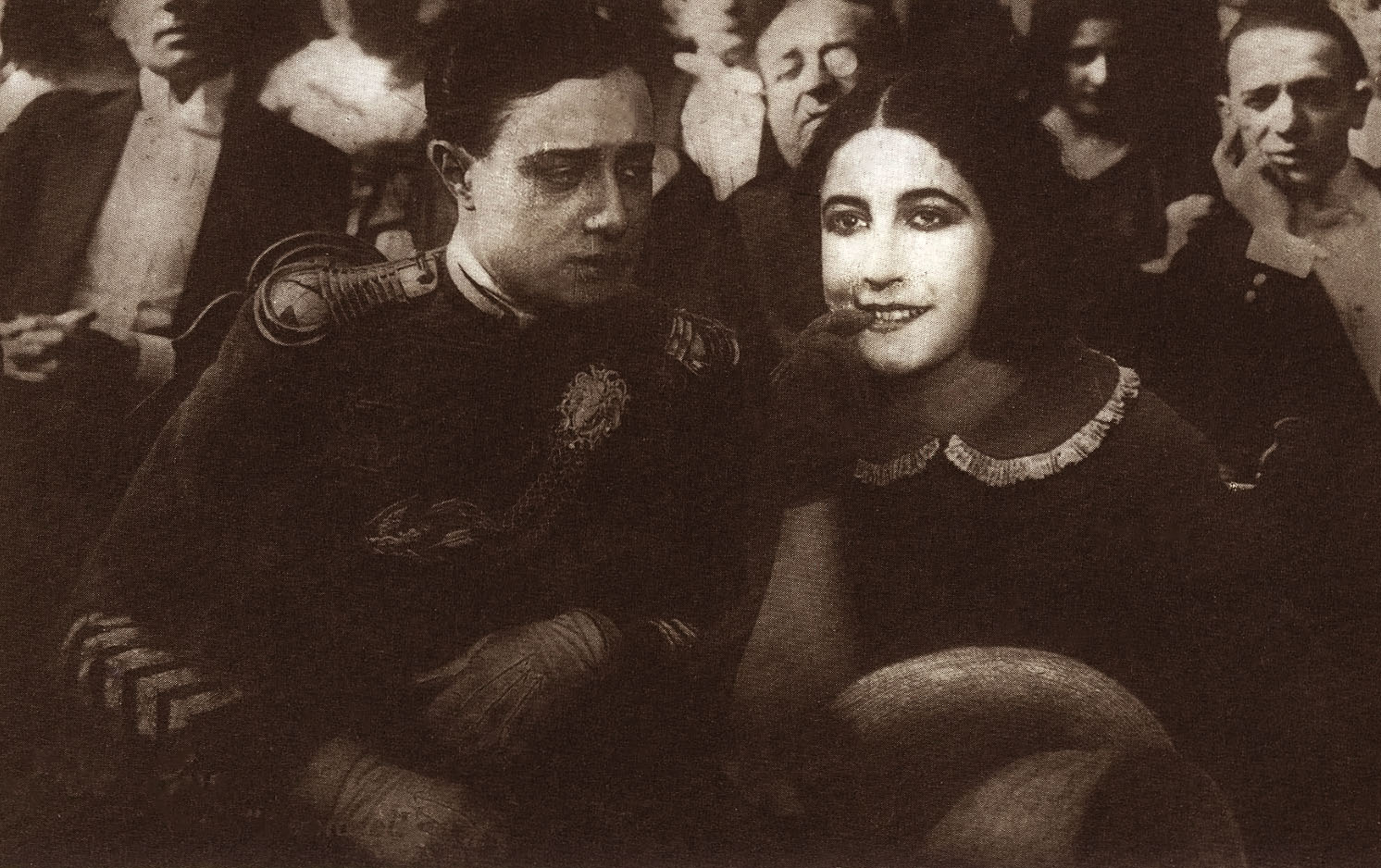
- Del Colle with Leda Gys
- Born: 27 June 1883; Rome, Kingdom of Italy
- Died: 24 August 1958 (aged 75); Rome, Italy
- Occupations: Actor; Film director
- Years active: 1911–1952
- Notable work: Jone or the Last Days of Pompeii

Ubaldo Maria Del Colle (27 June 1883 – 24 August 1958) was an Italian actor and film director. He directed more than one hundred films from 1911 to 1952.

== Biography ==
Ubaldo Maria Del Colle was born in Rome on 27 June 1883. He began his theatrical career in 1903 with the Fumagalli-Franchini company. Two years later, he made his film debut as the lead in the first Italian feature film, La presa di Roma, produced by Alberini & Santoni.

He later returned to the stage, but continued to work in film, starring in three Cines shorts, including Otello directed by Mario Caserini (1906). From 1910 onwards, he devoted himself entirely to film, quickly becoming one of Italy's most prolific and famous actor-directors of the silent era. Del Colle worked as an actor, director and screenwriter on several films for various companies, including Pasquali Film, Savoia Film, Genova Film, Lombardo Film, Any Film and Miramare Film. He starred in several movies, including L'Odissea (1911), Mimì Fanfara (1920) and I figli di nessuno (1921). He was also a producer, founding Riviera Films in Genoa in 1913 (which produced four films before becoming Del Colle Film) and Napoletan Film in Naples in 1927. He abandoned filmmaking in the late 1920s, and in the following years, opened a cinema in Rapallo.

Del Colle resumed his film career in 1951 as assistant director to Raffaello Matarazzo on the film I figli di nessuno, and in 1952, he directed his final film, Falsehood.

== Selected filmography ==
- L'Odissea (dir. Francesco Bertolini, Adolfo Padovan and Giuseppe De Liguoro, 1911), as actor
- Jone or the Last Days of Pompeii (1913)
- ...La bocca mi bacio tutto tremante (1919)
- Tragic Carnival (1924)
- New Moon (1925)
- Star of the Sea (1928)
- Falsehood (1952)
