= Ernesto Maria Pasquali =

Italian film director and film producer

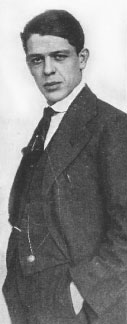
- Born: 1883; Montù Beccaria, Lombardy, Italy
- Died: 9 May 1919 (aged 35–36); Turin, Piedmont, Italy
- Occupations: Producer, director
- Years active: 1909–1919 (film)

Ernesto Maria Pasquali (1883 – 9 May 1919) was an Italian pioneering film producer and director. Originally a journalist he was employed by Ambrosio Film before he set up the Turin-based Pasquali Film, one of Italy's leading production companies.

== Biography ==
Ernesto Maria Pasquali was born in Piacenza into a middle-class family. Following his mother's premature death, his father sent him to a boarding school in Aosta. In 1896, Pasquali moved to Turin to live with his uncle, Ernesto Pasquali, a member of Italian Parliament and philanthropist. During this time, he attended an accounting school and developed a passion for theatre.

He embarked on a short-lived career in journalism, working for various newspapers in Turin and Piacenza, including the Gazzetta del Popolo. He was renowned for his brilliant, ironic and perceptive writing about the cultural and social life of Turin.

Following a brief career as a playwright, he started working as a scriptwriter and director for Ambrosio Film, one of Italian leading film companies at the time. In 1908, Pasquali left Ambrosio Film. After a brief period at Aquila Films, he founded his own production company, Pasquali & Co., better known as Pasquali Film.

Production began in 1908 with a series of adaptations of famous literary works, such as Ettore Fieramosca (1909), for which Pasquali – who was also the director – hired over two hundred extras. In the 1910s Pasquali produced a series drama films such as Zazà (1910), Calvario (1911), L'uragano (1911), and Fiore perverso (1913). In 1911, Pasquali was elected president of the Unione Italiana Cinematografisti (UIC), further consolidating his position within the Italian film industry.

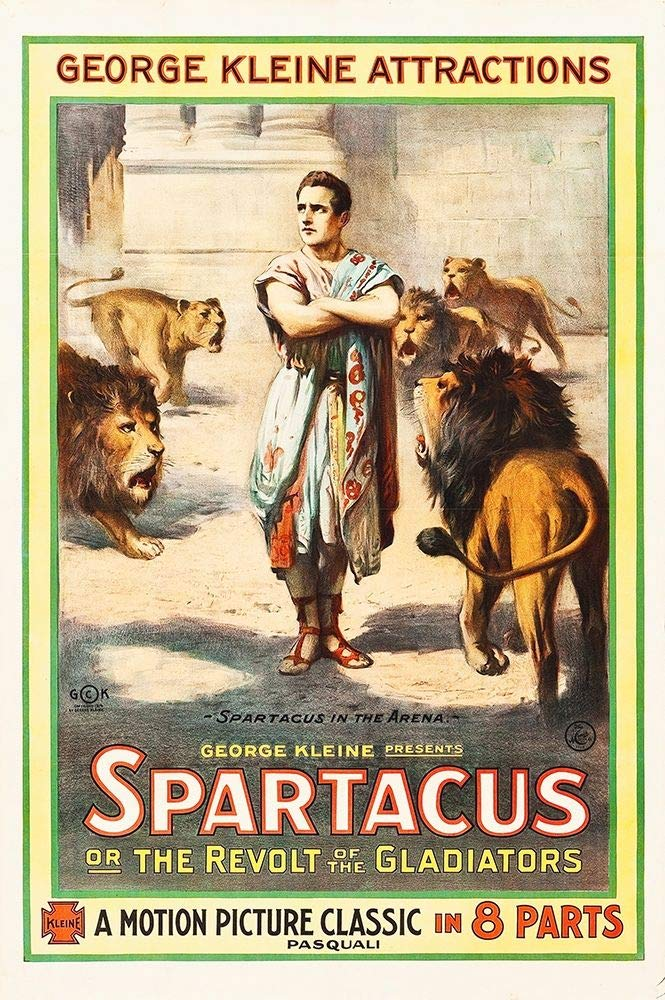
Poster to the US theatrical release of Vidali's Spartaco, produced by Pasquali

Pasquali hired several young, promising directors to work on his films, including Ubaldo Maria Del Colle, Giovanni Enrico Vidali and Umberto Paradisi. Del Colle became the company's leading director, achieving great success with a series of crime films inspired by American cinema. The company's films starred major Italian actors of the period, such as Lydia De Roberti, Gustavo Serena, Mary Cleo Tarlarini and Alberto Capozzi. Pasquali also hired the famous French comic actors Ferdinand Guillaume and André Deed.

Pasquali entered into direct competition with the other two major Italian film studios: Ambrosio Film and Itala Film. In response to the successful historical epics produced by his competitors, he produced Vidali's Spartaco (1913) and Jone or the Last Days of Pompeii, which was released the same year as Ambrosio's The Last Days of Pompeii. With Salambo (1914), a blockbuster directed by Domenico Gaido, Pasquali attempted to capitalise on the success of Cabiria, directed earlier that year by Giovanni Pastrone.

With the outbreak of World War I, Pasquali's production declined due to the crisis in the European film industry and intense competition from American cinema. In 1916, his shareholders sold him their shares, leaving him alone at the helm of the company.

Pasquali died at the age of just 36 from a grave illness in his Turin home. According to newspaper reports, he was still working on his latest project just months before his death. Pasquali Film continued to operate under the direction of Mario Donn after Pasquali's death in 1919, but was subsumed into the larger Unione Cinematografica Italiana conglomerate the following year. It produced films for UCI until its collapse in 1924.

== Bibliography ==
- Abel, Richard (2005). Encyclopedia of Early Cinema. New York: Taylor & Francis. ISBN 978-0415234405.
- Brunetta, Gian Piero (2009). The History of Italian Cinema: A Guide to Italian Film from Its Origins to the Twenty-first Century. Princeton: Princeton University Press. ISBN 978-0691119885.
