= Jone or the Last Days of Pompeii =

Ultimi giorni di Pompei, Gli
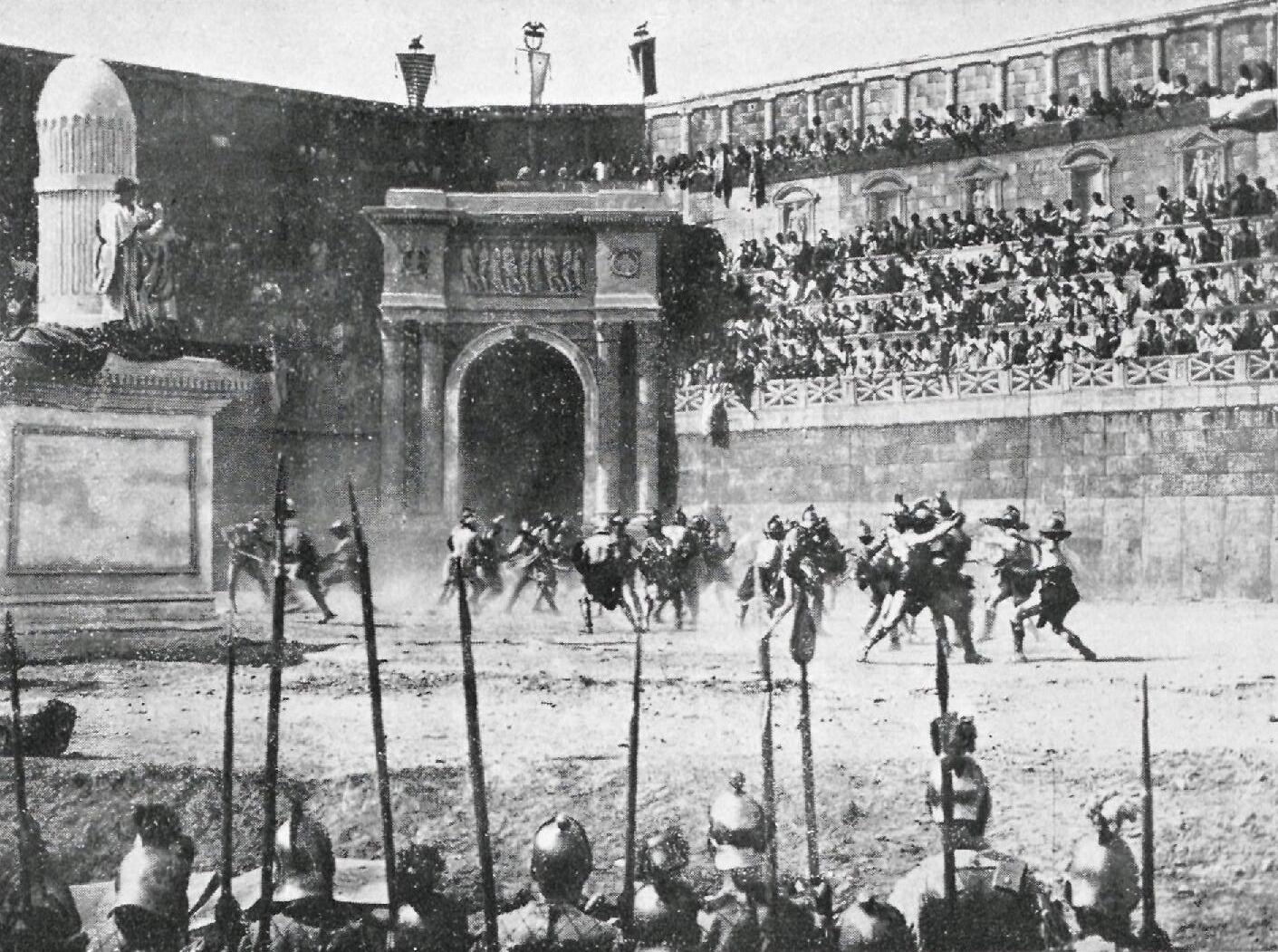
- One of the massive film sets in Ione o gli ultimi giorni di Pompei (1913)
- Directed by: Ubaldo Maria Del Colle; Giovanni Enrico Vidali
- Based on: The Last Days of Pompeii; 1834 novel by Edward Bulwer-Lytton
- Produced by: Ernesto Maria Pasquali
- Starring: Cristina Ruspoli; Luigi Mele; Giovanni Enrico Vidali; Suzanne De Labroy
- Cinematography: Raimondo Scotti
- Music by: Colombino Arona
- Distributed by: Monopolio Lombardo
- Release date: 26 August 1913
- Running time: 95 minutes
- Country: Italy
- Language: Silent

Ione o gli ultimi giorni di Pompei is a 1913 Italian film. Based on Edward Bulwer-Lytton's 1834 novel of the same name, the film - one of two different adaptations of the same book in Italy that year - is set during the final days leading up to the Mount Vesuvius eruption in Pompeii in 79 AD.

== Plot ==
In Pompeii in 79 AD Glaucus and Jone are in love with each other. Arbax, the Egyptian High Priest, is determined to conquer her. Glaucus buys the blind slave Nydia who is mishandled by her owner.

Nydia falls in love with him and asks Arbax for his help. He gives her a potion to make Glaucus fall in love with her. Unfortunately, to Nydia's dismay, the potion is actually a poison which will destroy his mind. Arbax' disciple Apoecides threatens to reveal publicly his wrongdoings. Arbax kills him and accuses Glaucus of the crime. He locks Nydia in a cellar to prevent her from speaking.

Glaucus is condemned to be thrown to the lions. Nydia manages to escape and tells Glaucus' friend Claudius what happened. Claudius rushes to the Circus to accuse Arbax and the crowd decides that Arbax and not Glaucus should be thrown to the lions.

The Vesuvius starts erupting and a widespread panic ensues. Under the shock, Glaucus recovers his mind. Blind Nydia, the only one to find her way in the darkness caused by the rain of ashes, leads Glaucus and Jone to safety and finds peace by drowning herself.

== Cast ==
- Suzanne De Labroy as Nydia
- Cristina Ruspoli as Jone
- Luigi Mele as Glaucus
- Giovanni Enrico Vidali as Arbaces
- Michele Cuisa as Caleno
- Ines Melidoni as Julia

== Production ==
The film was produced by Pasquali Film.
