= Louis de Beéry =

Hungarian cinematographer

Lajos Zoltan Árpád Pitrolf (born 13 October 1879), known professionally as Louis de Beéry, was a Hungarian cinematographer who was active in the Balkans in the early 20th century. In 1909, his employees, the French cinematographic firm Pathé, offered his services to their business partner, the Serbian entrepreneur and movie theatre owner Svetozar Botorić, who had express interest in producing films of his own. In 1911, de Beéry worked as the cinematographer on The Life and Deeds of the Immortal Leader Karađorđe, the first feature film released in Serbia and the Balkans.
