= ...La bocca mi bacio tutto tremante =

- Directed by: Ubaldo Maria Del Colle
- Cinematography: Giacomo Verrusio
- Production company: Tina Film
- Distributed by: Tina Film
- Release date: 1 September 1919 (Italy)
- Country: Italy
- Language: Silent

...La bocca mi bacio tutto tremante (English: He Kissed My Mouth All Trembling) is an Italian black-and-white silent film. It was released in September 1919 by director Ubaldo Maria Del Colle. The name comes from Inferno (Dante).

== Cast ==
- Ubaldo Maria Del Colle
- Tina Kassay
- Luciano Molinari
- Tina Somma
