= Falsehood (1952 film) =

1952 film

- Poster
- Directed by: Ubaldo Maria Del Colle
- Written by: Decio Fittaioli; Alessandro De Stefani; Basilio Franchina; Ubaldo Maria Del Colle
- Produced by: Giuseppe Bordogni
- Starring: Yvonne Sanson; Irène Galter; Alberto Farnese
- Cinematography: Rodolfo Lombardi
- Edited by: Mario Serandrei
- Music by: Michele Cozzoli
- Production companies: Titanus; Labor Film
- Distributed by: Titanus
- Release date: 27 September 1952
- Running time: 98 minutes
- Country: Italy
- Language: Italian

Falsehood (Italian: Menzogna) is a 1952 Italian melodrama film directed by Ubaldo Maria Del Colle and starring Yvonne Sanson, Irène Galter and Alberto Farnese. It was shot at the Titanus Studios in Rome. The film's sets were designed by the art director Ottavio Scotti.

== Cast ==
- Yvonne Sanson as Luisa Sanni
- Irène Galter as Mariella
- Alberto Farnese as Gianni
- Folco Lulli as Rocco
- Mario Ferrari as Padre di Mariella
- Emma Baron as Maddalena
- Enrica Dyrell as Capena
- Tino Carraro as Fabrizio
- Gualtiero Tumiati as Don Clemente
- Enrico Olivieri as Cucciolo
- Carletto Sposito as Brigadiere Oriani
- Virgilio Riento as Brigadiere Sante
- Roberto Murolo as Il pescatore cantante
- Carlo Sposito as Il brigadiere Oriani

== Bibliography ==
- Bayman, Louis (2014). The Operatic and the Everyday in Post-war Italian Film Melodrama. Edinburgh University Press. ISBN 978-0-7486-5642-4.
