= Tragic Carnival =

1924 film

- Directed by: Ubaldo Maria Del Colle
- Starring: Ubaldo Maria Del Colle
- Cinematography: Alfredo Di Fede
- Production company: Any-Film di Vincenzo Pergamo
- Distributed by: Any-Film di Vincenzo Pergamo
- Release date: December 1924
- Country: Italy
- Languages: Silent; Italian intertitles

Tragic Carnival (Italian: Carnevale tragico) is a 1924 Italian silent film directed by Ubaldo Maria Del Colle.

== Cast ==
- Elisa Cava
- Alberto Danza
- Ubaldo Maria Del Colle
- Ugo DeStefano
- Tina Somma

== Bibliography ==
- Tatti Sanguineti. L'anonimo Pittaluga: tracce, carte, miti. Transeuropa, 1998.
