= The Assassination of the Duke of Guise =

L'Assassinat du duc de Guise
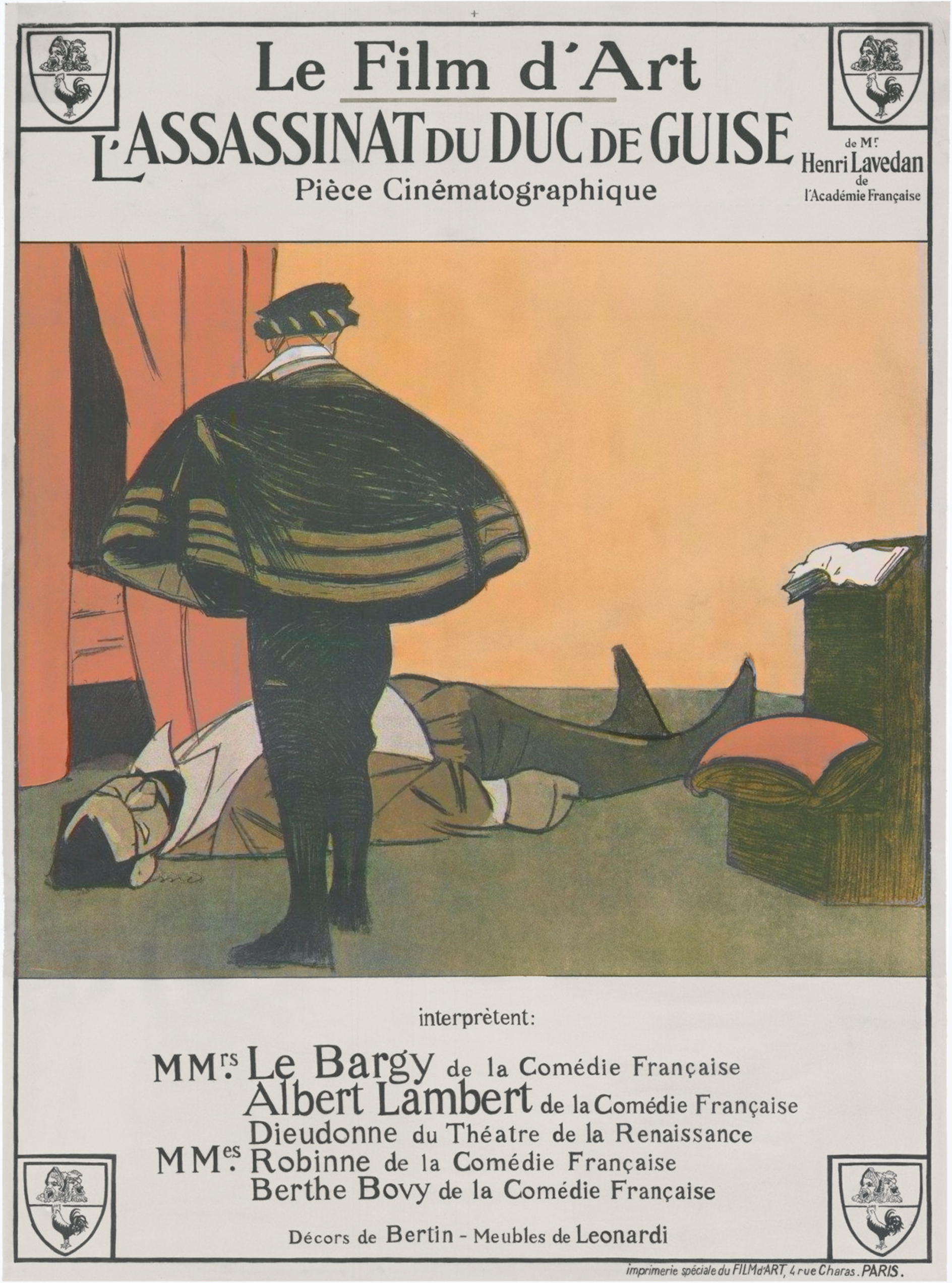
- Directed by: Charles le Bargy; André Calmettes
- Written by: Henri Lavedan
- Produced by: Frères Lafitte
- Starring: Charles le Bargy; Albert Lambert; Gabrielle Robinne; Berthe Bovy
- Cinematography: Èmile Pierre
- Music by: Camille Saint-Saëns
- Distributed by: Pathé Frères
- Release dates: 17 November 1908 (France); 17 February 1909 (US)
- Running time: approx. 17 minutes
- Country: France
- Language: French

The Assassination of the Duke of Guise

The Assassination of the Duke of Guise (1908) (original French title: La Mort du duc de Guise; often referred to as L'Assassinat du duc de Guise) is a French film d'art silent film directed by Charles le Bargy and André Calmettes, adapted by Henri Lavedan, and featuring actors of the Comédie-Française and prominent set designers. It is one of the first films to feature both an original film score, composed by Camille Saint-Saëns, and a screenplay by an eminent screenwriter.

== Synopsis ==
Lasting longer than was usual in its time, about 15 minutes, the film more or less accurately depicts the events of the day in 1588 when King Henry III (played by co-director le Bargy) summoned his powerful rival, Duke Henri de Guise, to his chambers at the Château de Blois and had him brutally murdered. The film has its share of lurid thrills and better acting than most films of the time. It is staged in a somewhat theatrical manner but has slow pacing throughout.

== Production ==
The Assassination was one of the first and most successful films to be made by Le Film d'Art, a production company founded in 1907 with the intention of making films that would earn the respect of the cultural elite as well as the patronage of large audiences. The script was written for the screen (by Henri Lavedan), but its costumes and staging followed the historical tradition of the French theater.

The movie contains the rudiments of the more elaborate narrative techniques of films to come. Although it consists of only nine shots, with theatrical rather than cinematic acting and staging, it presents enough elements of a story that it could be understood on its own. It does this through continuity of action and space. Leading up to and including the assassination, the camera follows the movements of the main character over five separate shots, through three separate rooms and back. Other elements were theatrical rather than filmic, such as sets with painted backdrops and the camera's single stationary position for each scene, reminiscent of a seat on the main floor, not far from the "stage."

Calmettes and le Bargy were both eminent actors, and le Bargy a member of the Comédie-Française.

== Cast ==
- Charles le Bargy as Henry III
- Albert Lambert as Le duc de Guise
- Gabrielle Robinne as Marquise de Noirmoutier, maîtresse du duc
- Berthe Bovy as Le page
- Jean Angelo
- Albert Dieudonné
- Huguette Duflos
- Raphaël Duflos
- Charles Lorrain
- Rolla Norman

== Score ==
The Fairylogue and Radio-Plays contains the earliest documented original score in all of cinema; The Assassination of the Duke of Guise debuted in the United States around four months later. Calmettes is credited with the idea of scoring the film, and Saint-Saëns was a logical choice for such a prestigious venture. At age 73, he was probably France's most celebrated composer, and he had extensive experience in theater music. The score integrates small-scale dramatic details within a large-scale musical form to a degree rarely equaled during the rest of the silent period. Information about how he approached the project is scarce and ambiguous. Bonnerot, his biographer, tells us that he worked out the music "scene by scene before the screen"; and that because of the approach of winter he left Paris before the film's première, leaving Fernand LeBorne to conduct the orchestra. Saint-Saëns had a piano reduction of the score, dedicated to LeBorne, published by Durand that year.

== Premiere ==
The première was held at the Salle Charras on 17 November 1908. It was high-toned throughout, befitting such an "art" film. Sponsored and advertised by Le Film d'Art under the title "Visions d'Art", the various entertainments mostly combined imagery and live music. There were two other features beside The Assassination, each with an original score of its own: Le Secret de Myrto, depicting ballerina Régina Badet dancing to music of Gaston Berardi; and L'Empreinte, with music by Fernand Le Borne contained a series of "picturesque tableaux" using silhouettes of Pierrot and other pantomime figures. The program included color photographs from Asia, described as "fairy-tale views" taken by Gervais-Courtellemont. Le Bargy also recited Edmond Rostand's poem "Le Bois sacré", which was said to be "illustrated by a ballet—or rather, a choreographic vision."

== Reception ==
The film's success in France inspired other companies to make similar films, thus inaugurating a genre which eventually became known as films d'art, taking the name of the leading production company; a genre characterized by elaborate theatricality in sets, costumes, and acting, and associated with historical dramas concerned with noble characters.

The Assassination of the Duke of Guise was released in the United States by Pathé Frères on February 17, 1909. There is no trace of a special premiere for the program. In Moving Picture World, Pathé simply announced the film as one of its current "dramatic" releases, at a length of 853 feet, considerably shorter than the version for which Saint-Saëns had composed his score; and the company dropped the film from its listings five weeks later. There is no record that the score was even heard in America at that time. Neither the film nor the score was suited to the nickelodeon-centered American film industry in 1909, but it was nevertheless reviewed extensively over the next several weeks.

It received considerable attention from critics because of the reputation of its creators and crew. Many critics noted that with the movie's basis in French history, the film might appeal to the upper class, but the average American moviegoer might not be able to follow the plot. When comparing the movie with contemporary American historical drama, many critics considered The Assassination to have better photography, better acting, and better dramatic construction.

== Sources ==
- Gunning, Tom, D.W. Griffith and the Origins of American Narrative Film, 1994, University of Illinois Press
- Hanson, Bernard, "D.W. Griffith: Some Sources," The Art Bulletin, Vol. 54, No. 4. (December 1972), pp. 493–515
- Marks, Martin Miller, Music and the Silent Film: Contexts and Case Studies, 1895–1924 , 1997, Oxford University Press
- Milestones of the Millennium: Great Film Music, 1999, NPR

== See also ==
- Counts and dukes of Guise
