= Une nuit agitée =

- Directed by: Max Linder
- Written by: Max Linder; Louis Feuillade
- Produced by: Pathé Frères
- Starring: Max Linder
- Distributed by: Pathé Frères
- Release date: May 25, 1912
- Running time: short
- Country: France
- Language: Silent..French intertitles

Une nuit agitée (English: An Agitated Night) is a 1912 short film directed by and starring Max Linder. The story was by Linder and fellow film colleague Louis Feuillade. The film was produced and distributed by the Pathé Frères company.

== Cast ==
- Max Linder
- Stacia Napierkowska
- Jane Renouardt
