= Dobrica Milutinović =

Serbian actor

Dobrivoje "Dobrica" Milutinović
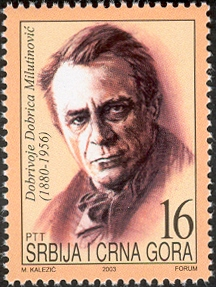
- Milutinović on 2003 Serbian stamp
- Born: 11 September 1880; Niš, Kingdom of Serbia
- Died: 18 November 1956 (aged 76); Belgrade, Yugoslavia
- Occupation: actor

Dobrivoje "Dobrica" Milutinović (11 September 1880 – 18 November 1956) was a Serbian actor. He acted in both film and theatre roles. A theatre is named in his honour, and the lifetime achievement award for actors in Serbia is based on a ring he received.

== Work ==
His family was originally from Srem. Milutinović enrolled in gymnasium in Kragujevac where he started acting as a student.

Milutinović played both heroic and romantic roles in the theater, which earned him respect and popularity. He starred in many roles, including Romeo, King Lear, Don Carlos, Othello, Uriel, Hajduk Veljko, Maksim Crnojević, Tsar Dušan, and Mitke in Koštana. He was a member of the National Theater in Belgrade from 1899 until his death.

In addition to theater, he starred in films. In the 1911 film The Life and Deeds of the Immortal Leader Karađorđe he played the role of Janko Katić. He also starred in Ulrih Celjski i Vladislav Hunjadi (1911) and he played the role of Grandfather Djed Vuk in the 1947 movie This People Will Live.

== Legacy ==
The theater in Sremska Mitrovica was named "Dobrica Milutinović" in 1974.

Historian Jovan Deretić dubbed him "the cult name of Serbian theatre".

On the occasion of the 40th anniversary of his work in 1937, Milutinović was awarded a ring. Since 1980, a copy of it is regularly awarded as a prestigious lifetime achievement to Serbian actors. The award is named after him - Dobrica's ring (Serbian: Dobričin prsten).
