= Milorad Petrović (actor) =

Serbian actor of stage and early cinema

Milorad Petrović (Serbian Cyrillic: Милорад Петровић; 1865 – 1928) was one of the most prominent Serbian stage performers of the late 19th and early 20th centuries. He played the role of Karađorđe in The Life and Deeds of the Immortal Leader Karađorđe, the first feature film produced in Serbia and the Balkans, which was released in 1911. He died in Skopje in 1928.
