= Ilija Stanojević =

Serbian actor

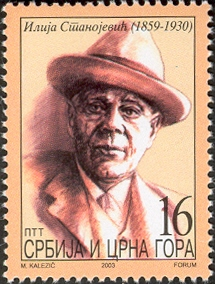
An image of Ilija Stanojević on a Serbian postage stamp

Ilija Stanojević (Serbian Cyrillic: Илија Станојевић; 7 August 1859 – 8 August 1930) was one of the most prominent Serbian actors of the early 20th century. In 1911, Stanojević co-founded the Union for the Production of Serbian Films (Serbian: Udruženje za snimanje srpskih filmova) with Svetozar Botorić. The same year, he directed and acted in The Life and Deeds of the Immortal Leader Karađorđe, the first Serbian feature film, which Botorić produced. Stanojević also helped write the film's screenplay. After making the film, Stanojević returned to the stage, and remained a theatrical performer for the remainder of his career.
