= Farewell, My Beautiful Naples (1917 film) =

- Directed by: Giuseppe de Liguoro
- Written by: Ernesto Murolo (play)
- Cinematography: Luigi Dell'Otti
- Production company: Fausta Film
- Distributed by: Fausta Film
- Release date: 1 August 1917
- Running time: 60 minutes
- Country: Italy
- Languages: Silent; Italian intertitles

Farewell, My Beautiful Naples (Italian: Addio, mia bella Napoli!) is a 1917 Italian silent romance film directed by Giuseppe de Liguoro. It is based on a 1910 play by Ernesto Murolo, which was later turned into a 1946 sound film of the same name.

== Plot ==
A Neapolitan man falls in love with the American tourist for whom he's acting as guide; however, he already has a fiancée.

== Reception ==
Writing for La Cine-fono, critic Filmino praised the adaptation of Murolo's play, saying it had been done with "skill, good taste, and, above all, conscientiousness", as well as the mise-en-scène of Naples itself from the film's evocative exteriors, interiors, and authentic costumes.

== Cast ==
- Francesco Amodio
- Signor Castelli
- Irene-Saffo Momo
- Flora Severati
- Camillo Talamo
- Signora Tournier

== Bibliography ==
- Goble, Alan. The Complete Index to Literary Sources in Film. Walter de Gruyter, 1999.
