= The Hunchback of Notre Dame (1911 film) =

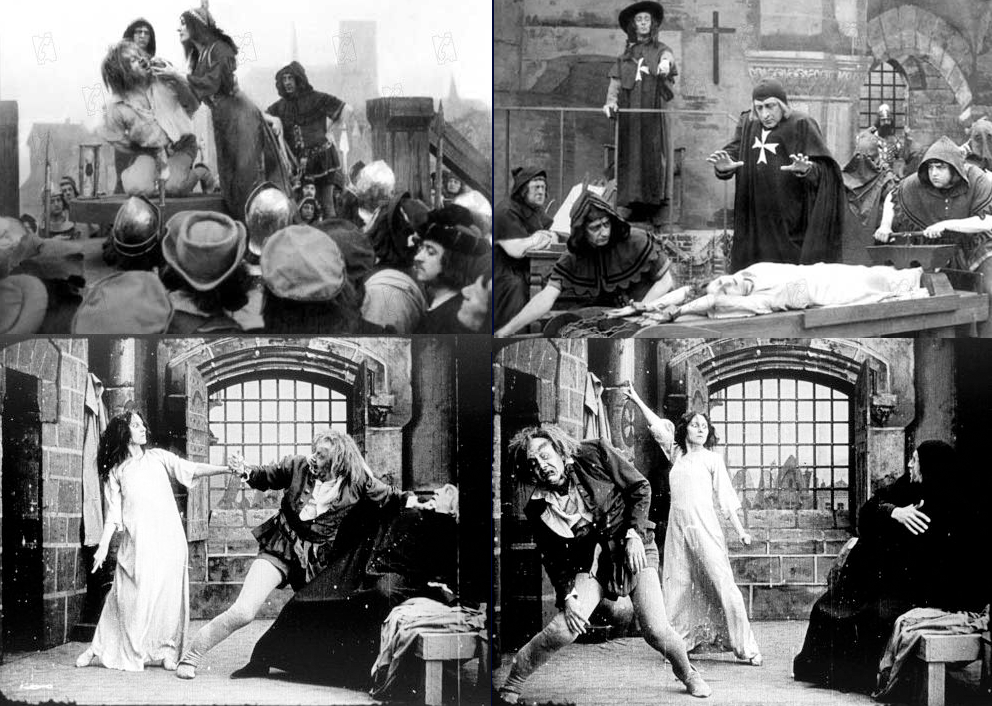
- Directed by: Albert Capellani
- Written by: Michel Carré
- Based on: The Hunchback of Notre-Dame; 1831 novel by Victor Hugo
- Produced by: Pathé Frères (as Compagnie Genérale des Établissements Pathé Frères Phonographes & Cinématographes [C.G.P.C.])
- Starring: Henry Krauss; Stacia Napierkowska; Claude Garry
- Cinematography: Pierre Trimbach
- Distributed by: Pathé Frères (France); General Film Company (USA)
- Release date: December 1911 (U.S.)
- Running time: 26 minutes
- Country: France
- Language: Silent film (English intertitles for USA distribution)

The Hunchback of Notre Dame was a 1911 French film d'art silent film directed by Albert Capellani and produced by Pathé Frères. It was released under the name Notre-Dame de Paris. It starred Henry Krauss and Stacia Napierkowska. The film was based on the 1831 Victor Hugo novel The Hunchback of Notre-Dame. Considering the film's brief running time, critic Christopher Workman considered it "remarkably faithful to its source material" but it "contains no discernible humor, unlike most other horror films of the period, and thus represents a bellwether of sorts for the genre....(Henry Krauss as Quasimodo) "looks remarkably like Charles Ogle in (Thomas) Edison's 1910 Frankenstein."

Although the film vilified organized Christianity by portraying members of the clergy as "sadistic and duplicitous", it was theatrically released in the US in December 1911, shortly before Christmas.

== Plot ==
Esmeralda, a gypsy (Hugo's term) girl, is the darling of the people around Notre Dame Cathedral in Paris. Three men are romantically interested in her: Phöebus, the commander of the city guard, Quasimodo the bell ringer of Notre Dame and Claudius Frollo, the archdeacon of the cathedral. The latter, however, is confused by his strong affection for Esmeralda and cannot resolve the conflict caused by his vow of celibacy. Out of jealousy, he stabs a knife in Phöebus's back when he meets with Esmeralda in an inn. Esmeralda is falsely accused and charged with this crime. The resultant death sentence is to be executed on the forecourt of the cathedral. Quasimodo rescues Esmeralda and brings her up into the bell tower to safety but Frollo violates the sanctuary and has Esmeralda executed by hanging. Quasimodo then angrily throws Frollo from the bell tower to his death.

== Cast ==
- Henry Krauss as Quasimodo
- Stacia Napierkowska as Esméralda
- René Alexandre as Phoebus de Châteaupers
- Claude Garry as Claude Frollo
- Jean Angelo
- Paul Capellani
- Jean Dax
- Mévisto
