= Mary Tudor (1911 film) =

- Directed by: Giuseppe de Liguoro
- Production company: Milano Film
- Distributed by: Milano Film
- Release date: 29 September 1911
- Country: Italy
- Language: Italian

Mary Tudor (Italian: Maria Tudor) is a 1911 Italian silent historical film directed by Giuseppe de Liguoro. A lost film, little is known about it other than its portrayal of Mary I of England. It was reportedly a lavish production, with three hundred costumes and usage of authentic furniture from the period portrayed. It might be based on the play Marie Tudor by Victor Hugo. De Liguoro directed a number of historical films during the era.
