= Farewell, My Beautiful Naples (1946 film) =

1946 film by Mario Bonnard

- Directed by: Mario Bonnard
- Written by: Ernesto Murolo (play); Mario Bonnard
- Starring: Fosco Giachetti; Vera Carmi; Clelia Matania
- Cinematography: Gábor Pogány
- Edited by: Gino Talamo
- Music by: Franco Casavola
- Production company: Idea Film
- Distributed by: Indipendenti Regionali
- Release date: 1946
- Running time: 91 minutes
- Country: Italy
- Language: Italian

Farewell, My Beautiful Naples (Italian: Addio, mia bella Napoli!) is a 1946 Italian musical melodrama film directed by Mario Bonnard and starring Fosco Giachetti, Vera Carmi and Clelia Matania. It is based on a 1910 play which had previously been made into a 1917 silent film of the same title. Location shooting took place around Naples, including at Pompeii, Amalfi and Capri.

== Synopsis ==
In Naples, a local composer falls in love with an American tourist. The two start a relationship, but the girl is forced to leave. Heartbroken, the young man dedicates a song to her.

== Cast ==
- Fosco Giachetti as Carlo Sanna, composer
- Vera Carmi as Roberta Sullivan
- Clelia Matania as Yvonne de Fleurette
- Paolo Stoppa as Ruocco
- Bella Starace Sainati
- Lidia Drutskoy
- Franco Pesce

== Bibliography ==
- Brunetta, Gian Piero. The History of Italian Cinema: A Guide to Italian Film from Its Origins to the Twenty-first Century. Princeton University Press, 2009.
