= Svetozar Botorić =

Svetozar Botorić (Serbian Cyrillic: Светозар Боторић; 1857–1916) was a Serbian entrepreneur and film producer. He was the owner of Serbia's first movie theatre, the Paris Cinema, located inside the eponymous Hotel Paris, at Belgrade's Terazije Square, which opened in December 1908. Unlike many of his contemporaries, Botorić was convinced that film could be turned into a profitable endeavour. In 1909, he signed a contract with the French cinematographic firm Pathé, becoming their representative in Serbia and Bulgaria. In this capacity, he held exclusive Balkan premieres of Pathé's films in his hotel. Botorić also regularly produced newsreels about local events on Pathé's behalf, with the firm providing filming equipment and a cameraman (Louis de Beéry), and Botorić giving them a share of his admission profits. In 1911, Botorić teamed up with the prominent stage actor Ilija Stanojević to establish the Union for the Production of Serbian Films (Serbian: Udruženje za snimanje srpskih filmova).

In 1911, Botorić produced The Life and Deeds of the Immortal Leader Karađorđe, often referred to simply as Karađorđe, Serbia's first feature film. The film was successful domestically, but failed to find a distributor abroad. The same fate befell Botorić's other productions. After several further unsuccessful attempts at getting international distribution for his films, Botorić left the film industry altogether. Commercial film production came to a virtual halt following the outbreak of World War I. During the Austro-Hungarian, German and Bulgarian invasion of Serbia in late 1915, Botorić was taken prisoner, and died in an Austro-Hungarian internment camp the following year. Karađorđe was considered lost for much of the 20th century, but a surviving print was found in Vienna in July 2003.

== Bibliography ==
- Bottomore, Stephen (2005). "The Balkans". In Abel, Richard (ed.). Encyclopedia of Early Cinema. London, England: Routledge. p. 58. ISBN 978-1-13456-675-4.
- Deliso, Christopher (2008). Culture and Customs of Serbia and Montenegro. Santa Barbara, California: ABC-CLIO. ISBN 978-0-31334-437-4.
- Gocić, Goran (2008). Introducing Youth: Self-Reflection on Serbian Cinema. Belgrade, Serbia: Film Center Serbia. ISBN 978-8-67227-059-4.
- Kosanović, Dejan; Tucaković, Dinko (1998). Stranci u raju (in Serbo-Croatian). Belgrade, Yugoslavia: Stubovi kulture. OCLC 40511813.
- Kosanović, Dejan (2000). Leksikon pionira filma i filmskih stvaralaca na tlu jugoslovenskih zemalja: 1896–1945 (in Serbian). Belgrade, Serbia: Yugoslav Film Archive. ISBN 978-8-67227-036-5.
- Kosanović, Dejan (2011). Kinematografija i film u Kraljevini SHS/Kraljevini Jugoslaviji 1918–1941 (in Serbian). Belgrade, Serbia: Film Center Serbia. ISBN 978-8-67227-068-6.
- Liehm, Mira; Liehm, Antonín J. (1980). The Most Important Art: Soviet and Eastern European Film After 1945. Los Angeles, California: University of California Press. ISBN 978-0-52004-128-8.
- Norris, David A. (2008). Belgrade: A Cultural History. Oxford, England: Oxford University Press. ISBN 978-0-19-970452-1.
- Sudar, Vlastimir (2013). A Portrait of the Artist as a Political Dissident: The Life and Work of Aleksandar Petrović. Chicago, Illinois: University of Chicago Press. ISBN 978-1-84150-545-9.
