= Baron Munchausen's Dream =

- Directed by: Georges Méliès
- Based on: Baron Munchausen
- Release date: 1911
- Running time: 10 minutes
- Country: France
- Languages: Silent film French intertitles

Baron Munchausen's Dream (French: Les Hallucinations du baron de Münchausen), also known as Les Aventures de baron de Munchausen and Monsieur le Baron a trop bien dîné, is a 1911 French short silent film in the fantasy film genre, directed by Georges Méliès.

== Synopsis ==
After an evening of entertaining guests with lavish food and drink, a drunk Baron Munchausen is carried to his bed, underneath a huge Rococo mirror. He soon drifts into heavy sleep, only to experience a variety of disturbing and otherworldly dreams. An idyllic scene of couples dancing in a park gives way to a violent tableau of Ancient Egyptian design; the Three Graces, standing in classical poses, become three frog-like monsters and then three halberdiers.

Awaking briefly, the Baron checks his reflection in a mirror to ensure all is well, then drifts back into dreams: his bed seems to dance about in an Orientalist landscape, and then it is attacked by giant grasshopper and a clown. Believing himself to be awake, the Baron approaches a fountain attended by women, who then make snow pour down upon him. They are replaced by a mythic figure who disappears down a well. The Baron next dreams himself in Hell, attacked by demons, a dragon, and a spider woman, and then outside a garrison where soldiers are shooting at him.

Finally back in his room, and again thinking he has woken up, the Baron finds himself attacked by a grinning Man in the Moon who transforms into a bespectacled elephant. Lifting a heavy piece of furniture, the Baron hurls it toward the dreams, breaking the mirror and sending him falling down into the outdoors, where he is hooked on an iron fence and has to be rescued. A final scene shows the Baron, much the worse for his experience, attended by servants.

== Production ==
Méliès greatly admired the Baron Munchausen stories created by Rudolf Erich Raspe, and may have used them as inspiration for his celebrated film A Trip to the Moon. However, Baron Munchausen's Dream has little in common with the Baron character or his traditional adventures.

The film was one of six commissioned from Méliès by the studio Pathé Frères; Méliès made the film in his Star Film Company studio, relying on Pathé to distribute it. The closely framed medium shot at the beginning of the film, an unusual setup for Méliès, probably indicates Pathé's influence. Similarly, the film's pace, extremely relaxed by Méliès's standards, may point to outside pressure to make the film run longer.

The scenery, painted in detail on two-dimensional backgrounds and cutouts, was created by a frequent Méliès collaborator, Charles Claudel. It was filmed in Méliès's glass studios, except for the outdoors scene near the end of the film, which was shot outside the Méliès house nearby. Many of the props are recycled from Méliès's earlier films, such as an elaborate dragon puppet from the 1906 fantasy The Witch. Effects in the film were created using stage machinery, pyrotechnics, substitution splices, and dissolves.

The mirror sequence in the film is based on a routine that had long been popular in music halls. The effect was not produced with a real mirror, which would have reflected the studio windows and the camera; instead, there were two actors on the set, one of whom mimicked the other's gestures from the opposite side of the imaginary "glass." The comedian Max Linder revived the mirror routine in his 1921 film Seven Years Bad Luck.

== Release ==
The film's original title is Les Hallucinations du baron de Münchausen; it is also known as Les Aventures de baron de Munchhausen, and is known in English as Baron Munchausen's Dream. Though the film was commissioned by Pathé Frères, it is unclear whether the studio ever actually released it.

The film was shown in a cinema, possibly for the first time, in 1943; the exhibitor was André Robert, who obtained permission for the screenings from Méliès's widow, Jehanne d'Alcy. Because Münchhausen, a German film about the Baron, was then playing in Paris theaters, Robert changed the title of the Méliès film to Monsieur le Baron a trop bien dîné. An original orchestral score for the film was written and recorded by Marius-François Gaillard. Robert donated his print of the film to the Méliès family.
