= Pasquali Film =

Italian film production and distribution company

Pasquali Film was an Italian film production company of the silent era. Founded in 1909 in Turin by Ernesto Maria Pasquali, it was later merged into the Unione Cinematografica Italiana in 1919, before closing completely in 1924. It enjoyed its greatest period of success before the First World War. In 1910, it hired the French comedian Ferdinand Guillaume who starred in a series of short comedies.

== Bibliography ==
- Stam, Robert; Raengo, Alessandra (2008). A Companion to Literature and Film. New York: John Wiley & Sons. ISBN 978-0470999110.
