= L'Odissea (1911 film) =

- Directed by: Francesco Bertolini, Adolfo Padovan and Giuseppe De Liguoro
- Based on: Odyssey by Homer
- Starring: Giuseppe de Liguoro; Eugenia Tettoni; Ubaldo Maria Del Colle\
- Cinematography: Emilio Roncarolo
- Production company: Milano Films
- Distributed by: Helios
- Release date: November 1911
- Running time: 44 minutes
- Country: Italy
- Language: Silent film
- Budget: $200,000

L'Odissea is a 1911 Italian silent film, the third known adaptation from Homer's Odyssey. The film was made in the context of the World's Fair held in Turin in 1911 to celebrate the 50th anniversary of the Unification of Italy, where a film competition was launched for artistic, scientific and educational movies.

Released in 1912 in the United States it was welcomed, in the trade journal The Moving Picture World, the film was proclaimed as marking "a new epoch in the history of the motion picture as a factory of education".

== Plot ==
The film follows the journey of Odysseus as he attempts to return home to Ithaca after the Trojan War. After setting sail with his men, Odysseus encounters a series of mythical and perilous obstacles. They first face the Cyclops Polyphemus, whom Odysseus blinds in order to escape captivity. Continuing his journey, he navigates past the deadly Sirens and the monsters Scylla and Charybdis. After losing all his men and enduring years of hardship, Odysseus finally returns to Ithaca in disguise. There, he defeats the suitors who have overrun his home and is reunited with his faithful wife, Penelope, and his son, Telemachus.

== Reception ==
London City Nights said the film "was an interesting watch: the 1911 equivalent of a summer blockbuster, and a chance to see the past come alive in two ways; firstly in the depiction of Ancient Greece and secondly in the film itself as historical text."
