= Régina Badet =

French comedic actress, and dancer (1876–1949)

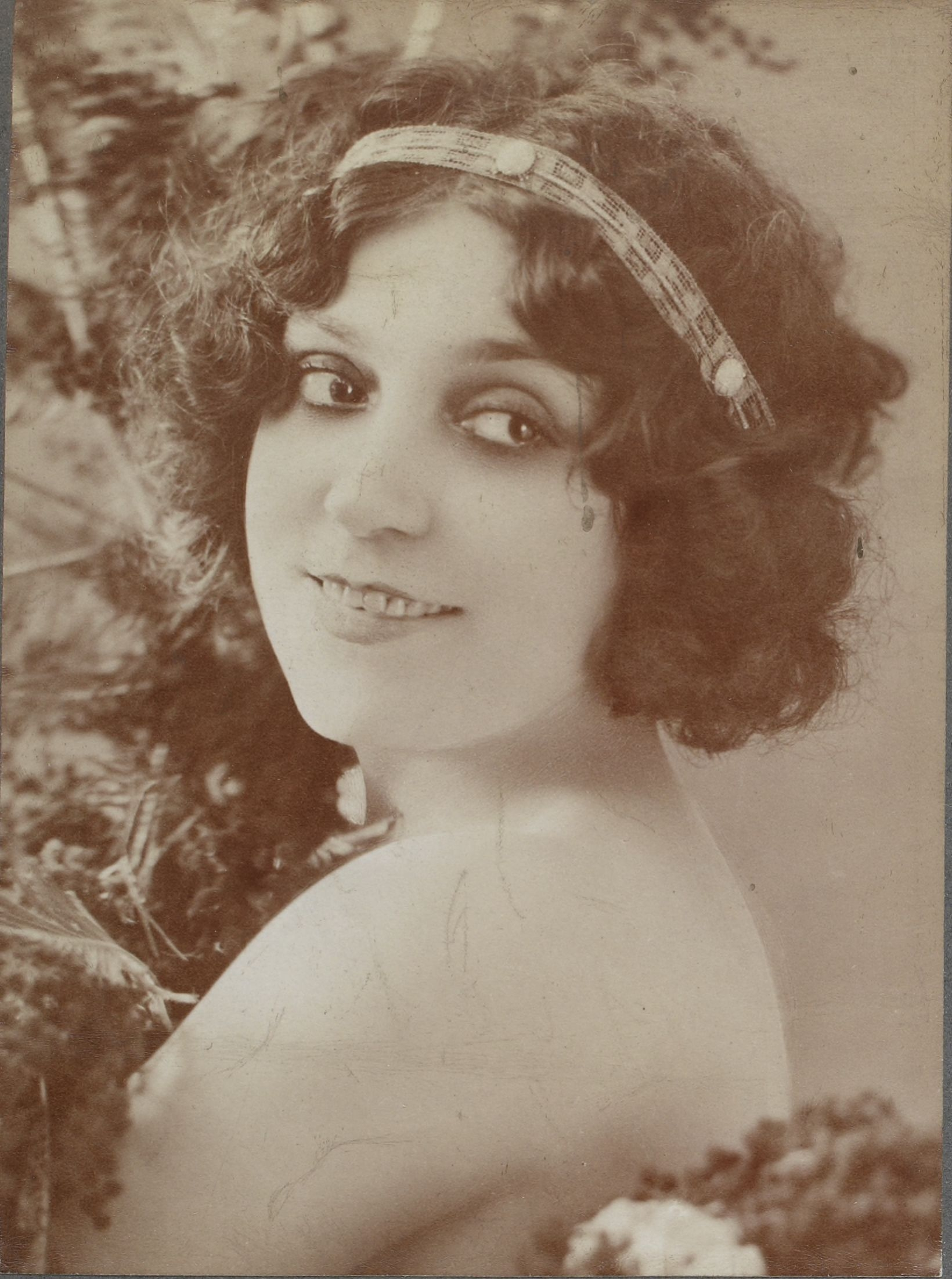
- Régina Badet by Jean Reutlinger
- Born: Anne Régina Badet; 9 October 1876; Bordeaux, French Third Republic
- Died: 26 October 1949 (aged 73); Bordeaux, France
- Occupation(s): Actress, Dancer
- Spouse: François Merman (m. 1946)

Anne Régina Badet (9 October 1876 – 26 October 1949) was a French comedic actress, dancer, and star of the Ópera-Comique de Paris.

== Career ==
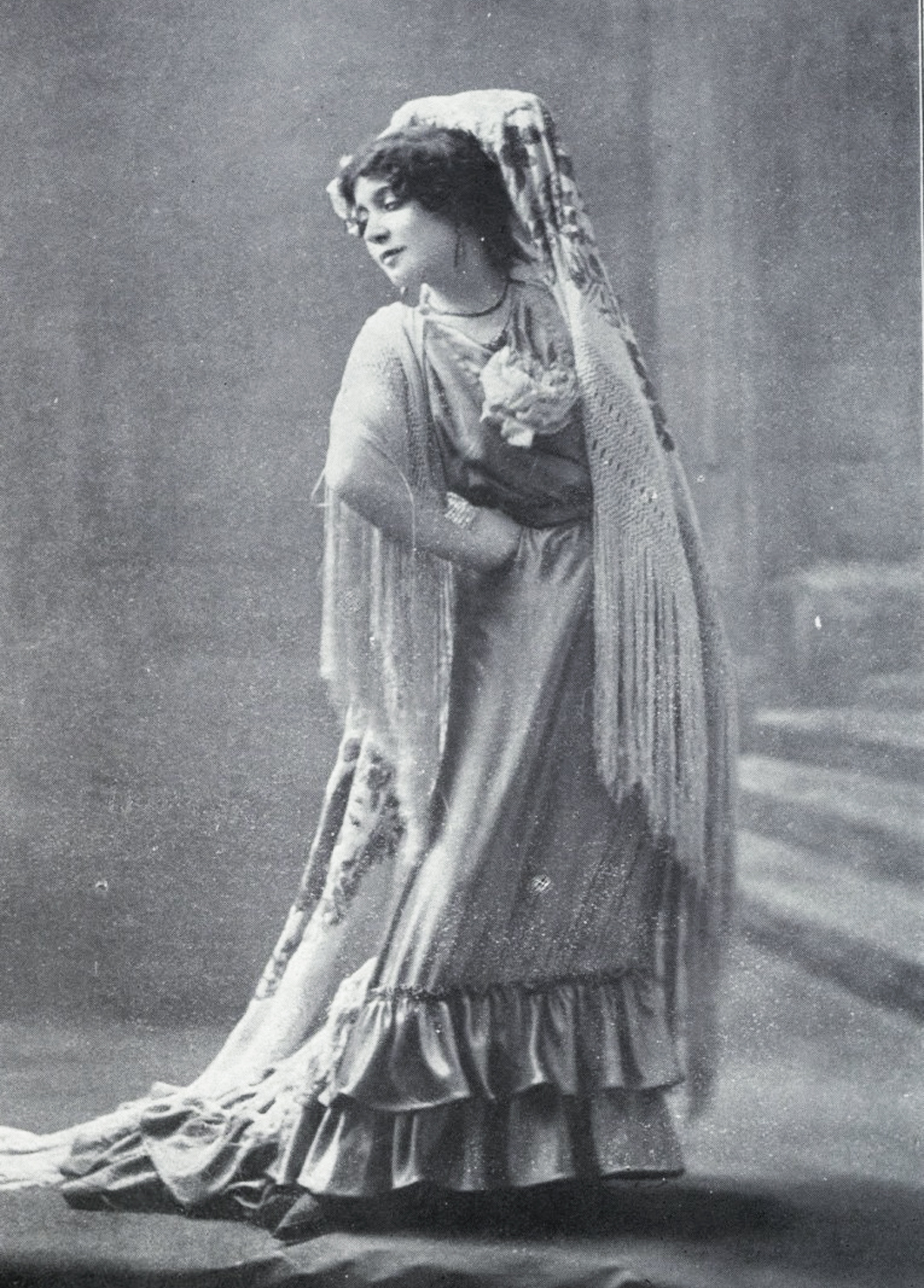
Régina Badet in 1910.

Badet was first dancer with the Grand Théâtre de Bordeaux in 1890. She began with the Opéra-Comique de Paris in 1904, dancing in productions of Lakmé (1905), Aphrodite (1906, in which she shared billing with dancer Mata Hari), Ariane et Barbe-Bleue (1907), Carmen (1908), Bacchus triomphant (1909), Le Mariage de Télémaque (1909), Athanaïs (1910), Sapphô (1912), La Grande Famille (1914), Un Mari dans du Coton (1916), Les Trois Sultanes (1917), Appassionata (1920), and Le Venin (1923). She was known for creating the role of Conchita Perez in a stage adaptation of La Femme et le Pantin (1910), in which her very minimal costume was a matter of some scandal.

Badet appeared in French silent films Le Secret de Myrto (1908), Le Retour d'Ulysse (1909), Carmen (1910), La Saltarella (1912), Zoé a le cœur trop tendre (A Woman's Last Card, 1912), Le Spectre du passé (1913), Vendetta (1914), Manuella (1916), Le Lotus d'or (The Golden Lotus, 1916), Sadounah (No Greater Love 1919), and Maître Évora (1922).

Her dances were often in the popular exotic style, referencing ancient or "oriental" themes. "Mlle. Badet does not seem to content herself with the lavish display of her charmingly pretty figure," commented an American writer, "but to run the gamut from the somewhat acrobatic and to our eyes grotesque posturing and 'stunts' which found so much favor with the ancients, to dances of ideas and emotions of a much higher and more poetic order, mingled with passages of adoration of and oblation to the goddess whom she serves." An American publication described her as "A Dancing Bernhardt," quoting her as saying "Every woman can live artistically," and "Nature never intended that a single woman should be plain or unattractive."

Badet was considered a great beauty of the Paris stage. A rose variety was named "Regina Badet" in 1909. During World War I she was active in the Union des Arts, theatrical professionals in Paris raising funds for war relief.

== Personal life ==
The Château Marbuzet in Bordeaux was reportedly built for Badet at great expense. It still stands as part of a vineyard. Pianist Arthur Rubinstein described a shipboard affair with Badet, on their way to Argentina in 1917. Badet died in 1949, aged 73 years, in Bordeaux. She was survived by her husband of three years, François Merman.

In 2016, Régina Badet was played by actress Hélèna Soubeyrand in a French film, Chocolat, about the Paris stage of the late nineteenth century.
