= Giuseppe de Liguoro =

Italian actor and film director

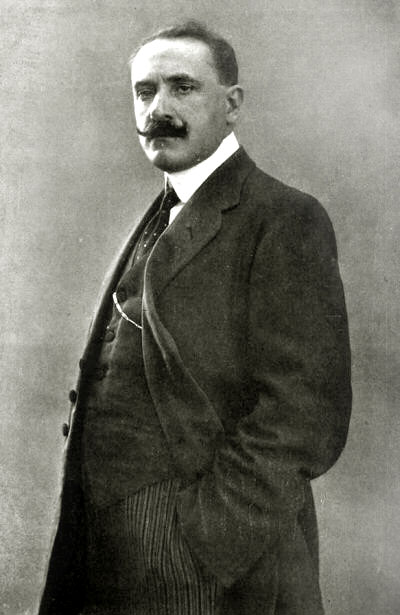
- De Liguoro in 1913
- Born: 10 January 1869; Naples, Kingdom of Italy
- Died: 19 March 1944 (aged 75); Rome, Kingdom of Italy
- Other name: Giuseppe Dei Conti de Liguoro Presicce
- Occupations: Director; Actor
- Years active: 1908–1929
- Notable work: L'Odissea; L'Inferno

Giuseppe de Liguoro (10 January 1869 – 19 March 1944) was an Italian actor and film director of the silent era. He came from an aristocratic Neapolitan family. De Liguoro was a pioneering figure of early Italian cinema, making a number of historical films in the early 1910s such as L'Inferno (1911) and Mary Tudor (1911). His son was the director Eugenio de Liguoro, who also occasionally acted in his father's films. His other son, Wladimiro de Liguoro, was also a filmmaker.

== Biography ==
Giuseppe de Liguoro was born in Naples on 10 January 1869 into an ancient Neapolitan aristocratic family. He began his career as a stage actor, making his debut in 1894 at the Teatro Alfieri, Florence as Horatio in Shakespeare's Hamlet.

He was initially a member of a theatre company led by Libero Pilotto and Ermete Zacconi, before forming his own company in the early 1900s. In 1908, he left theatre to pursue a career in film, taking up a position as artistic director at the Italian film production company SAFFI-Comerio, which was later renamed Milano Films.

De Liguoro's early films were mainly adaptations of literary and theatrical works, including the short movies Marin Faliero, doge di Venezia (1909), Edipo re (1910) and L'Odissea (1911). Of particular note was the historical movie Gioacchino Murat - Dalla locanda al trono. Based on the life of the King of Naples Joachim Murat, this film was shot in a castle owned by a Milanese nobleman and featured impressive sets and up to 400 extras.

The following year, de Liguoro released L'Inferno, one of the earliest cinematic adaptations of Dante's Divine Comedy. L'Inferno took over three years to make, and was the first full-length Italian feature film. It is also one of the first films to be shown in its entirety in the United States. In 1913, de Liguoro directed the feature-length film Giuseppe Verdi nella vita e nella gloria (Giuseppe Verdi in Life and Glory), a biopic about the life of the famous composer.

In 1914, he moved to Catania to work for the production company Etna Film. While in Sicily, he directed several popular films, including Christus (1914), Il cavaliere senza paura (1915) and Patria mia! (1915).

In 1915, he signed a contract with the Roman film production company, Caesar Film. For Caesar de Liguoro directed several films starring the diva Francesca Bertini, most notably Odette, released in 1916. From 1917 to 1923, he worked for various studios, including Gladiator Film and Unione Cinematografica Italiana. In 1924, he established his own film production company, Ultra-Visione, in Venice. Ultra-Visione only produced one film: Il leone di Omar, de Liguoro's final directorial project.

== Selected filmography ==
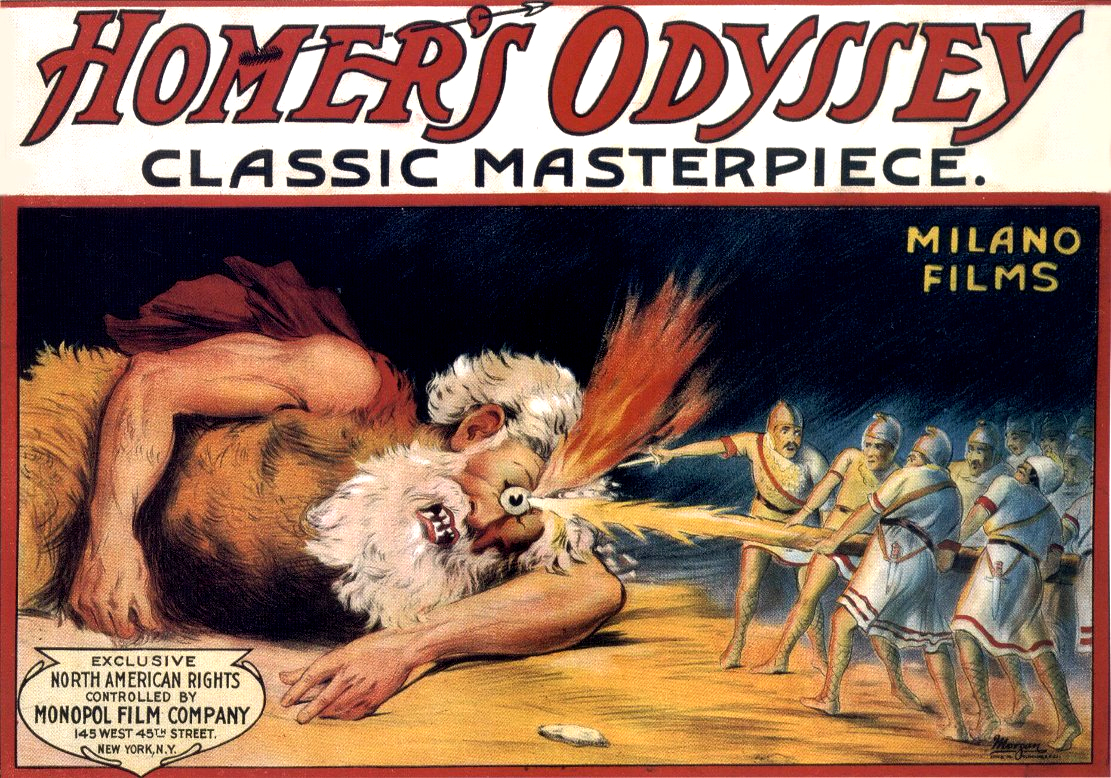
Poster to the U.S. theatrical release of L'Odissea

- Mary Tudor (1911)
- L'Inferno (1911)
- L'Odissea (Homer's Odyssey, 1911)
- Christus (1914)
- Il cavaliere senza paura (1915)
- Patria mia! (1915)
- Odette (1916)
- Farewell, My Beautiful Naples (1917)
- Iris (1918)
- Il leone di Omar (1924)

== Bibliography ==
- Parrill, Sue; Robison, William B. (2013). The Tudors on Film and Television. Jefferson, NC: McFarland. ISBN 978-0786458912.
