= Charles le Bargy =

French actor and director (1858–1936)

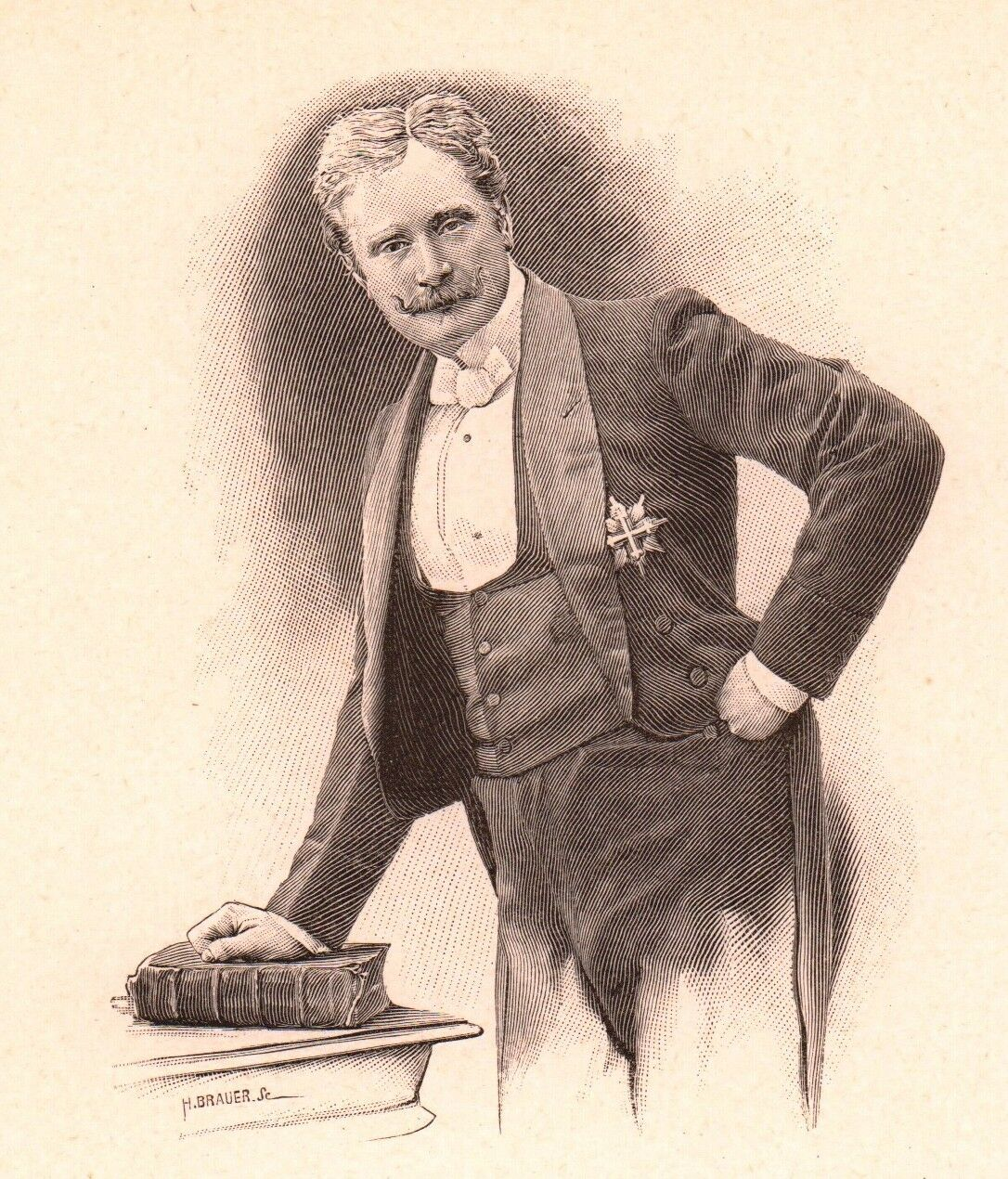
Charles le Bargy.

Charles Gustave Auguste le Bargy (28 August 1858 – 5 February 1936) was a French actor and early film director.

He was born at La Chapelle (Seine). His talent both as a comedian and a serious actor was soon made evident, and he became a member of the Comédie-Française, his chief successes being in such plays as Le Duel, L'Enigme, Le Marquis de Priola, L'Autre Danger, and Le Dedale. His wife, Simone Le Bargy (née Benda), an accomplished actress, made her debut at the Gymnase in 1902, and in later years had a great success in La Rafale and of her plays. In 1910 he had differences with the authorities of the Comédie-Française and ceased to be a societaire.

He acted in and directed several early French films, starting with L'Assassinat du duc de Guise (1908) and La Tosca (1909).

== Selected filmography ==
- The Call of the Blood (1920)
- Madame Récamier (1928)
- The Dream (1931)
