= Stacia Napierkowska =

French actress and dancer

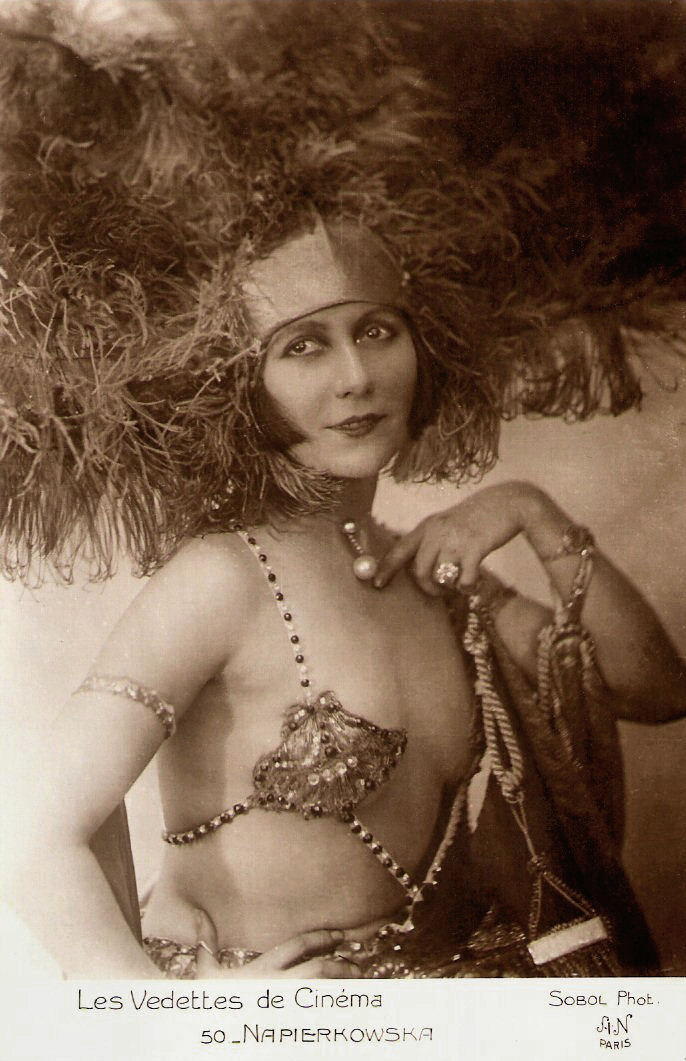
- Born: Renée Claire Angèle Élisabeth Napierkowski; 16 September 1891; Paris, French Third Republic
- Died: 11 May 1945 (aged 53); Paris, France
- Years active: 1908–1926

Stacia Napierkowska (born Renée Claire Angèle Élisabeth Napierkowski, 16 September 1891 – 11 May 1945) was a French actress, dancer, and director who worked during the silent film era. She appeared in 86 films between 1908 and 1926.

== Biography ==
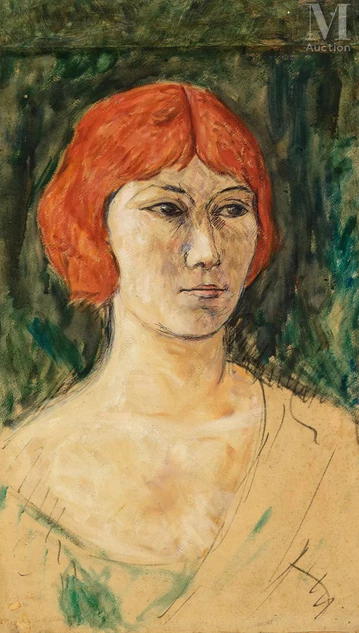
Portrait of the dancer Stacia Napierkowska

She was born Renée Claire Angèle Élisabeth Napierkowski in Paris to a Polish father, Stanisław Artur Napierkowski, and a French mother.

Napierkowska began her career with the Folies Bergère, where she was noticed by the director of the Opéra-Comique who engaged her to perform in the Fêtes Romaines organized at the Théâtre d’Orange. She then acted in early silent films, becoming a star while playing opposite the celebrated Max Linder.

In January 1913, she embarked for the United States to launch an international career: While sailing on the ocean liner Lorraine, she encountered the painter, Francis Picabia, who went on to produce a series of paintings inspired by her. In New York City, she was arrested during a dance performance when it was declared indecent. After returning to France, Napierkowska said, "Really, I have not brought away a single pleasant memory from the United States" and "What a narrow-minded people they are – how utterly impervious to any beautiful impression!"

She appeared as the ballerina Marfa Koutiloff, dancing dressed as a vampire bat, in an episode of the film serial Les Vampires (1915), directed by Louis Feuillade.

Konstantinos Dimitriadis made a sculpture of her in 1918, and she was painted by Simon Mondzain (Szymon Mondszajn) in 1920.

As a film actress, she specialized in exotic, seductive roles, including the Salome character as envisioned by Oscar Wilde.

In 1917, Napierkowska directed the short film L'Héritière de la manade.

She died in Paris on 11 May 1945.

== Selected filmography ==
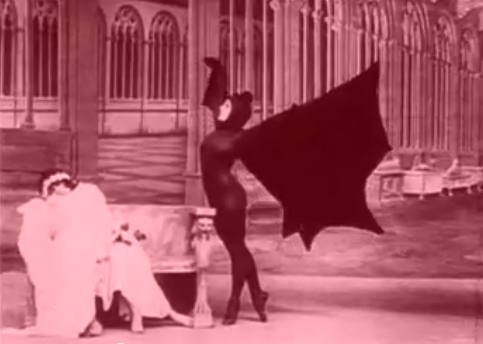
Napierkowska dancing as a vampire bat in Les Vampires (1915).

- Salomé (1908), in the title role (French, directed by Albert Capellani)
- Notre-Dame de Paris (1911), playing Esmeralda
- Une nuit agitée (1912), costarring Max Linder
- Les Vampires (1915), playing Marfa Koutiloff
- La figlia di Erodiade (The Daughter of Herodias) 1916, playing Salome
- L'Atlantide (1921), playing Reina Antinea [credited as Stacia Napierkorska]
- Le Berceau de Dieu (Cradle of God) (1926), playing Salome
