= André Calmettes =

French actor and film director

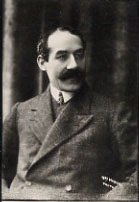
- Born: 18 August 1861; Paris, France
- Died: 14 March 1942 (aged 80); Paris, France

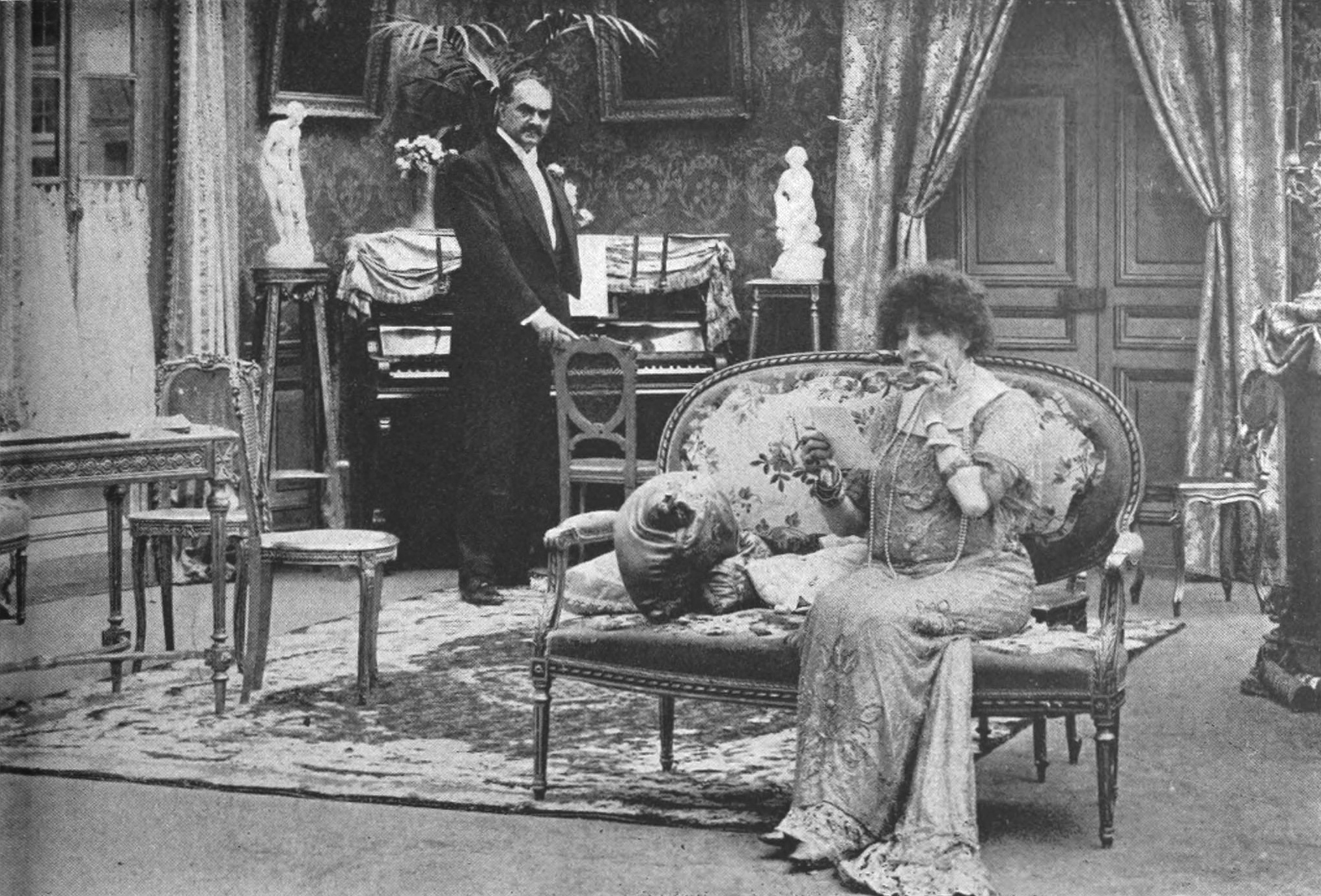
Scene from The Lady of the Camellias, with Sarah Bernhardt

André Calmettes (1861–1942) was a French actor and film director.

== Biography ==
After being a theatre actor for twenty years, he joined the society Le Film d'Art, founded in 1908 by the novelist and editor, Paul Lafitte at the urging of the Sociétaires of the Comédie-Française.

That same year, disturbed by the noise of the spectators, he suggested that films should have musical accompaniment. One of the first composers to produce music especially designed for a film was Camille Saint-Saëns, who arranged a piano score for Calmette's The Assassination of the Duke of Guise. Originally the music was played in the theatre, but Calmette later found a way to put musicians behind the screen and synchronize their playing with the film.

In the three years from 1909 to 1912, he gave a more theatrical touch to his work by casting famous stage actors such as Sarah Bernhardt, Réjane and Mounet-Sully to do adaptations of classic literary works, both French and English.

After 1913, he returned to the stage himself. He appeared in one film, Le Petit Chose, by André Hugon.

== Partial filmography ==
- The Assassination of the Duke of Guise (1908)
- La Tosca (1908)
- Macbeth (1909)
- Madame Sans-Gêne (1911) (Sources disagree as to whether the director was Calmettes, Henri Desfontaines or both.)
- The Lady of the Camellias (1911)
- Richard III (1912)
- The Little Thing (1923)
