= Pompeia =

Pompeia (/pɒmˈpiːə, -ˈpeɪə/) was the name of several ancient Roman women of the gens Pompeia:

- Pompeia, the daughter of Quintus Pompeius consul 141 BC, who married a certain Gaius Sicinius
- Pompeia (sister of Pompeius Strabo), sister of General and Consul Gnaeus Pompeius Strabo, who was the father to Pompey
- Pompeia (sister of triumvir Pompey), sister of Pompey and daughter of General and Consul Gnaeus Pompeius Strabo
- Pompeia, the wife of Publius Vatinius, a tribune in 59 BC
- Pompeia (wife of Julius Caesar), the second wife of Julius Caesar
- Pompeia (daughter of Pompey the Great) by his third wife, Mucia Tertia
- Pompeia (daughter of Sextus Pompeius), daughter of political rebel Sextus Pompeius and Scribonia
- Pompeia Macrina, a woman exiled by the Roman Emperor Tiberius in 33 AD
- Pompeia Paulina, wife of Seneca the Younger
- Pompeia Plotina, the wife of Roman Emperor Trajan
- Pompeia Macrina, one of the mothers-in-law of Roman historian and Senator Pliny the Younger

Other ancient and medieval women called Pompeia include:

- Pompeia Helena (1st century CE), a goldsmith
- Pompeia of Langoat, a Breton saint and queen

== See also ==
- Pompeius
- Pompeius (disambiguation)
- Pompeii (disambiguation)
- Pompey (disambiguation)
