= Pompeii (disambiguation) =

Pompeii is a ruined Roman city near modern Naples in the Italian region of Campania.

Pompeii, Pompei may also refer to:

== Places ==
- Pompei, a modern Italian city near the ruins of the Roman city
- Pompeii, Michigan, an unincorporated community in Gratiot County, Michigan, U.S.

== People ==
Angèle Pompéi (1898–1990), French Corsican scientist who worked at the Curie laboratory from 1929

Roberto Pompei (born 1970), Argentine footballer

== Arts, entertainment, and media ==
=== Films ===
- Pink Floyd: Live at Pompeii, a 1972 concert documentary film by Pink Floyd
- Pompeii: The Last Day, a 2003 UK television docudrama
- Apocalypse Pompeii, a 2014 action-adventure-disaster film by Ben Demaree
- Pompeii (film), a 2014 action-adventure-romance-disaster film by Paul W. S. Anderson
- Live at Pompeii, a 2017 live album and film by David Gilmour
- Pompei (2019 film), a 2019 French language film

=== Music ===
==== Groups and labels ====
- Pompeii (band), an American indie rock band

==== Albums ====
- Pompeii (Cate Le Bon album), 2022
- Pompeii (Triumvirat album), 1977
- Pompeii (EP), a 2007 EP by Beirut

==== Songs ====
- "Pompeii" (song), a 2013 song by British band Bastille
- "Pompeii", a 2001 song by E.S. Posthumus from Unearthed
- "Pompeii", a 2000 song by Sleater-Kinney from All Hands on the Bad One

=== Other uses in arts, entertainment, and media ===
- Pompeii (novel), a 2003 novel by Robert Harris, or the cancelled film adaptation
- Pompei: The Legend of Vesuvius, a 2000 historical adventure video game

== Other uses ==
- SS Pompeji, a Second World War German merchant ship
- Pompeii, a version of the Ancient Roman Gladius sword

== See also ==
- Pompeii in popular culture
- Pompee (disambiguation)
- Pompeia (disambiguation)
- Pompeianus (disambiguation)
- Pompeius (disambiguation)
- Pompey (disambiguation)
- Pompeya (disambiguation)
