= Pug =

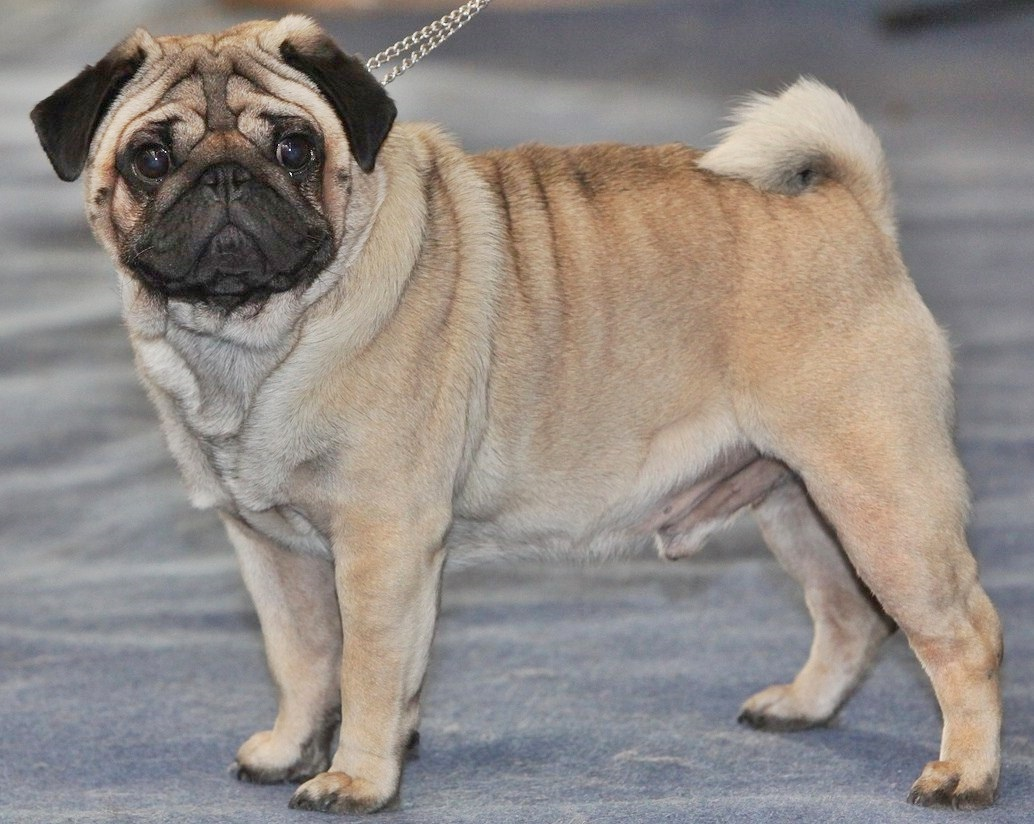
- A fawn-colored Pug, the most common coloring.
- Origin: China
Traits
- Weight: 14-18 lb (6.35-8.16 kg) in males and females.
- Coat: Fine, smooth, soft, short and glossy, neither hard nor woolly.
- Color: Silver, apricot, fawn or black only.
Kennel club standards
- China Kennel Union: standard
- Fédération Cynologique Internationale: standard

The Pug is a breed of dog with the physically distinctive features of a wrinkly, short-muzzled face, and curled tail. Pugs have a coat that is fine, smooth, soft, short, and glossy, coming in a variety of colors, most often fawn (light brown) or black, and a compact, square body with well developed and thick muscles all over the body.

Pugs were brought from China to Europe in the sixteenth century and were popularized in Western Europe by the House of Orange of the Netherlands, and the House of Stuart. In the United Kingdom, in the nineteenth century, Queen Victoria developed a passion for Pugs which she passed on to other members of the royal family.

Pugs are known for being sociable and gentle companion dogs. The American Kennel Club describes the breed's personality as "even-tempered and charming". Pugs remain popular into the twenty-first century, with some famous celebrity owners. The dogs are susceptible to various health problems due to their bred traits.

== Etymology ==
There are several theories as to the origin of the name "Pug". Some sources state the breed was named after the marmoset monkey, a popular exotic pet during the 18th century, which was also known as the "Pug-monkey". The Pug probably acquired its moniker on account of its flat face loosely resembling that of a primate.

Another popular belief is that it's derived from the Latin "pugnus" meaning "fist". Early Pugs were commonly cropped and supposedly that alteration resulted in a head that looked like the shadow of a closed fist when viewed from the side.

The Oxford English Dictionary has the word "Pug" as in the dog breed being descended from the meaning of "A dwarf animal, an imp, etc.". Since the late 16th century the term "pug" has been used in English to describe squirrels, hares, foxes, ferret, salmon, sheep, and monkeys. The first attestation of "Pug-dog" is in 1749. The OED also notes it may be related to a now obsolete term of endearment for a person or animal.

== Description ==
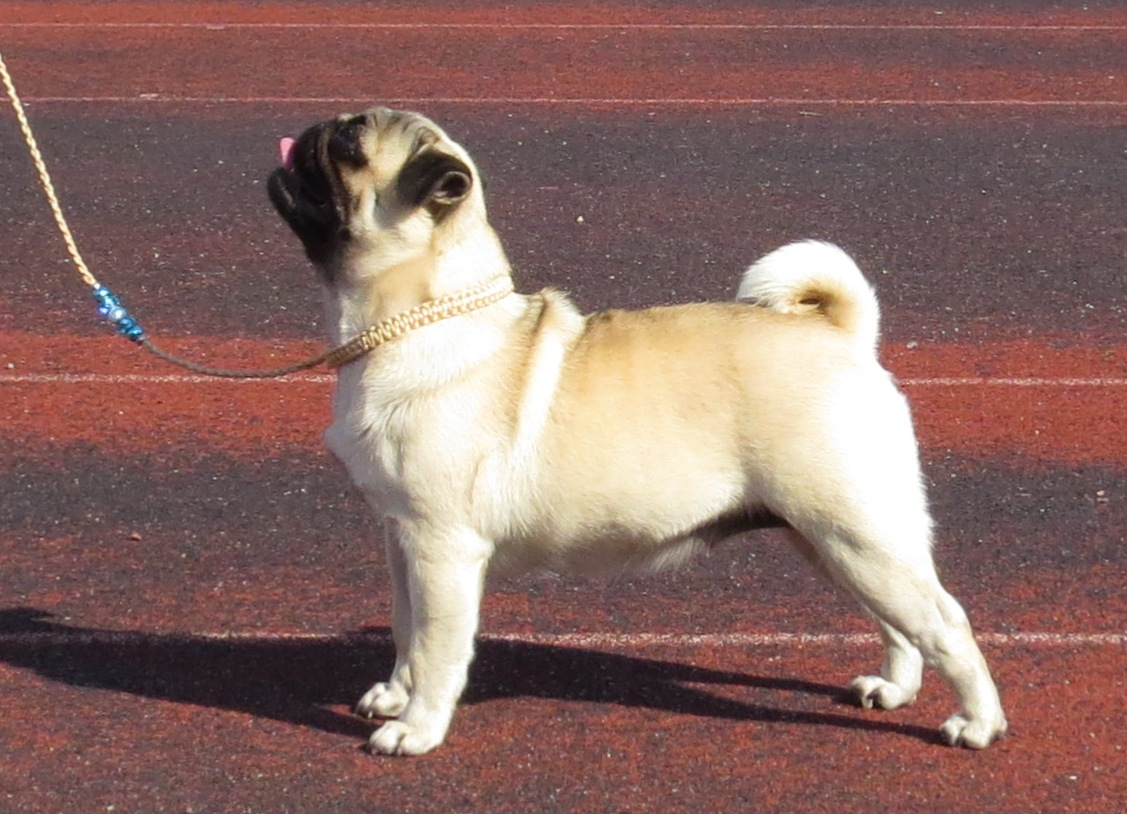
A fawn Pug puppy

=== Physical characteristics ===
While the Pugs that are depicted in eighteenth century prints tend to be long and lean, modern breed preferences are for a square cobby body, a compact form, a deep chest, and well-developed muscle. Their smooth and glossy coats can be fawn, apricot fawn, silver fawn, or black. The markings are clearly defined and there is a trace of a black line extending from the occiput to the tail. The tail normally curls tightly over the hip.

The Pug's muzzle is blunt and very short, giving a square shaped appearance to the head.

Pugs have two distinct ear shapes, "rose" and "button". "Rose" ears are smaller than the standard style of "button" ears, and are folded with the front edge against the side of the head. Breeding preference goes to "button" style ears.

Pugs' legs are strong, straight, of moderate length, and are set well under. Their shoulders are moderately laid back. Their ankles are strong, their feet are small, their toes are well split-up, and their claws are black. The lower teeth normally protrude further than their upper, resulting in an under-bite.

=== Temperament ===
The American Kennel Club says the motto of the breed is the Latin phrase multum in parvo, or "much in little" or "a lot of dog in a small space". Pugs tend to be intuitive and sensitive to the moods of their owners and are usually eager to please them. Pugs are playful and thrive on human companionship. Pugs are often called "shadows" because they follow their owners around and like to stay close to the action, craving attention and affection from their owners. Unlike many dog breeds that were developed for hunting, herding, or guarding, Pugs were bred primarily as companion animals, a role they have retained for centuries.

== History ==
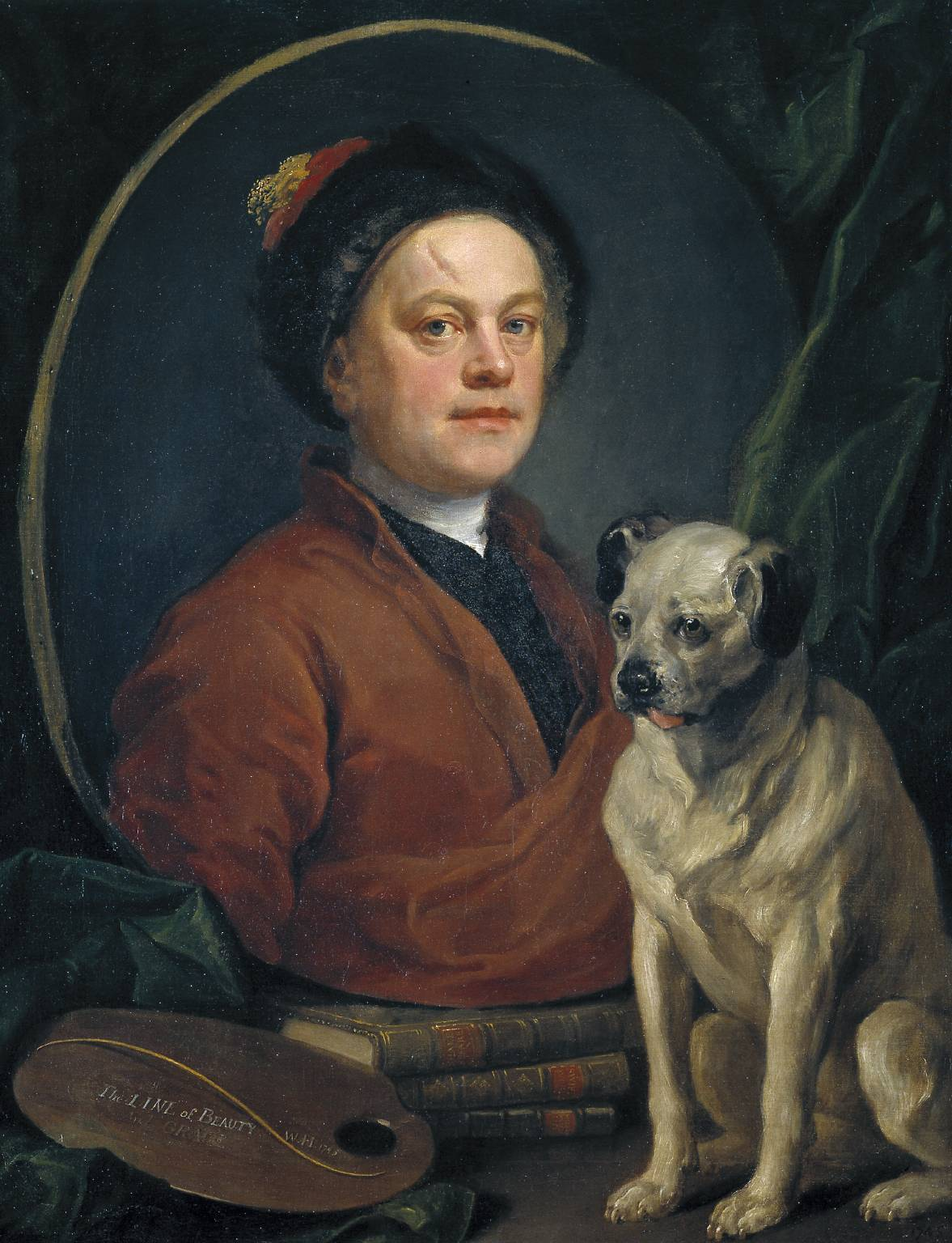
William Hogarth with his Pug, Trump, in 1745

=== Chinese origins ===
The ancestor of the Pug was a dog called the Lo-Chiang-Sze, or Lo-Sze in its shortened form. That name explicitly refers to a short-legged, short-mouthed and, most importantly, short-coated dog, potentially as a way to distinguish it from the Pekingese, which was of similar build. Many people today refer to it as the "ancient pug".

The Lo-sze was popular in the imperial court during the Song dynasty and was brought from China to Europe in the sixteenth century by the Dutch East India Company. The Happa or Hap-pah dog has also been considered as playing a part in the formation of the modern Pug breed, but it was not acquired by European fanciers until 1860 when specimens were looted by British and French troops during their burning of the Old Summer Palace in Beijing during the Second Opium War.

In ancient times, Pugs were bred to be companions for ruling families in China. Pet Pugs were highly valued by Chinese emperors, and the royal dogs were kept in luxury and guarded by soldiers. Pugs later spread to other parts of Asia. In Tibet, Buddhist monks kept Pugs as pets in their monasteries. The breed has retained its affectionate devotion to its owners since ancient times.

=== 16th and 17th centuries ===
Pugs became popular at European courts and reportedly became the official dog of the House of Orange in 1572, after a Pug named Pompey saved the life of the Prince of Orange by alerting him to the approach of assassins.

A Pug traveled with William III and Mary II when they left the Netherlands to accept the throne of England in 1688. During that period, the Pug may have been bred with the old-type King Charles Spaniel, giving the modern King Charles Spaniel its Pug-like characteristics.

The breed eventually became popular in other European countries as well. Pugs were painted by Goya in Spain, and in Italy they rode up front on private carriages, dressed in jackets and pantaloons that matched those of the coachman. They were used by the military to track animals and people, and were also employed as guard dogs.

=== 18th century to 20th century ===
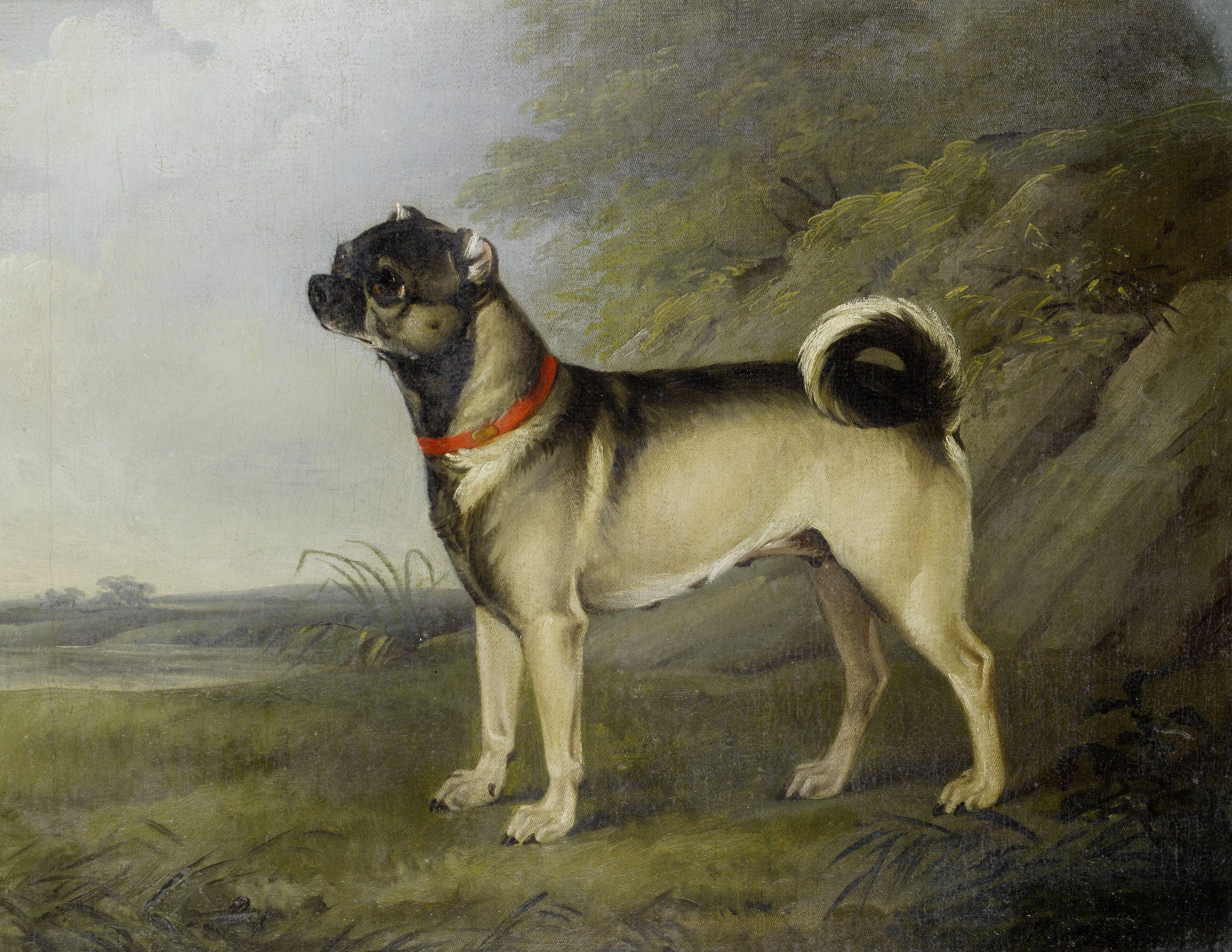
A Pug depicted in 1802, by Henry Bernard Chalon

The English painter William Hogarth was the devoted owner of a series of Pugs. His 1745 self-portrait, which is now in London's Tate Gallery, includes his Pug, Trump. The Pug was also well known in Italy. In 1789, author Hester Piozzi wrote in her journal: "The little Pug dog or Dutch mastiff has quitted London for Padua, I perceive. Every carriage I meet here has a Pug in it."

The popularity of the Pug continued to spread in France during the eighteenth century. Before her marriage to Napoleon Bonaparte, Joséphine had her Pug, Fortune, carry concealed messages to her family while she was confined at Les Carmes prison, it having alone been given visiting rights.

In nineteenth-century England, the breed flourished under the patronage of Queen Victoria. Her many Pugs, which she bred herself, included Olga, Pedro, Minka, Fatima and Venus. Her involvement with dogs in general helped to establish the Kennel Club, which was formed in 1873. Queen Victoria favored apricot and fawn colors. Her passion for Pugs was passed on to many other members of the royal family, including her grandson King George V and his son King Edward VIII. Many responded to the breed's image of anti-functionalism and diminutive size during that period.

In paintings and engravings of the 18th and 19th centuries, Pugs usually appear with longer legs and noses than today, and sometimes with cropped ears. That practice was carried out in Europe up until the 19th century, the intent being to accentuate the wrinkles of the forehead. The so-called "prince mark" – a set of wrinkles resembling the Chinese character for prince (王) – was a desirable attribute of the breed.

It was around this time that two prolific strains of Pug came to be known in Britain: the Morrison and Willoughby lines. Dogs of the Willoughby line were said to be of "bad colour", stone fawn with an excess of black on the head, whereas Morrison Pugs were a richer yellow fawn with well defined black masks.

The Morrison Pug was more in accordance with current breed type, being cobbier and shorter muzzled. In his book, The Dogs of the British Islands, J.H. Walsh writes that the first dog of the Willoughby line had "a face much longer than would now be approved of by Pug fanciers". Comparison of the two strains, as depicted in artwork from the time, provides a clearer image as to their distinct characteristics.

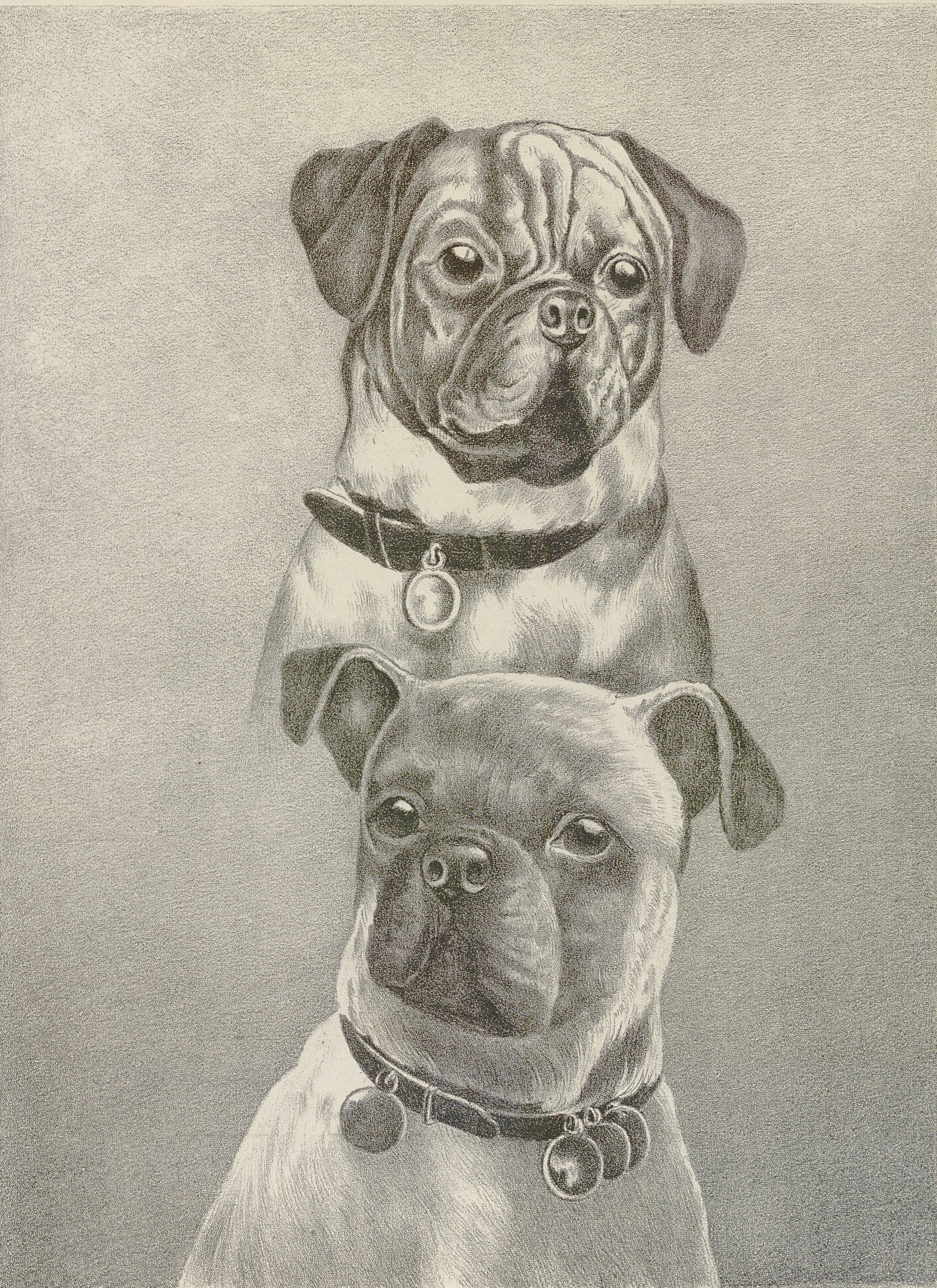
Pugs on an 1890 illustration

The modern Pug's appearance probably changed after 1860, when a new wave of dogs were seized as loot by French and British soldiers who razed the Old Summer Palace in Beijing (then Peking), China. They were "Happa dogs", or "Pekingese pugs" as they would come to be known by the western fancier. Those Pugs had shorter legs, the modern-style Pug nose and were often black and white in color.

The Happa dog probably constitutes a separate "strain" to the Pekingese, rather than a breed in its own right. W.E Mason remarks in his book "Dogs of all nations" that the Happa is "identical in every respect with the Pekingese Spaniel, except that his coat is short and smooth". The distinction between the long and short coated dogs was, most likely, imposed by the British as several Oriental scrolls depict long coated "Hap-pah" dogs.

Two of the most famous Happa dogs to be brought back to England were "Moss" and "Lamb" who were bred together to produce "Click". A popular stud, "Click" was bred several times to bitches of both Willoughby and Morrison lines, which is largely recognized as leading to the merging of both strains.

During that period, crossing with the English bulldog reportedly took place to solidify desirable traits in both breeds, though that improvement came at the expense of the Pugs diminutive stature. Pug dogs with a broader head and flatter muzzle were procured through those mixed pairings. However, many of them lacked the temperament typical of a lap dog on account of the bulldog's fiercer nature.

The British aristocrat, Lady Brassey, is also credited with making black Pugs fashionable after she brought some back from China in 1886.

Pugs arrived in the United States during the nineteenth century and were soon making their way into the family home and the show ring. The American Kennel Club recognized the breed in 1885. The Pug Dog Club of America was founded in 1931 and was recognized by the American Kennel Club that same year. In 1981, the Pug Dhandys Favorite Woodchuck won the Westminster Kennel Club Dog Show in the United States, the only Pug to have won there since the show began in 1877.

=== 21st century ===
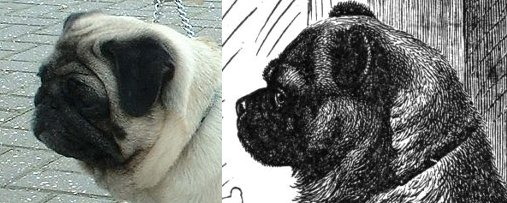
Comparison of Pug head 2003 (left) and 19th century (right)

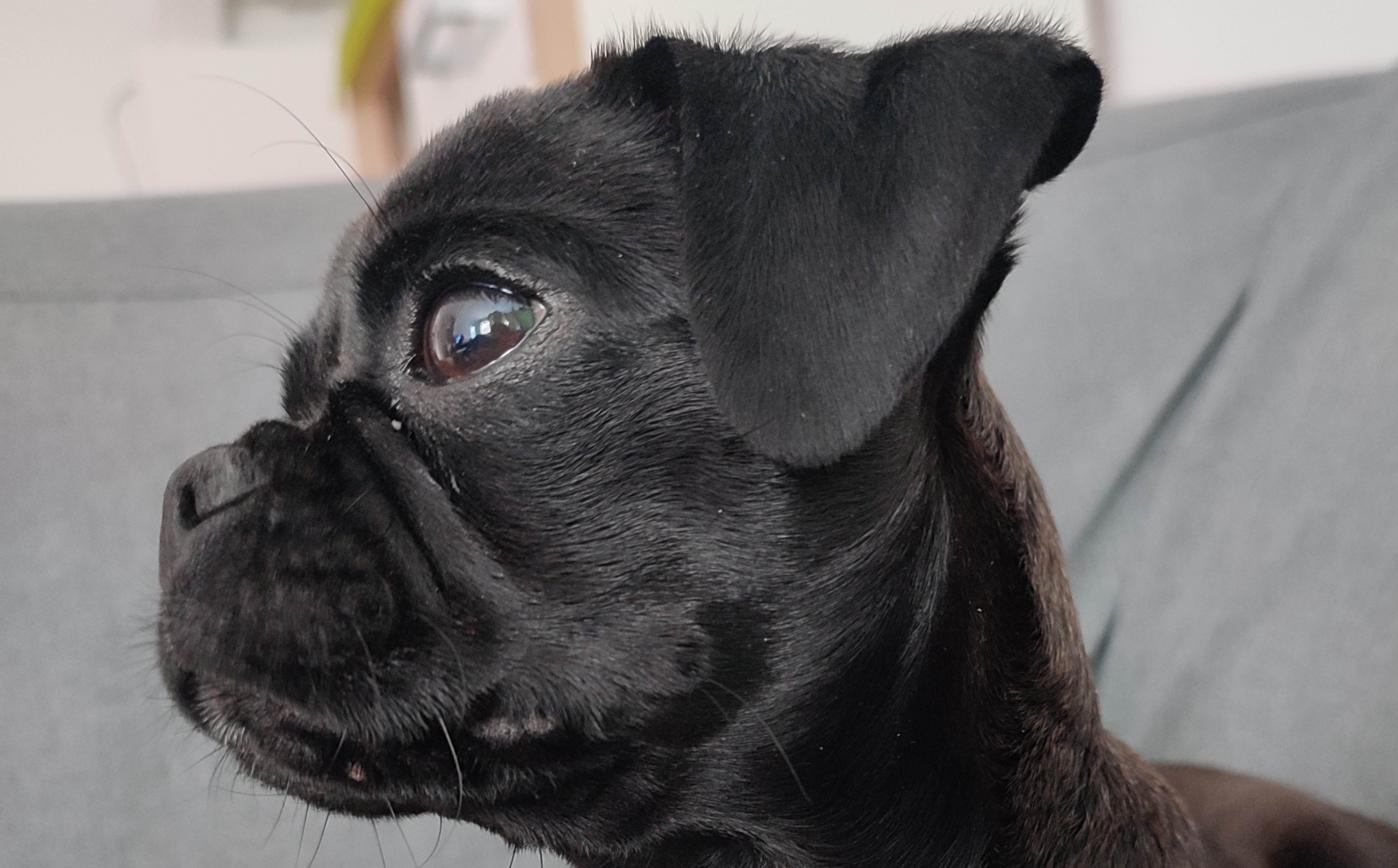
Side view of a retro Pug's longer snout, lesser bulging eyes and fewer wrinkles

The World Champion – or Best in Show – at the 2004 World Dog Show held in Rio de Janeiro, was a Pug named Double D Cinoblu's Masterpiece.

==== Retro Pugs ====
The breeding trend of Pugs led to shorter muzzles and shorter legs over time, with the dogs susceptible to some health problems. In 2023, the Netherlands placed limitations on the breeding of various short-faced breeds, including the conventional Pug. Since around 2006 there has been a counter-trend in some countries to breed "retro pugs". Breeders who pursue that change in the breed aim for longer snouts, less protruding eyes, straighter legs and fewer facial wrinkles.

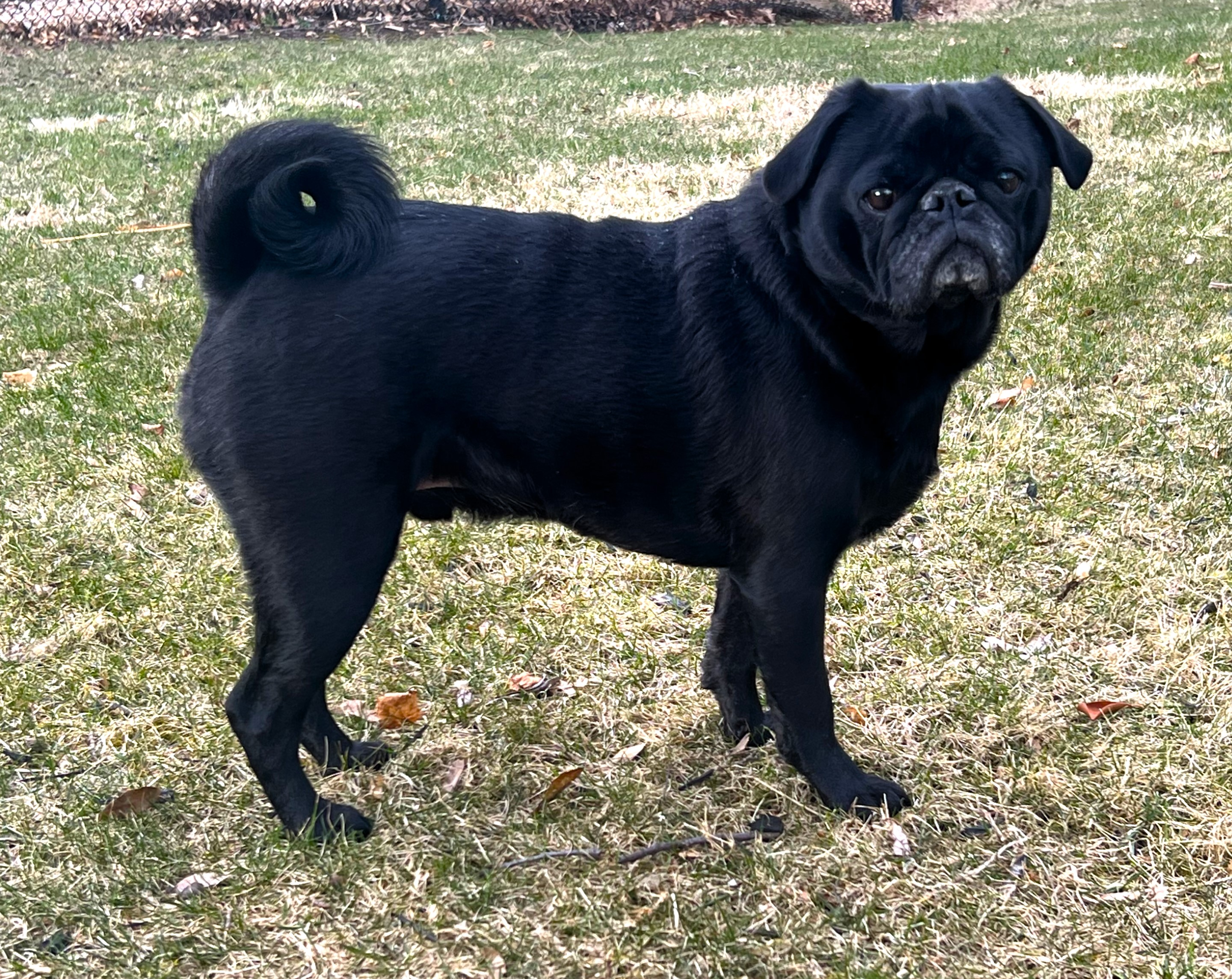
Side view of black Pug with longer legs and double curl tail

== Health problems ==
=== Brachycephaly ===
Since Pugs lack longer snouts and prominent skeletal brow ridges, they are susceptible to eye injuries such as proptosis, scratched corneas, and painful entropion. They are also prone to dry eyes, inflammation of the cornea, and corneal pigmentation, leading to vision impairment or blindness if untreated.

The shortened snout and pushed in face of the Pug is known as brachycephaly. Brachycephaly results in deformation of the upper airway tract and leads to obstruction of breathing. Potential effects of brachycephaly are stridor, stertorous breathing, emesis, skin fold dermatitis, brachycephalic airway obstructive syndrome, exophthalmos, pharyngeal gag reflex, cyanosis, and laryngeal collapse.

Other issues arising from brachycephaly are risk of complications whilst under anaesthesia, and hyperthermia – with the latter caused due to an inability to effectively reduce body temperature via panting. Their breathing problems can be worsened by the stresses of traveling in air cargo, which may involve high temperatures. Following the deaths of Pugs and other brachycephalic breeds, several airlines either banned their transport in cargo or enacted seasonal restrictions.

=== Obesity ===
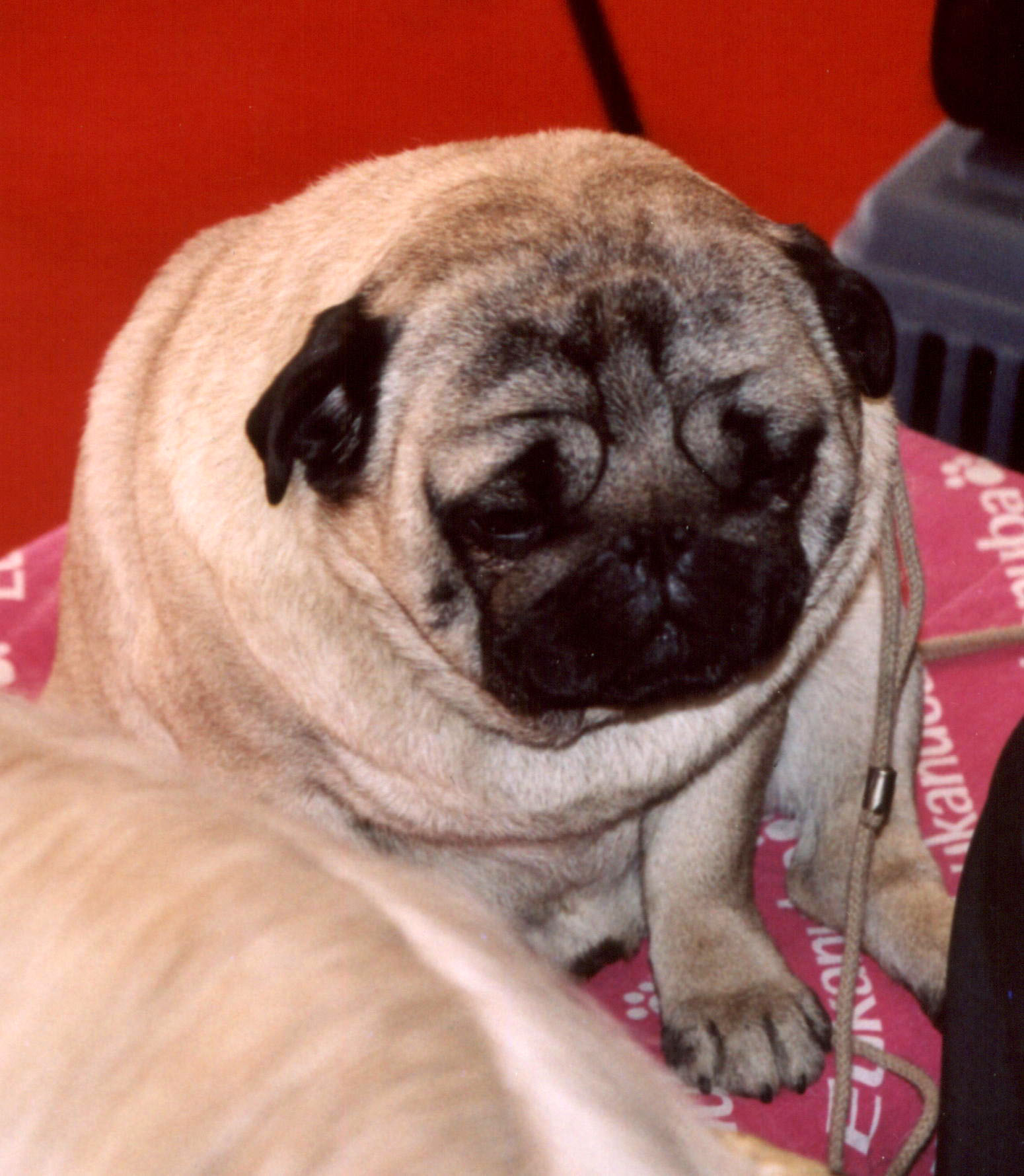
An overweight Pug

Research from the UK found that Pugs are more prone to obesity than other breeds. They are three times more likely to become obese, and one in every five Pugs are diagnosed as obese in a year. Obesity should be considered a health priority in Pugs because of the high prevalence, associated health problems and reversible nature of the disorder.

=== Life expectancy ===
A study in the UK of veterinary records found the Pug to have a life expectancy of 7.65 years – far below the general average of 11.23 years for dogs. Another UK study found a life expectancy of 11.6 years for the breed compared to an average of 12.7 for purebreeds and 12 for crossbreeds. A review of pet cemetery data in Japan found the Pug to have a life expectancy of 12.8 years, below the average of 13.7 years and lower than the average for small breeds.

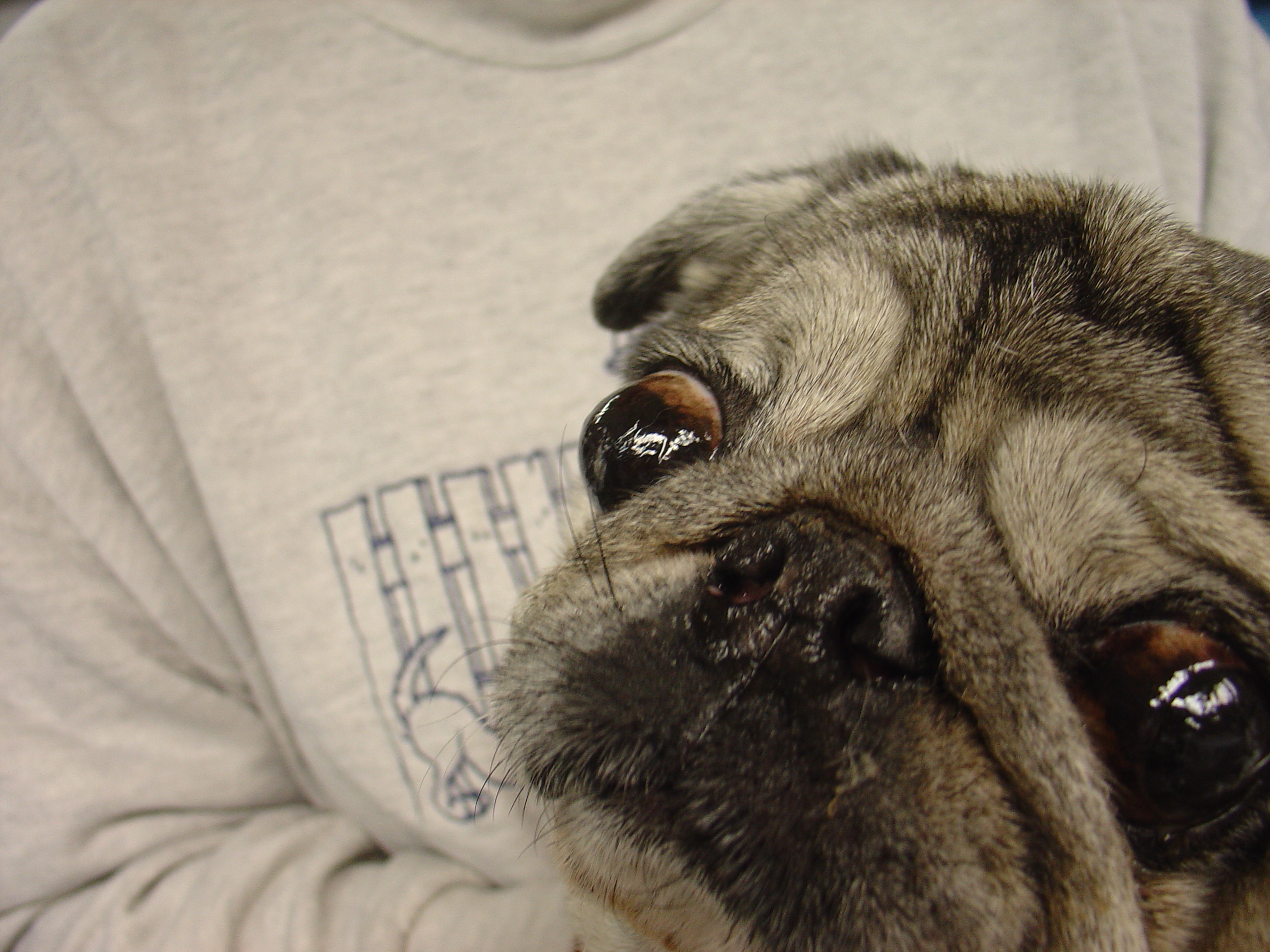
Protruding eyes in a Pug

=== Inbreeding depression ===
In 2008, an investigative documentary carried out by the BBC found significant inbreeding between pedigree dogs, with a study by Imperial College, London, showing that the 10,000 Pugs in the UK were so inbred that their gene pool was the equivalent of only 50 individuals.

=== Other conditions ===
An abnormal formation of the hip socket, known as hip dysplasia, affected nearly 64% of Pugs in a 2010 survey performed by the Orthopedic Foundation for Animals. The breed was ranked the second-worst-affected by the condition out of 157 breeds tested.

In a British study the Pug was found to be more susceptible to demodicosis. The prevalence of the condition in Pugs under two years was 1.9% compared to the 0.48% average, and for Pugs over four years it was 0.2% compared to the 0.05% average. Overall, the Pug had a prevalence of 1% compared to the 0.17% average.

Pugs can suffer from necrotizing meningoencephalitis (NME), also known as Pug Dog Encephalitis (PDE), an inflammation of the brain and meninges. NME is not unique to Pugs and also occurs in other small dogs, such as the Yorkshire Terrier, Maltese, and Chihuahua. NME affects roughly 1–2% of all Pugs.

The Pug is prone to hemivertebrae, a condition that can lead to pain as well as loss of function in the hind legs.

A UK study found the Pug to be at a 7.49 times greater risk of impaired hepatic perfusion compared to other dogs.

=== Birth and reproduction ===
Due to the relative size of neonatal skulls to the birth canal, Pugs are highly predisposed to requiring cesarean births.

== Historical depictions of Pugs ==
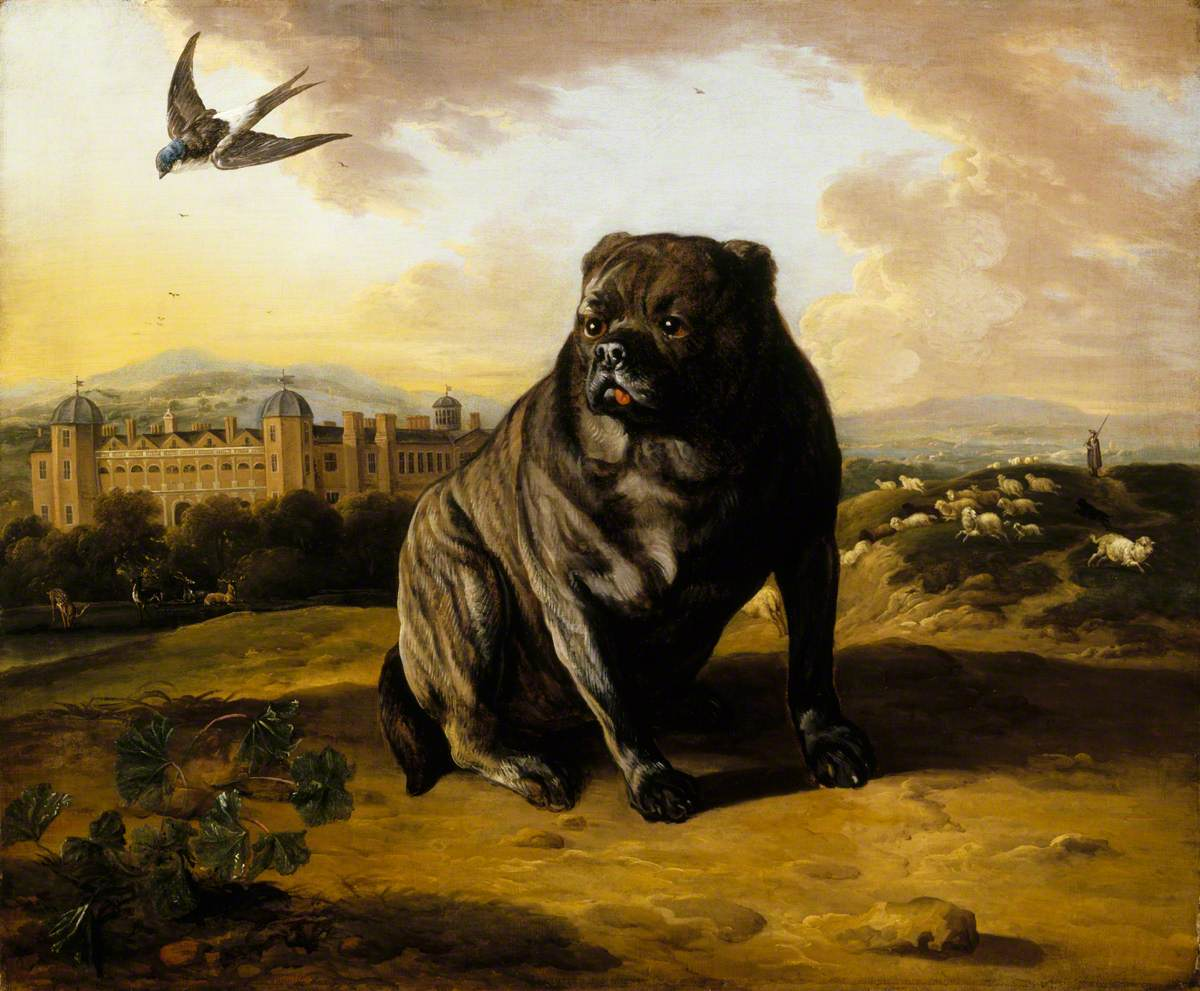
A Dutch Mastiff (called 'Old Vertue') with Dunham Massey in the Background" (Jan Wyck, 1700)

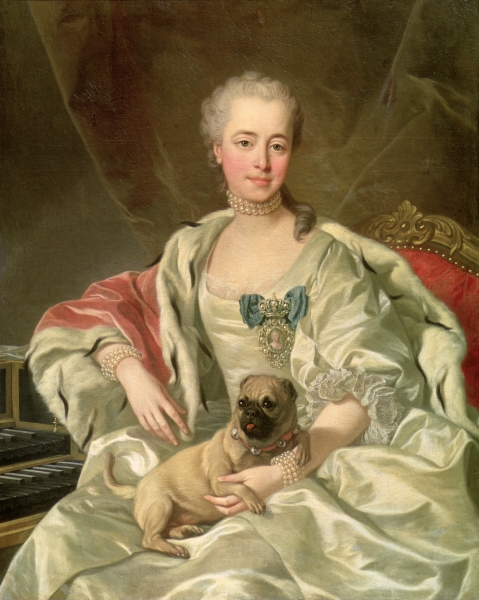
A portrait of Princess Ekaterina Golitsyna by Louis-Michel van Loo (1759)
Moscow, Pushkin Museum of Fine Arts

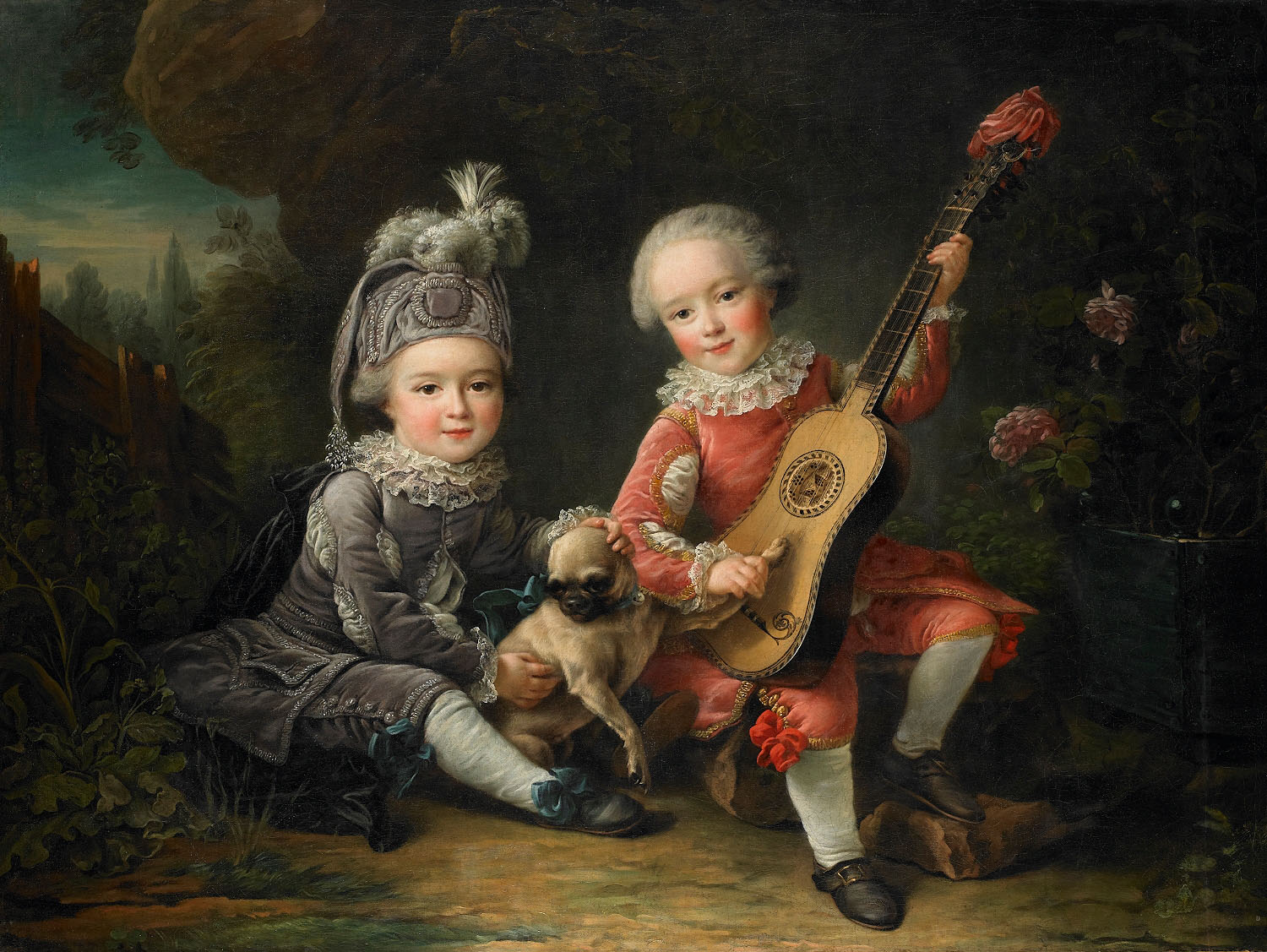
Children of the Marquis de Béthune with a Pug, 1761

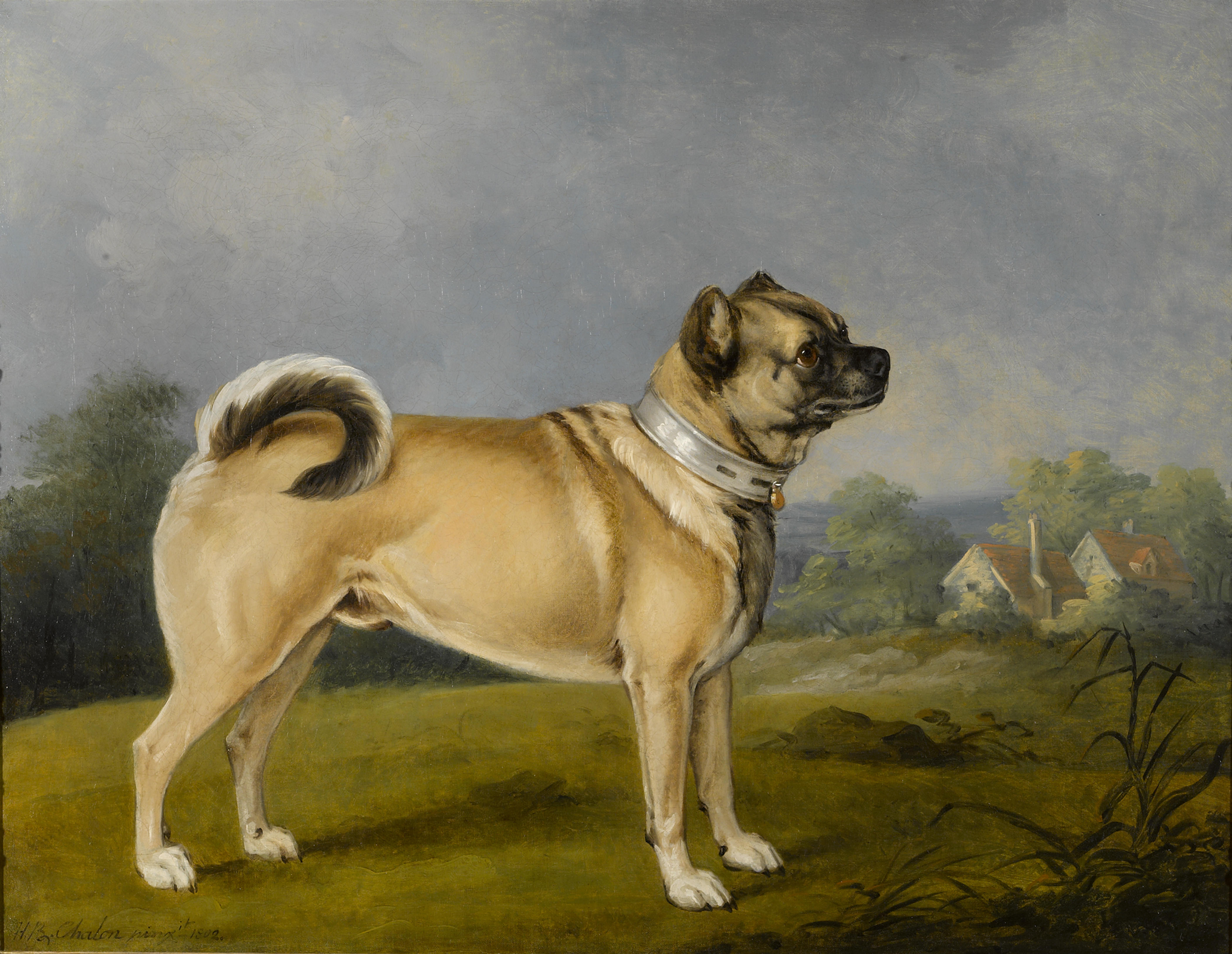
A male Pug, 1802

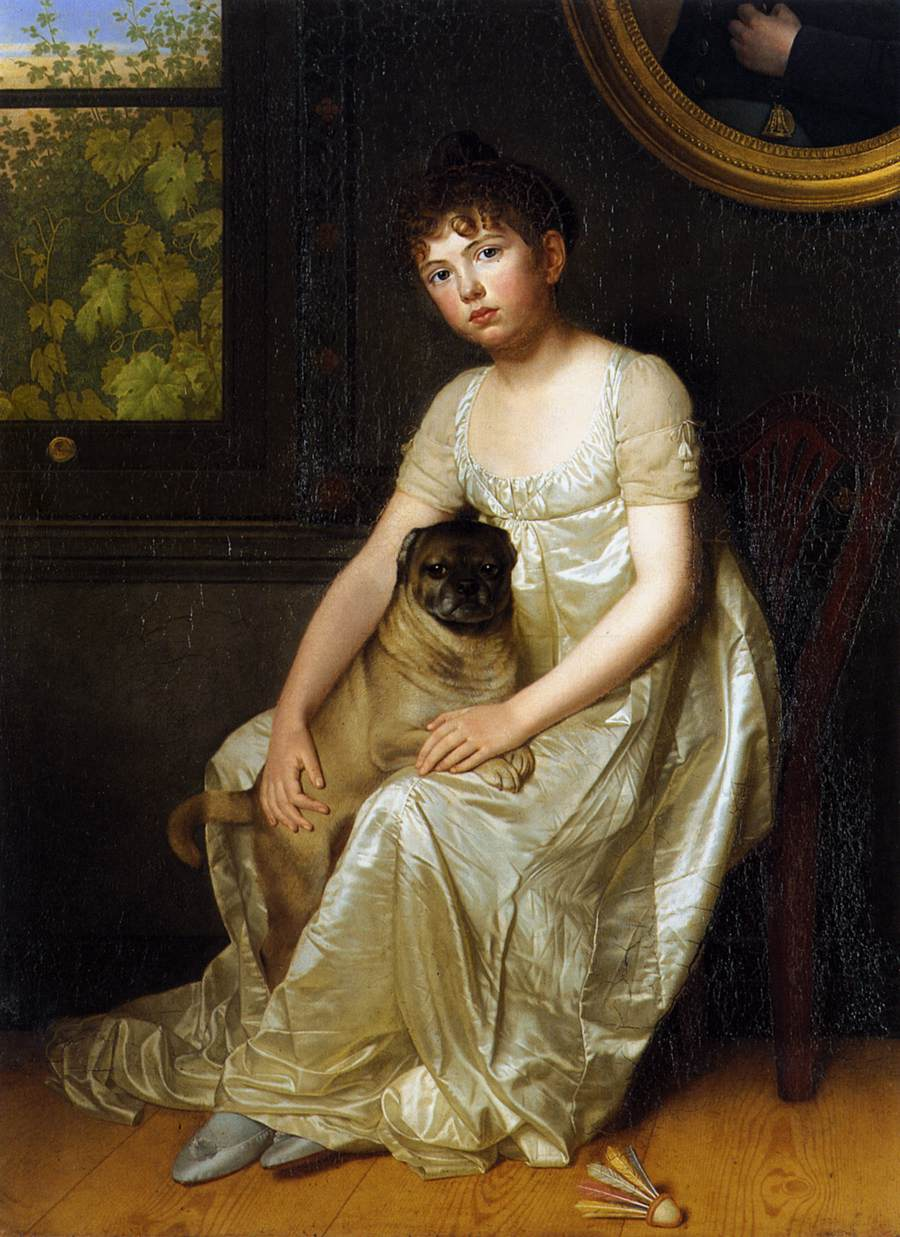
Portrait of Sylvie de la Rue, circa 1810

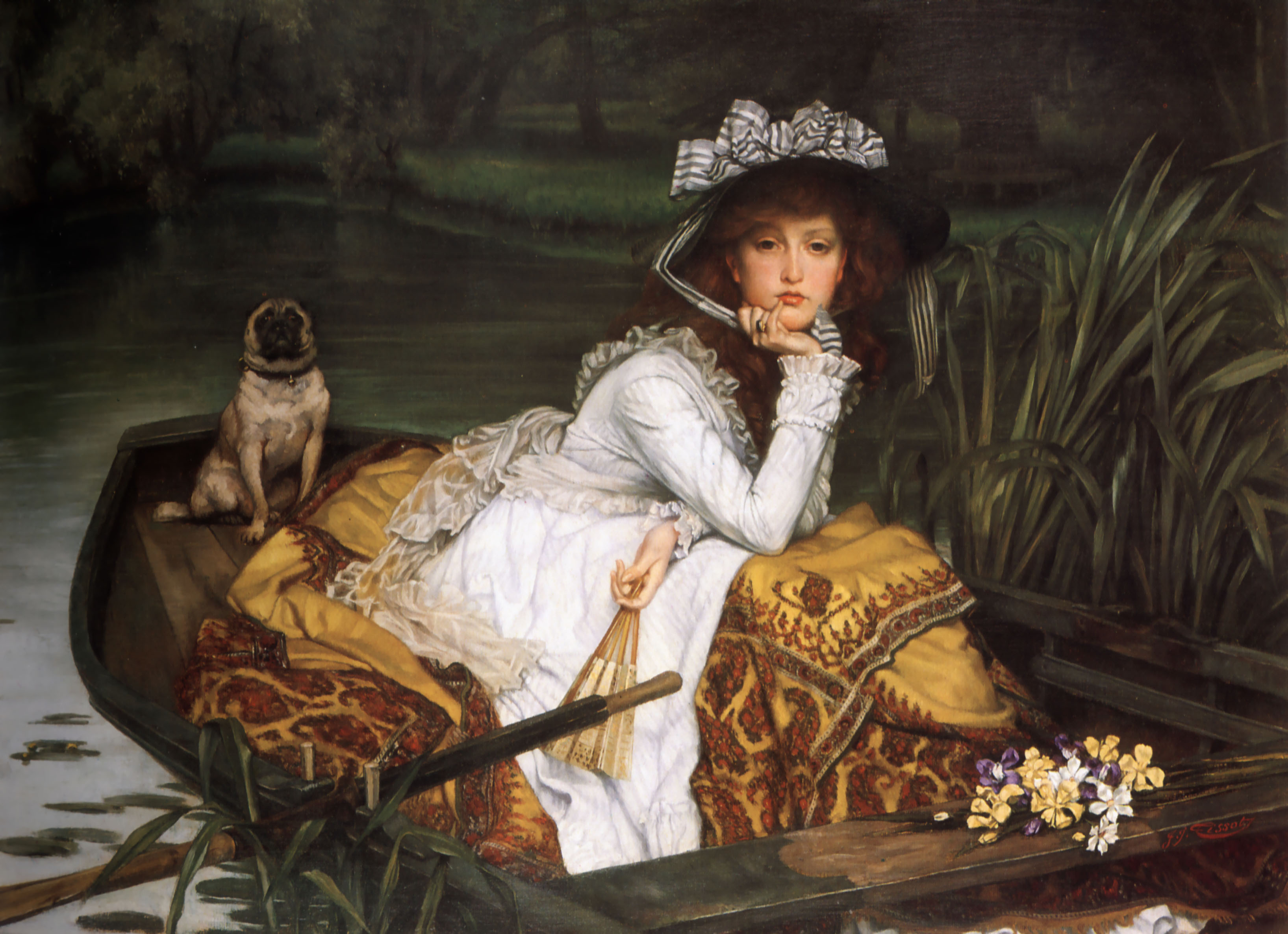
Young Lady in a Boat with a Pug by James Tissot, 1870

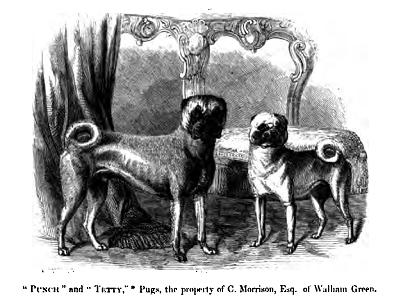
Engraving of the Pugs "Punch and Tetty" from the 1859 book "The Dog in Health and Disease"

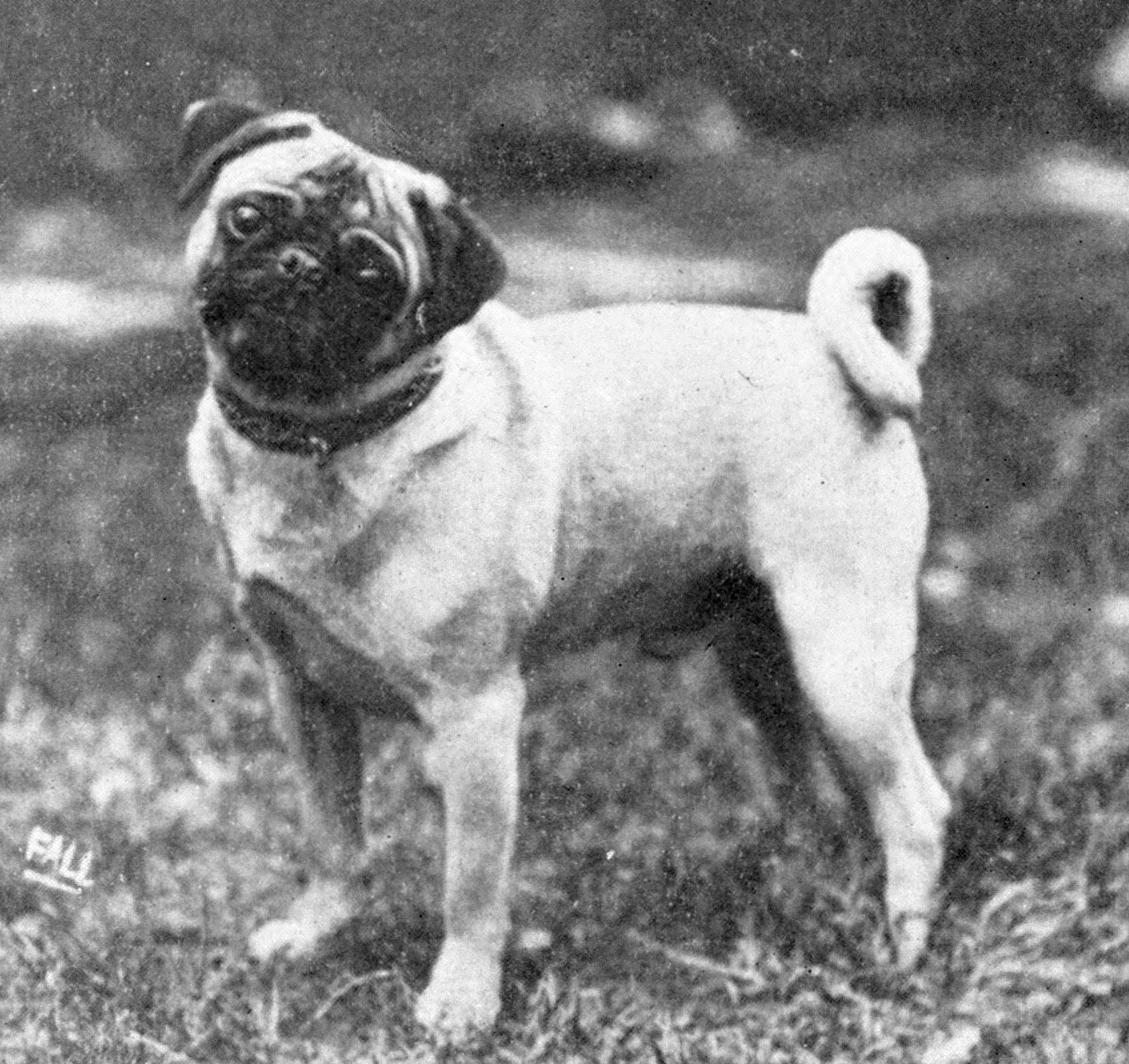
Pug from 1915.

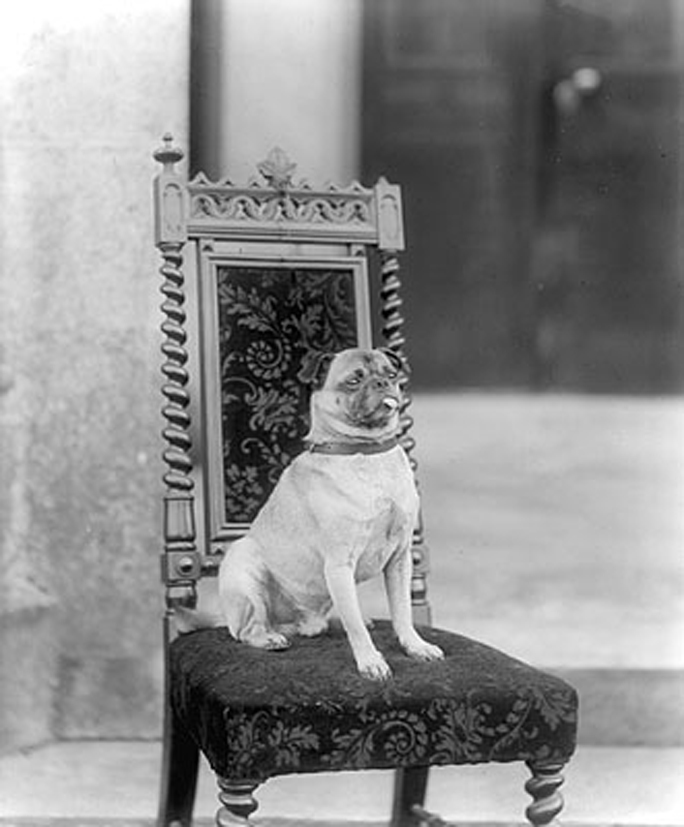
Pug photo, ca 1900. Note its small head and long legs.

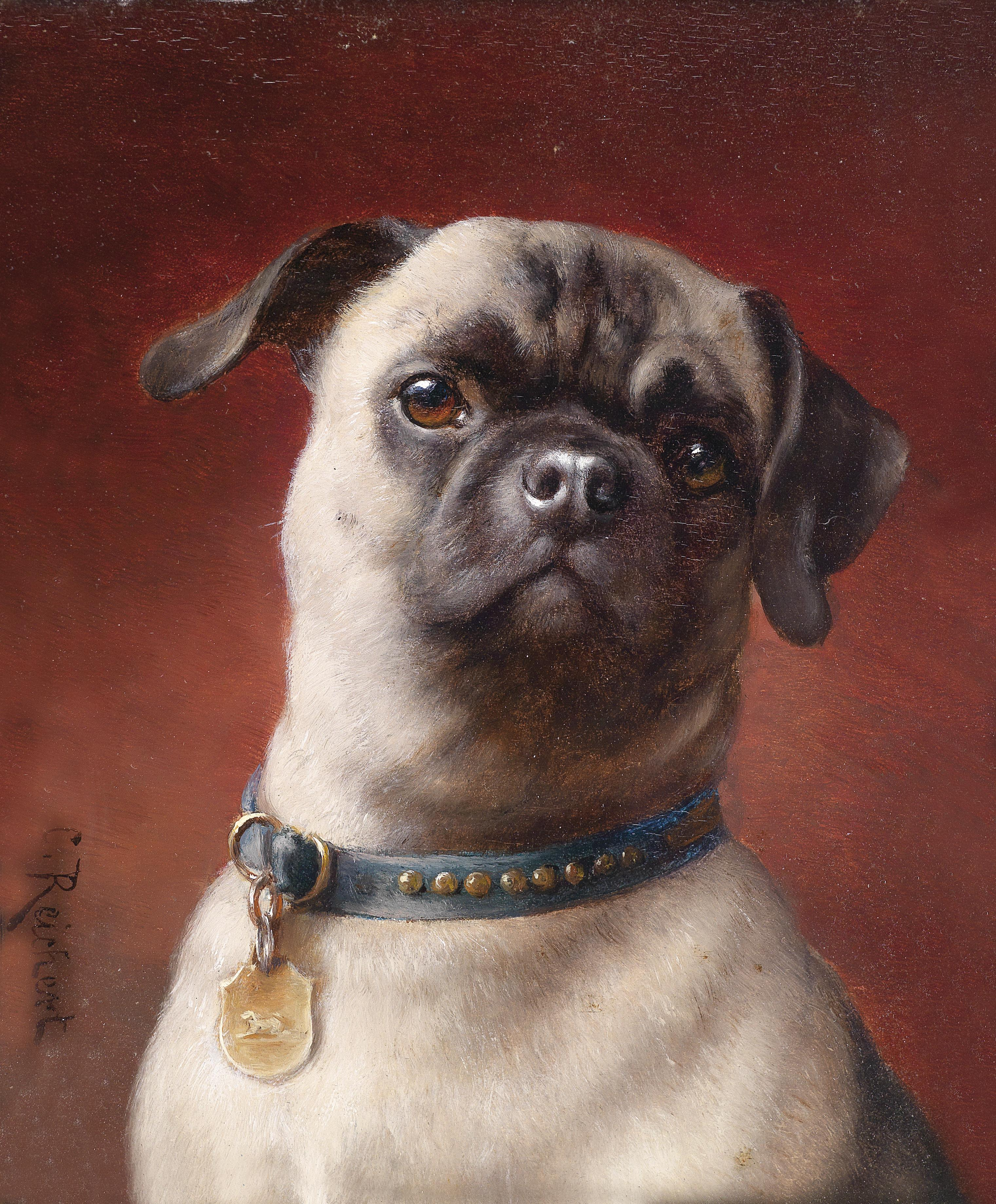
A Pug by Carl Reichert. (1836–1918)

== In popular culture ==
In Jane Austen's 1814 novel, Mansfield Park, Lady Bertram, the hero's mother, owned a pet Pug and was "thinking more of her Pug than her children".

The 1984 science-fiction film Dune included a Pug as a family pet; an inclusion which the director, David Lynch, "refuse[d] to answer" questions about.

A Pug named Willy appeared in the British soap opera EastEnders between 1985 and 1992. Willy was the constant companion of Ethel Skinner, played by Gretchen Franklin.

The 1989 film The Adventures of Milo and Otis features a Pug named Otis, known as "Poosky" in the original 1986 Japanese version, The Adventures of Chatran.

The Men in Black film series features Frank, a fictional talking Pug portrayed by animal actor Mushu.

The breed became iconic in India, as it was featured as the mascot in a series of Vodafone (formerly Hutchison Essar) advertising commercials directed by Prakash Varma. The Pug that was predominantly featured in the commercials was Cheeka. The advertisement campaign was followed by a rise in the popularity of Pugs in India, and the sale of Pugs more than doubled within months, with prices for Pugs rising considerably. A few other adverts also appeared in the following months, inspired by the idea of a dog following a boy.

The American television series The Lincoln Lawyer features a Pug named Winston.

A Pug is featured in the 2018 British comedy film Patrick.

== See also ==
- Companion dog
- Lap dog
- Order of the Pug
- Canis

== Notes ==
1.The Japanese study reviewed cemetery data which is unlikely to have any records of still-births and altricial deaths whilst a veterinary clinic likely would have data on these.
