= Late Visitors to Pompeii =

1931 painting by Carel Willink

- Late bezoekers van Pompeï (Dutch)
- Artist: Carel Willink
- Year: 1931
- Medium: Oil on canvas
- Dimensions: 92 cm × 142 cm (36 in × 56 in)
- Location: Museum Boijmans Van Beuningen; Rotterdam

Late Visitors to Pompeii (Dutch: Late bezoekers van Pompeï) is a 1931 painting by Carel Willink. It depicts four modern men at the forum of Pompeii with Mount Vesuvius in the background. The painting belongs to the Museum Boijmans Van Beuningen since 1933. It has been interpreted in correlation with the cultural philosophy of Oswald Spengler, who is one of the men in the painting, and themes of civilisational crisis in the fiction of Ferdinand Bordewijk.

== Background ==
The Dutch painter Carel Willink (1900–1983) was educated in Berlin in 1921–1923 and was in his early career involved in constructivism, an abstract art movement. From the mid-1920s he turned to figurative painting, taking inspiration from Italian painters such as Giorgio de Chirico, Carlo Carrà, Achille Funi and Felice Casorati. Willink's works became characterised by a form of neoclassicism that placed human figures in realistic landscapes and featured classical architecture. Willink read the first volume of The Decline of the West by the German philosopher Oswald Spengler in 1919 and it left an impression on his view of art history. Spengler portrayed European painting as undergoing its terminal phase. Willink agreed with Spengler's view that the decline of classical painting corresponded to a general decline in culture, but he did not share Spengler's disdain for democracy.

== Subject and composition ==
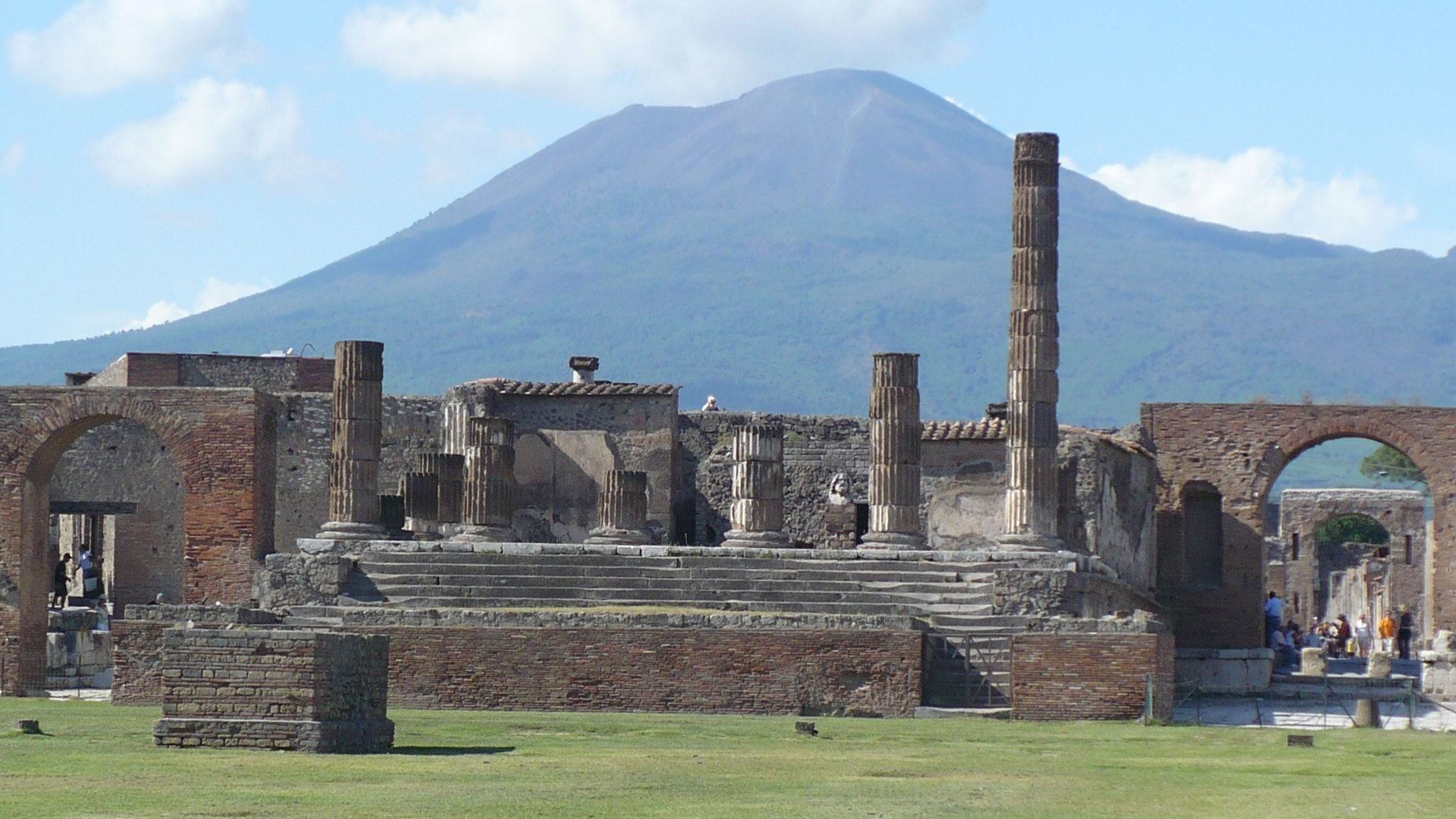
Pompeii's Temple of Jupiter with Vesuvius in the background

Willink painted Late Visitors to Pompeii in oil on canvas in 1931. It has the dimensions 92 cm × 142 cm (36 in × 56 in).

Late Visitors to Pompeii shows a scene from the ruins of Pompeii, the Roman city that was destroyed in the eruption of Mount Vesuvius in 79 AD and excavated in modern times. The location is the city's forum, surrounded by ruins and columns, facing the Temple of Jupiter. Behind the temple is a hilly landscape and at its centre Mount Vesuvius from which a smoke pillar emerges.

In the foreground are four men in modern suits, standing on a paved terrace and each looking in a different direction. A bald man with a cigar, identified as Spengler, is the only person who looks toward the temple ruin and active volcano. At his feet is a collection of archaeological tools. The man furthest to the left, who looks toward the viewer, is a self-portrait reminiscent of Willink's other self-portraits from the period. According to the painter's widow Sylvia Willink, the other men are also self-portraits: to the left is Willink as a young man, in the middle as he imagined himself in his middle age, and to the right as an old man.

== Provenance ==
In the first few years after its completion, Late Visitors to Pompeii was exhibited in Amsterdam, Paris, Arnhem, Groningen and Rotterdam. It was shown at a group exhibition at the Rotterdamse Kunstkring in 1933 and the same year the Museum Boijmans Van Beuningen in Rotterdam bought it. The museum's director Dirk Hannema was interested in Willink's works and made an effort to raise the necessary funds. The painting has been part of various later exhibitions, including exhibitions of Willink's works at the Museum Boijmans Van Beuningen in 1939 and 2000.

== Analysis and reception ==
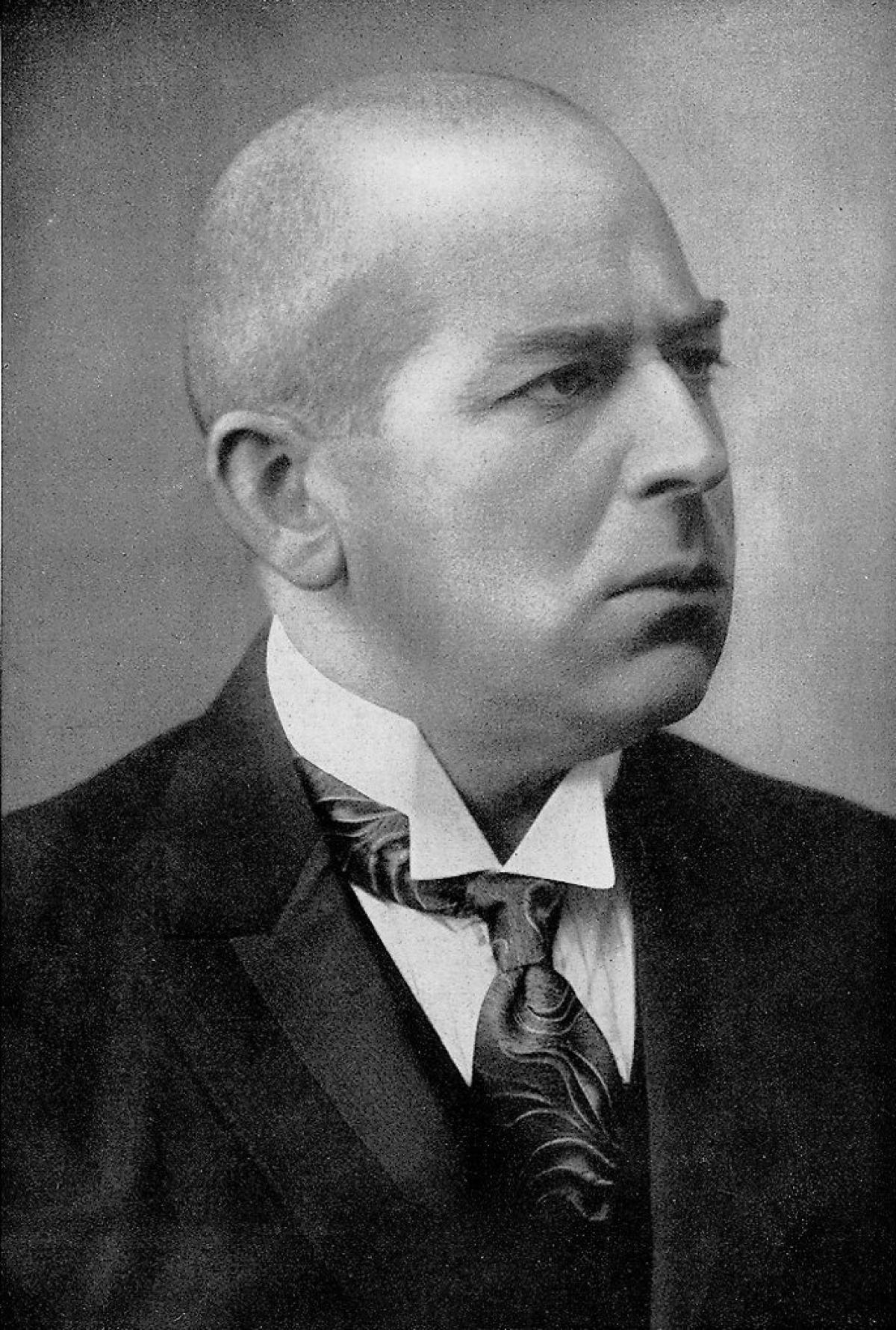
Oswald Spengler in 1929

The depiction of Pompeii—a recurring symbol for decadence and ruin—and the presence of Spengler in the picture have made critics interpret Late Visitors to Pompeii as a fatalistic comment about Western culture in decline. Writing for the Elsevier's Geïllustreerd Maandschrift in 1937, S. P. Abas said the painting displays Willink's complexity better than any of his other paintings. Abas said the painting uses charm and humour to comment on nature and civilisation and portray a moment where time and space have become unstable. The literary scholar Mathijs Sanders wrote in 2005 that Spengler's cyclical view of history, where every culture is born, blooms, decays and falls, is represented by the combination of Imperial Roman ruins and modern men in the same picture.

Beginning with Victor Varangot in 1947, several critics have associated Late Visitors to Pompeii with works by the writer Ferdinand Bordewijk, who openly based two of his stories on the Willink paintings The Yellow House and Château en Espagne. Varangot wrote that a theme of life and death expressed through the juxtaposition of two time periods in Late Visitors to Pompeii had influence on Bordewijk. Varangot and Sanders wrote that the painting's volcano can be viewed as a symbol for both destruction and regeneration, which Varangot connected to Bordewijk's Heraclitean worldview. Sanders argues that Late Visitors to Pompeii gave direct inspiration to Bordewijk's short story "Sodom; moraliteit van deze eeuw" (lit. 'Sodom; morality of this century'), published in the collection De wingerdrank (1937). Sanders writes that both Late Visitors to Pompeii and "Sodom" express a belief that Western civilisation is in crisis, anchored in the cultural philosophy of Spengler's The Decline of the West.

== See also ==
- Cultural pessimism
- Pompeii in popular culture
