= Sellia gens =

Ancient Roman family

The gens Sellia or Selia was an obscure plebeian family at ancient Rome. Members of this gens are mentioned in the time of Cicero, but none of them attained any of the higher offices of the Roman state.

== Praenomina ==
The main praenomina of the Sellii were Lucius and Gaius, the two most common names throughout all periods of Roman history. Other names regularly used by this gens included Sextus, Marcus, Publius, and Quintus, all of which were also quite common. Occurring less frequently were names such as Aulus, Decimus, and Titus. There seems to be one instance of Paullus used as a praenomen by one of the Sellii; although it was an old praenomen, by the late Republic and in Imperial times it was generally regarded as a cognomen.

== Members ==
This list includes abbreviated praenomina. For an explanation of this practice, see filiation.

- Aulus Sellius, (Note: Broughton, following Mommsen, gives his name as Marcus Asellius, reasoning that the 'M' for Marcus was lost in manuscripts of Livy following the accusative Tempanium. Asellius was a much more common gentilicium than Sellius, which otherwise is not heard from before the final century of the Republic.) a cavalry officer serving under Gaius Sempronius Atratinus, consul in 423 BC, was elected tribune of the plebs in 422, together with three of his colleagues, in the hopes of preventing Sempronius' prosecution by the tribune Lucius Hortensius for his actions in the war against the Volscians. Sellius and the others were only able to delay Sempronius' trial, as he was convicted in 420.
- Publius Selius, perhaps the brother of Gaius, was one of the friends of Lucullus who heard Philo speak at Rome, and whom Philo allowed to copy one of his manuscripts.
- Gaius Selius, perhaps the brother of Publius, copied Philo's manuscript after hearing him speak at Rome.
- Selius, a poor orator whom Cicero mentions in a letter to Publius Volumnius Eutrapelus in 51 BC.
- Selia, donated an altar to the temple of Fortuna at Falerii Novi in Etruria, dating between the late first century BC and the middle of the first century AD.
- Sellia Ephyre, an aurivestrix, or maker of clothing embellished with gold, whose shop was on the Via Sacra in Rome. Named on a funerary urn dating between the death of Augustus and the middle of the first century AD.
- Gaius Selius Rufus, named as consul in AD 41, alongside Quintus Ostorius Scapula, in an inscription from Thuburbo Maius in Africa Proconsularis, seems to be a mistake for Publius Suillius Rufus.
- Gaius Selius Hermes, aged forty, was buried in a first-century tomb at Rome.
- Marcus Selius Philadelphus, named in a first-century inscription from Rome.
- Lucius Selius Spinther, built a first-century tomb at Rome for himself and Ampliata.
- Lucius Sellius Gorgia, one of the priests of Minerva at Rome in AD 57, holding the office of magister for the third time.
- Gaius Selius Saturninus, a soldier stationed at Rome in AD 70, serving in the century of Decimus Roetius Secundus.
- Selia Q. l. Jucunda, a freedwoman named in a late first- or early second-century inscription from Concordia in Venetia and Histria.
- Sellia Porphyria, dedicated a second- or early third-century monument at Rome to her husband, aged eighty.
- Sellius Claudianus, one of the curators of public works at Rome in AD 193.
- Sellia Q. f. Satura, the wife of Marcus Aufidius Honoratus, and after his death, of his brother, Gaius Aufidius Honoratus, and the mother of Marcus Aufidius Honoratus, who dedicated a statue at Saldae in Mauretania Caesariensis in honor of his mother and stepfather, on the ninth day before the Kalends of January in AD 197.
- Sellia Celerina, buried at Rome, aged fifty-three, in a tomb dating between the middle of the second century and the end of the third.

=== Undated Sellii ===
- Selia Sex. f., named in an inscription from Hispellum in Umbria.
- Selius, named in an inscription from Thamugadi in Numidia.
- Publius Selius P. f., one of the pontifexes at Sutrium in Etruria.
- Gaius Sellius Acut[...], buried at Rome, with a monument from his wife, Sellia Edone.
- Gaius Sellius Aerastus, the husband of Sellia Helpis, and father of Sellia Primigenia, a little girl buried at Rome.
- Lucius Sellius D. f. Artorius, the son of Decimus Sellius Felix and Artoria Secundina, was buried at Laus Pompeia in Cisalpine Gaul, aged eight years, nine months.
- Marcus Sellius Atticus, buried at Messana in Sicily, aged twenty-five.
- Sellius Castus, the father of Aelia Festa, for whom he dedicated a tomb at Rome, together with her husband, Publius Aelius Patrocles.
- Selia M. l. Chia, a freedwoman buried at Salona in Dalmatia.
- Sextus Selius Sex. l. Epaphroditus, a freedman buried at Rome, together with Sextus Selius Nicephorus, and Selia Nice.
- Lucius Selius L. f. Eucaerus, a freedman buried at Rome.
- Sellia Euhodia, buried at Rome, with a monument from her daughter, Sellia Nape.
- Sellia Felicula, built a tomb at Rome for her husband, Marcus Pomponius Laetus, aged forty.
- Selia T. l. Felix, a freedwoman named in an inscription from Rome.
- Decimus Sellius Felix, the husband of Artoria Secundina, and father of Lucius Sellius Artorius, a child buried at Laus Pompeia.
- Lucius Selius L. f. Fortis, a freedman buried at Rome.
- Gaius Sellius Helius, the husband of Juventia Ilias, named in an inscription from Rome.
- Sellia Helpis, the wife of Gaius Sellius Aerastus, and mother of Sellia Primigenia, a little girl buried at Rome.
- Lucius Selius Hermes, named in a funerary inscription from Rome.
- Lucius Sellius Hermes, the husband of Herennia Eutychia, and father of Sellius Valentinus, with whom he dedicated a tomb for his wife at Salona.
- Gaius Sellius Hilarus, built a tomb at Rome for himself and Gaius Sellius Latinus, aged twenty-four.
- Sextus Selius Sex. f. Homullinus, a little boy buried at Lugdunum in Gallia Lugdunensis, aged four years and forty days, with a monument from his parents.
- Marcus Sellius L. f. Honoratus, a native of Choba in Mauretania Caesariensis, was a cavalry prefect serving in Hispania Citerior, where he donated to the building of a foundation for the temple of Hercules at Petavonium.
- Gaius Sellius Latinus, buried at Rome, aged twenty-four, in a tomb built by Gaius Sellius Hilarus.
- Sellia C. f. Nape, dedicated a tomb at Rome for her mother, Sellia Euhodia.
- Sellia Nice, the wife of Gaius Sellius Onesimus, was buried at Rome, aged thirty-five years, six months, and twenty-one days, with a tomb built by her husband.
- Selia Sex. l. Nice, a freedwoman buried at Rome, together with Sextus Selius Epaphroditus and Sextus Selius Nicephorus.
- Sextus Selius Sex. l. Nicephorus, a freedman buried at Rome, together with Sextus Selius Epaphroditus and Selia Nice.
- Gaius Sellius Onesimus, a flaturarius, or founder, and the husband of Sellia Nice, for whom he built a tomb at Rome.
- Lucius Sellius L. f. P[...] Appenninus, named in an inscription from Tibur.
- Selia Q. l. Prima, named in an inscription from Rome.
- Sellia C. f. Primigenia, the young daughter of Gaius Sellius Aerastus and Sellia Helpis, buried at Rome, aged two.
- Lucius Selius L. l. Primus, a freedman buried at Rome, together with Selia Tyche.
- Selia Secunda, together with Aulus Selius Theophilus, made an offering to Sarrius, god of the Sarrius river, at Bergomum in Cisalpine Gaul.
- Selia Sexta, buried at the present site of Andancette, formerly part of Gallia Narbonensis, with tomb dedicated by her husband, Alcius Sabinianus, with whom she lived for twenty-three years, five months, and twenty-one days, and her brother, Sextinus.
- Paullus Sellius Tertius, a centurion named in an inscription from Ulpia Trajana in Germania Inferior.
- Aulus Selius Theophilus, together with Selia Secunda, made an offering to Sarrius at Bergomum.
- Selia L. l. Tyche, a freedwoman buried at Rome, together with Lucius Selius Primus.
- Sellius L. f. Valentinus, the son of Lucius Sellius Hermes, with whom he dedicated a tomb at Salona for his mother, Herennia Eutychia.
- Selia Victorina, buried at Rome, aged about thirty-three, with a monument from her husband, Aurelius Felix, with whom she lived for fifteen years.

== See also ==
- List of Roman gentes

== Bibliography ==
- Marcus Tullius Cicero, Academica Priora, Epistulae ad Familiares.
- Titus Livius (Livy), History of Rome.
- Dictionary of Greek and Roman Biography and Mythology, William Smith, ed., Little, Brown and Company, Boston (1849).
- Theodor Mommsen et alii, Corpus Inscriptionum Latinarum (The Body of Latin Inscriptions, abbreviated CIL), Berlin-Brandenburgische Akademie der Wissenschaften (1853–present).
- Giovanni Battista de Rossi, Inscriptiones Christianae Urbis Romanae Septimo Saeculo Antiquiores (Christian Inscriptions from Rome of the First Seven Centuries, abbreviated ICUR), Vatican Library, Rome (1857–1861, 1888).
- Bullettino della Commissione Archeologica Comunale in Roma (Bulletin of the Municipal Archaeological Commission of Rome, abbreviated BCAR), (1872–present).
- Notizie degli Scavi di Antichità (News of Excavations from Antiquity, abbreviated NSA), Accademia dei Lincei (1876–present).
- René Cagnat et alii, L'Année épigraphique (The Year in Epigraphy, abbreviated AE), Presses Universitaires de France (1888–present).
- George Davis Chase, "The Origin of Roman Praenomina", in Harvard Studies in Classical Philology, vol. VIII, pp. 103–184 (1897).
- Anna and Jaroslav Šašel, Inscriptiones Latinae quae in Iugoslavia inter annos MCMXL et MCMLX repertae et editae sunt (Inscriptions from Yugoslavia Found and Published between 1940 and 1960, abbreviated ILJug), Ljubljana (1963–1986).
- T. Robert S. Broughton, The Magistrates of the Roman Republic, American Philological Association (1952–1986).
- Irma Bitto, Le Iscrizioni Greche e Latine di Messina (The Greek and Latin Inscriptions of Messina), Dipartimento di Scienze dell'antichita dell'Universita di Messina (2001).
