= Pompey (disambiguation) =

Pompey, otherwise known as Pompey the Great, was a Roman statesman.

Pompey may also refer to:

== People ==
- Sextus Pompey, son of Pompey the Great
- Pompeia gens, other people whose name, "Pompeius", may be rendered as "Pompey"

=== Athletes ===
- Adam Pompey (born 1998), New Zealand professional rugby league footballer
- Aliann Pompey (born 1978), Guyanese sprinter
- Dalton Pompey (born 1992), Canadian baseball player
- Fred Elliott (footballer) (1879–1960), Australian rules footballer in the Victorian Football League with the nickname Pompey
- Tristan Pompey (born 1997), Canadian baseball player
- Yolande Pompey (1929–1979), boxer from Trinidad & Tobago

=== Military figures ===
- Harold Elliott (1878–1931), Australian World War I general nicknamed Pompey
- Pompey Factor (1849–1928), United States Army Indian Scout

=== Other people ===
- Tali Tali Pompey (1940s–2011), Aboriginal artist from central Australia

== Places ==
- HMNB Portsmouth, nicknamed Pompey, a naval base in the city of Portsmouth, England
- Portsmouth, nicknamed Pompey, a city on the south coast of England
- Pompey, Meurthe-et-Moselle, a town in Meurthe-et-Moselle department, Lorraine, France
- Pompey, New York, a town in Onondaga County, New York, United States
- Theatre of Pompey, the first permanent theatre to be built in Rome

== Animals ==
- Pompey (dog), the dog of William The Silent, the Prince of Orange
- Pompey (horse), American champion racehorse

== Arts, entertainment, and media ==
- Pompey, a 1993 novel by Jonathan Meades
- Pompey, a character in The Man Who Shot Liberty Valance, played by Woody Strode
- Pompey, a character in the webcomic The Order of the Stick
- Pompey Bum, a character in Measure for Measure by William Shakespeare
- Gnaeus Pompeius Magnus (character of Rome), character in the television series Rome

== Sports ==
- Portsmouth F.C., a professional association football club in the city of Portsmouth, England, formed in 1898 and nicknamed Pompey
  - The Pompey Chimes, a football chant used by Portsmouth F.C. supporters
- Royal Artillery (Portsmouth) Football Club, an 1890s British Army amateur association football club in the city of Portsmouth, England, nicknamed Pompey

== Other uses ==
- Pompey, northern England slang for a prison
- Pompeian, Inc., a food company
- Pompeian era, a calendar era

== See also ==
- Pompeii (disambiguation)
- Pompeia (disambiguation)
- Pompeius (disambiguation)
- Pompee (disambiguation)
