= Sextus Pompeius (disambiguation) =

Sextus Pompeius may refer to:

- Sextus Pompeius Magnus Pius, or Sextus Pompey, (67–35 BC), Roman general
- Sextus Pompeius Festus (fl. 2nd century AD), Roman grammarian
- Sextus Pompeius, paternal uncle of the triumvir Gnaeus Pompeius Magnus ("Pompey"), and other relatives of the same name

== See also ==
- Pompeius (disambiguation)
- Sextus
