= Pompeius (disambiguation) =

Pompeius, or Pompey (106 BC–48 BC), was a leading Roman general and statesman.

Pompeius may also refer to:

- Pompeia gens, a plebeian family of ancient Rome, with a list of notable people with the name, including:
  - Pompeius (consul 501) (died 532), consul of the Eastern Roman Empire
- Pompeius (butterfly), a genus of skippers

== See also ==
- Pompeia
- Pompey (disambiguation)
- Pompeii (disambiguation)
- Pompeia (disambiguation)
- Sextus Pompeius (disambiguation)
