= Cheeka (dog) =

Dog used in Hutchison Essar advertisements

A still in which Cheeka follows a boy to a barber shop

Cheeka is a pug who appeared in the "You & I" advertising campaign of Hutchison Essar's cellular service in India, along with the child actor Jayaram. The dog follows the boy to unlikely locations, prompting the tagline, "Wherever you go, our network follows." The duo first appeared on TV, billboards, newspapers and bus shelters in 2003. The campaign was created by Mahesh V. and Rajeev Rao, senior creative directors at Ogilvy & Mather, Mumbai. The commercials were directed by Prakash Varma. The dog was born in the United Kingdom and is owned by Vishal and Lisa Bandekar in Goa.

== Conception ==
Several telecommunications companies were competing for a share of the rapidly growing mobile phone market in India during the early 2000s. Hutch hired Ogilvy & Mather in Mumbai to create an advertisement campaign focusing on this theme. Mahesh V. and Rajeev Rao, senior creative directors at the agency, spent a whole night developing the idea. "We did not want to talk about technology, and we consciously avoided showing people talking on the mobile", says Mahesh. Their initial idea was a younger sister following an older brother. "On second thoughts, we concluded that a dog would be much less mushy", adds Mahesh. This led to the slogan, "Wherever you go, our network follows", and the idea of a dog following a boy everywhere. "Man's best friend was the simplest analogy that could represent unconditional support", says Renuka Jaypal, National Business Director of O&M.

The first television ad was shot as a 1-minute sequence in Goa. The role of the boy was played by Jayaram, who had already starred in four other ads. Cheeka was suggested for the role by an assistant at Nirvana Films, the makers of the ad. The campaign was soon followed by a print version for newspapers. Cheeka earned ₹150,000 for the campaign, and appeared in Hutch ads, until the merger with Vodafone India, representing the network.

== Reception ==
The campaign was well received in India. "To me the magic of this campaign is its simplicity", says Piyush Pandey, National Creative Director of O&M. "It impacts your emotional retina in such a way that you enjoy it while it is happening", adds advertising legend Alyque Padamsee. "There was something about Cheeka that was very enduring and also there was an instant rapport with the kid", says Jaypal. Padamsee adds, "You rarely see pugs in ads because they are ugly. This goes against the grain and that's why it clicks." The campaign was ranked the Top Print Ad of 2003 and among the Top 10 TV Campaigns of 2003 in India by Business Today.

The ad is similar to the approach used by Fido Solutions, a major mobile service provider in Canada. It is also similar to the concept of network technicians following the customer in recent Verizon Wireless ads in the US.

== Legacy ==
The ad campaign increased the popularity of pugs in India, and the sale of pugs doubled rapidly, with prices going from roughly ₹10,000 to ₹60,000. A few other ads also appeared in the following months, inspired by the idea of a dog following a boy. In addition, Cheeka was the wallpaper most often downloaded by Hutch customers onto their phone screens in 2005.

== See also ==
- Verizon Wireless § Advertising
- List of individual dogs
