= Pompee =

Pompee or variant thereof, may refer to:

- French ship Pompée (1791), a French Navy Téméraire-class ship-of-the-line
- HMS Pompee (1793), a UK Royal Navy Pompée-class ship-of-the-line
- La Mort de Pompée, 17th century French play by Pierre Corneille
- Pompée-class ship of the line, a class of warship for the UK Royal Navy
- Pompée Valentin Vastey, a Haitian writer
- Pompey, Roman triumvir

== See also ==
- Pompeii (disambiguation)
- Pompey (disambiguation)
