= Pompeia Helena =

1st-century Roman goldsmith

Pompeia Helena was a goldsmith, who worked in Rome during the time of the Roman Empire, around the first century CE.

== Death ==
Pompeia Helena is only known from her grave inscription in Rome, where she is identified as an aurifix (goldsmith). The inscription appears as part of the monument to Marcella, daughter of Octavia, which is found in the second section of the columbaria of Vigna Codini. She is believed to have been a freedwoman, from the Pompeia family.

The inscription reads:

Pompeia Cn (aei) l (iberta) Helena
aur (i) ficis Caesaris

Other artisans are found as part of the same monument, including: a margaritarius (pearl diver; pearl dealer), two vestiarii (clothes sellers), two unguentarii and a thurarius (frankincense dealer). The mosaic floor includes an inscription that indicates a terminus ante quem of 10 CE.

== Historiography ==
Pompeia Helen is not the only woman known to have worked as a goldsmith in ancient Rome, others included: Serapa, Sellia Epyre, Vincentia. However, doubt has been placed on her role by John K Evans, who questioned whether aurifix means goldsmith in this context, or whether it might mean "custodian of gold ware".
