= Pompeia (disambiguation) =

Pompeia is the name of several ancient Roman women.

Pompeia may also refer to:

- Pompeia gens, an ancient Roman family
- Pompeia, São Paulo, a municipality in Brazil
- Pompeia, an 1889 recreation of a structure from ancient Pompeii
- Núria Pompeia (1931–2016), Spanish cartoonist and journalist
- Raul Pompeia (1863–1895), Brazilian writer

== See also ==
- Pompeius
- Pompeius (disambiguation)
