= Sellia Epyre =

Roman craftswoman (1st cent.)

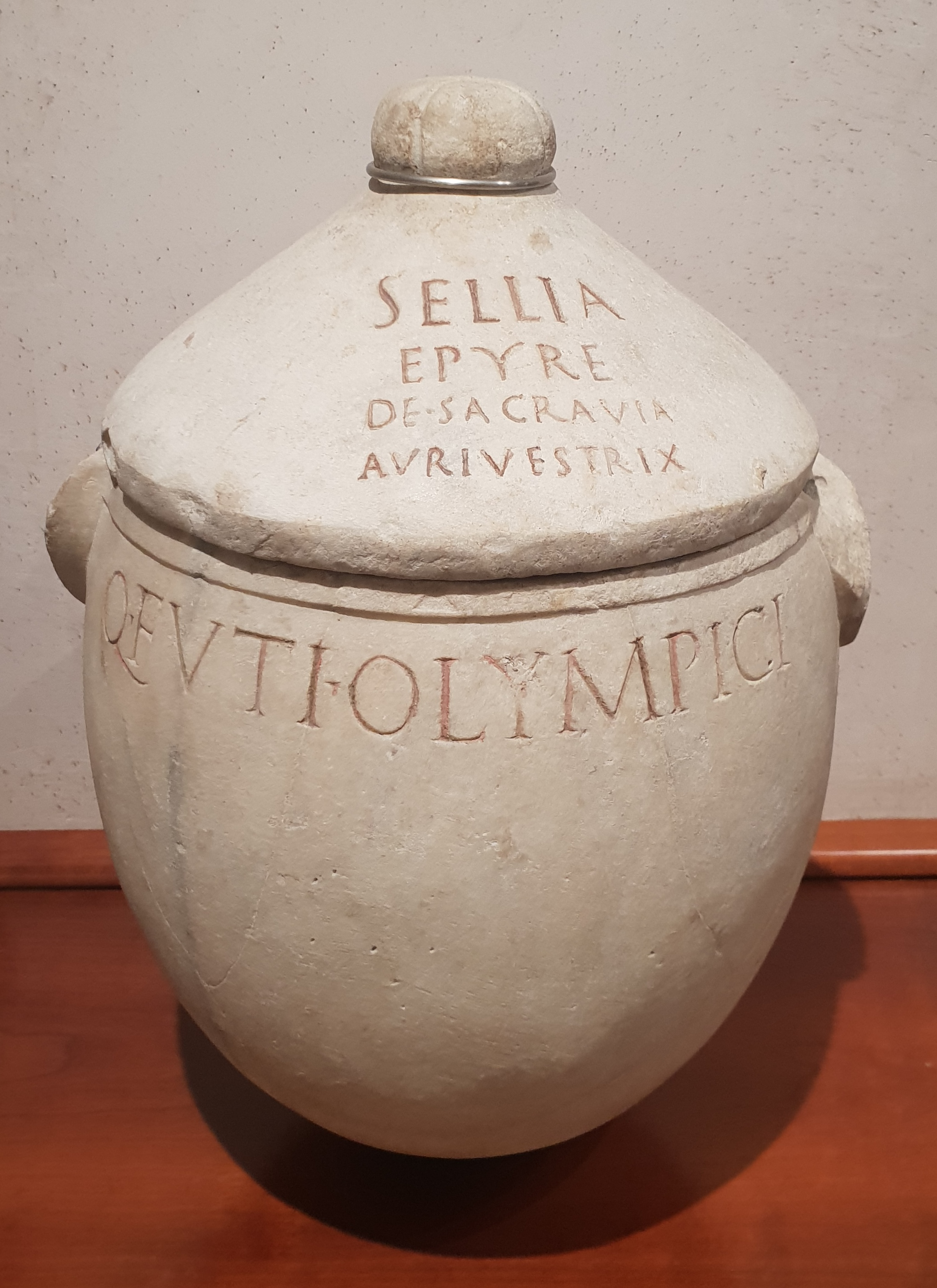
Cinerary urn commemorating Sellia Epyre

Sellia Epyre (1st century AD) was a Roman craftswoman who operated a business on the Via Sacra producing embroidery in gold thread. She is known from two funerary inscriptions.

== Speculative biography ==
Sellia Epyre operated in the first century AD. Her byname, Epyre or Ephyre, is of Greek origin, so it has been suggested that she was a freedwoman.

She seems to have been married to a man named Q. Futius Olympicus. He should not be confused with Quintus Futius Lusius Saturninus, although the name may indicate a connection with the gens Futia; Olli Salomies has argued that Saturninus was adopted by a Quintus Futius, and an inscription attests a Quintus Futius as suffect consul between AD 49 and 54.

Her occupation is given as aurivestrix, which has been interpreted as 'gold-embroiderer,' 'specialist in gold embroidery,' 'embroiderer in gold thread,' 'goldsmith,' and 'skilled worker in gold.' Hers is the only recorded instance of this term, suggesting a high degree of specialisation.

Her workshop was on the Via Sacra in Rome, which was a commercial district leading to the forum where luxury products were in demand. Sellia must have had access to considerable capital and made specialist products for wealthy patrons.

She is one of several Roman women attested by inscriptions as workers in gold, along with Pompeia Helena, Serapa, and Vicentia.

== Attestations ==
- A marble cinerary urn reads on the lid, 'Sellia Epyre, dressmaker in gold in the Via Sacra'. On the body of the urn is the male name Q. Futus Olympicus in the genitive case. This has been interpreted as meaning either that Q. Futus Olympicus made the urn for his wife Sellia, or that Sellia made the urn for him and had her ashes added to it on her death.
- A marble plaque in a columbarium on the Via Appia reads 'Sellia Ephyre of the Via Sacra,' indicating that she owned the niche above the plaque.
