= Pompeii in popular culture =

Karl Brullov, The Last Day of Pompeii (1830–1833)

The ancient Roman city of Pompeii has been frequently featured in literature and popular culture since its modern rediscovery. Pompeii was buried under 4 to 6 m (13 to 20 ft) of volcanic ash and pumice in the eruption of Mount Vesuvius in AD 79.

== Books and other printed works ==
Pompeii served as the background for the historic novels The Last Days of Pompeii (1834) by Edward Bulwer-Lytton (since adapted for film and TV), Arria Marcella (1852) by Théophile Gautier, The Taras Report on Pompeii (1975) by Alan Lloyd. Pompeii also appears in Shadows in Bronze (1990) and other novels in the Marcus Didius Falco series.

- Book I of the Cambridge Latin Course teaches Latin while telling the story of a Pompeii resident, Lucius Caecilius Iucundus, from the reign of Nero to that of Vespasian. The book ends when Mount Vesuvius erupts, where Caecilius and his household are killed. The books have a cult following and students have been known to go to Pompeii just to track down Caecilius's house.
- Louis Untermeyer wrote the short story, "The Dog of Pompeii", which centered on a blind orphan boy and his dog during the last days before Vesuvius erupted.
- A number of titles in The Roman Mysteries series of children's historical novels by Caroline Lawrence are set in Pompeii.
- In the fifth part of JoJo's Bizarre Adventure, Golden Wind, Giorno, Fugo, and Abbacchio are tasked to retrieve a key in the ruins of Pompeii which they find in the House of the Tragic Poet while fending off from an enemy Stand user.
- In book 13 of the Magic Tree House series by Mary Pope Osborne, Vacation under the Volcano, the protagonists go to Pompeii the day of the eruption.
- The bestseller novel Pompeii (2003) by Robert Harris tells the story of a (fictional) aquarius of the real life Aqua Augusta named Marcus Attilius. The story itself also features a Pliny the Younger reference to the Estate of Julia Felix, as well as also including the Piscina Mirabilis in Misenum, Pliny the Elder, and his nephew Gaius Pliny.
- The story of the manga NG Life (serialized from 2005 to 2009) revolves around a Japanese student who has apparently retained his memories of having been a gladiator in Pompeii, who lost his wife in the eruption of Mount Vesuvius.
- In Theresa Breslin's Dream Master: Gladiator (2011), Cy and the Dream Master travel back in time to the eve of the Mt. Vesuvius eruption.
- Book 2 of Gladiator School series Blood & Fire (2013) brothers Quintus and Lucius travel to Pompeii for a gladiator festival.
- In Daniel Godfrey's New Pompeii (Titan Books, 2016), the population of ancient Pompeii is transported through time to the present day and into a replica of their town.
- The Wolf Den Trilogy by Elodie Harper (Hachette 2021, 2022, 2023), takes place in Pompeii. The books include historical figures such as Pliny the Elder, Julia Felix, Emperor Titus and Berenice of Cilicia.

== Film ==
The Last Days of Pompeii (1908)

There have been several movies based on Edward Bulwer-Lytton's 1834 book, The Last Days of Pompeii:

- 1900 – The Last Days of Pompeii (UK), directed by Walter R. Booth.
- 1908 – The Last Days of Pompeii (Gli ultimi giorni di Pompei) (Italy), directed by Arturo Ambrosio and Luigi Maggi.
- 1913 – The Last Days of Pompeii (Gli ultimi giorni di Pompei) (Italy), directed by Mario Caserini.
- 1926 – The Last Days of Pompeii (Gli ultimi giorni di Pompei) (Italy), directed by Carmine Gallone.
- 1935 – The Last Days of Pompeii, an RKO film, with Preston Foster and Basil Rathbone, which carried a disclaimer that, although the scenes of Vesuvius erupting had been inspired by the novel, the movie did not use its plot or characters.
- 1950 – The Last Days of Pompeii (Gli ultimi giorni di Pompei / Les Derniers Jours de Pompéi) (Italy/France), directed by Marcel L'Herbier and Paolo Moffa.
- 1959 – The Last Days of Pompeii (Gli ultimi giorni di Pompei) (Italy), directed by Sergio Leone.

Productions using Pompeii as a story backdrop include:

- 1958 – Curse of the Faceless Man
- 1971 – Up Pompeii a comedy which followed the eponymous TV series (see below), culminating in the eruption of Mount Vesuvius.
- 2007 – Imperium: Pompeii – an Italian historical drama directed by Giulio Base (TV mini series, 180 min.)
- 2007 – Pompeii (TV series), directed by Paolo Poeti.
- 2014 – Pompeii a German-Canadian film set during the eruption of Mount Vesuvius.

Allusions to Pompeii

- Vesuvius is the name of the fictional glam metal band in the 2008 comedy The Rocker, which produces a hit song called "Pompeii Nights", depicting a glorified but grim version of the disaster.

== Games ==
- In the PC/Xbox 360 game Darkest of Days (2010), the player fights through the streets of Pompeii as the volcano is erupting, in an effort to save "The Father of Time".
- The storyline of a Macintosh and Windows computer game called TimeScape: Journey to Pompeii (2000), by DreamCatcher Interactive Inc., involves both time travel and ancient pagan gods.
- First level in the game Painkiller: Overdose is set in Pompeii as the volcano is erupting.
- In the PC game Imperator: Rome, an event occurs about the eruption of the volcano, causing heavily negative effects on Pompeii and nearby cities.
- In the story arc "The Lovers in the Pax Romana" from the iPhone/Android game "Magia Record", several Magical Girls from the 21st century travel to Pompeii to correct the timeline with the help of a Roman Magical Girl called Amaryllis.

== Music ==
=== Artists ===
- Pompeii is a post-rock band from Austin, Texas.
- "We Are Pompeii" is a band from Somerset, Kentucky.

=== Compositions ===
- In 1769, the composer Wolfgang Amadeus Mozart visited the Temple of Isis, which had been recently unearthed. His visit and the memories of the site inspired him 20 years later in his composition of The Magic Flute (1791).

=== Albums ===
- The St. Louis post-hardcore band Adair named their 2006 concept album, The Destruction of Everything is the Beginning of Something New, after the theme of Pompeii's demise. The album's lyrics often reference the idea of death and rebirth.

=== Songs ===
- In 1988 Heavy metal band Virgin Steele produced a song about the city called The Burning Of Rome (Cry For Pompeii) in their Album Age of Consent
- Giovanni Pacini's opera L'ultimo giorno di Pompei (1825) is noted for its special effects portraying the eruption of Vesuvius.
- E.S. Posthumus produced a musical track titled "Pompeii", which was used in the film Planet of the Apes (1968) and many others; it is included in the Unearthed album (2001).
- In October 1971, the band Pink Floyd performed at the vacant 2,000-year-old amphitheater in Pompeii, to an audience composed of film crew including camera operators. This performance, including some exterior shots of the ruins, was released as part of a movie entitled Pink Floyd: Live at Pompeii (1972). In 2017, band guitarist David Gilmour returned to perform a concert in the amphitheatre for about 3,000 people.
- Polish singer, songwriter, poet and author, Jacek Kaczmarski wrote two songs about Pompeii. The first, "Pompeja" (1978) depicts the last moments of Pompeii and later excavations of it, but allegorically also refers to Polish cities like Warsaw or Gdańsk, and talks about ignorance of warning signs and voices in times of crisis. Kaczmarski actually wrote this song before seeing Pompeii, which he visited a year later after winning a trip to Italy in the Students' Song Festival in Cracov in 1978 (or 1979?). The second song, "Pompeja Lupanar" (or just "Pompeja II") (1980), talks about live of various peoples in Pompeii before the Vesuvius eruption.
- The Siouxsie and The Banshees single "Cities in Dust" (1985) was inspired by the destruction of Pompeii.
- The Last Days of Pompeii (1991) is a rock opera by alternative rock band Nova Mob.
- The German progressive rock band Triumvirat produced a concept album, "Pompeii" (1977), telling the story of both the 62 and 79 AD eruptions of Vesuvius.
- "American Pompeii" is the eighth track on the Anthrax album Stomp 442 (1995).
- "This Was Pompeii" is the name of a song by Dar Williams about the city, on the album Mortal City (1997).
- "Pompeii" is also the title of a song by indie-rock trio Sleater-Kinney off of their fifth album, All Hands on the Bad One (2000).
- The Mars Volta band mentions the city of Pompeii in the song, "Cicatriz Esp" from the album Deloused in the Comatorium (2003).
- "Pompeii" is a song by Seattle-based progressive rock band Gatsbys American Dream. It is the second track of Volcano (2005), and is based loosely around the story of Pompeii.
- "Pompeii am Götterdämmerung" is a song by the band The Flaming Lips on their album At War with the Mystics (2006). The song narrates the tale of a couple who, in reaction to their families' rejection of their love, commit suicide together by simultaneously jumping into a volcano.
- Frank Ticheli composed a song entitled "Vesuvius" (2007), which depicts the last days of Pompeii.
- The Decemberists' song "Cocoon", on the album Castaways and Cutouts (2009), is about the victims of Vesuvius who were encased in volcanic ash.
- Gordon Downie, the lead singer of the Canadian band The Tragically Hip, refers to a dying family member as "the rock-plug for all of us" and says, "in the conduit of Vesuvius you were far more unifying than you know" in the song "Toronto #4" (2010).
- Screamworks: Love in Theory and Practice (2010), the seventh studio album by the Finnish rock band HIM, features a song entitled "Like St. Valentine" in which one line reads: "Like the couple from Pompeii, our drama's put on display".
- The British band Bastille released a single named "Pompeii" (2013) with lyrics that reference the destruction of the city. It reached number two on the UK Singles Chart.
- Robbie Williams mentions Pompeii in the first lines of the song “Wedding Bells” from the album Swings Both Ways. (2013)

== TV ==
Pompeii is featured in many television biographies and documentaries. It is also featured in ABC's television series called Roman Mysteries.

=== Entertainment ===
- Pompeii was supposedly fueled with supernatural energy. The paranormal reality TV show Destination Truth feature this historic land to prove a paranormal presence roams the ancient city.

=== Fiction ===
- It was the setting for the British comedy television series Up Pompeii!, the 1971 movie of the series Up Pompeii, and its two one-off specials Further Up Pompeii! (1975) and Further Up Pompeii (1991). Only in the movie does Mount Vesuvius actually erupt.
- The Last Days of Pompeii (Italy/UK/US) is a television miniseries from 1984 based on Edward Bulwer-Lytton's book The Last Days of Pompeii.
- In The Simpsons episode "The Italian Bob" the family visits the remnants of Pompeii where Lisa refers to the numerous victims whose bodies were preserved by the ash in the position they were in the moment they died. One group of plaster cast victims include a family exactly resembling the Simpsons with a Homer look-alike strangling a Bart look-alike. The couch gag from "Homer and Lisa Exchange Cross Words" is also a reference to Pompeii.
- Pompeii featured in the second episode of the fourth series of revived BBC drama series Doctor Who, named "The Fires of Pompeii", where it transpires that the Tenth Doctor and Donna Noble caused the eruption in order to prevent the Earth from being taken over by an alien race known as the Pyroviles.
- "The Fires of Vulcan" – Doctor Who audio drama in the city just before the eruption with the Seventh Doctor.
- Within the universe of the Highlander franchise, immortals are not allowed to take heads on holy ground. According to the character Joe Dawson in the episode Little Tin God, there is a story that tells of how two immortals engaged on holy ground resulted in the eruption of Mount Vesuvius.
- In the television series Forever Knight, vampire Lucien Lacroix was a Roman general who returns home to Pompeii to find his daughter Divia has become a vampire. He is turned into a vampire by his daughter during the fall of Pompeii.
- Apocalypse Pompeii (2014) TV film – Mount Vesuvius erupts when a family visits Pompeii. A Former Special Ops commando visits the ancient city on business with his wife and daughter and become trapped as Mt. Vesuvius erupts with massive force. While his family fights to survive the deadly onslaught of heat and lava, he enlists his former teammates in a daring operation beneath the ruins of Pompeii.
- Pompeii's destruction is depicted in the Disney+ series Loki, set in the Marvel Cinematic Universe. In the episode "The Variant", an alternative version of the character Loki warns the people of Pompeii about Mount Vesuvius' coming eruption. The villagers at first dismiss his warnings until the eruption starts, while Agent Mobius notices that Loki's actions did not affect the timeline.
- It was the setting for the Japanese anime T・P BON on Netflix. In the episode The Wrath of the Gods, it was the eruption of Mount Vesuvius during the battle of Lazarus on Amphitheatre of Pompeii in 79 AD.

=== Documentaries ===
- Ancient Mysteries: Pompeii: Buried Alive (1996), an A&E television documentary narrated by Leonard Nimoy.
- In the Shadow of Vesuvius (1997), a National Geographic special that explores the sites of Pompeii and Herculaneum, interviews archaeologists, and examines the events leading up to the eruption of Vesuvius.
- Pompeii: The Last Day (2003), an hour-long drama produced for the BBC that portrays several characters (with historically attested names, but fictional life-stories) living in Pompeii, Herculaneum and around the Bay of Naples, and their last hours, including a fuller and his wife, two gladiators, and Pliny the Elder. It also portrays the facts of the eruption. It is heavily influenced by Edward Bulwer-Lytton's book The Last Days of Pompeii (see Pompeii in popular culture#Books and other printed works), which – while being responsible for the popularization of Pompeii in Western culture – has been dismissed for its lack of historical credibility. To give some historical reality to the characters, the death throes of the characters portrayed are based on actual skeletons and bodies found during excavations in the 18th century, while Pliny the Elder's death is shown as based on the accounts of how he actually died. Although in the story the narrator uses reports that Pliny the Elder died from inhaling the fumes of the final and greatest pyroclastic surge, as many reports have found, he most likely had suffered a heart attack or stroke.
- Pompeii and the 79 AD eruption (2004), a 120-minute Tokyo Broadcasting System.
- Pompeii Live (June 28, 2006), a Channel 5 production featuring a live archaeological dig at Pompeii and Herculaneum
- Pompeii: The Mystery of the People Frozen in Time (2013), a BBC One drama documentary presented by Dr. Margaret Mountford.
- Pompeii: Out of Time (2026), a three part drama documentary presented by Tom Hiddleston.

== Visual art ==
=== Art exhibitions ===
- The Birmingham Museum of Art hosted "Pompeii: Tales from an Eruption" from October 2007 to January 2008. The show was earlier on exhibit in the Field Museum of Natural History in Chicago, and after Birmingham moved on to the Museum of Fine Arts in Houston.
- The Discovery Place museum in Charlotte, North Carolina held an exhibit of "A Day in Pompeii".
- The Naples National Archaeological Museum from October 2007 to March 2008 held an exhibition called "Alma Tadema e la nostalgia dell'antico" or "Alma Tadema and the longing for the antique", showing how Lawrence Alma-Tadema and other painters represented the ruins of Pompeii in their pictures. A book of this exhibition has also been published.

=== Artworks ===
- John Martin's The Destruction of Pompeii and Herculaneum (1822)
- Karl Brullov's The Last Day of Pompeii (1830–33)
- Carel Willink's Late Visitors to Pompeii (1931)

== Other uses ==
- The theme park Busch Gardens Williamsburg features an attraction entitled "Escape from Pompeii", which carries riders through the city as flaming ruins topple around them, ending in a 50-foot plunge.
