= Pompeya =

Pompeya may refer to:

- Pompeii, a Roman town near Naples, Italy
- Pompeya (band), a Russian band
- Nueva Pompeya, a neighborhood of Buenos Aires, Argentina
