= Columbaria of Vigna Codini =

Roman burial chambers

Three extensive underground collective burial columbaria were discovered at Vigna Codini in the mid-nineteenth century, near the Aurelian Walls between the via Appia and via Latina in Rome, Italy. Although this area on the outskirts of Rome was traditionally used for elite burials, these columbaria that emerged in the Augustan era seem to have been reserved for non-aristocratic individuals, including former slaves. Not to be confused with the later phenomenon of catacomb inhumations, these subterranean chambers contained niches for cremation urns. The columbaria at Vigna Codini are among some of the largest in Rome.

== Origins and social context of columbaria in Rome ==
The term columbarium, meaning “dovecote,” reflects the nesting of a pair of urns in a burial niche, and it is by the presence of these subterranean cremation urns that columbaria are most commonly identified. Columbaria are unique for a variety of reasons, including their location, collective nature, and relatively short lifespan.

The columbaria at Vigna Codini are located along the Via Appia, which was the traditional placement of the monumental tombs of elite Republican families. Whereas these aristocratic burials were prominently displayed along the street, the nearby non-elite columbaria that arose in the Augustan period were almost entirely subterranean and therefore hidden from public view as people exited Rome.

This Augustan context (late 1st c. BCE - early 1st c. CE) is critical to understanding the columbaria because the first emperor transformed the urban and social fabric of Rome. This period encouraged experimentation with new and foreign architectural forms, and it has been suggested that the "dovecote" model resembles Hellenistic examples, just as the Mausoleum of Augustus may have looked to Hellenistic tumulus precedents. The prolific incorporation of inscriptions in the columbaria have also been suggested to emulate Augustan epigraphic culture, such as in the Res Gestae Divi Augusti.

Numerous imperial family members were also buried in the Mausoleum following Augustus, which may have influenced the inclusive organization of the columbaria as well. The burials and epitaphs of slaves, freedmen, and other occupational group members in these columbaria are especially important, since we have so few written records about non-elite Romans. Furthermore, the equally-spaced rows and niches of the columbaria indicate an emphasis on egalitarian social status among the interred individuals. For the most part, columbaria in Rome were only in use until the early - mid-2nd century CE, when inhumations became the standard over cremation.

== Columbarium 1 ==
=== Discovery and dimensions ===
G.P. Campana uncovered the first columbarium in 1840, and it is the largest of the Vigna Codini columbaria. Filippo Coarelli estimates the columbarium to be 5.08 x 7.06-7.42 meters, while Dorian Borbonus records its dimensions as 5.65 x 7.50 meters based on Campana's 1840 notes. Dating for this columbarium is not exact, but it appears to be Late Augustan to Late Tiberian (early - mid-1st century CE), based on inscriptions and painted decoration. One of the funerary epitaphs has yielded a terminus ante quem of 10 CE, which is in line with the date for Columbarium 2 at Vigna Codini.

This rectangular burial chamber is constructed of brick, with an opus reticulatum podium on three sides. The podium does not cross the eastern wall, where instead a small staircase resting on two arches is located. The niches along this wall would have been the first ones visitors would see upon entrance to the columbarium. The floor measures approximately 6 meters below the surface, and ceiling would have been supported by a large central pilaster. This pier would likely have served to support four barrel vaults, in order to give access to the upper rows of niches. The central structure itself would have also provided additional niche space. The narrow edges of this pilaster contain four frieze panels decorated with Dionysian imagery.

=== Design and inscriptions ===
In addition to the pilaster niches, arched niches line all of the walls, with space for an estimated total of nearly 500 burials. With approximately two urns per niche, the columbarium could hold about 900 cremated individuals in total. For the most part, these niches and urns were similar in shape, size, and decoration, and their arrangement into evenly spaced rows creates a relatively egalitarian burial model. The columbarium also contains anywhere from 200–300 painted, incised, or marble inscriptions intended to name the deceased. Inscriptions demarcate approximately two out of every three niches along the lower rows of the north, south, and west walls, but those numbers decrease significantly among the upper rows.

Borbonus states that the correlation between row to number of inscriptions is likely not attributed to the preservation quality of the higher rows, and that the inscribed niches are primarily confined to the lower sections where they would have been easily viewed among visitors. Although there may have been some correlation with accessibility and columbarium social hierarchy at play, the primary evidence for social distinction in Columbarium 1 takes the form of modified niches. In a context where architectural design only allowed for uniform semicircular niches, modifications to these niches enabled space for object depositions and adornments. The epigraphic evidence refers to individuals from numerous families, including some slaves and freedmen, although no particular family seems to dominate the record. Rather, anyone who could pay, could be buried in Columbarium 1.

== Columbarium 2 ==
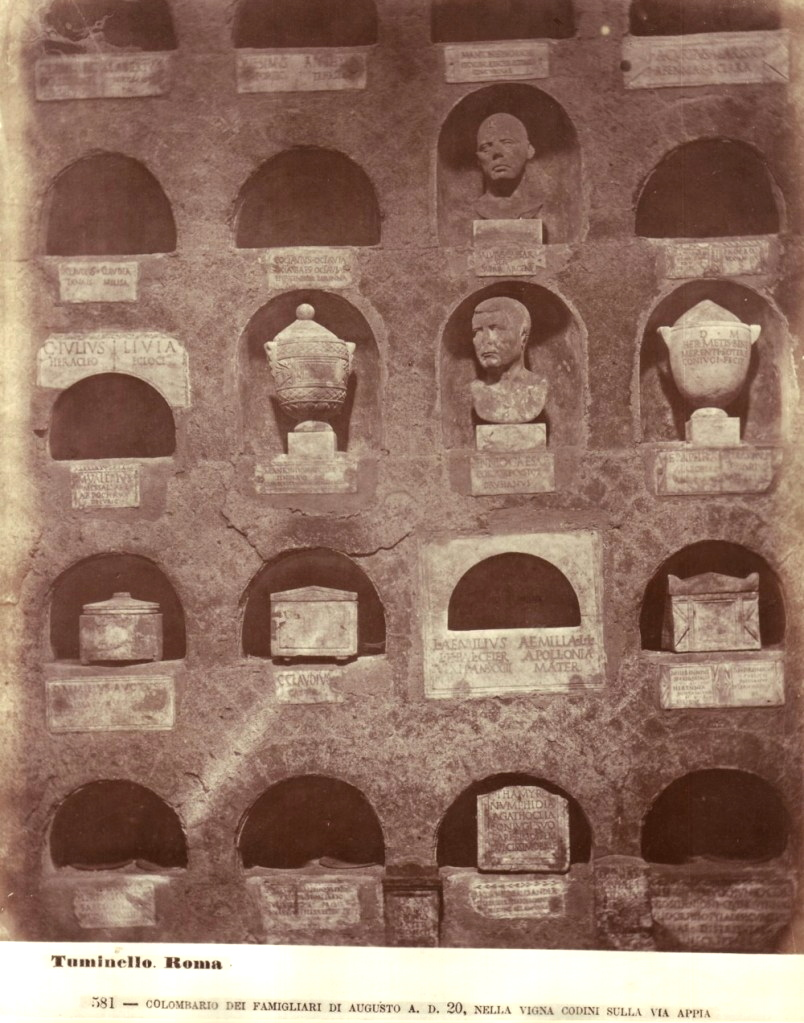
Photograph of Columbarium 2 at Vigna Codini by Lodovico Tuminello (1824-1907)

=== Discovery and dimensions ===
In 1847, the second columbarium was found. Coarelli attributes the discovery to Campana; Borbonus attributes it to Pietro Codini. This columbarium is similar in plan and construction to the first, with a floor about 7 meters below the surface and nearly square in shape at 5.90 x 5.20 meters. The mosaic floor includes an inscription that indicates a terminus ante quem of 10 CE, just as with Columbarium 1.

The opus reticulatum walls each contain nine rows of semicircular niches meant to hold two cinerary urns each. The ninth row is only preserved on one wall, with an additional wall having been restored to that level. Coarelli speculates that Columbarium 2 could have held over 300 burials, whereas Borbonus raises that number to 690. Here, too, a podium wraps around the walls, stopping at the west wall where the entry stairs are located.

=== Design and inscriptions ===
Two walls contain extensive paint work, including colored stucco and pediments for niches, floral imagery, and depictions of musical instruments. Some sculptural busts bearing Augustan-era stylistic features have been uncovered. There are also remnants of later Neronian and possibly Flavian portraits that were added well after the columbarium's Augustan construction.

Historically, this columbarium has been attributed as the Monumentum Familiae Marcellae, and while Borbonus maintains this identification, Coarelli dismisses it. The burials appear to be a mixed variety including slaves, freedmen, and musicians connected to the imperial family. There is greater emphasis on work occupation in Columbarium 2 than in 1, and individuals are distinguished by marble plaques that either appear to be original and inscribed as needed, or later restorations.

== Columbarium 3 ==
=== Discovery and dimensions ===
Pietro Codini uncovered the complex's third columbarium on his property in 1852. Unlike the previous two columbaria, this one consists of three linked corridors around a small garden, forming a U-shape. Despite its unique plan and remarkable wealth, Columbarium 3 is the least well-known of the three at Vigna Codini. Borbonus describes the dimensions with respect to the “step” length of the three corridors: 16, 23, and 18, respectively. This columbarium dates to the post-Augustan period; Borbonus lists it as Julio-Claudian, though probably Augustan-Tiberian, and Coarelli dates it to the second century CE on the basis of Claudian, Flavian, and Antonine freedmen.

Like the other columbaria, this one employs opus reticulatum. Visitors would have entered via two flights of stairs. Pilasters support vaults presumably for access to higher niches. The walls were lined with seven rows of rectangular niches, and each niche could hold four urns. This organization makes Columbarium 3 the largest of the Vigna Codini structures, with a capacity of about 950 individuals.

=== Design and inscriptions ===
Columbarium 3 is notable for its size as well as its immense wealth and decoration. Both the vaults and walls are painted with first century CE stylistic floral and faunal motifs, including birds, dolphins, and lions, although these paintings are later than the original construction. The walls were also adorned with marble. Many fine-quality marble urns, as well as a later sarcophagus, have been recovered from the chamber.

However, given the amount of niches and urns, the amount of epigraphic evidence lacks in comparison. Of the ca. 150 name plates that exist, many belong to freedmen and slaves connected to the imperial family, as well as traders, tax collectors, and tent makers. According to Carmelo Calci, the inscriptions also reveal this columbarium remained in use until the Hadrianic period (early to mid-2nd c. CE) but initially belonged to the former slaves of the Julio-Claudians. Although there is some evidence for embellishment of niches, such as that of Iulius Chrysantus, unlike a four-sided columbarium, where visitors can see most of the niches at any given time, the U-shape of Columbarium 3 disables modified burials from standing out as prominently overall.
