= Rotterdamse Kunstkring =

Arts organization

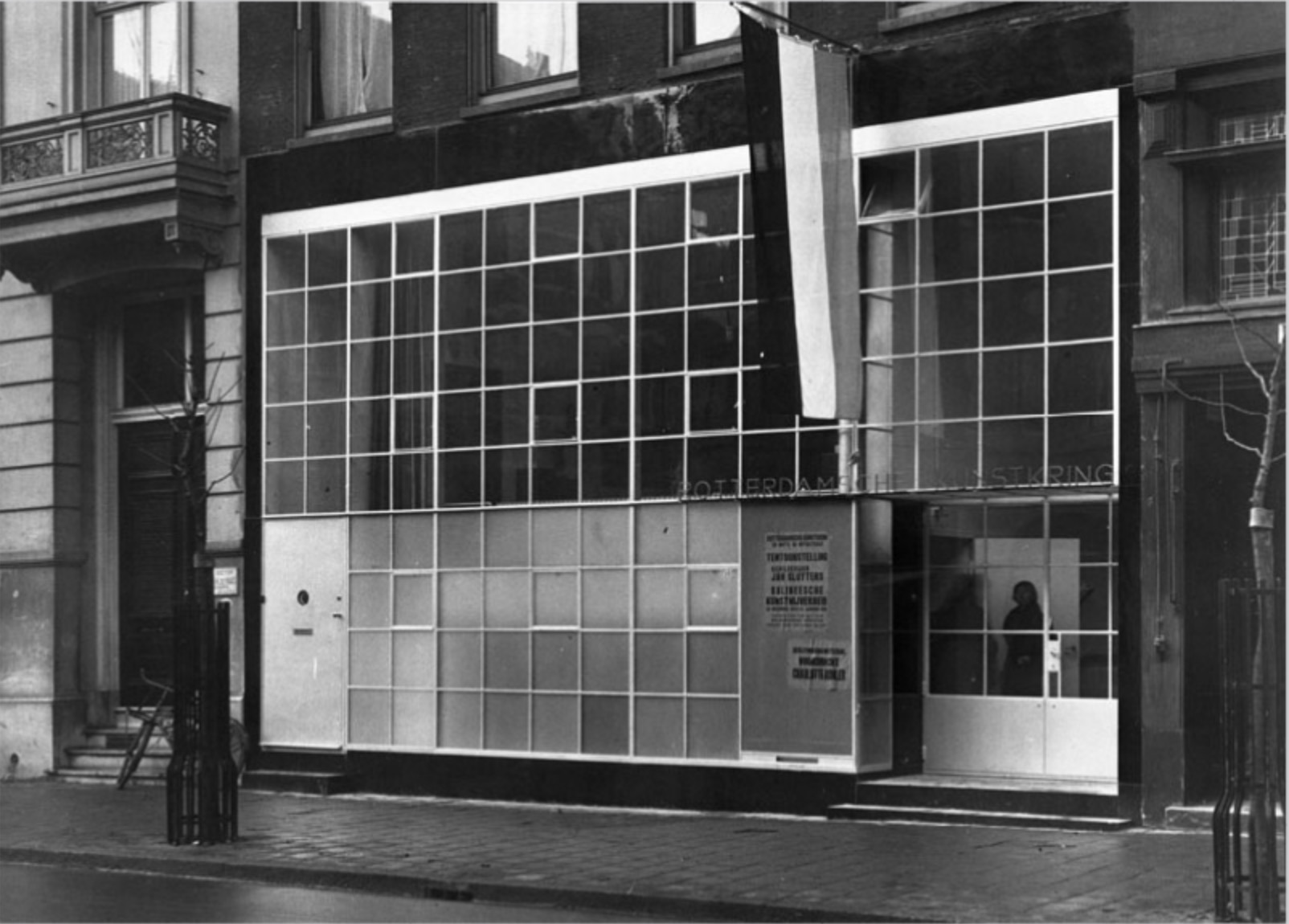
Building of the Rotterdamsche Kunstkring in 1933

The Rotterdamsche Kunstkring (RKK) was an association in the Dutch city of Rotterdam, for and by artists and art lovers. Its members included visual artists, architects, writers, recitalists, photographers, musicians and designers.

Following the example of the Haagse Kunstkring, the association was founded in 1893 by Jean Browne, Henry Haverkorn van Rijsewijk, Pieter Cornelis de Moor, Frans Netscher, Willem Royaards, Jan Cornelis de Vos, and Derk Wiggers. The Kunstkring settled in Hotel du Passage on Korte Hoogstraat and moved to 35 Witte de Withstraat in 1899. The Kunstkring organized various exhibitions, both group exhibitions on specific themes and solo exhibitions by specific artists. Their debut exhibition was about Jacob and Willem Maris, followed shortly after by an exhibition about Jozef Israëls.

The building on Witte de Withstraat survived the bombing of Rotterdam and would be sold to the municipality of Rotterdam in 1962. During the reconstruction, entrepreneur and art lover Ludo Pieters became closely involved with the Kunstkring. First as a board member (1953) and from 1955 as chairman, he remained at the Kunstkring until the association was dissolved in 1969.
