= Pompey (dog) =

Dog owned by William the Silent

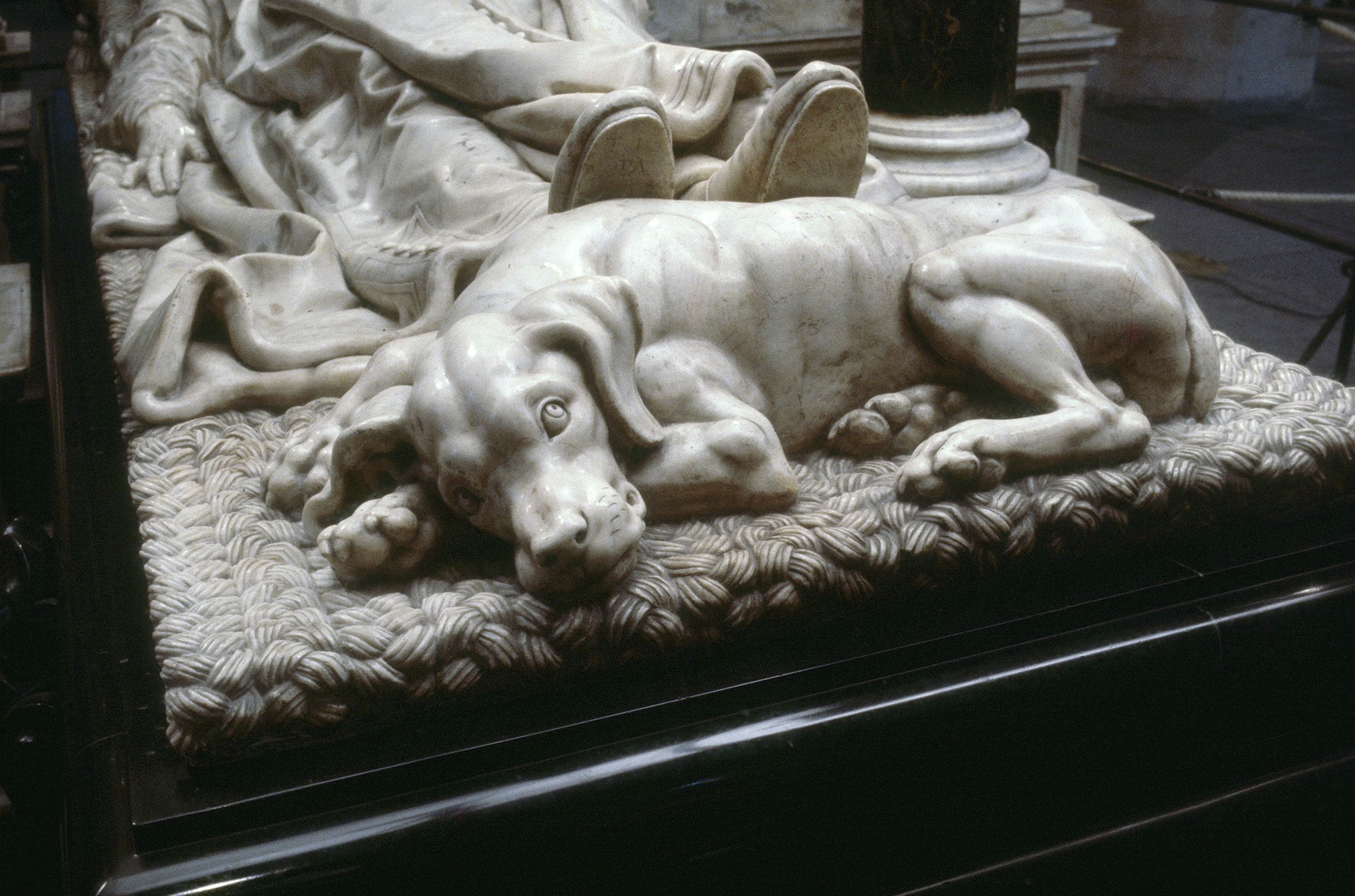
A sculpture of Pompey at the Church of St. Ursula in Delft

Pompey was the dog of William the Silent, the Prince of Orange. During a campaign against the Spanish, Pompey thwarted an assassination attempt. One night at Hermigny, France, while the prince slept, assassins crept toward his tent. The dog had heard them and began barking and scratching to warn his master, finally jumping on his master's face to alert him to the impending danger.

On the monument of William the Silent, at the Church of St. Ursula in Delft, Pompey is carved lying at his master's feet.

There have been differing views on the breed of the dog in this legend. Some refer to the dog as a relative of the pug, yet others believe Pompey was a Kooikerhondje. The dog was referred to as a "spaniel" by a U.S. court.

Hendrick de Keyser's terracotta model for the mortuary statue of William I, Prince of Orange with Pompey is in the collection of the Rijksmuseum.

== See also ==
- List of individual dogs
