= The Last Days of Pompeii (disambiguation) =

The Last Days of Pompeii is an 1834 novel by Edward Bulwer-Lytton.

The Last Days of Pompeii may also refer to:

== Films ==
- The Last Days of Pompeii (1908 film), an Italian film by Arturo Ambrosio
- The Last Days of Pompeii (1913 film), an Italian silent film by Caserini and Rodolfi
- Jone or the Last Days of Pompeii, a 1913 Italian silent film by Del Colle and Vidali
- The Last Days of Pompeii (1926 film), an Italian silent film by Carmine Gallone and Amleto Palermi
- The Last Days of Pompeii (1935 film), a film starring Preston Foster, David Holt, and Basil Rathbone
- The Last Days of Pompeii (1950 film), a French-Italian film by Marcel L'Herbier and Paolo Moffa
- The Last Days of Pompeii (1959 film), an Italian film by Sergio Leone, credited to Mario Bonnard
- The Last Days of Pompeii (miniseries), a 1984 U.S. miniseries

== Other uses ==
- L'ultimo giorno di Pompei (The Last Day of Pompeii), an 1825 opera by Giovanni Pacini
- The Last Day of Pompeii, an 1833 painting by Karl Briullov
- The Last Days of Pompeii (album), a 1991 album by Nova Mob

== See also ==
- Herculaneum
- Mount Vesuvius
- Pliny the Elder
- Pliny the Younger
- Pompeii
- Pompeii: The Last Day, a 2003 docudrama
