= The Last Days of Pompeii (1926 film) =

1926 Italian film

The Last Days of Pompei
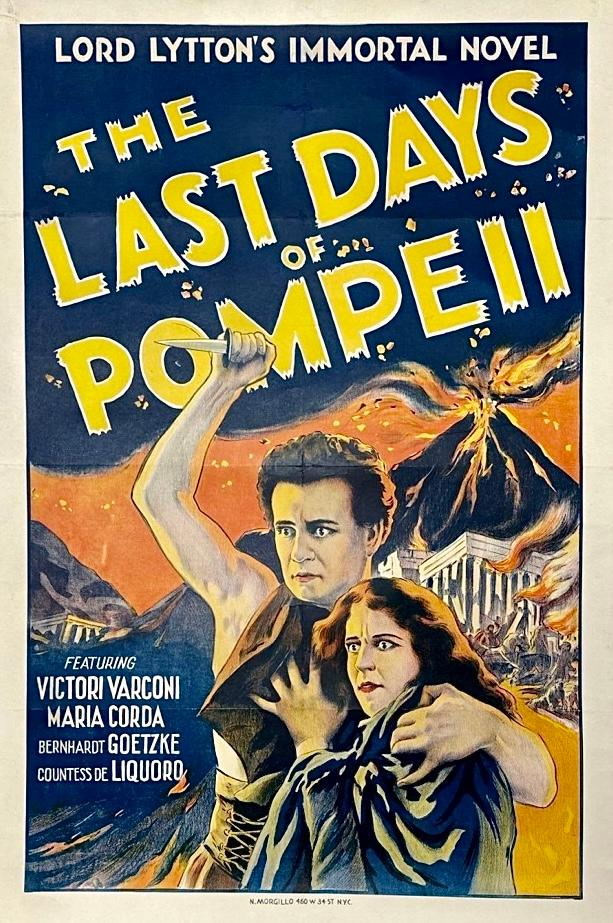
- Poster to US theatrical release of The Last Days of Pompeii
- Directed by: Carmine Gallone; Amleto Palermi
- Written by: Alfredo Panzini (titles)
- Based on: The Last Days of Pompeii; 1834 novel by Edward Bulwer-Lytton
- Starring: Victor Varconi
- Cinematography: Alfredo Donelli
- Color process: Pathechrome
- Distributed by: Società Italiana Grandi Films
- Release date: 9 March 1926
- Running time: 181 minutes
- Country: Italy
- Languages: silent Italian intertitles

The Last Days of Pompeii (Italian: Gli ultimi giorni di Pompei) is a 1926 Italian historical silent epic film. The last of the great silent Italian epics, the film was lavishly produced and ran for more than three hours. It was an unexpected financial disaster following a string of films by the same title that were highly successful.

== Plot summary ==
The film and its predecessors were based on Edward Bulwer-Lytton's 1834 novel The Last Days of Pompeii. The following summary is based on a version from the Harvard Film Archive. Glaucus, a young man, falls in love with Ione. Arbaces, an Egyptian priest, also loves her. He tries to convert Ione's brother Apaecides to his religion, and when that fails he kills him. He then tries to pin the murder on Nydia, Glaucus's enslaved servant woman who is also blind. The drama is interrupted by the eruption of Mount Vesuvius, which kills the evil Arbaces. As the city collapses, Nydia guides Ione and Glaucus safely out of the city.

== Production ==
The movie was directed by Carmine Gallone and Amleto Palermi, and its intertitles were written by Luigi Pirandello, Silvio d'Amico, and Alfredo Panzini. Original release prints of the film were entirely colorized by the Pathechrome stencil color process. With 4,240 takes, hundreds of extras, and lavish sets depicting realistic interiors, façades, costumes, and street scenes, it was one of the greatest productions of its time. All the scenery and costumes were based on archaeological evidence and 19th-century paintings.

== Reception ==
=== Box office ===
The Last Days of Pompeii was the third Italian movie of the same title, beginning with a 1908 version by Arturo Ambrosio (producer) and Luigi Maggi (director). While previous adaptations of Bulwer-Lytton's novels had been worldwide successes, starting a trend for epic historical films, the 1926 film was a major commercial and financial failure. Unable to compete with the faster-paced style of contemporary American cinema, it spelled the end for the Italian epic genre of the silent era. It contributed to the broader collapse of the Unione Cinematografica Italiana (a major Italian film consortium) which went bankrupt in 1926.

Despite its failure, the 1926 version was praised for its innovative special effects and Pathéchrome colouring process. The film performed better in Europe than in the USA, and it was a major box-office hit in France. According to the 1 December 1926 issue of the French film periodical Cinéa-Ciné pour tous, the film grossed more money at the Aubert Palace in Paris during the week of 12–18 November 1926 than any other film had since its opening.

=== Critical reaction ===
Sylvie Magerstädt analyzes the 1926 version as a surprise stumble after a string of hits: "Two more film versions followed in 1913, Gli ultimi giorni di Pompei and Jone ovvero gli ultimi giorni di Pompei, before Carmine Gallone and Amleto Pelermi’s 1926 attempt put a temporary stop to the genre." Jon Solomon says it "was spectacular in more than the long-running, multi-extra, history-sweeping cinematic sense. It was a spectacular financial disaster as well, and it can fairly be blamed for the demise of “ancient” film in Italy."

== Legacy ==
In the mid-1990s, the Centro Sperimentale di Cinematografia and the Cineteca Nazionale realized a tinted restoration print of the movie using photochemical processes. The premiere screening of the restoration print was held in the amphitheatre of Pompeii, followed by a screening at the major restoration festival, 'Il Cinema Ritrovato', in Bologna in 1998. In September 23, 2012 a rare print of the movie borrowed from the British Film Institute was screened at the Harvard Film Archive.

== Cast ==
- Victor Varconi as Glauco
- Rina De Liguoro as Ione
- María Corda as Nydia, the blind flower seller
- Bernhard Goetzke as Arbace
- Emilio Ghione as Caleno
- Lia Maris as Julia
- Gildo Bocci as Diomede
- Enrica Fantis as Julia's friend
- Vittorio Evangelisti as Apecide
- Ferruccio Biancini as Olinto
- Carlo Gualandri as Clodio
- Vasco Creti as Sallustius
- Alfredo Martinelli as Lepidus
- Giuseppe Pierozzi as Josio
- Enrico Monti as Lidone
- Enrico Palermi as Medone
- Carlo Reiter as Pansa
- Carlo Duse as Burbo

== See also ==
- List of early color feature films

== Bibliography ==
- Marlow-Mann, Alexander (2000). "Gli ultimi giorni di Pompei, or the Evolution of the Italian Historical Epic (1908-1926)". La Valle dell'Eden. Quadrimestrale di cinema e audiovisivi. 2 (6): 67–78.
- Bertellini, Giorgio (2002). "Re-Viewing Fascism: Italian Cinema 1922–1943". In Jacqueline Reich; Piero Garofalo (eds.). La Valle dell'Eden. Quadrimestrale di cinema e audiovisivi. Bloomington: Indiana University Press. pp. 30–82. ISBN 978-0253109149.
- Ireland, Corydon (25 September 2012). "Visions of doom". The Harvard Gazette.
