= Luigi Maggi =

Italian actor and film director

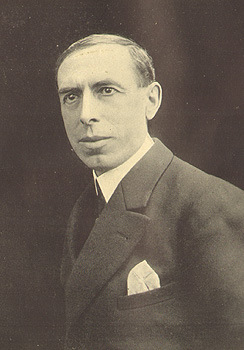
- Born: 21 December 1867; Turin, Piedmont, Italy
- Died: 22 August 1946 (aged 78); Turin, Piedmont, Italy
- Occupations: Actor, director
- Years active: 1906–1928
- Notable work: The Last Days of Pompeii; Nero

Luigi Maggi (21 December 1867 – 22 August 1946) was an Italian actor and film director who worked prolifically during the silent era. Working for Ambrosio Film he co-directed the 1908 hit film The Last Days of Pompeii, which launched the historical epic as a popular Italian genre.

== Biography ==
=== Early life and career ===
Luigi Maggi was born in Turin on 21 December 1867 to Annibale Maggi, a professional engraver, and Rosa Giaccone. He started his career as a typographer at the publishing house Unione Tipografico-Editrice Torinese (UTET). In 1906, he met Arturo Ambrosio, the owner of a well-established photography shop and a passionate amateur filmmaker. Ambrosio had decided to devote himself to film production, financing a series of short movies spanning various genres. To this end, he hired Maggi for a salary of 100 lire a month. Maggi's role was to select subjects with the producer, film them and occasionally act in them.

Maggi made his first screen appearance in Romanzo di un derelitto (The Story of a Derelict), directed by Roberto Omegna, in 1906. That same year, he made his directorial debut with several short films, including Vendetta alsaziana (Alsatian Revenge), Dramma in caserma (Drama in the Barracks), L'ultima sera di Carnevale (The Last Evening of Carnival) and Il telefono del Medioevo (The Telephone of the Middle Ages).

=== The Last Days of Pompeii ===
From 1907 onwards, Italian film studios experienced a significant leap forward in the quantity and quality of their productions. Within a year, Maggi became the first director at Ambrosio Film, who entrusted him with the ambitious project of directing a movie based on Edward Bulwer-Lytton's famous novel, The Last Days of Pompeii.

The film premiered in 1908. Starring Lydia De Roberti and Maggi himself as Arbace, it was structured in 14 scenes with dramatic, tableau-style shots. The elaborate, beautiful and realistic sets were advanced for their time, setting the film apart from other contemporary productions. Of particular note was the depiction of the eruption of Mount Vesuvius, which used special effects such as smoke and debris to create a spectacular scene. With its beautiful sets and spectacular, innovative visual effects, the film was a significant commercial and critical success, and is widely regarded as the precursor to the historical epic genre that would bring Italian cinema international fame.

=== Mature works ===
In 1908, Maggi directed the film-ballet The Count of Monte Cristo, the comedy The Flowers of St. Anthony, and The Calvary of a Master. Building on the success of The Last Days of Pompeii, in 1909, he directed more than ten films, several of which received considerable acclaim: Spergiura! (starring Mary Cléo Tarlarini and Maggi himself), Galileo Galilei (starring Lydia De Roberti), Il figlio delle selve (starring Alberto Capozzi), Amore e patria, and Luigi XI re di Francia (also starring Maggi). However, the biggest success of the year was Nero, based on the eponymous 1872 drama by Pietro Cossa. The film was particularly successful overseas, with 300 copies distributed worldwide, and it received glowing reviews in the influential magazine The Moving Picture World. Particularly stunning were the movie's visual effects, such as the red toning in the scene depicting the burning of Rome.

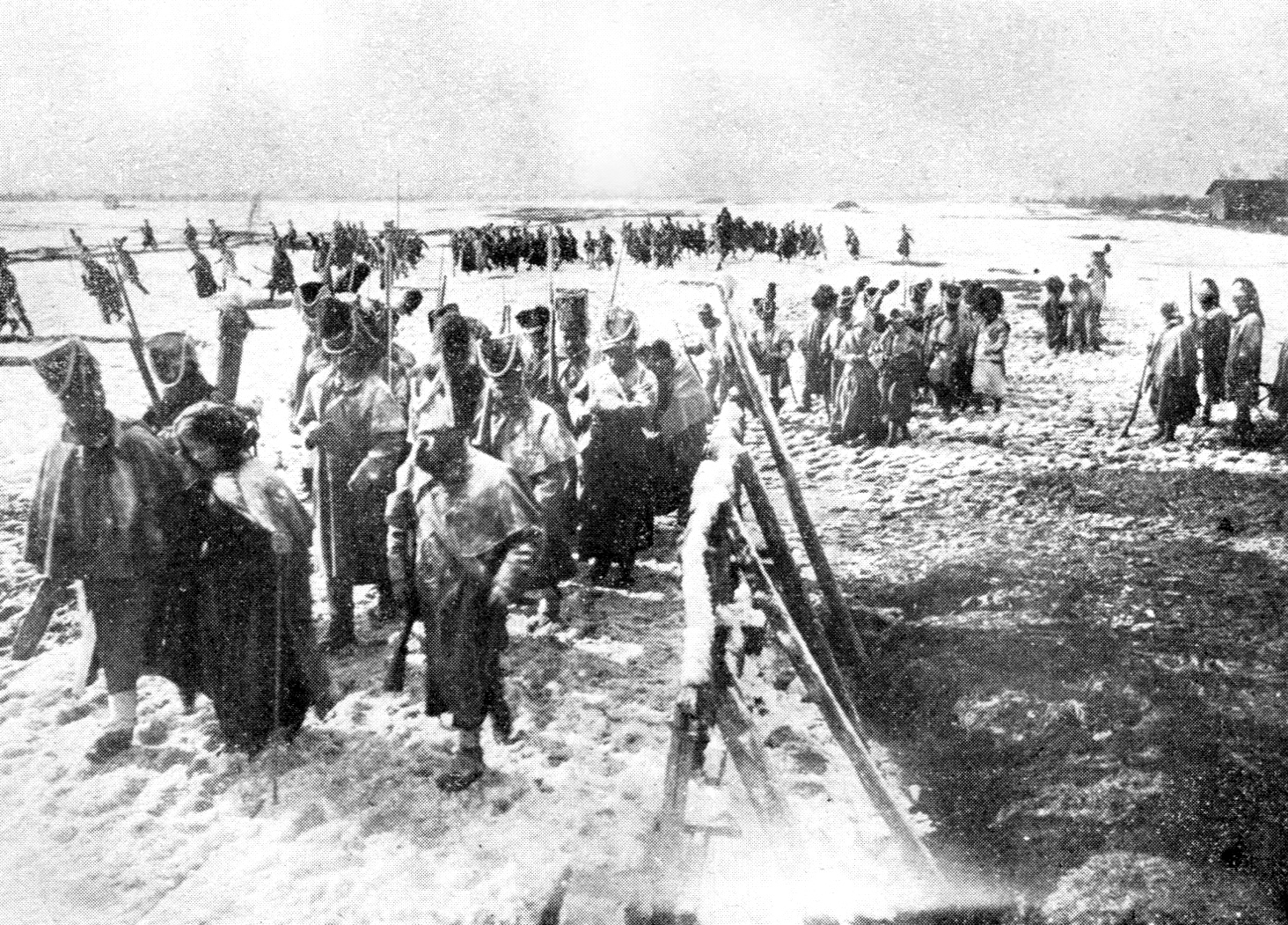
Scene from Maggi's film Grenadier Roland, shot in the Alps by Giovanni Vitrotti

In 1911, Maggi directed two of his greatest successes. The first was Grenadier Roland, starring Alberto Capozzi and Mary Cleo Tarlarini and based on a story by Arrigo Frusta. Set during the French invasion of Russia, the film was shot in the Alps by Giovanni Vitrotti, one of the leading cinematographers of the time. Even more notable was the success of Nozze d'oro (The Golden Wedding), which is widely regarded as Maggi's finest work. Also based on a story by Frusta, the film is set during the Second Italian War of Independence and depicts the 1859 Franco-Italian assault on Palestro against the Austrians. The film, in which Maggi once again appeared as an actor, represented a significant creative breakthrough in cinematic narrative due to the use of a series of flashbacks that take the protagonist back in time. Nozze d'oro was hailed as a masterpiece in Italy and abroad, and was awarded first prize in the artistic film section of the Turin International. Shortly thereafter, however, the film was banned in Italy by the Giolitti government to avoid provoking protests from the Austrian government. This censorship provoked outrage among many intellectuals, and the film continued to be distributed and perform well abroad.

In 1911, Maggi appeared as an actor in two films: La figlia di Jorio, directed by Edoardo Bencivenga, and L'ultimo dei Frontignac, directed by Mario Caserini. He also directed several other films, including La tigre (starring the Alberto Capozzi and Mary Cleo Tarlarini) and Sogno di un tramonto d'autunno, which was based on the eponymous play by D'Annunzio.

In 1912, Maggi directed the film Satan, starring Mario Bonnard and Mary Cleo Tarlarini. Accompanied by texts written by the poet G. Volante, the film depicted the demonic presence in the world through three episodes. The first episode was inspired by John Milton's Paradise Lost and concerned Satan's revolt against God. The second episode was set in the Middle Ages and depicted the moral corruption of monks. The third episode was set in the modern era and showed the violence caused by greed. Maggi's Satan was arguably the first major anthology film in history and, according to some scholars, influenced D. W. Griffith's Intolerance (1916).

In the same year, Maggi directed The Bridge of Ghosts, The Ship of Lions and The Red Rose. In 1913, he attempted to replicate the success of Nozze d'oro with a second film set during the Risorgimento, La lampada della nonna (Grandmother's Lamp), which employed a similar flashback structure and was also a box office hit. He completed the Risorgimento trilogy that same year with La campana della morte (The Bell of Death).

=== World War I and later career ===
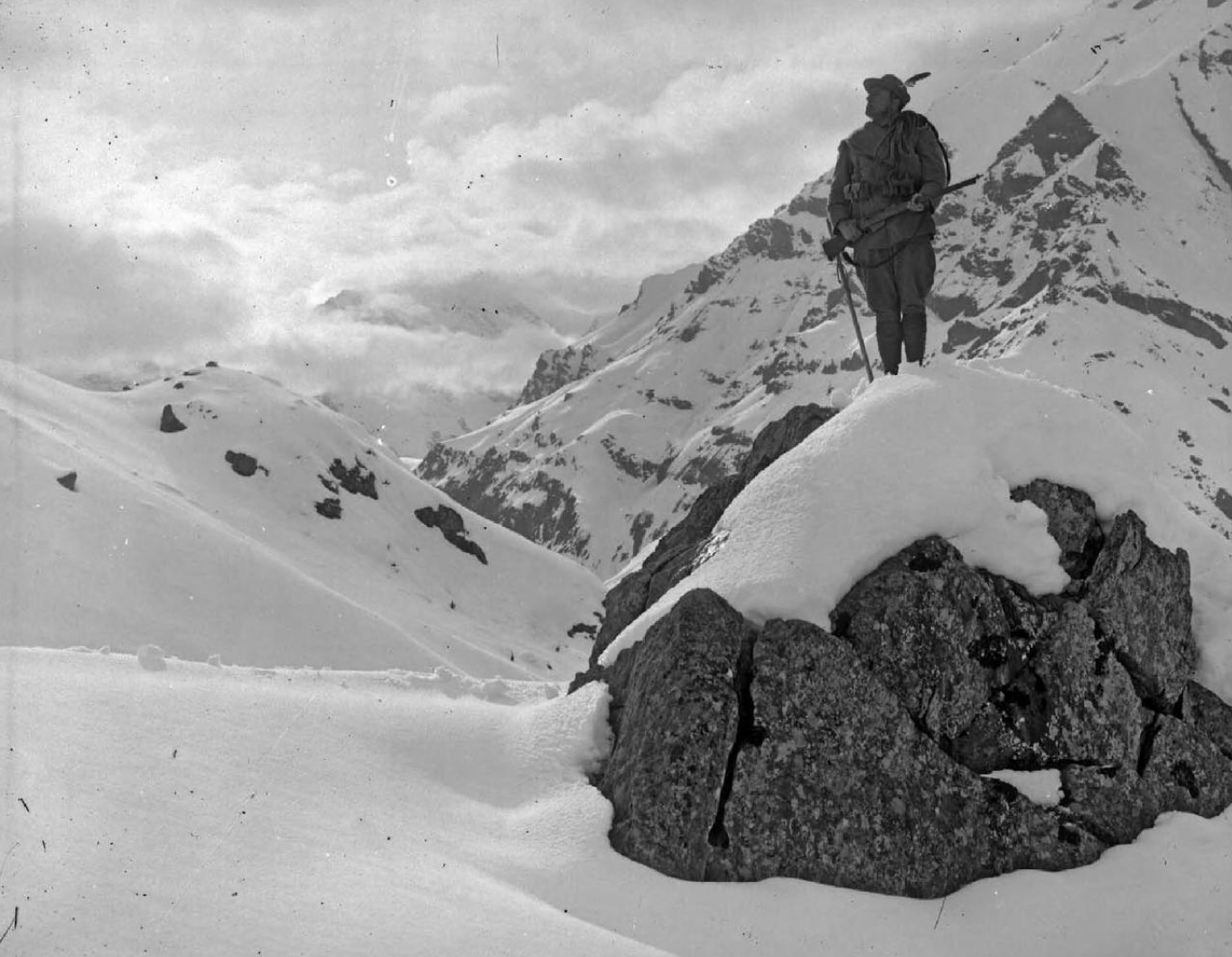
Promotional still from Maggi's 1916 film The Warrior

With war looming in 1914, the production of Italian films slowed down. Maggi moved to the Turin-based company Leonardo Film, for which he directed Il fornaretto di Venezia (starring Umberto Mozzato), Per un'ora d'amore (starring Bella Starace Sainati and Alfredo Sainati), and L'ultima dogaressa (again starring Umberto Mozzato and Anna De Marco). He was called up for military service in 1915 and, upon returning to Turin the following year, found that the film industry was in dire straits. Between 1917 and 1920, he worked for various production companies, including Libertas Film, Film d'Arte, and Milano Films. While none of the films made during this period achieved the same level of public acclaim as his earlier work, noteworthy films include: Cuor di ferro e cuor d'oro (1919), Figuretta (1920) and Il mistero dei bauli neri (1920). The latter was directed by Maggi and his daughter Rina, who was also an actress and later worked primarily in Germany under the stage name Kathryn Berg.

Over the next two years, Maggi's activity declined further. He returned with Ambrosio to film Il giro del mondo di un birichino di Parigi and La ruota del falco (both 1921), and in 1922, he directed La lanterna di Diogene for Caesar Film. In 1923, he joined the new company founded by Lucio D'Ambra at the Teatro Eliseo in Rome, working as an actor. The company aimed to present an Italian repertoire in its own theatre, but the project failed to receive the desired government funding and folded within a year.

In 1924, Maggi directed his last movie, La bambola vivente (The Living Doll), reminiscent of Ernst Lubitsch's renowned 1919 film, The Doll. He appeared as an actor one last time in 1927 in the film Viaggio di nozze in sette (The Wedding Journey in 7), directed by Leopoldo Carlucci. Very little is known about Maggi after he retired from the film industry. Between 1939 and 1940, he oversaw the broadcast of several radio plays and some experimental television shows on Radio Torino. He died in Turin on 22 August. 1946.

== Selected filmography ==
=== Director ===
Year	Title	Preservation status
1908	The Last Days of Pompeii	Public domain; EYE Film Institute Netherlands
1909	Nero	Public domain; National Museum of Cinema
1909	Galileo Galilei	Public domain; Tomijiro Komiya Collection
1910	Il guanto	BFI National Archive
1911	Nozze d'oro	Public domain
1911	The Queen of Ninevah	BFI National Archive
1914	Il fornaretto di Venezia	Lost
1924	La bambola vivente	Public domain; Cineteca Nazionale

== Sources ==
- Brunetta, Gian Piero (2001). Storia del cinema italiano. Il cinema muto, 1895-1929. Milan: Editori Riuniti. ISBN 978-8835950455.
- Moliterno, Gino (2009). The A to Z of Italian Cinema. Lanham, Maryland: Scarecrow Press. ISBN 978-0810870598.
- Winkler, Martin M. (2009). Troy: From Homer's Iliad to Hollywood Epic. Oxford and Malden, MA: John Wiley & Sons. ISBN 978-1405131827.
