= Roberto Omegna =

Italian cinematographer and film director

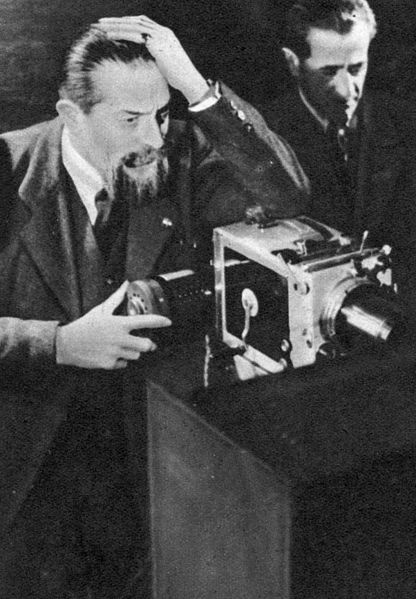
- Roberto Omegna (1939)
- Born: 28 May 1876; Turin, Piedmont; Italy
- Died: 29 November 1948 (aged 72); Turin, Piedmont; Italy
- Occupations: Cinematographer; Director
- Years active: 1904–1936

Roberto Omegna (27 May 1876 – 29 November 1948) was an Italian cinematographer and film director.Omegna assisted Arturo Ambrosio is setting up the Turin-based company Ambrosio Film, which became one of the leading Italian studios of the silent era. While Omegna directed a number of fiction films, he became best known for his documentary efforts such as The Leopard Hunt (1908) and Elephants at Work (1911).

== Biography ==
=== Early life and career ===
Roberto Omegna was born in Turin on 28 May 1876 to Vincenzo Omegna, a railway engineer, and Giuseppina Silva. He graduated in physics and mathematics from Turin University. On 4 June 1904, he married Laura Maffeis.

Impressed by the early cinematic experiments, in 1901 he opened one of Turin's first cinemas, the Cinematografo Edison. He achieved great success by screening 120–200 metre films, which were considered feature films at the time. Initially, he purchased films from French producers such as Pathé, Gaumont, and Georges Méliès. In 1904, he entered into a partnership with Turin-based photographer Arturo Ambrosio and directed his first documentary, La prima corsa automobilistica Susa-Moncenisio, which featured footage of the inaugural Susa-Moncenisio car race. He shot the film using a 50-metre "Urban" camera that he had purchased in Paris earlier that year. The film marked the beginning of the Ambrosio Film one of the leading role in Italian production companies of the silent era. Omegna worked for Ambrosio as a cameraman, director, developer, printer and screenwriter, collaborating with Ermanno Geymonat. Thanks to his extensive technical knowledge, resulting from constant chemical and photographic experimentation, he brought Ambrosio Film to the forefront of international cinema.

One of Ambrosio Film's greatest successes was The Last Days of Pompeii, the first Italian film adaptation of Edward Bulwer-Lytton's 1835 novel of the same name. The novel had already been adapted for the screen in 1898 by the British cinema pioneer Robert W. Paul, albeit in a shortened version. Directed by Luigi Maggi and adapted for the screen by Omegna himself, the film caused a sensation due to its spectacular depiction of the eruption of Mount Vesuvius, and it is considered "the first blockbuster in the history of Italian cinema". It promoted the international distribution of Ambrosio Film's productions, particularly in the United States and France. Following this success, which opened foreign markets to the Turin company, Pathé purchased prints of all of Ambrosio's major films for their technicians to study.

=== Documentarist ===
Omegna continued to shoot documentaries in Italy and exotic, distant locations. In 1907, he took the opportunity during a family trip to South America to produce Traversata del Gran Chaco in Argentina. The following year, during a trip to the Horn of Africa, he directed several films, most notably Caccia al leopardo (Leopard Hunt). Filmed in Keren, Eritrea, at very close range to the leopard — thus posing a great risk to the cameraman — it became the prototype of the exotic film in film history anthologies. Between 1911 and 1912, he directed a series of documentaries in India, Burma and China.

Omegna became one of the most famous filmmakers of the silent era and is considered a pioneer of Italian scientific cinema. In 1908, he collaborated with Professor Camillo Negro to film La neuropatologia (Neuropathology) in Turin. This pioneering scientific documentary recorded patients with nervous system disorders for educational purposes and included notable scenes of hysterical crises. The film premiered on 17 February 1908 at the Ambrosio Biograph Cinema in Turin and was attended by prominent members of the Royal Academy of Medicine, including Cesare Lombroso. Omegna continued his career as a director of scientific documentaries, achieving his first major success in 1911 with the documentary La vita delle farfalle (Life of Butterflies), realized in collaboration with the poet Guido Gozzano. The film won first prize in the scientific film category at the Turin International Film Festival, earning praise from Louis Lumière, one of the festival's judges.

=== World War I and the crisis of the Italian movie industry ===
Production continued successfully in the following years, interrupted only by outbreak og World War I. During the war, Omegna had the opportunity to shoot films on the Italian front (1915–16). However, these films were subject to various cuts and censorship by the Supreme Military Command. After the war, Omegna ended his partnership with Ambrosio Film, overwhelmed by the crisis that affected the entire Italian cinema industry at the time. He founded a small private company called Film Della Natura. Between 1923 and 1925, he produced several films intended primarily for educational purposes, including La mantide religiosa, La vita del grillo campestre, and La vita delle api. In 1926, he moved to Rome at the invitation of the Istituto Luce, founded by Benito Mussolini in 1924 to produce and distribute educational and didactic films.

=== Later career ===
Between 1927 and 1930, Omegna focused his interest on marine biology. He spent a great deal of time at the Stazione Zoologica Anton Dohrn in Naples and the Higher Institute of Agriculture in Portici, filming underwater plant and animal life for films such as Navigatori argentei del mare, Giardini del mare and Abitanti del mare. Meanwhile, he further refined his shooting techniques, as demonstrated by the 1930–31 documentary Dall'uovo alla gallina (From the Egg to the Hen), initially presented under the title I ventuno giorni del pulcino (The Twenty-One Days of the Chick). The film is still considered to be of high technical quality today, particularly with regard to the microcinematography techniques used to visualize embryos within their protective membranes.

In 1934, he was commissioned by the Istituto Luce to make Gloria, one of the first documentaries based entirely on archival material. He selected and edited images from the extensive cinematic documentation of the Great War (produced by various cameramen) in accordance with fascist ideology, which imposed significant historical reinterpretations. For instance, the battle of Caporetto was omitted. Several of his films won awards for best scientific film at the Venice Film Festival between 1936 and 1941. In 1942, he co-directed his final film, Morfologia del fiore, with Eugenio Bava. When the Istituto Luce was transferred to Venice in 1943, he returned to Turin, where he remained until the end of the war. Following the war, he attempted to make a documentary about the physiology of the human eye, but was unable to do so due to his age and health issues. He died in Turin on 19 November 1948.

== Selected filmography ==
=== Cinematographer ===
- The Last Days of Pompeii (1908)

== Bibliography ==
- Tosi, Virgilio (1979). "Il pioniere Roberto Omegna (1876-1948)" (PDF). Bianco e Nero. 40 (3): 1–67.
- Bernardini, Aldo (1996). Il cinema muto italiano 1905-1909. Rome: Rai Libri. ISBN 978-8839709134.
- Moliterno, Gino (2009). Historical Dictionary of Italian Cinema. Lanham, MD: Scarecrow Press. ISBN 978-0810868960.
- Rendi, Giovanna (2013). "OMEGNA, Roberto". Dizionario Biografico degli Italiani (in Italian). Vol. 79: Nursio–Ottolini Visconti. Rome: Istituto dell'Enciclopedia Italiana. ISBN 978-88-12-00032-6.
