= Nero (1909 film) =

1909 film by Luigi Maggi

Nerone, o La caduta di Roma
- Theatrical release poster
- Directed by: Luigi Maggi, Arturo Ambrosio
- Screenplay by: Decoroso Bonifanti , Arrigo Frusta
- Based on: Nerone by Pietro Cossa
- Produced by: Ambrosio Film
- Starring: Alberto Capozzi; Lydia De Roberti; Luigi Maggi; Mirra Principi; Ernesto Vaser; Ercole Vaser
- Music by: Giovanni Vitrotti
- Release date: 1909
- Running time: 14 minutes
- Country: Italy
- Languages: Silent film; Italian intertitles

Nero, or The Fall of Rome (Italian: Nerone, o la caduta di Roma) is a 1909 Italian short silent Epic film directed by Luigi Maggi and Arturo Ambrosio, based on the eponymous 1872 drama by Pietro Cossa. This is one of the oldest surviving Italian epic films about Ancient Rome.

== Plot ==
One day emperor Nero leaves his palace accompanied by his wife Claudia Octavia and meets a charming patrician named Poppea. With the help of his freedman Epaphroditus he finds her at a party she is attending and brings her back to his palace.

Nero presents Poppea to the people as the new empress and repudiates his wife. Octavia asks him to restitute the empire which he had received as her dowry, but the emperor harshly chases her away. Later, Nero is convinced by Poppea to have Octavia killed. One of her maidservants swears revenge and goes to Rome where she spreads the news of the assassination. The people, already tired of Nero's exactions and whims, decide to revolt against the emperor.

Informed of the danger of an imminent popular uprising, Nero orders to set fire to the city, which he watches from a terrace, rejoicing and playing his lyra.

Abandoned by all and sentenced to death by the Senate, he is beset by visions of the massacres he ordered. He flees with Epaphroditus seeking refuge at the villa of the freedman Faonte. Discovered and chased into the woods together with Epaphroditus, he kills himself with his sword.

== Cast ==
- Alberto Capozzi as Nerone
- Lydia De Roberti as Poppea
- Mirra Principi as Claudia Octavia
- Luigi Maggi as Epaphroditus
- Ernesto Vaser as a Senator / a Man in the crowd
- Ercole Vaser as a Spy
- Serafino Vite as a Man in the crowd
- Leo Ragusi as a Man in the crowd
- Paolo Azzurri as a Senator

== Reception ==
The film was a success both in Italy and on foreign markets. Nearly 300 copies were sold abroad at the time of the original release.

The scene where Nero is beset by bad conscience, having a vision of the Christians he had sent to martyrdom (shown by a red-toned double exposure shot), had a strong impact on the audience. The reviewer for the Moving Picture World wrote on 6 November 1909 that the film possessed "such a marvellous realism of affect that as we sat and watched this colored part of the film, we seemed, as it were, to hear the cries of the victims".

The film received the First Prize at the first edition of the World Competition of Cinematography in Milan (Italian: Primo Concorso Mondiale di Cinematografia di Milano).

A parody of Nero, Tontolini Nerone, was released in 1910.

== Analysis ==
The film is composed of 13 one shot scenes, with 6 intertitles. It is characterised by lavish sets and costumes and a cinematography which is still very close to theatre representation, with a succession of tableaux vivants filmed by a static frontal camera. All but two sets are indoors sets very similar to theatre sets including painted backdrops giving an illusion of perspective. Two shots are filmed outdoors in a garden.

Maria Wyke mentions Nero as "one of the first tentative experiments in the screening of Roman history made by an Italian production house", remarking that it bases its plot on "a vastly condensed synthesis of the Italian dramatic tradition for Nero - from grandiose production of Claudio Monteverdi's opera L'incoronazione di Poppea (first performed in 1642) to recent stagings of Pietro Cossa's popular tragedy Nerone". Regarding the cinematographic style, she writes: "Highly dependent still on the conventions of the Italian stage, almost every scene of Nerone (...) operates as a self-contained unit within which the actors playing Nero, Octavia or Poppea, planted before papier mâché backdrops and facing their unseen film audience, gesture majestically". Only the scene mentioned above on Nero's vision is regarded as a "celebration of the innovatory powers of cinema".
