= Doctor Antonio (1914 film) =

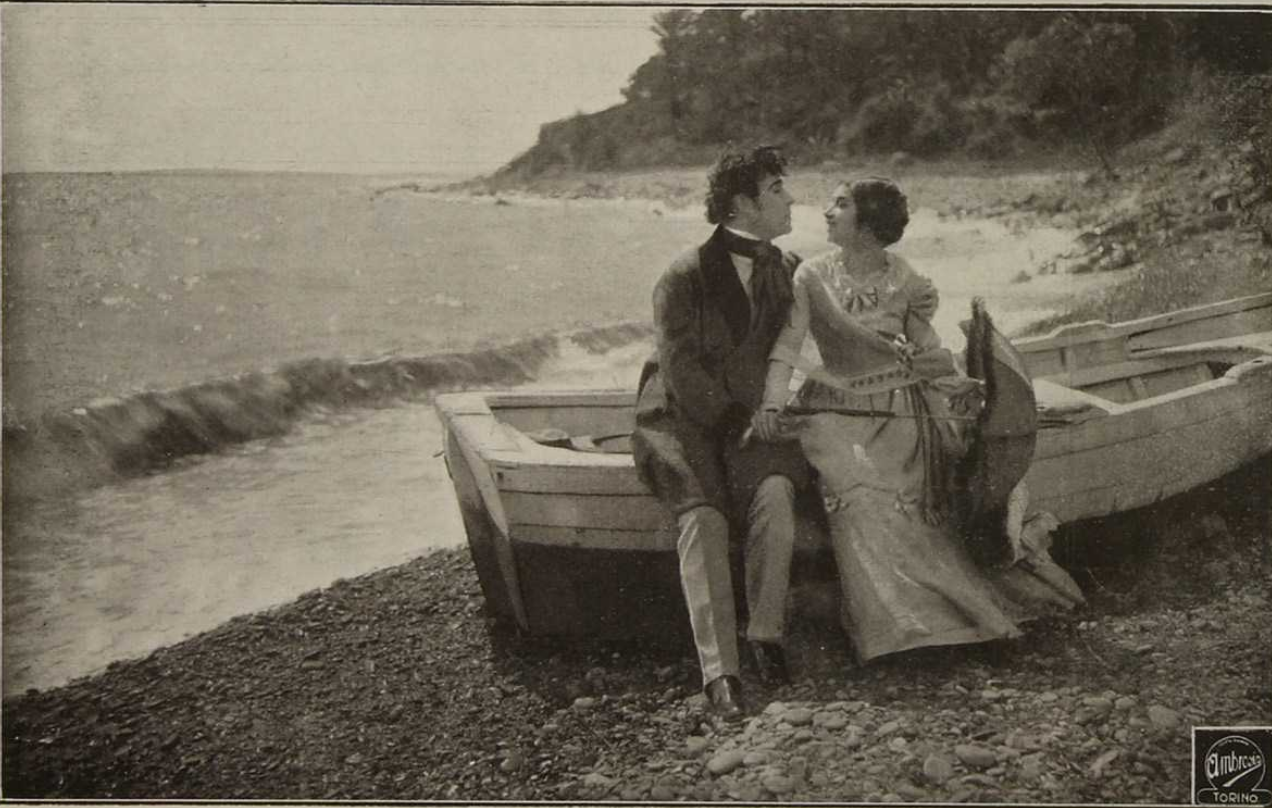
- Directed by: Eleuterio Rodolfi
- Written by: Giovanni Ruffini (novel)
- Produced by: Arturo Ambrosio
- Starring: Hamilton Revelle; Fernanda Negri Pouget; Alfredo Bertone
- Production company: Ambrosio Film
- Distributed by: Ambrosio Film
- Release date: July 1914
- Country: Italy
- Languages: Silent; Italian intertitles

Doctor Antonio (Italian:Il dottor Antonio) is a 1914 Italian silent historical film directed by Eleuterio Rodolfi and starring Hamilton Revelle, Fernanda Negri Pouget and Alfredo Bertone. It is an adaptation of the 1855 novel Doctor Antonio by Giovanni Ruffini. In the mid-nineteenth century an Italian revolutionary falls in love with a wealthy young Englishwoman.

It was made by the Turin-based studio Ambrosio Film.

== Cast ==
- Hamilton Revelle as Dottor Antonio
- Fernanda Negri Pouget as Lucy Davenne
- Alfredo Bertone as Aubrey Davenne
- Armand Pouget as Sir John Davenne
- Cesare Zocchi as Re di Napoli
- Alberto Albertini

== Bibliography ==
- Goble, Alan. The Complete Index to Literary Sources in Film. Walter de Gruyter, 1999.
