= Turin International =

1911 world's fair in Italy

1911 Turin
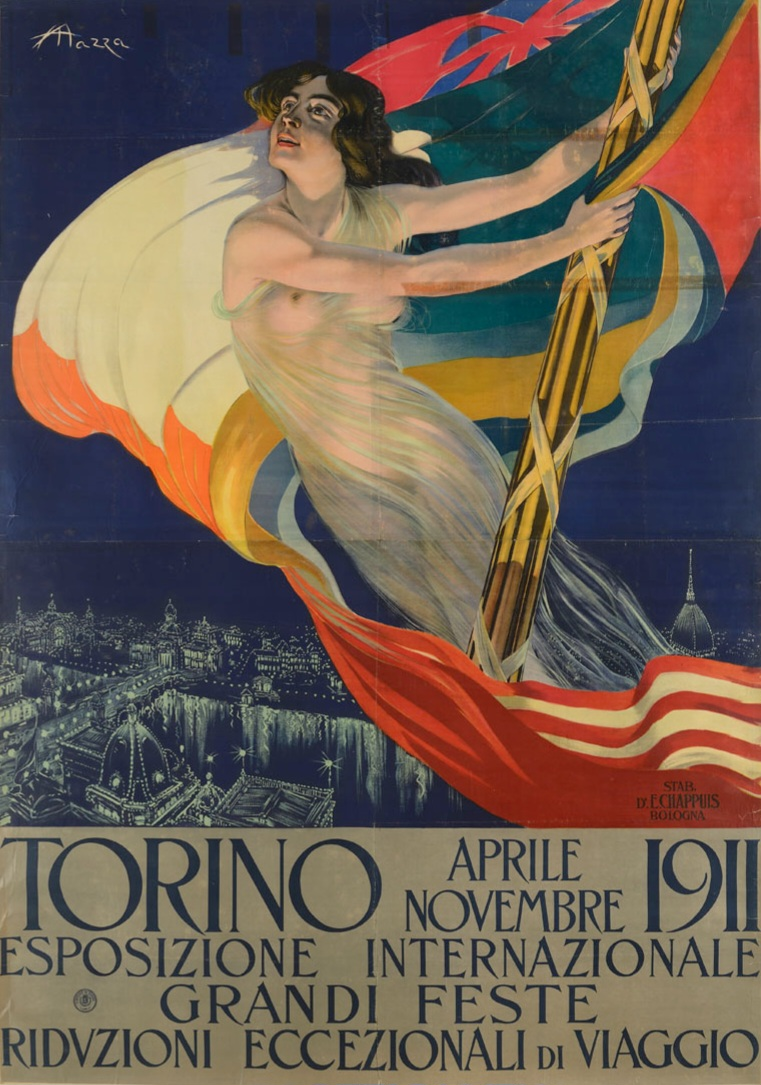
- Turin 1911 Expo poster designed by Aldo Mazza

Overview
- BIE-class: Universal exposition
- Category: Historical Expo
- Name: Esposizione internazionale dell'Industria e del Lavoro
- Area: 100.16 hectares (247.5 acres)
- Visitors: 7,409,145

Participant(s)
- Countries: 30

Location
- Country: Italy
- City: Turin
- Venue: Parco del Valentino
- Coordinates: 45°03′7.8″N 7°41′4.8″E

Timeline
- Bidding: 11 February 1907
- Opening: 29 April 1911
- Closure: 19 November 1911

Universal expositions
- Previous: Brussels International 1910 in Brussels
- Next: Exposition universelle et internationale (1913) in Ghent

The Turin International was a world's fair held in Turin in 1911 titled Esposizione internazionale dell'industria e del lavoro. It was opened by King Victor Emmanuel III on April 29, 1911, and lasted until November 19, 1911. It received 7,409,145 visits and covered 247 acres.

== Summary ==
The fair opened on 29 April, was held just nine years after an earlier Turin fair which had focused on the decorative arts, and at the same time as another Italian fair in Rome, also with an arts focus. This fair deliberately distinguished itself by focusing on industry and labour.

The fair was organized together with other national exhibitions in Rome and Florence, on the occasion of the fiftieth anniversary of the Unification of Italy. It was held in the Parco del Valentino (as were the three previous Turin fairs in 1884, 1885 and 1902 and the subsequent 1924 Turin fair).

The main designers of the Fair were: Pietro Fenoglio, Giacomo Saldadori di Wiesenhof, and Stefano Molli. Only the Stefano Molli's archive (preserved by Fondazione Marazza in Borgomanero) has been identified and contains around 600 architectural documents regarding the Turin 1911 Fair.

A total of 3,500 workers were employed to construct the exhibition area. Several pavilions were built, covering an area of approximately 350,000 square metres. More than 7 million people visited the fair.

== Participants ==
Participating countries were Argentina, Austria, Belgium, Bolivia, Brazil, Bulgaria, Chile, China, Colombia, Denmark, Ecuador, France, Germany, Greece, Hungary, Italy, Japan, Mexico, Netherlands, Nicaragua, Peru, Russia, Serbia, Siam, Spain, Switzerland, Turkey, United Kingdom, United States and Uruguay.

== National pavilions ==
The Art Nouveau Hungarian pavilion was designed by Emil Töry, Maurice Pogány and Dénes Györgyi; the Brazilian pavilion incorporated paintings by Arthur Timótheo da Costa; the Siamese pavilion was designed by Mario Tamagno and Annibale Rigotti and had a multi-colored roof with a gold dome and the Ottoman pavilion (or Pavilion of Turkey) was designed by Léon Gurekian.

=== The British pavilion ===
Defined as a "grande nazione amica" (great friendly nation), Great Britain featured prominently in the Exhibition. The British pavilion, situated near the Fountain of the Twelve Months, was designed by architects Molli, Fenoglio, and Salvadori. It was a two-story structure featuring the Coat of arms of England and two spires topped with the Royal Crown. Located on the right side of the Po River, the pavilion was adjacent to the Gallery of Machines, highlighting Britain's focus on technological and industrial progress.

== Exhibits and themes ==
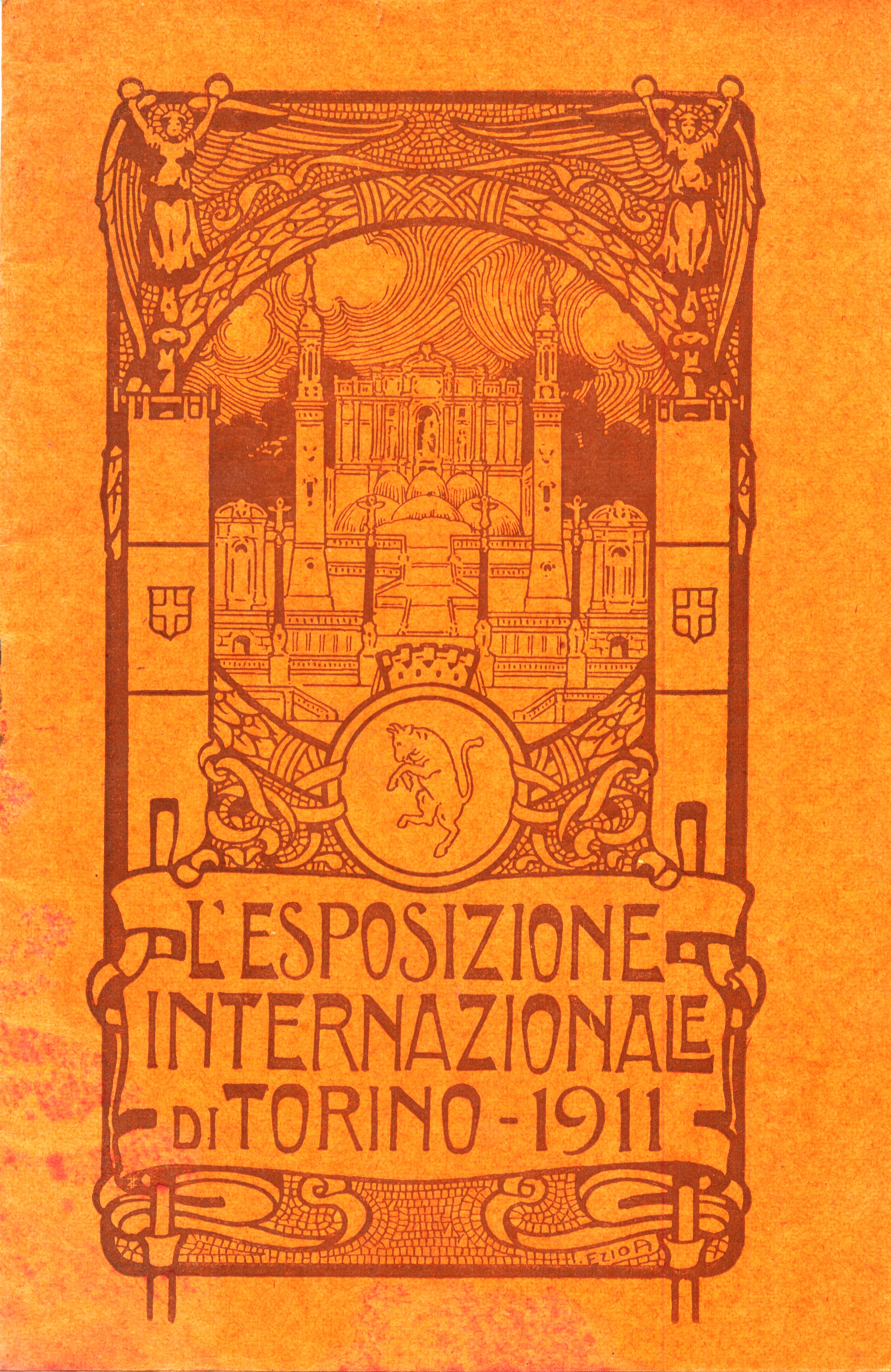
Official Expo logo

There were many events connected to the exhibition, including exhibitions, displays and competitions, as well as demonstrations of new electrical and mechanical equipment.

Giuseppe Verdi's Falstaff was performed on the opening night (29 April) at the Teatro Regio. Between April and May, numerous concerts were also held, including five by the Teatro Regio Orchestra, conducted by the renowned Arturo Toscanini. Other renowned conductors performed during the exhibition too, including Robert Kajanus, Tullio Serafin and Willem Mengelberg. The Viennese composer Gustav Mahler was also scheduled to perform in October, but he died in May of that year.

Important congresses and conferences were held during those months, including the 9th Congress of Industrialists and Merchants, the National Congress of Italian Builders, and the Interparliamentary Peace Congress. Numerous sporting competitions were also held as part of the event.

A film competition was launched and divided into three categories: artistic, scientific and educational. Films that had not been released were submitted for this competition, which took place inside the Egyptian Pavilion and was one of its main attraction. First prize in the artistic category was awarded to Nozze d'oro, directed by Luigi Maggi and produced by Ambrosio Film; second prize went to Il povero di Assisi, directed by Enrico Guazzoni and produced by Cines. Among the scientific films, first prize went to La vita delle farfalle, also produced by Ambrosio and directed by Roberto Omegna with the collaboration of Guido Gozzano. Also awarded in the educational section were: Il tamburino sardo by Cines and L'Odissea by Giuseppe de Liguoro, produced by Milano Films.

Between 4th and 10th June took place the 'Rome-Turin Aviation Competition'. The winner received a prize of two hundred and fifty thousand lire, a considerable sum at the time.

== Views of the Exposition ==
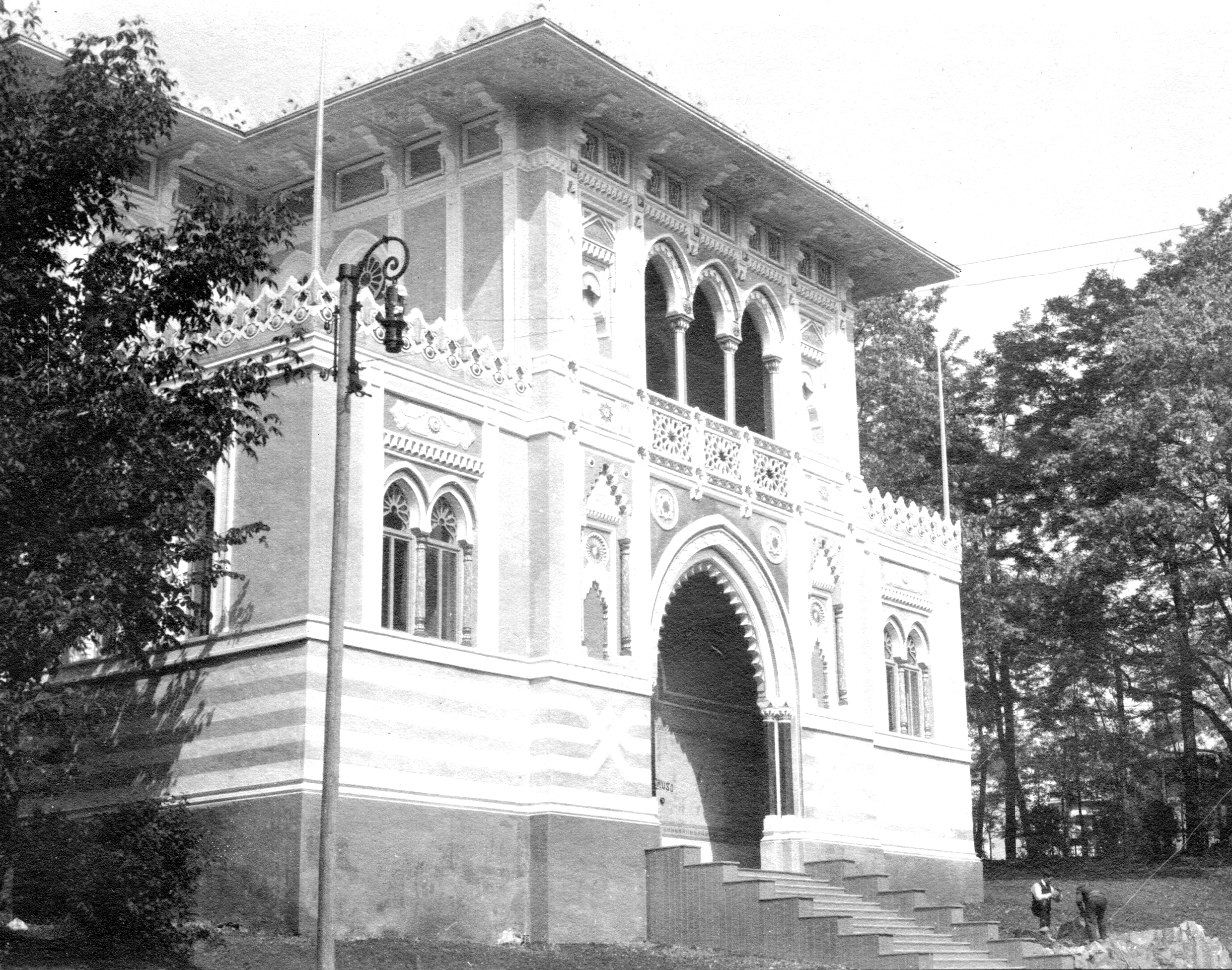
Pavilion of the Ottoman Empire

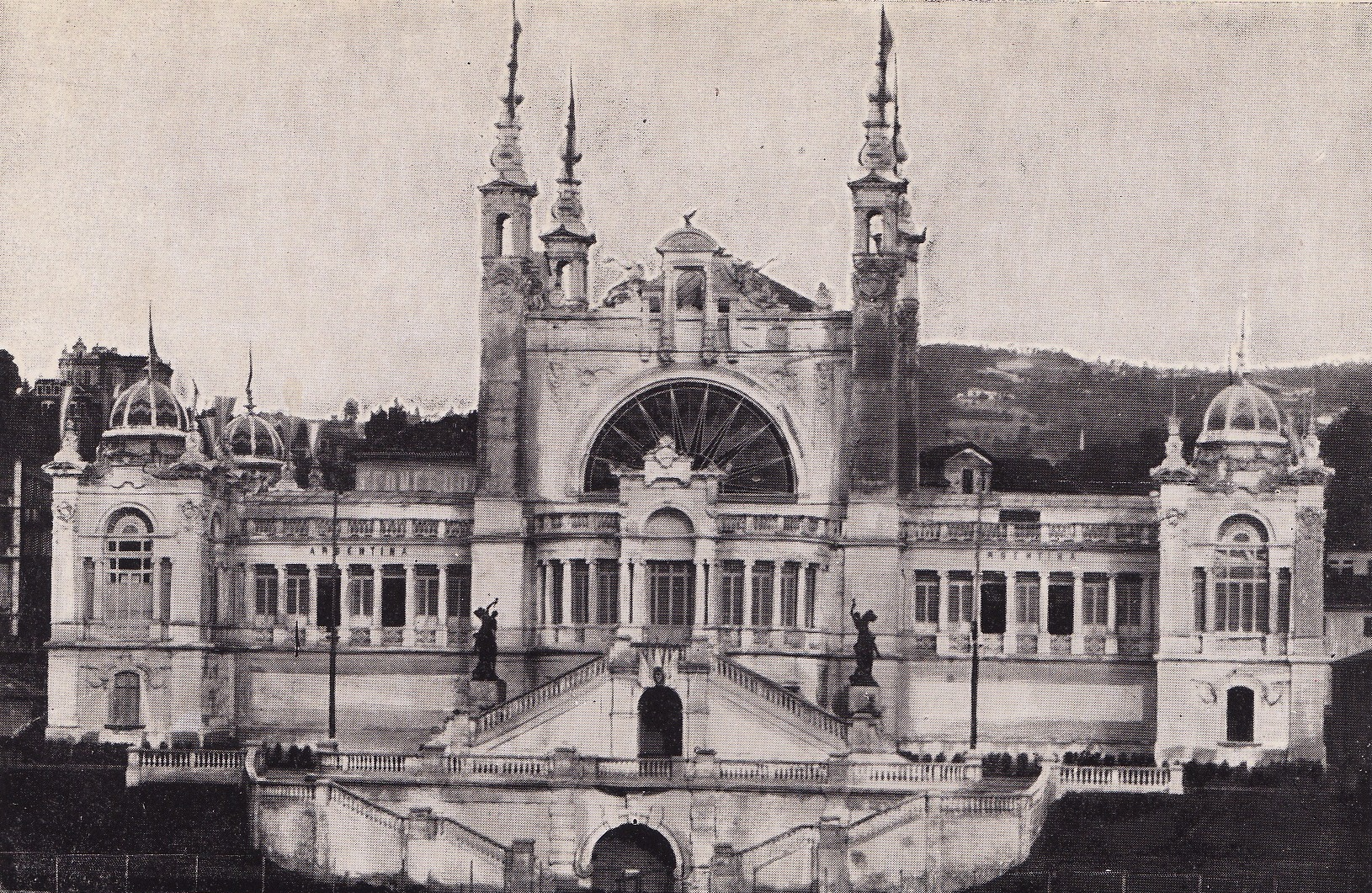
Pavillon of Argentina

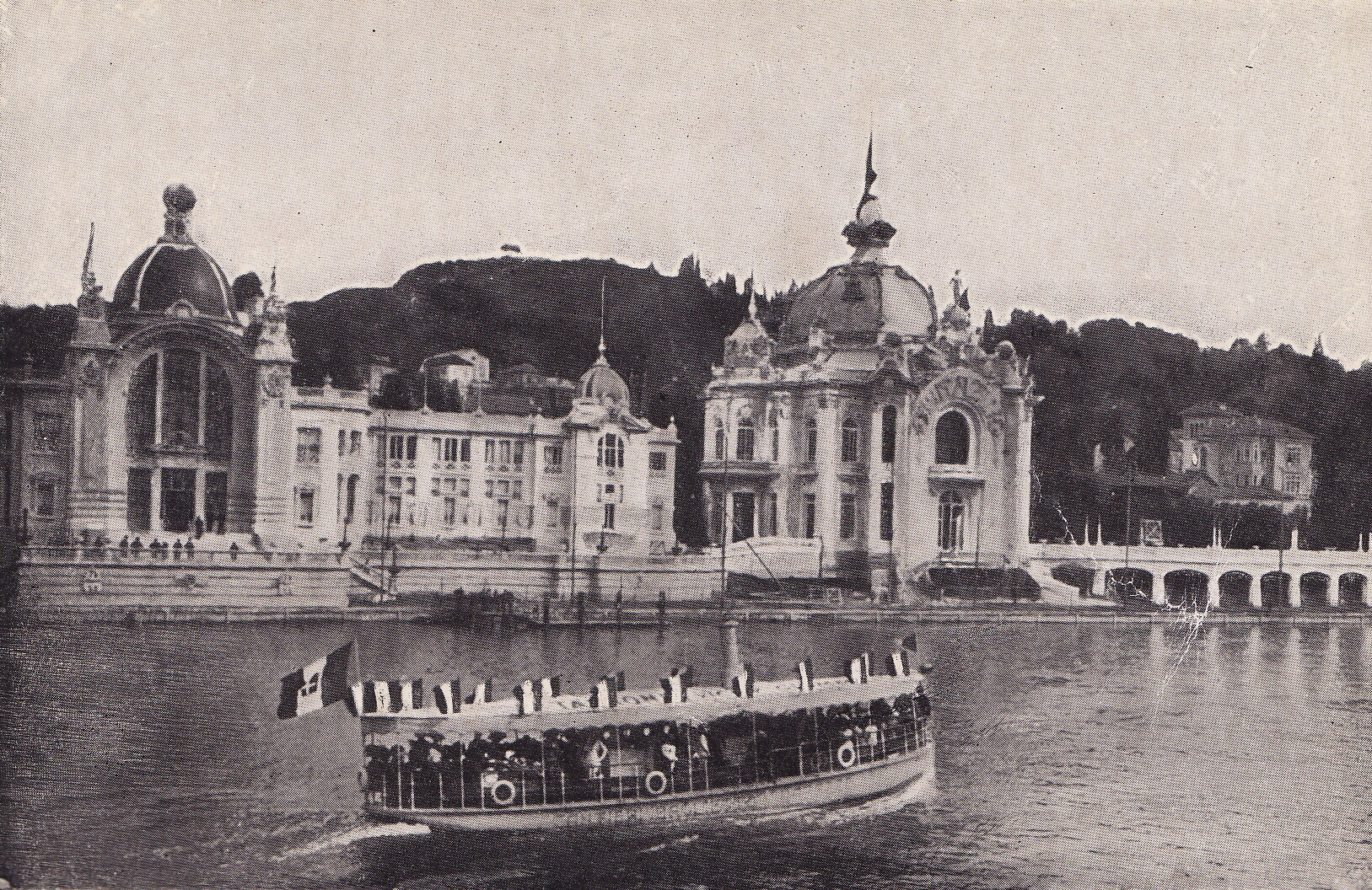
Pavillon of Uruguay

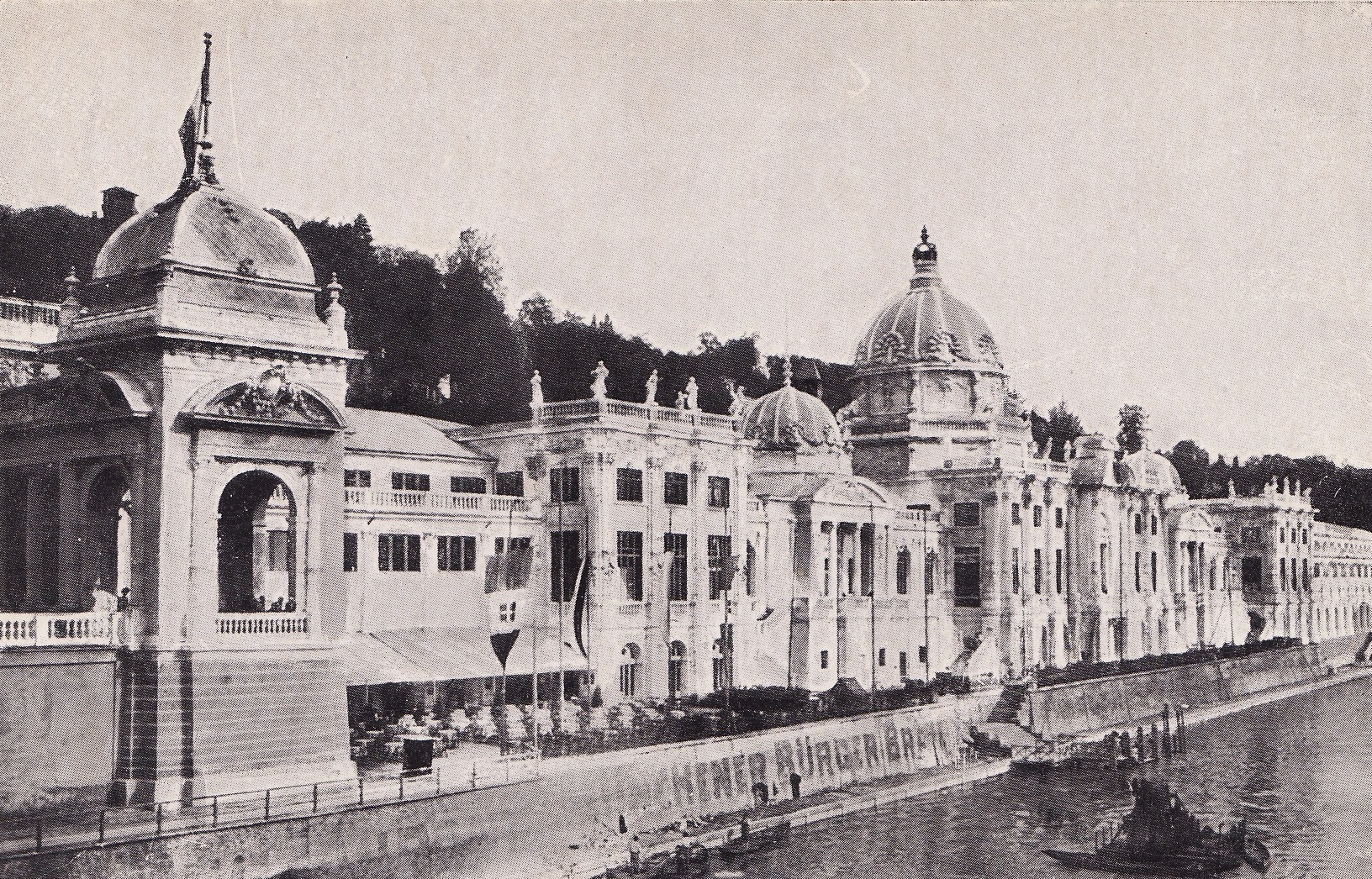
Pavillon of Germany

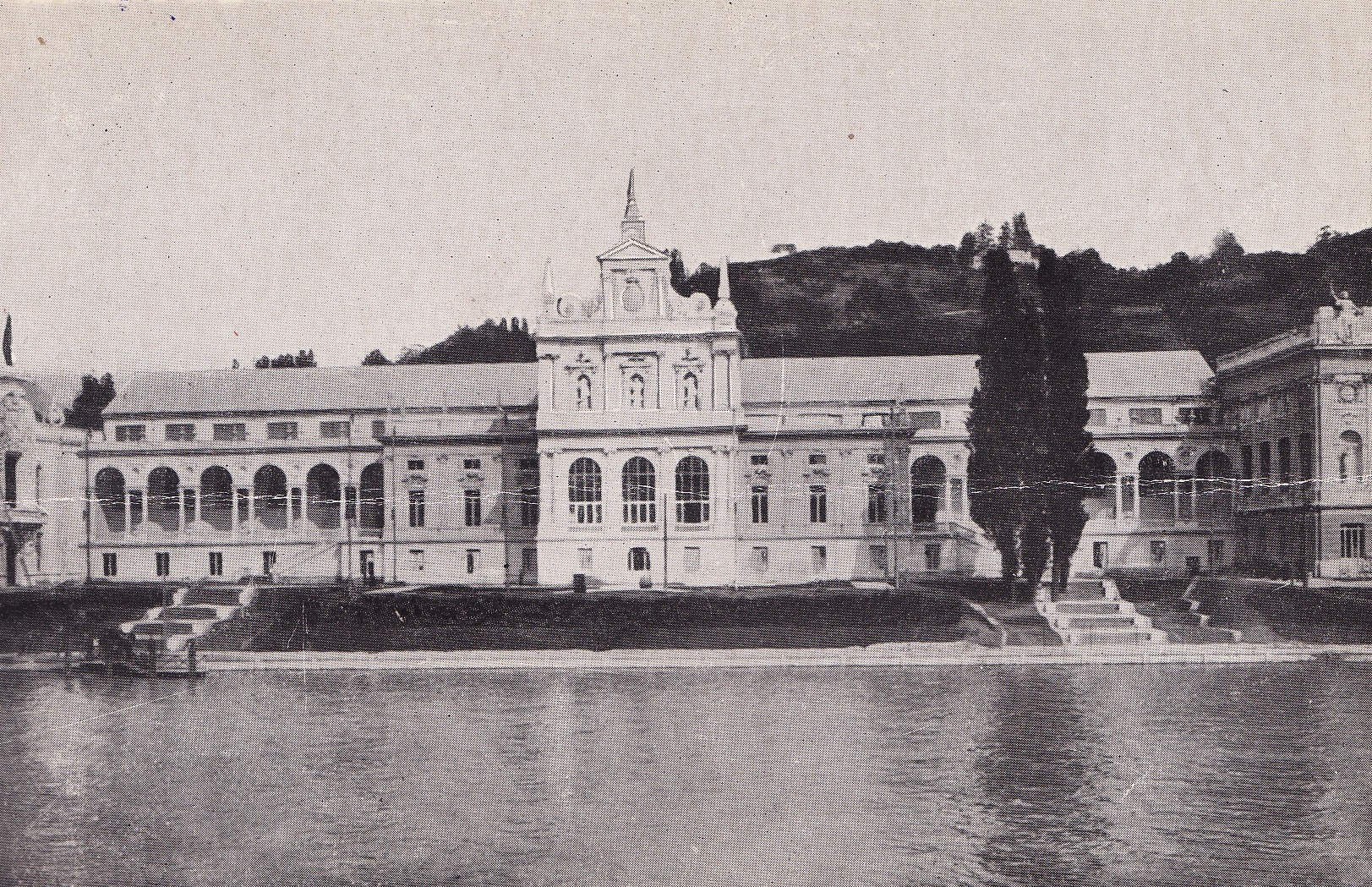
Pavillon of Belgium

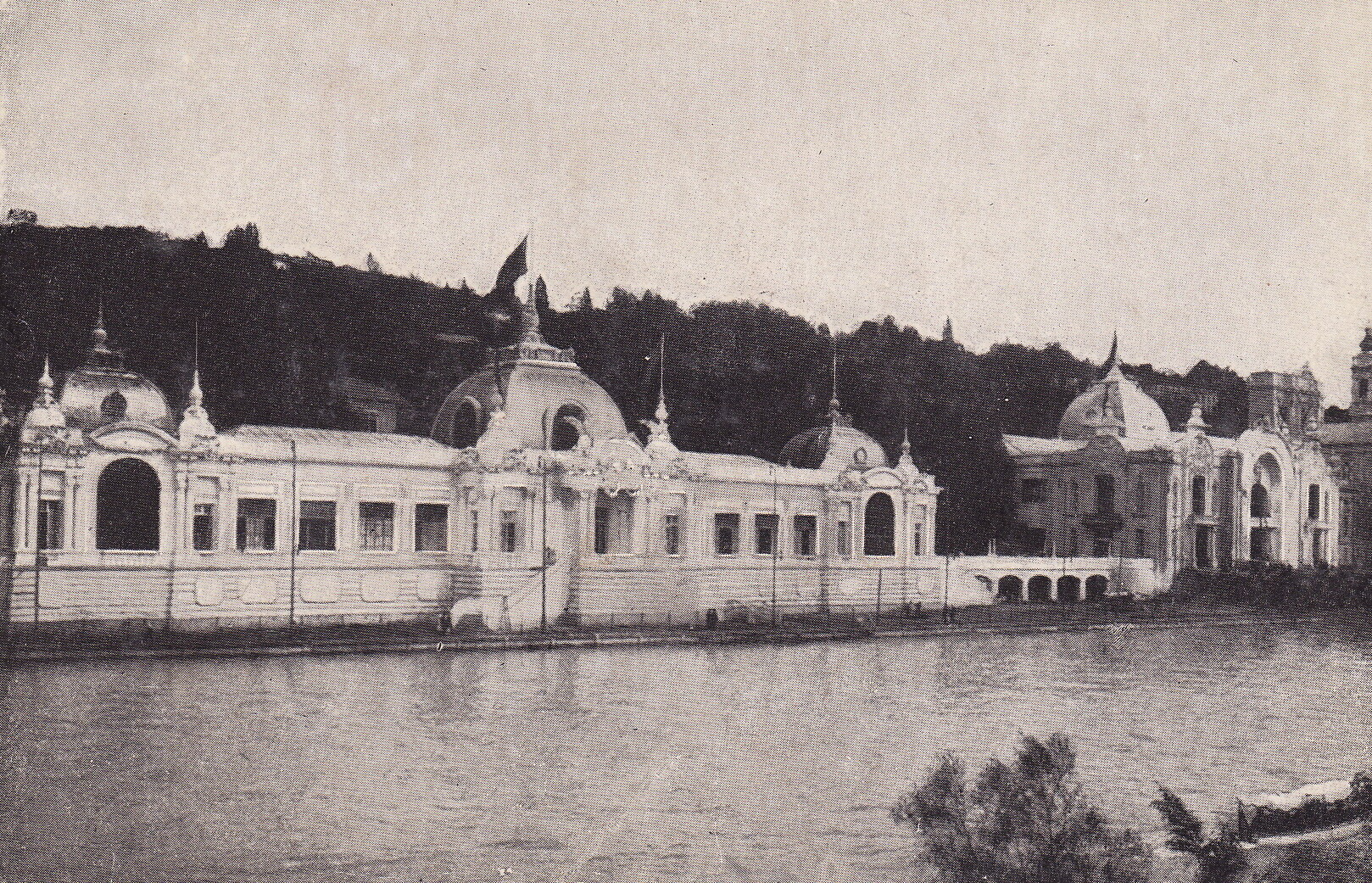
Pavillon of Brazil

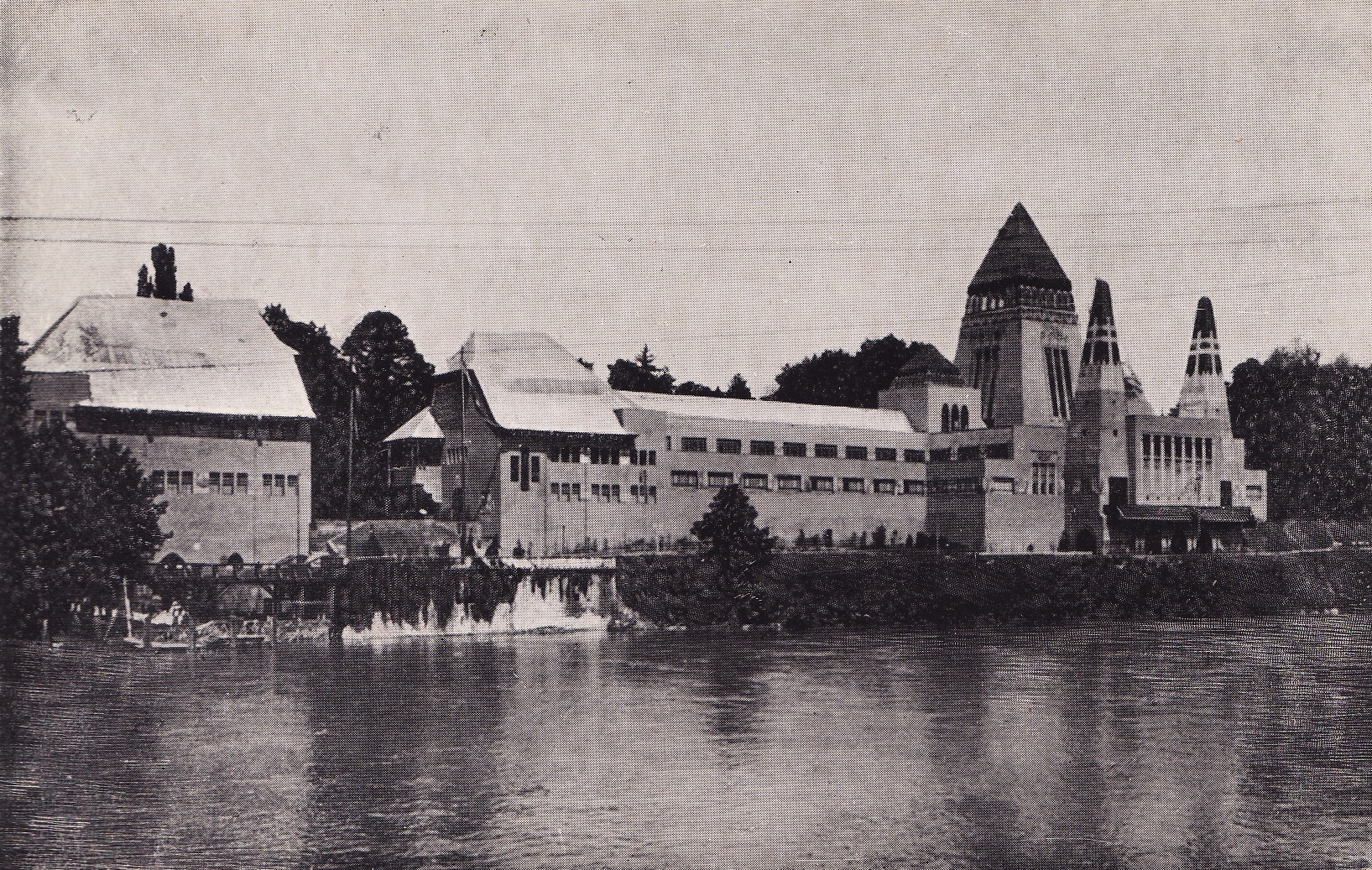
Pavillon of Hungary

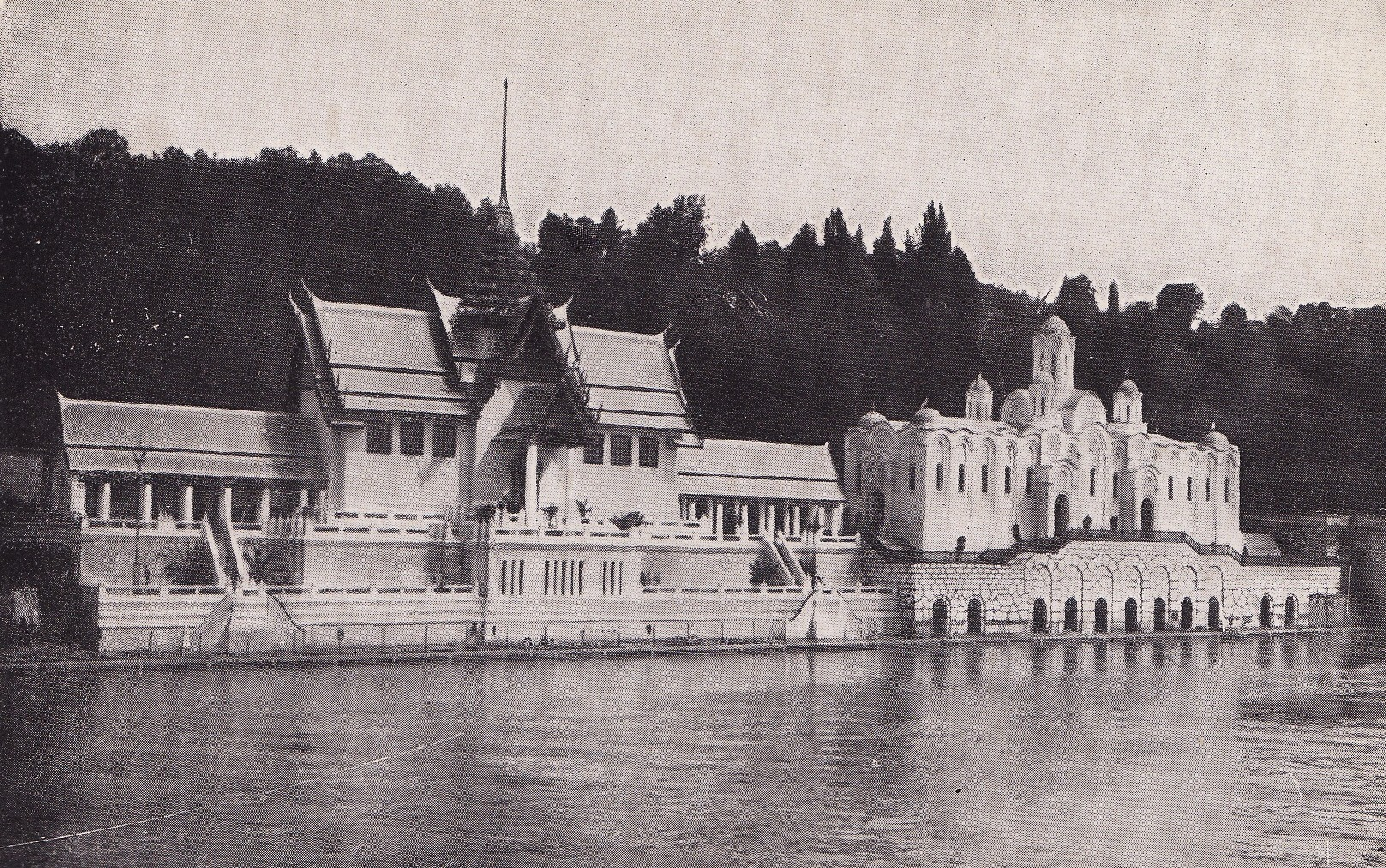
Pavillons of del Siam and Serbia

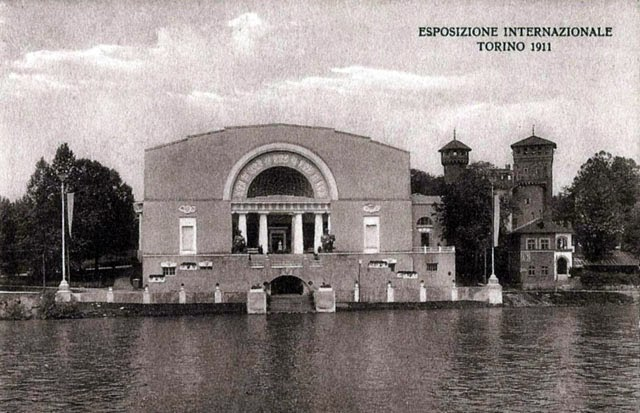
Pavillon of Russia

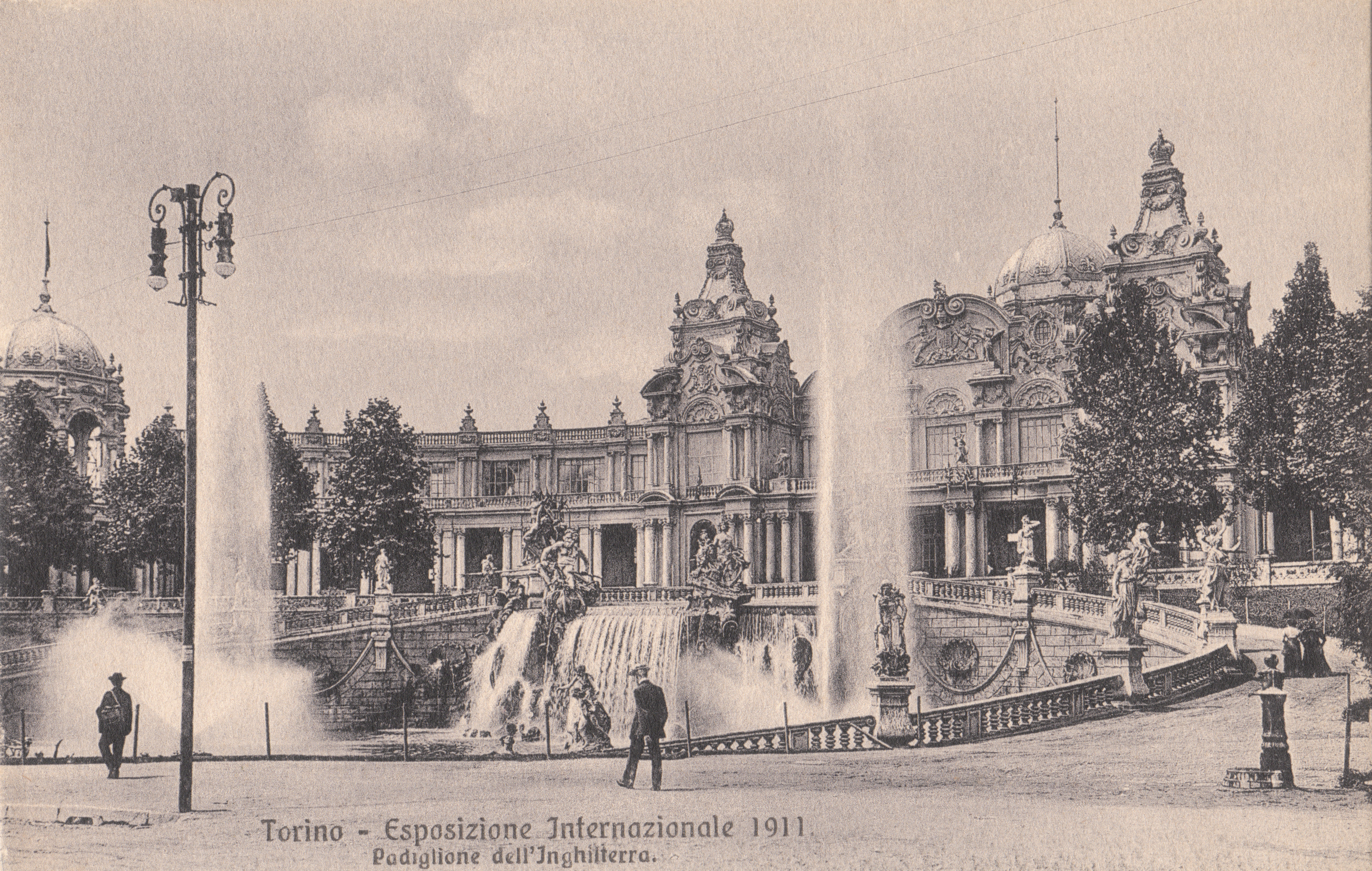
Pavillon of Great Britain

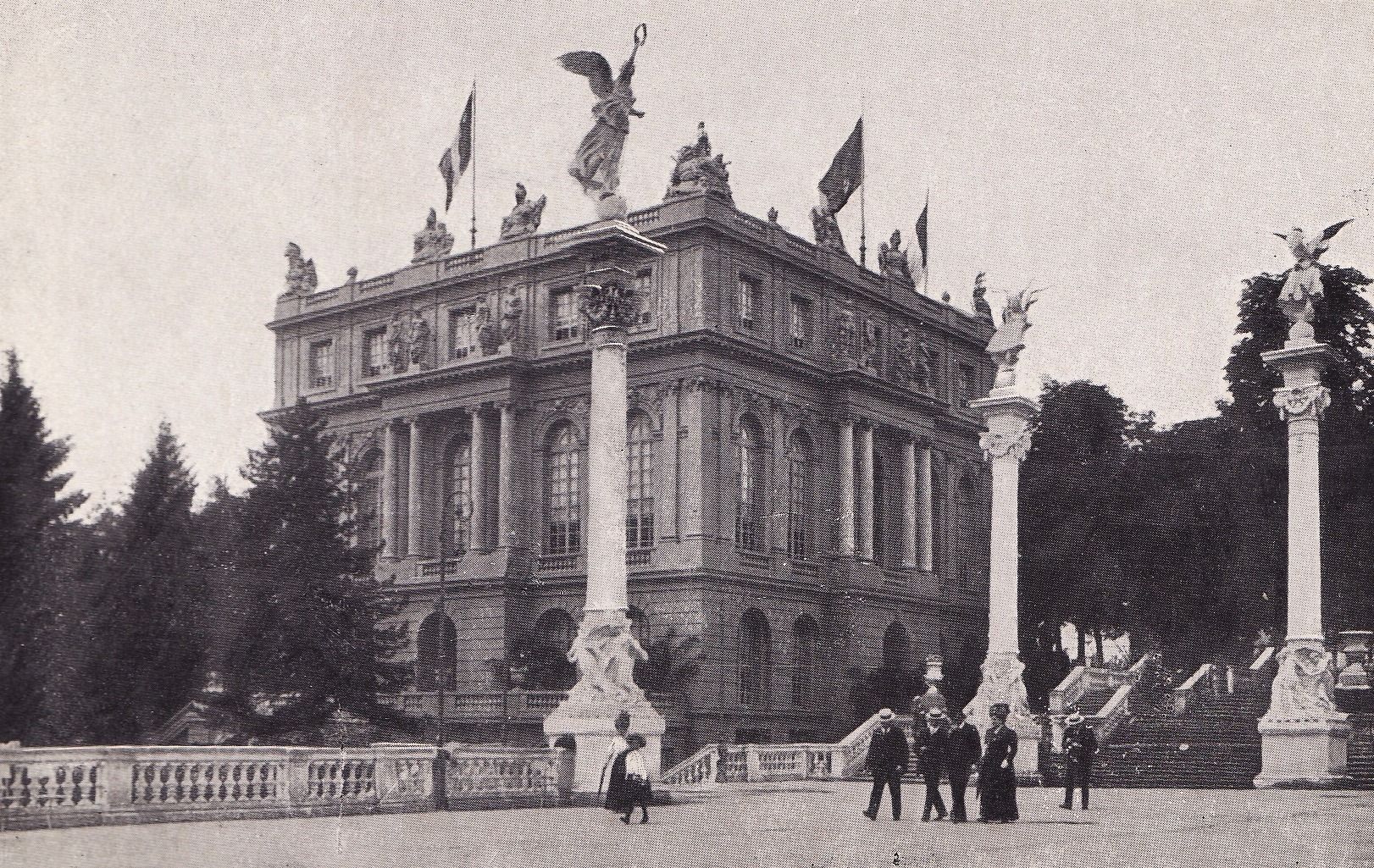
Pavillon of the city of Paris

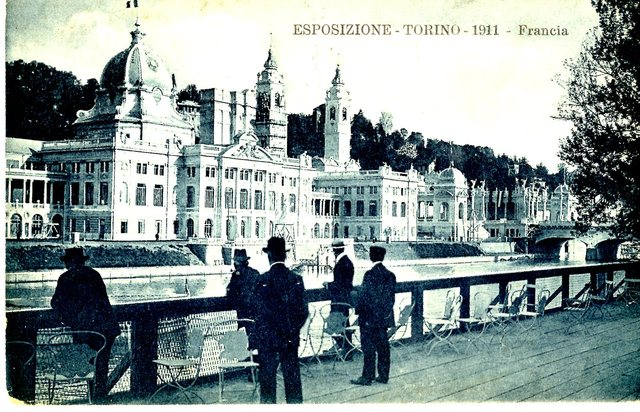
Pavillon of France

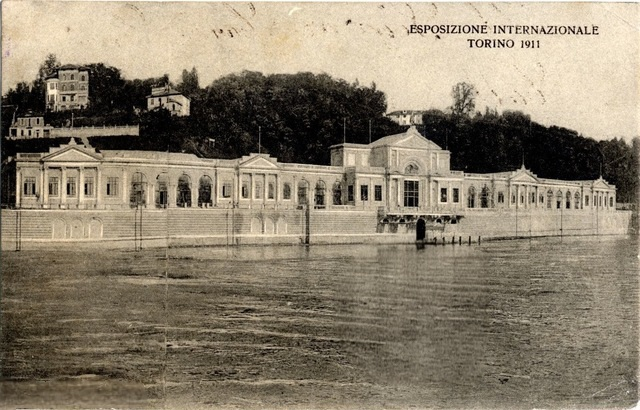
Pavillon of the United States

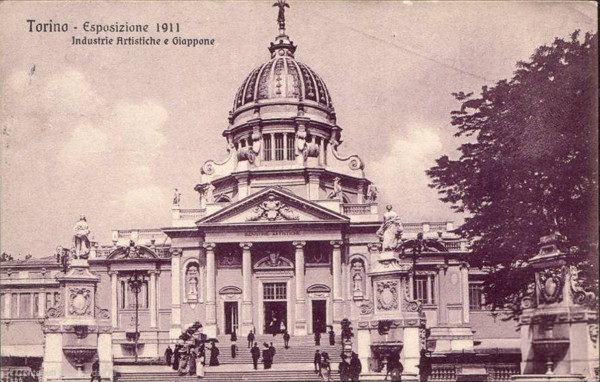
Pavillon of Japan

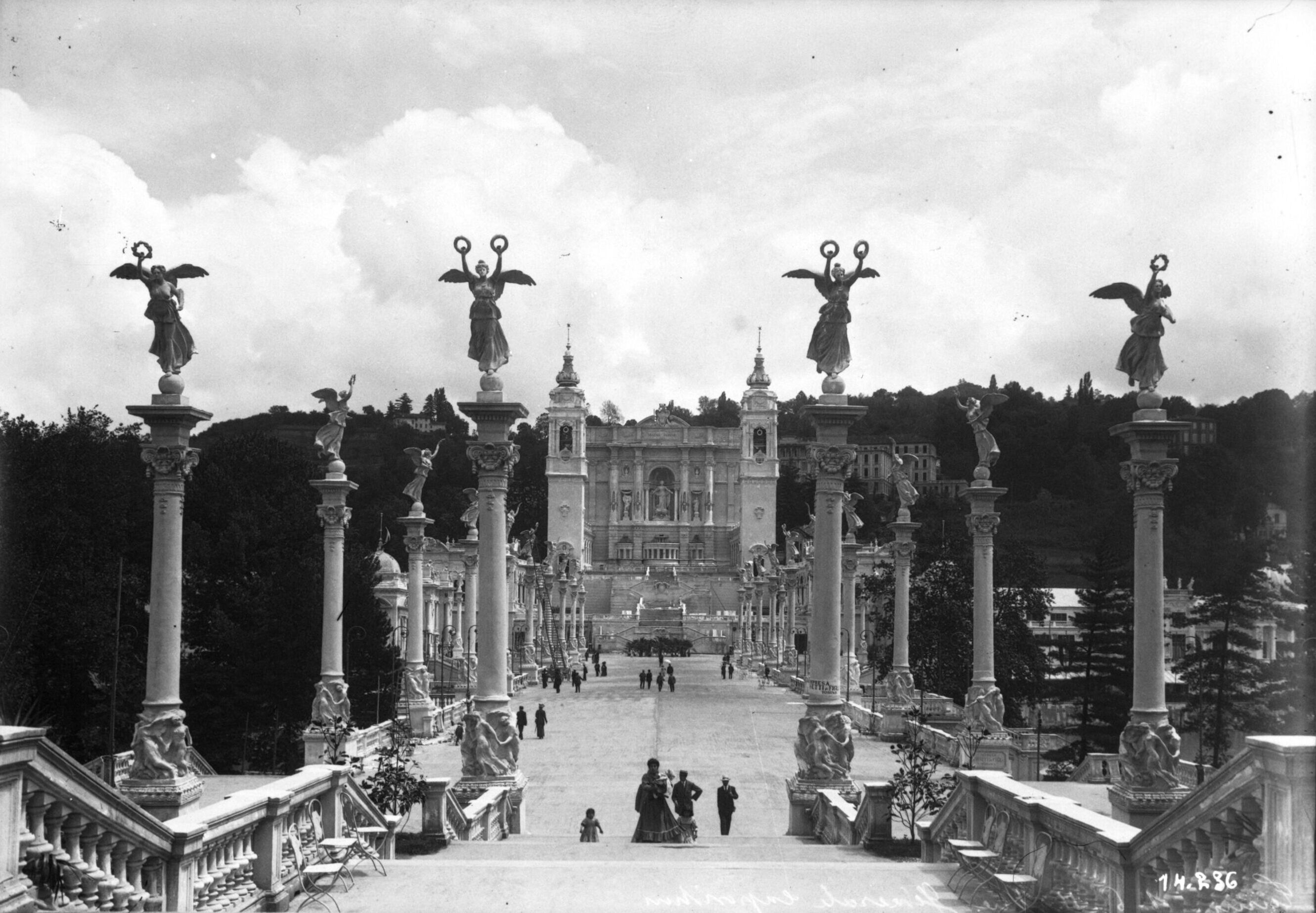
The monumental bridge on the Po River

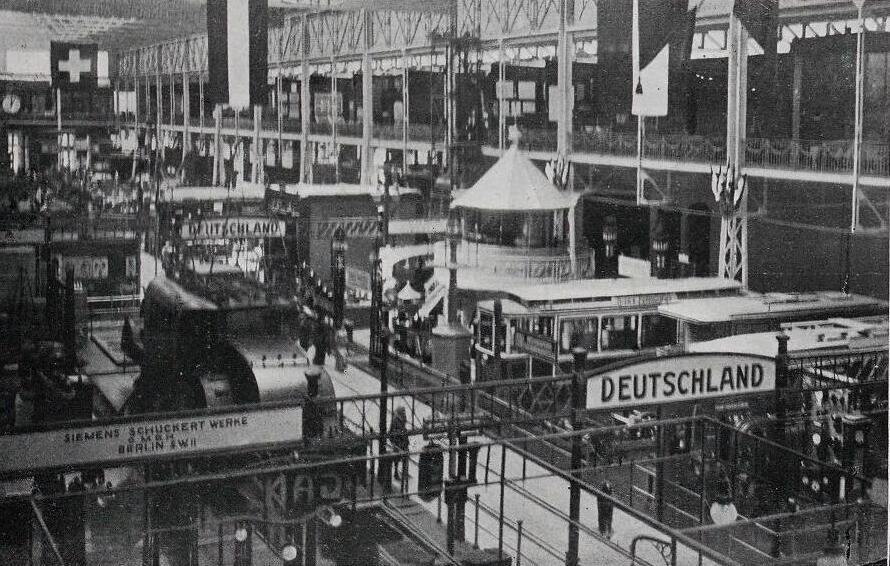
The International Gallery of Electricity

== See also ==
- Images from over 200 pages from the official guide to the fair
- Material about this exhibition is stored at the Science Museum in London
