= Paris Film Congress =

Meeting of leading film companies

The Paris Film Congress was a major meeting of European film producers and distributors in the French capital Paris from 2–4 February 1909. It intended to create an association to protect the interests of the participants through the formation of a trade organisation, a plan that ultimately failed.

Amongst the major companies taking part were Pathé, Gaumont and Éclair of France, Cines and Ambrosio Film of Italy, Messter Film of Germany, Hepworth Pictures of Britain and Nordisk of Denmark. Vitagraph an American producer and member of the MPPC, but who had extensive distribution and production interests in Europe, also attended. It was called mainly in response to the formation of the MPPC, a cartel of the leading film producers in the United States, organised by Thomas Edison. For the major European producers, this threatened their traditionally strong position in America.

The formation of the MPPC in late 1908, encouraged those European producers excluded from the pact to seek a similar arrangement in Europe to protect their interests. One of their major objectives was to tackle the perceived overproduction of films which were flooding the market, one manner in which was to cease the traditional practice of selling films outright and instead to rent them through distribution agencies for a limited period of time. This reduced the films in circulation.

Another move was an attempt to secure the rights to an exclusive deal with Eastman Kodak to supply raw film stock, and the date of the congress had been arranged so that George Eastman could attend. He was interested in becoming a monopoly supplier, similar to his deal with the MPPC in America. However this arrangement, which excluded any European producers not part of the Congress, was ruled to be illegal under French law. Similarly a move to create a single fixed price for films also eventually failed.

In April, a follow-up meeting was held in Paris at which the proposed Association was fatally undermined as Pathé, the world's biggest company and also one of the members of the MPPC through its Pathé Exchange subsidiary in America, chose to abandon the European Association. Pathé followed this up by an attempt to undercut the prices of its European rivals and drive them out of business.

Ultimately, increasing American domination of the American and then European film markets came about not from the MPPC cartel, but from a group of independent producers such as Fox Film, Universal Pictures, Paramount Pictures, Metro Pictures and First National.

== Bibliography ==
- Burrows, Jon. The British Cinema Boom, 1909–1914: A Commercial History. Springer, 2017.
- Thorsen, Isak. Nordisk Films Kompagni 1906–1924, Volume 5: The Rise and Fall of the Polar Bear. Indiana University Press, 2017.
