= Eleuterio Rodolfi =

Italian actor and director

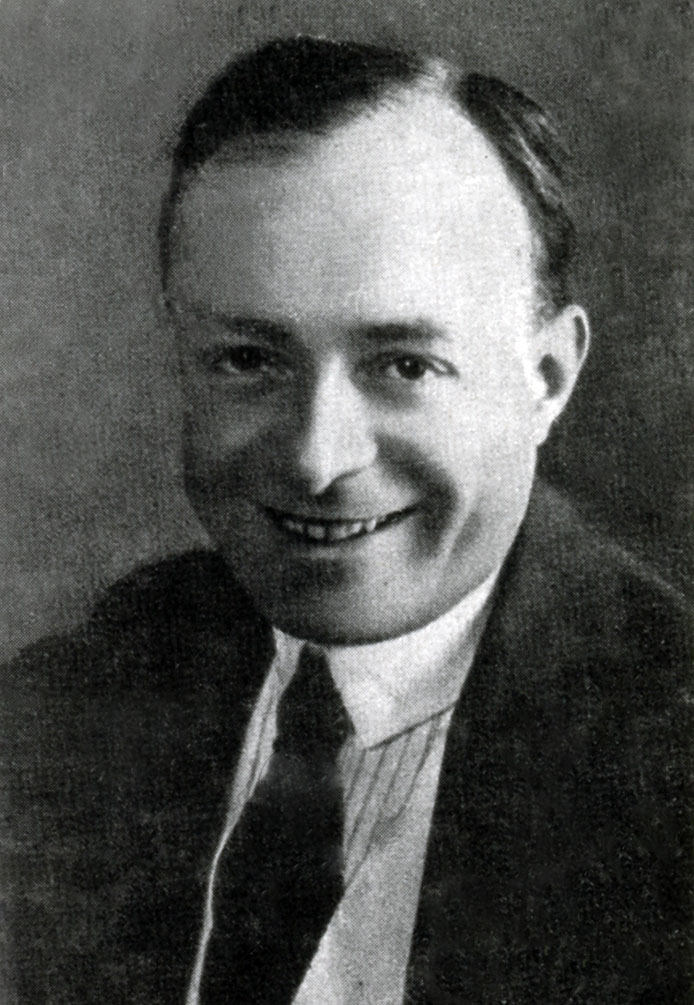
- Eleuterio Rodolfi in 1925
- Born: 28 January 1876; Bologna, Italy
- Died: 19 December 1933 (aged 57); Brescia, Italy
- Occupations: Director; Screenwriter; Actor
- Years active: 1911–1924
- Notable work: The Last Days of Pompeii

Eleuterio Rodolfi (28 January 1876 – 19 December 1933) was an Italian actor, screenwriter and film director. He was a leading figure in Italian cinema during the silent era, directing over a hundred films including The Last Days of Pompeii (1913).

== Biography ==
The son of the famous 19th-century Italian stage actor Giuseppe Rodolfi (1827–1885), he began his career as an extra in Francesco Garzes' theatre company before moving on to other important companies, including that of Ermete Novelli. There he met actress Adele Mosso, whom he married in 1895.

In 1911, he moved from theatre to film, joining the Turin-based company Ambrosio Film as a director and actor. For the Turin company, he appeared in 95 films, around eighty of which he directed and wrote himself. Besides several comedies starring Gigetta Morano, he directed the internationally successful historical epic The Last Days of Pompeii (1913). The film was a masterpiece of black-and-white cinematography. Featuring massive sets and utilising hundreds of extras, it demonstrated sophisticated cross-cutting techniques, making it a forerunner to later narrative features. At a time when other countries were still making films that were 20–30 minutes long, this feature-length production marked a huge step forward in the history of cinema and helped the Italian film industry to emerge on the world stage.

Over the next few years, Rodolfi directed the patriotic films Romanticismo (1915) and Val d'Orovi (1915), as well as a cinematic adaptation of Gabriele D'Annunzio's La fiaccola sotto il moggio (1916).

In 1917, Rodolfi moved to Jupiter Film, for whom he made seven films, of which only one (Ah! Le donne!) survives. He founded his own film company, Rodolfi Film, that same year. Following Ernesto Maria Pasquali's death in 1919, Rodolfi took over Pasquali Film, increasing production at the company that bore his name. He produced forty-one feature films between 1917 and 1922. Until recently, these films were considered lost and completely unknown, but several have recently been rediscovered in the Cinemateca Brasileira of São Paulo in Brazil.

Rodolfi continued his career as a film producer until 1923, when he returned to the stage. He retired in the late 1920s and spent the final years of his life in Brescia, where he owned and managed a cinema. Suffering from a grave illness, Rodolfi took his own life in 1933.

== Selected filmography ==
La meridiana del convento (1916)

=== Director ===
- The Last Days of Pompeii (1913)
- Doctor Antonio (1914)
- Hamlet (1917)
- The Little Schoolmistress (1919)
- Maciste's American Nephew (1924)

=== Producer ===
- The Painting of Osvaldo Mars (1921)

== Bibliography ==
- Everett, Wendy (2007). Questions of Colour in Cinema: From Paintbrush to Pixel. New York: Peter Lang. ISBN 978-3039113538.
