= The Last Days of Pompeii (1913 film) =

Ultimi giorni di Pompei, Gli
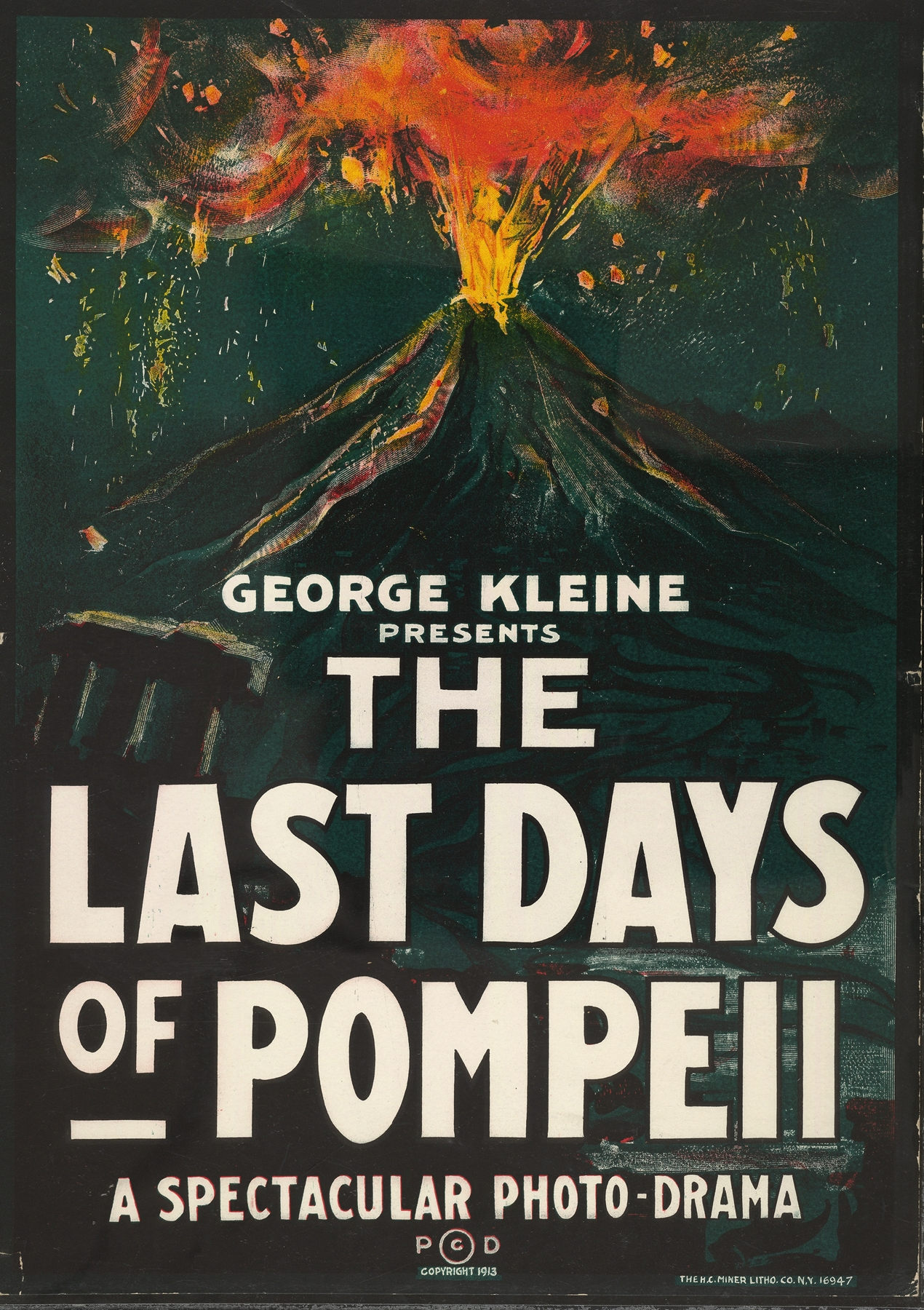
- Poster to the U.S. theatrical release of The Last Days of Pompeii
- Directed by: Eleuterio Rodolfi
- Written by: Arrigo Frusta
- Based on: The Last Days of Pompeii; 1834 novel by Edward Bulwer-Lytton
- Produced by: Arturo Ambrosio
- Starring: Fernanda Negri Pouget; Eugenia Tettoni Fior
- Cinematography: Giuseppe Paolo Vitrotti
- Music by: Palmer Clark
- Distributed by: George Kleine Amusements
- Release date: 24 August 1913
- Running time: 56 minutes (VHS); 88 minutes (Kino DVD)
- Country: Italy
- Language: Silent

The Last Days of Pompeii

Gli ultimi giorni di Pompei (English title: The Last Days of Pompeii) is a 1913 Italian black and white silent film directed by Eleuterio Rodolfi.

Based on Edward Bulwer-Lytton's 1834 novel of the same name, the film – one of two different adaptations of the same book in Italy that year – is set during the final days leading up to the Mount Vesuvius eruption in Pompeii in 79 AD.

== Plot ==
In Pompeii 79AD, Glaucus and Jone are in love with each other. Arbaces, the Egyptian High Priest, is determined to conquer her. Glaucus buys the blind slave Nydia who is mishandled by her owner.

Nydia falls in love with him and asks Arbaces for his help. He gives her a potion to make Glaucus fall in love with him. In fact it is a poison which will destroy his mind. Arbaces' disciple Apoecides threatens to reveal publicly his wrongdoings. Arbaces kills him and accuses Glaucus of the crime. He locks Nydia in a cellar to prevent her from speaking.

Glaucus is condemned to be thrown to the lions. Nydia manages to escape and tells Glaucus' friend Claudius what happened. Claudius rushes to the Circus to accuse Arbaces, and the crowd decides that Arbaces and not Glaucus should be thrown to the lions.

Then, Vesuvius starts erupting, and a widespread panic ensues. Under the shock, Glaucus recovers his mind. Blind Nydia, the only one to find her way in the darkness caused by the rain of ashes, leads Glaucus and Jone to safety and finds peace by drowning herself.

== Cast ==
- Fernanda Negri Pouget as Nydia
- Eugenia Tettoni Fior as Ione
- Ubaldo Stefani as Glaucus
- Antonio Grisanti as Arbaces
- Cesare Gani Carini as Apoecides
- Vitale Di Stefano as Claudius

== Production ==
The film was produced by Società Anonima Ambrosio. The DVD release by Kino wrongfully credits Pasquali for the production; however, Pasquali was the one producing the other 1913 version of Last Days of Pompeii.

The direction was done by Eleuterio Rodolfi. Mario Caserini is sometimes co-credited, but the grounds for this are uncertain: The Italian Bianco e Nero magazine mentions only Rodolfi.

== Distribution ==
The film was released in Italy on 24 August 1913, distributed by Giuseppe Barattolo. It was distributed in the US by the Kleine Optical Company under the name George Kleine Attractions.

The Last Days of Pompeii was the first film shown in the newly founded city of Tel Aviv, then in Ottoman Palestine. It inaugurated the Eden Cinema, the first one opened in Tel Aviv. (Reference in Morderchai Naor and Amit Levinson, "Who were the 66 Founders of Tel Aviv" מי היו 66 מייסדי תל אביב (in Hebrew), in "Early Tel Aviv, 1909-1934", תל אביב בראשיתה ed. Mordechai Naor, Published by Yad Yitzchak Ben Tzvi, Jerusalem, 1984).

Kino International released on DVD in November 2000 in an edition that was still in print as of 2025.
