= The Last Days of Pompeii (miniseries) =

1984 Italian-American television miniseries

- Based on: novel of the same name by Edward George Bulwer-Lytton
- Written by: Carmen Culver
- Directed by: Peter R. Hunt
- Starring: Ned Beatty; Brian Blessed; Ernest Borgnine; Olivia Hussey
- Music by: Trevor Jones
- Countries of origin: Italy; United Kingdom; United States
- Original language: English

Production
- Executive producer: David Gerber
- Producers: William Hill; Richard Irving
- Cinematography: Jack Cardiff
- Editors: Michael Ellis; Richard Marden
- Running time: 310 minutes
- Production companies: RAI Radiotelevisione Italiana; David Gerber Productions; Centerpoint; Columbia Pictures Television

Original release
- Network: ABC
- Release: May 6 – May 8, 1984

The Last Days of Pompeii is an Italian-American 1984 television miniseries filmed at Pinewood Studios and Italy. It was aired on ABC-TV and Rai, adapting the 1834 novel of the same name by Edward Bulwer-Lytton. It was the second English-language adaptation of the book for film or television (previously adapted mainly in Italian; the 1935 RKO film was unrelated to the novel and the 1900 adaptation by Walter R. Booth, while the first cinematic adaptation in English was a short film).

On June 5, 2012, Sony released the mini-series on DVD.

== Cast ==
Actor	Name	Description
Tony Anholt	Lepidus	A Roman noble; friend of Glaucus, Clodius and Sallust.
Ned Beatty	Diomed	A wealthy merchant; married to Lucretia and the father of Julia.
Joyce Blair	Lucretia	A wealthy Roman; married to Diomed and mother to Julia.
Brian Blessed	Olinthus	A blacksmith and devout Christian.
Ernest Borgnine	Marcus	A slave owner.
Peter Cellier	Calenus	A priest of Isis; brother to Burbo.
Nicholas Clay	Glaucus	A Greek noble; love interest to Ione.
George Claydon	Philos	A Greek dwarf artist.
Brian Coburn	Burbo	A tavern owner; brother of Calenus and married to Stratonice.
Francesca Romana Coluzzi	Stratonice	A brothel owner; married to Burbo
Brian Croucher	Melior	A gladiator.
Lesley-Anne Down	Chloe	A prostitute with a young son; in love with Petrus.
Christopher Ellison	Drusus	A Roman soldier.
Howard Goorney	Joseph	A Christian missionary.
Stephen Greif	Sporus	A gladiator.
Olivia Hussey	Ione	A soon to be priestess of Isis; sister of Antonius, and love interest to Glaucus.
Malcolm Jamieson	Petrus	A slave to Diomed; in love with Chloe.
Howard Lang	Medon	A slave to Diomed; father of Lydon.
Jill Melford	Lucinda	A Roman Noble.
Catriona MacColl	Julia	A wealthy Roman; the daughter of Diomed and Lucretia and love interest to Clodius.
Siobhán McKenna	Fortunata	A Roman noble; married to Gaius.
Franco Nero	Arbaces	The Egyptian High Priest of the Cult of Isis.
Laurence Olivier	Gaius	A former senator from Rome; married to Fortunata.
Linda Purl	Nydia	A blind slave; love interest to Lydon.
Anthony Quayle	Quintus	The head Magistrate of Pompeii.
Michael Quill	Catus	An assistant to Olinthus; a child
Duncan Regehr	Lydon	A gladiator and former slave; love interest to Nydia.
David Robb	Sallust	A Roman noble; friend of Glaucus, Clodius and Lepidus.
Barry Stokes	Gar	A Germanic gladiator.
Gerry Sundquist	Clodius	A poor Roman noble and poet; love interest to Julia.
Benedict Taylor	Antonius	A priest of Isis; brother of Ione.
Marilu Tolo	Xenia	A prostitute; Calenus is a regular client of hers.
