= Pietro Cossa =

Italian dramatist (1830–1881)

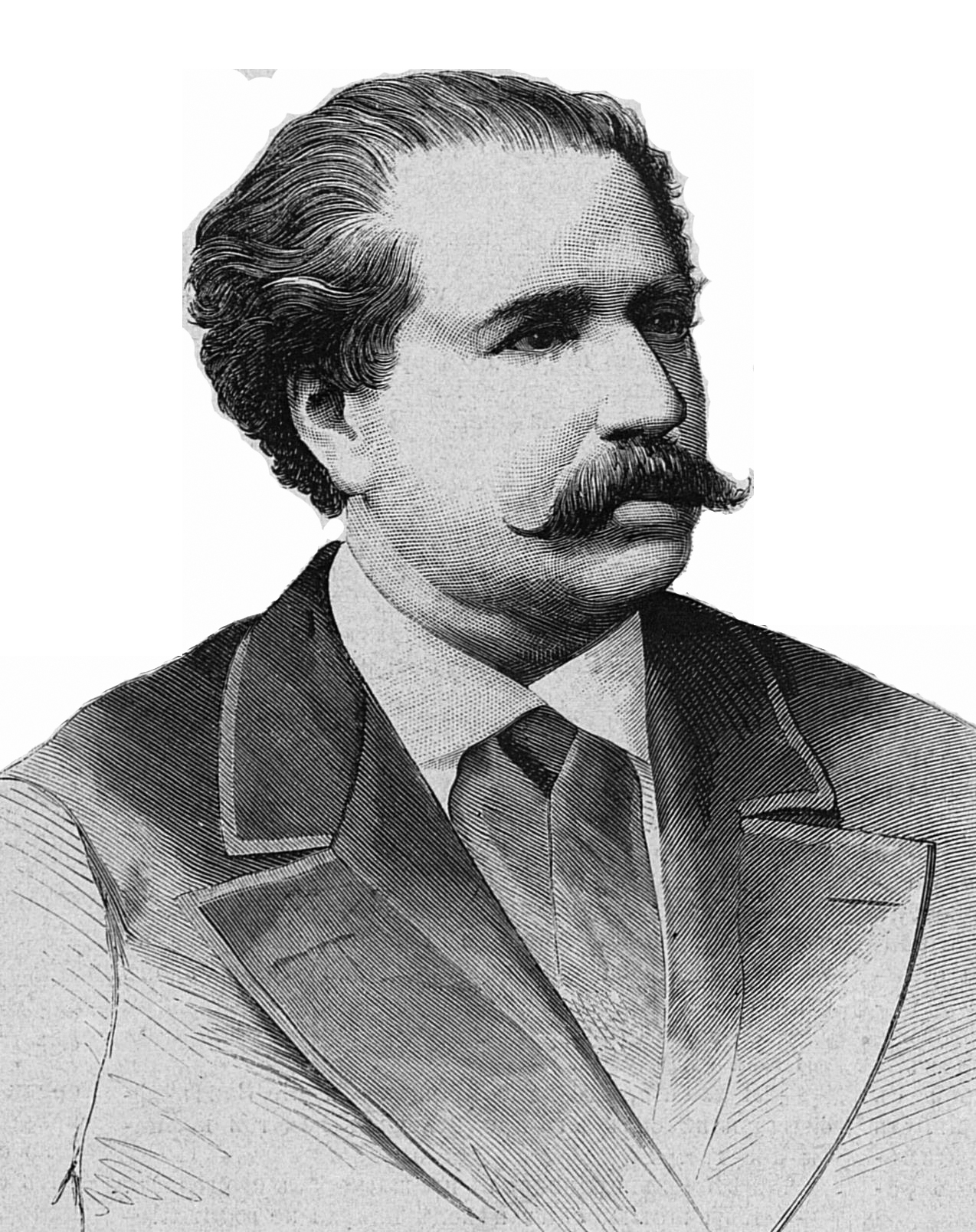
Pietro Cossa.

Pietro Cossa (25 January 1830 – 30 August 1881) was an Italian dramatist.

== Life ==
Cossa was born at Rome, and claimed descent from the family of Antipope John XXIII.

He manifested an independent spirit from his youth, and was expelled from a Jesuit school on the double charge of indocility and patriotism. After fighting for the Roman Republic in 1849, he emigrated to South America. However, failing to establish himself he returned to Italy, and lived precariously as a literary man until 1870, when his reputation was established by the unexpected success of his first acted tragedy, Nero.

From this time to his death Cossa continued to produce a play a year, usually upon some classical subject. Cleopatra, Messalina, Julian, enjoyed great popularity, and his dramas on subjects derived from Italian history, Rienzi and The Borgias, were also successful. Plautus, a comedy, was preferred by the author himself, and is more original. Incidental music for some of his plays was written by celebrated Italian composers, notably Luigi Mancinelli.

The entry for Cossa in the 1911 Encyclopedia Britannica evaluated his style as follows:

Cossa had neither the divination which would have enabled him to reconstruct the ancient world, nor the imagination which would have enabled him to idealize it. But he was an energetic writer, never tame or languid, and at the same time able to command the attention of an audience without recourse to melodramatic artifice; while his sonorous verse, if scarcely able to support the ordeal of the closet, is sufficiently near to poetry for the purposes of the stage.

Cossa died at Livorno in 1881. His collected Teatro poetico was published in 1887.
