= The Last Days of Pompeii (1908 film) =

- Directed by: Arturo Ambrosio; Luigi Maggi
- Written by: Roberto Omegna
- Based on: The Last Days of Pompeii; 1834 novel by Edward Bulwer-Lytton
- Produced by: Arturo Ambrosio
- Starring: Luigi Maggi; Lydia De Roberti; Umberto Mozzato
- Cinematography: Roberto Omegna; Giovanni Vitrotti
- Production company: Ambrosio Film
- Distributed by: Ambrosio Film
- Release date: December 1908
- Running time: 17 minutes
- Country: Italy
- Languages: Silent; Italian intertitles

The Last Days of Pompeii (Italian: Gli ultimi giorni di Pompeii) is a 1908 Italian silent historical film directed by Arturo Ambrosio and Luigi Maggi and starring Lydia De Roberti and Umberto Mozzato. It was loosely based on the novel of the same title by Edward Bulwer-Lytton. The film was a success on its release, and its popularity is credited with starting a fashion for epic historical films.

The film was made by the Turin-based Ambrosio Film.

== Plot ==
In Pompeii 79AD, Glaucus and Jone are in love with each other. Arbaces, the Egyptian High Priest, is determined to conquer her. Glaucus buys the blind slave Nydia who is mishandled by her owner.

Nydia falls in love with Glaucus and asks Arbaces for his help. He gives her a potion to make Glaucus fall in love with her. In fact it is a poison which will destroy his mind. Ione's brother Apaecides threatens to reveal publicly his wrongdoings. Arbaces kills him and accuses Glaucus of the crime. He locks Nydia in a cellar to prevent her from speaking.

Glaucus is condemned to be thrown to the lions. Nydia manages to escape and rushes to the Circus where she arrives just as the Vesuvius starts erupting.

A widespread panic ensues and under the shock, Glaucus recovers his mind. Blind Nydia, the only one to find her way in the darkness caused by the rain of ashes, leads Glaucus and Jone to safety and finds peace by drowning herself.

== Cast ==
- Luigi Maggi as Arbace
- Lydia De Roberti as Nidia
- Umberto Mozzato as Glauco
- Ernesto Vaser as Il padrone di Nidia
- Mirra Principi
- Cesare Gani Carini

== Bibliography ==
- Brunetta, Gian Piero. The History of Italian Cinema: A Guide to Italian Film from Its Origins to the Twenty-first Century. Princeton University Press, 2009.
- Moliterno, Gino (2009). The A to Z of Italian Cinema. Lanham, Maryland: Scarecrow Press. ISBN 978-0810870598.
