= Arturo Ambrosio =

Italian film director and film producer

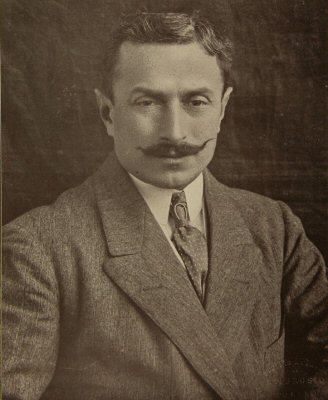
- Ambrosio in 1913
- Born: 3 December 1870; Turin, Piedmont; Italy
- Died: 25 March 1960 (aged 89); Pancalieri, Piedmont; Italy
- Occupations: Producer director
- Years active: 1904–1943

Arturo Ambrosio (1870–1960) was an Italian film producer who was a pioneering and influential figure in the early years of Italian cinema.

== Biography ==
Ambrosio was a photographer who owned a shop in Turin. In 1904, after returning from a visit to Paris with a new film camera he began making short films of a documentary nature. In 1906 he founded Ambrosio Films and began making more ambitious fiction films.

In 1908 Ambrosio produced and directed The Last Days of Pompeii, a major hit which helped trigger a fashion for Italian historical epics, generally set in the Classical era. Over the next decade Ambrosio oversaw a number of popular films and was able to export them to lucrative foreign markets such as Britain and America.

Like other Italian filmmakers, Ambrosio struggled during the crisis that hit Italian filmmaking following the First World War and his career appeared to have been ended by the commercial failure of his 1924 epic Quo Vadis. However, he returned from retirement to head production at Scalera Films between 1939 and 1943.

== Selected filmography ==
- The Last Days of Pompeii (1908)
- Nero or The Fall of Rome (1909)
- Doctor Antonio (1914 )
- Monna Vanna (1915)
- Cenere (1916)
- Mara West (1921)
- Theodora (1921)
- The Ship (1921)
- Quo Vadis (1924)

== Bibliography ==
- Moliterno, Gino (2009). The A to Z of Italian Cinema. Lanham, Maryland: Scarecrow Press. ISBN 978-0810870598.
