= Luigi Ceccarelli =

Italian composer

- Born: April 20, 1953 (age 72); Rimini, Italy
- Genres: Film score; classical
- Occupations: Composer; orchestrator
- Instruments: Piano

Luigi Ceccarelli (born 20 April 1953 in Rimini, Italy) is an Italian composer.

== Biography ==
Luigi Ceccarelli completed his musical studies in the ‘70s at the Gioachino Rossini Conservatory of Pesaro (Italy), where he studied Electronic Music and Composition with Walter Branchi, Giuliano Zosi and Guido Baggiani. His career as a composer began in 1975, and was strongly influenced by digital technology and research into Sound Spatialisation. In addition to his exclusively musical work, right from the start, he dedicated a significant part of his professional activity to experimental theatre, contemporary dance, cinema and visual arts.

After moving to Rome in 1978, he began to collaborate with the Gruppo di lavoro intercodice - ALTRO (inter-codex work-group), an artistic association led by the painter Achille Perilli, and during this period, his contacts with artists in various other disciplines allowed him to develop forms of music that were closely related to the visual arts and the theatre. With ALTRO, he wrote and performed the music for the performance Abominable A, which was staged at the Palazzo delle Esposizioni in Rome. In 1981, ALTRO became a dance company with the name of AltroTeatro and, with the choreographer Lucia Latour, Ceccarelli wrote and performed the music for the group's performances until 1994. These included the show Anihccam dedicated to the Futurist artist Fortunato Depero and staged at the Centre Georges Pompidou in Paris, which launched Ceccarelli's international career.

In 1994, he made the radio-film (a story told only with sounds and music) La Guerra dei Dischi (The War of the Records), which was commissioned by Rai Radio 3 and based on a text by Stefano Benni. This was the beginning of Ceccarelli's research into the relationship between music and recited texts, which led the composer to create a series of radio plays and audio plays for Rai Radio 3.

In 1996 his work Birds for bass clarinet and birdsong was awarded the first prize in the competition of the IMEB (Institut international de musique électroacoustique de Bourges - France). This institution then invited Ceccarelli to work in Bourges and commissioned various electroacoustic works from him, including De Zarb à Daf for Iranian percussion instruments.

At the end of the ‘90s Ceccarelli founded Edison Studio together with the composers Alessandro Cipriani, Mauro Cardi and Fabio Cifariello Ciardi with whom he created various soundtracks for silent movies from the second and third decades of the 20th century. These soundtracks, performed live by the composers themselves during screenings of the films, have included those for four particularly important films: The Last Days of Pompeii, The Cabinet of Dr. Caligari, Blackmail and Inferno. The DVDs with the soundtracks of Inferno realized by Edison Studio were released in 2011 by the Cineteca di Bologna (in the series Cinema ritrovato). Ceccarelli's particular interest in the relationship between music and film have led him to carry out intensive studies on contemporary cinema and in 2007 he published an article on Stanley Kubrick's Eyes Wide Shut.

Starting from 2000, he realised a series of compositions for musical theatre and site-specific art installations for the Ravenna Festival, including In Die Resurrectionis, for the Basilica of San Vitale (Ravenna) and Bianco Nero Piano Forte, in collaboration with the photographers Lelli & Masotti and the writer Mara Cantoni, which was located in the Biblioteca Classense.

Also beginning in 2000 Ceccarelli began an artistic collaboration with the Teatro delle Albe, culminating with two works of musical theater, L’isola di Alcina (The Island of Alcina) and Ouverture Alcina, with a text by Nevio Spadoni in Romagnol dialect. These two creations were staged in Italy, as well as in several European cities (Paris, Berlin, Moscow) and in New York. Another work of musical theatre that Ceccarelli realised in the same period was the Requiem staged by the theatre company Fanny & Alexander and performed for the first time at the Ravenna Festival in 2001. For these works he received the Italian Theater Critics Award of the Premio UBU (an award where the jury consists of the reviewers in the most important Italian newspapers and magazines) in 2002 (which on that occasion was awarded to a musician for the first time), as well as the prize of Belgrade International Theatre Festival (Serbia) and that of the MESS International Theatre Festival of Sarajevo.

During this period, Ceccarelli continued to compose music for dance performances, and he composed the music for Live* with the Norwegian dance company Wee/Francesco Scavetta. From 2009 to 2011 he worked with the South African choreographer Robyn Orlin and in collaboration with Alessandro Cipriani he created the music for several dance performances including Have you hugged kissed and respected your brown Venus today?, which was staged at the Théâtre de la Ville in Paris and the Grand Théâtre de Luxembourg.

In 2012, Ceccarelli met the double-bass player Daniel Roccato, and with him, he established an improvisational duo with the double-bass as a source for the electronic processing of sound in real time. In 2013 he returned to composing for the cinema and with Alessandro Cipriani he made the music for the film by Michel Comte The Girl from Nagasaki, a reworking of Puccini's opera Madame Butterfly set in the '60s, which premiered at the Sundance Film Festival in 2014.

Luigi Ceccarelli's works have been released on CD by RaiTrade, CNI, Luca Sossella Editore, Edipan, BMG-Ariola, Newtone Gmeb / UNESCO / Cime and the Venice Biennale. Since 1979, he has been the head professor of Electronic Music Composition at the Conservatory of Perugia.

== Catalogue of main works ==
=== Musical theatre ===
- Ouverture Alcina (2004/2009) - text Nevio Spadoni, directed by Marco Martinelli
- +/- (2009) - directed by Luigi De Angelis-Fanny & Alexander
- Tupac Amaru, la deconquista, il Pachacuti (1997/2007) - on a text by Gianni Toti
- La Mano, de profundis rock (2005) – on a text by Luca Doninelli, directed by Marco Martinelli
- Francesca da Rimini (2004) – on a text by Nevio Spadoni, directed by Elena Bucci
- Galla Placidia (2003) – on a text by Nevio Spadoni, directed by Elena Bucci
- Requiem (2001) - directed by Luigi de Angelis
- L’isola di Alcina (2000) – on a text by Nevio Spadoni, directed by Marco Martinelli
- Esercizi di Patologia (1995/1997) – on a text by Valerio Magrelli
- Macchine Virtuose (1993/1994) – a staged concert by Gianfranco Lucchino
- Isla Coco (1985/1987) - with ElectraVox Ensemble.
- music for Abominable A (1979) – with "Altro, gruppo di lavoro intercodice"

=== Electroacoustic music ===
- X-Traces (2011/2013) - with Daniele Roccato - for double bass and live electronics
- Il contatore di nuvole (2012) – for piano and samples of prepared piano
- I luoghi comuni non sono segnati sulle carte - with Edison Studio, on a text by Marco Martinelli
- Armonia dell’ascendente (2011) - with the Tibetan monks of the Drepung Loseling monastery
- Cadenza (2011) – acousmatic music
- Birds (1995/2011) – for bass clarinet, samples of bass clarinet and birdsongs
- Quattro pezzi su poesie di Giovanni Pascoli (2003/2007): Notte d’Inverno, nella Nebbia, l’Uccellino del Freddo, le Rane – for reciting voice and elaborated sounds, text from four poems by Giovanni Pascoli
- Neuromante (1991/2007) - for alto sax and elaborated sounds of sax
- Quanti (1991/2007) - for clarinet and elaborated sounds of clarinets
- Anima di Metallo (1990/2007) - for three percussionists and elaborated sounds of percussion
- Exsultet (1996/2007) - for choir of gregorian chant and electronic elaboration
- Cadenza esplosa (2006) - acousmatic piece
- Inferi (2001) - for reciting voice and elaborated sounds, on a text by Mara Cantoni
- In die resurrectionis (1999) - for choir of gregorian chant and electronic elaboration
- Respiri (1999) - for french horn and elaborated samples of horn
- A propos de la chambre a coucher de Philippe II dans l’église de l’Escorial (1998) - for reciting voices and elaborated sounds, on a text by Valerio Magrelli
- De zarb a daf (1996) - for zarb, daf, and sampled sounds of zarb and daf
- Aracne (1996) - for reciting voices and elaborated sounds, on a text by Guido Barbieri
- Luce-ombra (from Anihccam),(1995) - for string quartet and samples of strings
- Aleph con zero (1993/1994) - for two pianos, two marimbas and sampled sounds
- Discussione del 3000 (from Anihccam) (1992) - for two percussionists and sampled sounds of voice
- Aura in visibile (1991/1992) - for flute, piano and vibrating exciters
- Etaoin shrdlu (1985) - for Double bass and live electronics - with Marcello Federici
- Titanic & Icarus spa (1984) - for amplified cymbals and tam-tams, and vibrating exciters
- Incontro con Rama (1982) - for trombone and live electronics
- Koramachine (1981) - for violin with ringmodulator and seven amplified instruments
- Il contingente cambia colore (1975) – for magnetic tape

=== Soundtracks for cinema ===
- music for The Girl from Nagasaki (2013) - with Alessandro Cipriani – a film by Michel Comte (2013) editions M4 Films
- music for Blackmail (2013) - with Edison Studio – a film by Alfred Hitchcock (1929)
- music for Inferno (2008) - with Edison Studio – a film by Francesco Bertolini e Adolfo Padovan (1911)
- music for Das Cabinet des Dr. Caligari (2003) – with Edison Studio – a film by Robert Wiene (1919)
- music for Gli Ultimi Giorni di Pompei (2001) – with Edison Studio – a film by Eleuterio Ridolfi (1913)
- music for Opus II (1997) – a film by Walter Ruttmann (1921)
- music for Filmstudie (1997) – a film by Hans Richter (1926)

=== Audiovisual works and installations ===
- Pic (2009/2011)) – video
- Bianco Nero Piano Forte (2000/2009) – installation - prose and verses by Mara Cantoni, images by Lelli & Masotti

=== Works for radio ===
- music for La Commedia della Vanità (1998) – by Elias Canetti, adapted and directed by Giorgio Pressburgher
- I Viaggi in Tasca, 20 luoghi mentali (1995) – on twenty texts by Valerio Magrelli
- La Guerra dei Dischi (1994) – on a text by Stefano Benni

=== Music for dance ===
- music for … Have you hugged, kissed and respected your brown Venus today? (2011) – with Alessandro Cipriani – choreography by Robyn Orlin
- Strangely Enough (2010) – with Daniele Roccato and Wee Company – choreography by Francesco Scavetta
- music for With astonishment I note the dog (revisited) (2009) – with Alessandro Cipriani – choreography by Robyn Orlin
- Hey dude, let’s stick around a bit longer this time (2005/2008) – choreography by Francesco Scavetta
- music for A Glimpse of Hope (2008) – choreography by Simone Sandroni, Lenka Flory
- music for Margine Buio (2007) – choreography by Simone Sandroni, Lenka Flory
- Live* (2002) – choreography by Francesco Scavetta
- music for Tre Soli Italiani (2000) – three choreographies by Francesco Scavetta, Monica Francia and Antonio Montanile
- Naturalmente Tua (1992) – choreography by Lucia Latour
- Anihccam, (1989) – choreography by Lucia Latour
- On y Tombe on n’y Tombe (1988) – with Luca Spagnoletti – choreography by Lucia Latour
- Frilli Troupe (1986) – con Luca Spagnoletti – choreography by Lucia Latour
- La Lu La (1984) – choreography by Lucia Latour
- Spatium Teca (1982) – choreography by Lucia Latour
- Porte à Faux, (1981) – choreography by Lucia Latour

== Main CD and DVD ==
=== Monographic CD ===
- La Mano (2006)– Luca Sossella editions ISBN 88-89829-04-4
- Exsultet (2005) – Rai Trade editions RTC006
- L’isola di Alcina (2000) – Ravenna Teatro editions CD 01/00
- Macchine Virtuose (1996) - Edipan editions CCD 3062
- La guerra dei Dischi/Naturalmente Tua (1995) – Edipan editions CCD 3054
- Anihccam (1992) – BMG-Ariola editions CCD 3005

=== CD and DVD with Edison Studio ===
- Inferno (2011) – DVD Il Cinema Ritrovato editions – Cineteca di Bologna
- Edison Studio (2007) – DVD Auditorium editions EdiLDC278 1139/40
- Zarbing (2005) – CD edition La Frontiera LFDL 18401 – RaiTrade editions RTP00902005

== Bibliography ==
- AA.VV., item "Luigi Ceccarelli", in Dizionario Enciclopedico Universale della Musica e dei Musicisti, edited by Alberto Basso, Volume appendice 2005, UTET, Torino, 2004, p. 111, ISBN 88-02-06216-1.
- AA.VV., item "Anihccam", in Dizionario Enciclopedico Universale della Musica e dei Musicisti, edited by Alberto Basso, Volume I titoli e i personaggi, UTET, Torino, 1999, p. 85, ISBN 88-02-05345-6.
