= Mauro Cardi =

Italian composer

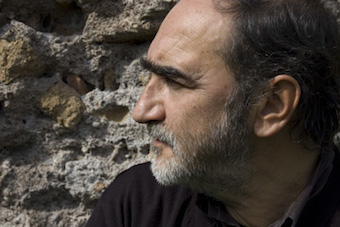
Mauro Cardi

Mauro Cardi (born July 22, 1955, in Rome, Italy) is an Italian composer.

== Biography ==
Trained at the "Santa Cecilia" Conservatoire of Rome, under the guidance of Irma Ravinale, Gino Marinuzzi jr., Guido Turchi, he graduated in composition, instrumentation for wind orchestra and choral music. In 1982, he received his first international recognition, winning the "Valentino Bucchi Prize" with Melos, for soprano and orchestra. Crucial was the encounter with Franco Donatoni, with which he furthered his education at the Accademia Nazionale di Santa Cecilia and the Accademia Musicale Chigiana of Siena. In 1984, he attended the Darmstädter Ferienkurse. In the same year his composition Les Masques, Quattro Bagatelle for flute viola and guitar, was awarded the prestigious Gaudeamus Prize in Amsterdam. In 1987, he was selected to represent Italy at the International Rostrum of Composers by UNESCO. In 1988, he won the second prize at the International Competition Gian Francesco Malipiero with In Corde, for orchestra. He composed also several works commissioned by institutions and associations such as: RAI, Accademia Nazionale di Santa Cecilia, Biennale di Venezia, Ravenna Festival, Ville de Genève, Fondazione Malipiero, Centro Studi Armando Gentilucci, Maggio Musicale Fiorentino, Nuova Consonanza.

While his early works have been influenced by Donatoni, to which he devoted also an extensive analytical study, Mauro Cardi soon developed his individual style, focusing his research on "musical forms moulded by timbre and sound intuitions, with unexpectedly expressive moments". His poetics reflects his natural aptitude to contrapuntal writing and his fascination with logic and the symbolic value of numbers, attracted to the playful dimension involved in composing.

He composed two radio operas commissioned by RAI: in 1994 Temperatura esterna on a text by Michele Mari and, in 1996, La mia puntualità fu un capolavoro on a text by Marco Lodoli. In 1995, on a commission by the Accademia Filarmonica Romana, he composed his first opera, Nessuna Coincidenza, one-act stage action with music. In 1998 BMG Ricordi published the monographic CD Manao Tupupau, containing his major works of the 1990th. From 2000 to 2008, on a commission of the 52nd Biennale di Venezia, he composed Oggetto d'amore, a cycle of seven musical scenes on texts by Pasquale Panella, premiered in Venezia and published in CD format by RAI Trade in 2009, which concludes his long collaboration with Sonia Bergamasco and the Freon Ensemble. In 2019 Mauro Cardi returns to musical theater with Il Diario di Eva, a semi-scenic opera for dancer / actress, soprano and ensemble, on a text freely taken from the homonymous story by Mark Twain (GAMO International Festival, Certosa di Firenze) and in 2021 he composed, on a libretto by Guido Barbieri, the one-act and six chapters opera Le ossa di Cartesio, for actor, three singers and large ensemble, commissioned by Opera InCanto, performed in Terni and Rome for Nuova Consonanza.

Since the 1990s, he has been involved in electroacoustic and computer music, collaborating with the electroacoustic music centres Agon in Milan, Centro Ricerche Musicali in Rome, Istituto Gramma in L'Aquila. In 1995 was chosen by IRCAM for the international stage, in 1997 Manao Tupupao has been selected as a finalist at the 24th Electroacustique Music Competition of Bourges, and in 2009 Alba, for zarb and electronics, was chosen by the International Computer Music Conference of Belfast. In 2001, he joined the composers collective Edison Studio in Rome, one of the most active centres for production of electroacoustic music in Italy, with which he experimented a collective composing practice. In 2008, Edison Studio published its first DVD, resulting from the collaboration with the video makers Latini and Di Domenico. In the following years it realized the live soundtracks for the silent movies: Gli ultimi giorni di Pompei (1913) by Eleuterio Rodolfi, Ricatto (Blackmail, 1929) by Alfred Hitchcock, Inferno (1911) by Francesco Bertolini, Giuseppe de Liguoro e Adolfo Padovan (awarded the "Premio speciale AITS per il migliore suono anno 2011"‚ by the Associazione Italiana Tecnici del Suono), Das Cabinet des Dr. Caligari (1919) by Robert Wiene. In 2011 and 2016 these two soundtracks have been published on DVD in 5.1 surround version by the Cineteca di Bologna in the "Il Cinema ritrovato" series. A study has been published on Edison Studio's works: "Il silent film e l'elettronica in relazione intermediale", edited by Marco Maria Gazzano. With Edison Studio, Mauro Cardi participated in the International Computer Music Conference 2002 (Gothenburg) and 2003 (Singapore).

Since 2021 Mauro Cardi has been on the executive committee of Nuova Consonanza from 1988, of which he has been President from 1999 to 2001. Founding member of the "Scuola popolare di musica di Testaccio" (Rome), he has taught Composition at the Conservatories of L'Aquila and Florence and from 2021 at the Conservatory “Santa Cecilia” in Rome. He gives seminars and composition workshops in Italy and abroad.

Mauro Cardi's compositions have been published by: Casa Ricordi, RAI Trade, Curci, Edipan, Ut Orpheus, Semar, Sconfinarte, Taukay; and have been recorded by the labels: Ricordi, RCA, BMG Ariola, Nuova Fonit Cetra, RAI Trade, Edipan, Adda Records, Happy New Ears, Il manifesto, CNI, Taukay.

== Works ==
=== Musical theatre and movies ===
- 2021 Le ossa di Cartesio, for actor, three singers and large ensemble, libretto by Giulio Barbieri
- 2019 Il Diario di Eva, for female dancer/actress, soprano and ensemble, libretto by composer and Cristina Papi, based on Mark Twain's story of the same name
- 2014 En dirigeable sur le champs de bataille, live computer soundtrack for the BBC's documentary of the same name, with Edison Studio
- 2013 Blackmail, live computer soundtrack for the 1929 movie of the same name by Alfred Hitchcock, with Edison Studio
- 2008 Oggetto d'amore, for female voice, ensemble, video and electronics, on texts by Pasquale Panella
- 2008 Inferno, live computer soundtrack for the movie of the same name by F.Bertolini, G.De Liguoro e A.Padovano, with Edison Studio
- 2008 Medea incontra Norma, based loosely on Medea of Luigi Cherubini and Norma of Vincenzo Bellini, with Luigi Ceccarelli, ideazione e regia di Cristina Mazzavillani Muti
- 2004 Trash, "musicalopera" for actors, singers and electronics, on texts by Francesca Angeli, music co-author: Roberta Vacca
- 2003 Das cabinet des Dr.Caligari, live computer soundtrack for the movie of the same name by, with Edison Studio
- 2001 Gli ultimi giorni di Pompei, live computer soundtrack pfor the movie of the same name by, with Edison Studio
- 2000 C'era una volta... la principessa dispettosa, on text by Nicoletta Costa, for narrator and electronics, music co-authors: Maria Cristina De Amicis, Michelangelo Lupone, Alessandro Sbordoni, Roberta Vacca
- 1995 Nessuna Coincidenza, one-act stage action with music, for 2 sopranos, tenore/narrator, actor, ensemble, tape and live electronics

=== Radio dramas ===
- 1996 La mia puntualità fu un capolavoro, 20 radiofilm, for 2 narrators and tape, on texts by Marco Lodoli
- 1994 Temperatura esterna, for narrator, flutes, percussions, MIDI and electronics, on texts by Michele Mari

=== Orchestra ===
- 2019 Sinfonia (après Haydn 104), for orchestra
- 2008 Stanza 19, for narrator and orchestra, on texts by Jorge Luis Borges
- 2001 Hallelujah, for soli, choir and orchestra
- 2000 Timordime, for narrator and orchestra, on texts by Pier Paolo Pasolini
- 1999 Spleen, for piano and orchestra
- 1997 Lisbon revisited, for narrator and orchestra, on texts by Fernando Pessoa
- 1989 Arcipelaghi, for orchestra
- 1983–85 In corde, for orchestra
- 1982 Melos, for soprano and orchestra

=== Wind orchestra ===
- 2011 Parafrasi L (après Liszt), for piano and symphonic band
- 2004 Eikon, for large wind orchestra and electronics
- 1995 A Poison Pen, for electric guitar, soli and wind orchestra

=== Chamber music ===
- 2020 Toy (Piano) Stories, Games #4, for Toy Piano and obbligato flute
- 2019 Quanto pesa una lacrima?, for female voice, violin, guitar, double bass and percussion, on "A inventare i numer" from "Favole al telefono" by Gianni Rodari
- 2018 Miroir, for six percussionists and two marimbas
- 2018 Arethusa, for narrator, soprano and ensemble, on texts by Ovid
- 2017 R.Bow, for two electric guitar and bass guitar
- 2017 La Follia, for viola (and viola d'amore) and string orchestra
- 2017 Berceuse, for flute, guitar, viola and cello
- 2016 QO, Games #2, for piccolo quartet
- 2016 ES, for flute and piano
- 2015 Stelutis, for ensemble of 15 instruments
- 2015 Item, for two flutists
- 2014 Zone 2.0, for sax alto and electronics
- 2014 Zone, for sax contralto
- 2014 Il vento, dopo l'ultimo treno, extract from "Badenheim 1939″ by Aharon Appelfeld, for narrator and ensemble
- 2013 Asa nisi masa, for narrator and ensemble
- 2013 Bazzle!, Games #1, for piano four-hands
- 2012 I luoghi comuni non-sono segnati sulle carte, for horn, violin, double bass, piano, recorded voices, dancers and live electronics, music co-authors: Luigi Ceccarelli, Fabio Cifariello Ciardi
- 2012 Venenum, for cello and piano
- 2011 Pastelli sul Pack 2, for flutes and live electronics
- 2011 Timordime 2, for ensemble
- 2011 Arabesque, for flute (piccolo, G flute), oboe and piano
- 2010 Bagatella, for guitar
- 2009 Tellus 6.3, for eight strings and four percussionists
- 2009 Due pezzi futuristi, for baritone, oboe and accordion
- 2008 Breamptu, for accordion and guitar
- 2007 Non si parla che d'aria, from the cycle Oggetto d'amore, for narrator, trumpet, percussions, double bass, on texts by Pasquale Panella
- 2007 Noi siamo la materia che sussulta, from the cycle Oggetto d'amore, for narrator, trumpet, electric guitar, percussions, double bass and electronics on texts by Pasquale Panella
- 2007 Un gioco a incastro, from the cycle Oggetto d'amore, for vocalist, trumpet, electric guitar, percussions, double bass and electronics on texts by Pasquale Panella
- 2007 Le Parole da sola, from the cycle Oggetto d'amore, for narrator, trumpet, electric guitar, percussions and double bass on texts by Pasquale Panella
- 2007 Caro cara, from the cycle Oggetto d'amore, for two narrators, tape and electronics on texts by Pasquale Panella
- 2007 Breath, for accordion and live electronics
- 2006 Sarastro, for flute, clarinet, violin and cello
- 2006 I Piatti della Bilancia, actress, tape and electronics, on a text by Rosaria Lo Russo
- 2006 Pastelli sul Pack, for flutes
- 2005 No sap chantar qui so non-di, for female voice and ensemble, on a text by Jaufré Rudel
- 2004 Souffle 1.2 (from Petrassi), for flute and ensemble
- 2004 Musica mundana, for narrator and plucked trio, on a text taken from De Institutione Musica of Severino Boezio
- 2003 Polvere di luna, for narrator and electronics, on texts by Sonia Bergamasco
- 2003 Child, for bass clarinet
- 2003 Fil, for bass clarinet
- 2003 Le parole e il sale, from the cycle Oggetto d'amore, for voice and electric guitar, on texts by Pasquale Panella
- 2002 Alba, for zarb and electronics
- 2002 Prima Sonata, for piano
- 2002 The Moving Moon, for coloratura soprano and strings on texts by Samuel T. Coleridge
- 2001 Su questa trama (per non-dire l'Otello), for narrator and ensemble, drama and libretto by Vittorio Sermonti
- 2001 Allegoria dell'isola, for soprano and harpsichord, on texts by Francesco Pennisi
- 2001 Klon, for trumpet, percussions and double bass
- 2000 Altrove con il suo nome, from the cycle Oggetto d'amore, for actress and electronics, on texts by Pasquale Panella
- 2000 Altre Geografie, for five instruments
- 2000 Impromptu, for guitar
- 2000 Il fondo dell'acqua è disseminato di stelle, for two pianos
- 1998 Das Papier, for soprano, baritone, string quartet and electronics, on texts by Wolfgang Amadeus Mozart
- 1998 ...plena timoris amor, for soprano and piano, on texts by Ovid
- 1998 Chat, for clarinet and cello
- 1998 Luz, for jazz trio and ensemble
- 1997 Levar, for ensemble
- 1997 Fil rouge, for piano and string trio
- 1996 Manao tupapau, for flute, percussions, tape and live electronics, finalist at the 24° Electroacustique Music Competition of Bourges
- 1996 Luna lunae..., for six instruments
- 1996 The Spark to the Flame, for seven instruments
- 1996 Fado, for six instruments
- 1995 Stream, for sax quartet
- 1995 Vocativo, for cello
- 1994 Nuages, for seven instruments
- 1993 E la notte rischiarava la notte, for three MIDI keyboards and live electronics
- 1993 Al di sopra del lago è il vento, for viola and piano
- 1992 Wind, for recorders and harp
- 1992 Horus, for three percussionists
- 1992 Fantasie, for string orchestra
- 1991 Lettura di un'onda, for viola and guitar
- 1991 Certo moto d'ignoto tormento, for piano and double quintet
- 1991 Das Alte Jahr Vergangen ist, for two harpsichords
- 1991 Gusci di mago, for string orchestra
- 1990 Calendari indiani, for female voice and ten instruments, on traditional texts by Native Americans
- 1990 Libra (vers.b), for vibraphone and tape
- 1990 Per il Teatro di Documenti, for clarinet
- 1990 Ottetto (après Stravinsky), for wind instruments
- 1989 Der Trank (ist's, der mir taugt!), for piano and six instruments
- 1989 Effetto Notte, for eight instruments
- 1988 Terza Texture, for flute, bass clarinet and piano
- 1987 Libra, for vibraphone
- 1987 Gotico, for harpsichord and string quartet
- 1987 Mizar, for double bass
- 1986 Promenade: Variazioni sul blu, for seven instruments, works premiered at the Tribuna Internazionale dei Compositori 1987
- 1986 Texture, for two guitars
- 1986 Myricae, for flute, cello and piano
- 1986 Silete Venti, for guitar and ensemble
- 1985 Bianco, for guitar
- 1985 Trama, for violin
- 1985 Volute, for wind quintet and piano
- 1984 Filigrana, for eight instruments, selected by International Gaudeamus MusicWeek 1986
- 1984 Trio (le claire sillage), for violin, cello and piano
- 1984 Quartetto per archi
- 1984 (rev. 1992) Sciarada, for clarinet, viola, cello and piano
- 1983 Natura morta, for piano
- 1983 Partita per nove, for nine instruments
- 1983 Les Masques: Quattro Capricci for flute, viola and guitar, International Gaudeamus Preize 1984
- 1982 R.I.B.E.S., for female voice
- 1982 Aube, for guitar

=== A cappella choir ===
- 1992 M'al vento ne portava le parole, for vocal quartet on a text by Francesco Petrarca

=== Transcriptions ===
- 1998 Il fanciullo e gli incantesimi, transcription from L'Enfant et les Sortileges of Maurice Ravel, for narrator, choir and ensemble, co-authors: Giulio Castagnoli, Matteo D'Amico
- 2000 Canoni 1–5, transcription from L'offerta musicale, Canoni enigmatici, of Johann Sebastian Bach, for ensemble, co-authors: Giulio Castagnoli, Gabriele Manca

== Discography ==
=== Dvd with edison studio ===
- 2016 Das Cabinet des Dr.Caligari, a movie by Robert Wiene (1920), DVD Cineteca di Bologna 2016, "Il cinema ritrovato", DVD-Booklet, soundtrack by Edison Studio
- 2011 Inferno, by Francesco Bertolini, Adolfo Padovan and Giuseppe De Liguoro (1911), DVD Cineteca di Bologna 2011, "Il cinema ritrovato", DVD-Booklet, soundtrack by Edison Studio
- 2007 Altrove con il suo nome, video by Silvia di Domenico and Giulio Latini, in "Edison Studio" (2007) – DVD Auditorium EdiLDC278 1139/40, co-production Edison Studio – Cemat

=== Monographic cd ===
- 2009 Oggetto d'amore, seven musical scenes for voices, instruments, video and electronics, Sonia Bergamasco, voice, Freon ensemble, on texts by Pasquale Panella, RTC023 – 2009 – RAI Trade
- 1998 Manao Tupapau, CMRCD1053, Ricordi Oggi – BMG Ricordi

=== Works included in cd ===
- 2017 Pastelli sul Pack, in "Fabula ut", Stradivarius STR 37067, Arcadio Baracchi, flutes
- 2017 Arabesque, in "New music for flute, oboe and piano", Edizioni Taukay 162, Ecoensemble Trio
- 2014 Bagatella, in "Paganini 2013 – Ghiribizzi", Edizioni Sinfonica A – 337, Luigi Attademo, guitar
- 2010 Breath, Edizioni Curci Milano E.C. 11695, Francesco Gesualdi, accordion, Mauro Cardi, elettronics
- 2009 Pastelli sul Pack, Edizioni Curci Milano E.C. 11667, Arcadio Baracchi, flutes
- 2008 Melos, in "Dedicated to Pierrot", Puncta PNCD 0308, Joan Logue, soprano, Orchestra Sinfonica della RAI di Roma, cond. D.Shallon
- 2006 Klon, in "Italian News", RAI Trade RTC 012, Freon Ensemble
- 2006 Alba, in "Zarbing", Edizioni LaFrontiera (LFDL 19401) e Rai Trade (RTP0090), Mahamad Ghavi-Helm, zarb
- 2005 Polvere di luna, Armando Curcio Editore & Eurografica, Sonia Bergamasco, voice
- 2005 Child, in "Suono Sonda N.3 – Giugno 2004", Rocco Parisi, bass clarinet
- 2001 Vocativo, in "Musica per la Resistenza 1995", Rocco Parisi, bass clarinet
- 1996 The Spark to the Flame, in "Scuola popolare di Musica di Testaccio – Musica per la Libertà", Il Manifesto CD 004, Freon ensemble
- 1994 Al di sopra del lago è il vento, in "Musica Presente 4 – CDC 503", 1994 Nuova Fonit Cetra – Dischi Ricordi, Ensemble Contrechamps
- 1993 Wind, in "'900 Musica – 74321 16229-2", 1993 BMG Ariola, Alterego ensemble
- 1992 Effetto notte, in "Garden of earthly desire", CRMCD 1020 1992 Dischi Ricordi, Elision ensemble, conductor Sandro Gorli
- 1991 Aube, PAN CDC 3009 1990 CD Edipan, Stefano Cardi, guitar
- 1990 Volute, in "L'Artisanat furieux ensemble", PAN CDC 3010 1990 CD Edipan, L'Artisanat Furieux Ensemble, conductor Tonino Battista
- 1989 Filigrana, in "Musique Transalpines vol.2 ", CCS 590014 1990 – Centre de Crèation Sonore, Adda Records, Gruppo strumentale Musica d'oggi, conductor Fabio Maestri
- 1989 Terza Texture, in "Musica nuova in Italia", CD Happy New Ears 2 – CA 911, Het Trio

=== Works included in lp ===
- 1987 Texture, Bianco in "Contempolinea Due – La chitarra ", SP 10098 1987 Disco RCA, Duo Chitarristico Romano, Stefano Cardi, guitar
- 1986 Trio (le claire sillage), in "1986 La Musica – n.12 – LM 86-2", 1986 Dischi Edipan, Nuove Forme Sonore ensemble

== Bibliography ==
- Issues on Mauro Cardi
  - "Cardi, Mauro", in AA.VV., Dizionario Enciclopedico della Musica e dei Musicisti, diretto da Alberto Basso, volume Appendice; Utet, Torino, 1990, ISBN 978-88-02-04396-8, p. 14
  - "Cardi, Mauro", in AA.VV., Dizionario Enciclopedico della Musica e dei Musicisti, diretto da Alberto Basso, volume Appendice 2005; Utet, Torino, 2004, ISBN 978-88-02-06216-7, p. 105
  - "Cardi, Mauro", in AA.VV., Enciclopedia della musica Garzanti, Milano, 1996, ISBN 978-88-11-50467-2, p. 141
  - "Cardi, Mauro", in AA.VV., International Who's who in Music, 12.a ed.1990; AAVV., consultant editor David Cummings, IBC Cambridge, ISBN 978-0-948875-20-5, p. 120
  - "Cardi, Mauro", in AA.VV., Enciclopedia della Musica, diretta da Marco Drago e Andrea Boroli, Istituto Geografico De Agostini, Novara, 1995, ISBN 978-88-415-2055-0, p. 184
  - "Cardi, Mauro", in AA.VV., Autoanalisi dei compositori italiani contemporanei, vol.I, a cura di Alberta Cataldi, Flavio Pagano, Napoli, 1992, ISBN 978-88-85228-16-0, pp. 148–152
  - Marco Maria Gazzano (a cura di), con scritti di G.Barbieri, R.Calabretto, S.Miceli e altri, Edison Studio. Il Silent Film e l'Elettronica in Relazione Intermediale, Exorma, Roma, 2014, ISBN 978-88-95688-89-3
  - Carlo Boschi, "Presence of Romantic Elements in the Work of Contemporary Italian Composers", in Romanticism as an Attitude. Actes du séminaire organisé dans le cadre du projet européen Roads of Romanticism, Strasbourg, Èditions du Conservatoire 2007, ISBN 978-2-9515197-8-7, pp. 35–50
  - Renzo Cresti, Verso il 2000, Dick Peerson, Napoli-Pisa, 1990, pp. 34–35
  - Renzo Cresti, Mauro Cardi, Scrittura e artigianato, in Musica presente. Tendenze e compositori di oggi, LIM, Lucca, 2019, ISBN 978-88-5543-001-2, pp.174-178
  - Luca Conti, "Mauro Cardi: l'artigianato del comporre", in Idea, Anno XXVI, N.6–7, Roma, Giugno-Luglio 1990, pp. 33–39
- Issues by Mauro Cardi
  - "Il computer per il compositore: slave o master? Su alcune risorse, e le conseguenti problematiche, che pongono le nuove tecnologie applicate alla composizione musicale", in Musica/Tecnologia, n.4 – 2010, Firenze University Press, ISSN 1974-0042, pp. 63–67
  - "Condividere la tela. Il live cinema di Edison Studio per Inferno", (con Ceccarelli L., Cifariello Ciardi F., Cipriani A.,), in Le arti del suono n.3/2010, Edizioni Orizzonti Meridionali, Napoli, 2010, OCLC 706856436, pp. 103–123
  - "Atono conforta grandi. Uno studio su Argot di Franco Donatoni e di alcune problematiche della composizione algoritmica" (in due parti), in Suono Sonda, Anno 4, N° 7, Febbraio 2009, Anno 4, N° 8, Novembre 2009, Joker, Genova, 2009
  - "Nuove tecnologie e composizione collettiva per il cinema muto", (con Ceccarelli L., Cifariello Ciardi F., Cipriani A.), in Close Up, Anno X, N°18, Marzo-Giugno 2006, Kaplan, Torino, 2006, ISBN 978-88-89908-01-3, pp. 81–102
  - "Notazione e pensiero musicale", in Progetto Grafico, Anno 4, N°7, Gennaio 2006, Associazione italiana progettazione per la comunicazione visiva, Roma, 2006, pp. 27–29
  - "Collective composition: the case of Edison Studio", (con Ceccarelli L., Cifariello Ciardi F., Cipriani A.), in Organised Sound 9/3, Cambridge University Press, 2004, pp. 261–270
  - "Child", in Suono Sonda, Anno 2, N° 1, Giugno 2004, Genova, 2004, pp. 25–33
  - "Il live electronics", (con Ceccarelli L.), in Il complesso di Elettra, Cidim, Roma, 1995, ISBN 978-88-85765-05-4, pp. 49–52
  - "Il grado Xerox della cultura", in Suonosud, N° 22, Autunno 1994, Ismez, Roma, 1994, pp. 20–26
