= The Girl from Nagasaki =

- Film poster
- Directed by: Michel Comte
- Written by: Michel Comte; Anne-Marie Mackay
- Produced by: Michel Comte; Ayako Yoshida; Amy Filbeck
- Starring: Mariko Wordell; Edoardo Ponti; Christopher Lee; Michael Wincott; Michael Nyqvist; Polina Semionova; Ayako Yoshida
- Cinematography: Pierluigi Malavasi
- Edited by: Nick Tamburri
- Music by: Luigi Ceccarelli; Alessandro Cipriani
- Production companies: M4 Films AG; Shotz Fiction Film
- Release date: November 9, 2013 (Naples International Film Festival)
- Running time: 107 minutes
- Countries: Italy; Germany; Japan; United States
- Languages: English; Japanese

The Girl from Nagasaki is a 2013 romantic musical drama film directed by Michel Comte. The film had its premiere as the closing night film of the 2013 Naples International Film Festival on November 9, 2013. The film later screened at the 2014 Sundance Film Festival on January 18, 2014.

== Plot ==
The film is a reworking of Puccini's opera Madama Butterfly, in which the tragic heroine is obsessed with an American pilot.

== Cast ==
- Mariko Wordell as Cho-Cho San
- Edoardo Ponti as Officer Pinkerton
- Christopher Lee as Old Officer Pinkerton
- Michael Wincott as Goro
- Michael Nyqvist as Father Lars
- Polina Semionova as Cho-Cho San's Alter Ego
- Ayako Yoshida as Suzuki
- Robert Evans as U.S. Consul
- Clemens Schick as Prince Yamadori
- Nobu Matsuhisa as Cho-Cho San's father
- Lisa Zane as Jazz singer
- Sasha Alexander as Adelaide

== Reception ==
The Girl from Nagasaki received mixed reviews from critics. Marshall Fine in his review for Huffington Post said that the "staging is avant-garde, bloody and surreal, with elements of modern dance, classical tableaux, kabuki and opera, as well as conventional melodrama. Comte returns often to that staged version to emphasize the action or outline it in a more symbolic way." While, Dan Schindel in his review for Movie Mezzanine said that it "Feels like every derisive joke about art house cinema brought to unironic life."
