= Edison Studio =

Musicians' collective in Rome

Edison Studio is a collective of composers and an electroacoustic music ensemble. It was founded in Rome in 1993 by the composers Mauro Cardi, Luigi Ceccarelli, Fabio Cifariello Ciardi e Alessandro Cipriani.

Since more than 30 years Edison Studio is active in the electroacoustic music scene, thanks to the awards and prizes it has received for its compositions (International Computer Music Conference1993–1995, 1997, 1999–2003, 2008, Concours International de Musique Electroacoustique de Bourges 1996–1998, Main Prize Musica Nova 1996, Prague, Prix Ars Electronica 1997, 1998, etc.). Edison Studio has realized music productions for Venice Biennale (2000 and 2001), Ravenna Festival (1999, 2000, 2004, 2008, 2016, 2017), RomaEuropa Festival 2016, 2017, Moscow Autumn Festival 2012, REDCAT Disney/California Institute of the Arts Theater Los Angeles 2005, etc.

Among Edison Studio's productions: Zarbing CD, published by CNI Unite, featuring the Persian percussionist Mahammad Ghavi-Helm and the live cinema concerts for the following silent films: The Last Days of Pompeii, Blackmail by Alfred Hitchcock, Metropolis (1927 film) by Fritz Lang, En dirigeable sur le Champs de Bataille, L'Inferno, The Cabinet of Dr. Caligari by Robert Wiene and Battleship Potemkin by Sergei Eisenstein. The latter 3 soundtracks have been published on DVD by Cineteca di Bologna, in 2011, 2016 and 2017 in 5.1 surround sound and Stereophonic sound versions in Il Cinema Ritrovato series. The soundtracks by Edison Studio for silent films involve voices and environmental sounds in the music. Their sonic re-interpretations of those silent cinema masterpieces attracted the attention of several cinema experts such as Sergio Miceli and Giulio Latini and other university professors who wrote articles included in the book Edison Studio, il silent film e l'elettronica in relazione intermediale about the soundtracks by Edison Studio, which was published by Exorma with the support of the Roma Tre University. Edison Studio's soundtrack for The Cabinet of Dr. Caligari has had excellent reviews, including the one by David Kim-Boyle in the Computer Music Journal (MIT Press) about the world premiere of this piece at the International Computer Music Conference 2003 at the National University of Singapore.

== Discography ==
- Zarbing, Mahammad Ghavi Helm, zarb, daf, CNI – La Frontiera – RAI Trade (RTP0090)
- Edison Studio (DVD), video works by Giulio Latini and Silvia Di Domenico Auditorium Edizioni
- Inferno DVD with Edison Studio soundtrack for the namesake silent film by Francesco Bertolini, Adolfo Padovan, Giuseppe De Liguoro; Cineteca di Bologna DVD, L'immagine Ritrovata series CR/10
- Das Cabinet des Dr. Caligari DVD with Edison Studio soundtrack for the namesake silent film by Robert Wiene; DVD Cineteca di Bologna, L'Immagine Ritrovata series CR/19
- Battleship Potemkin DVD with Edison Studio (featuring Vincenzo Core) soundtrack for the namesake silent film by Sergei Eisenstein; DVD Cineteca di Bologna, collana L'Immagine Ritrovata CR/25
