= Paul Killiam =

Entertainer, film historian, and film collector (1916–1998)

Paul Killiam (September 12, 1916 – November 12, 1998) was an entertainer, film historian, and film collector. He provided comedic narration at showings of silent films including as host on his own television show. He was a pioneer in film preservation and the reintroduction of old films to the viewing public during the television era. He amassed a large and valuable collection of films. It was sold to various buyers after his death.

Killiam hosted Hometown TV, which debuted on WOR-TV on November 17, 1952. From off-camera he narrated old films and other material.

In 1954 he produced a 15 minute TV series through Sterling Television called "The Movie Museum" and showed one-reel silent short subjects.

He performed on The Steve Allen Show delivering a comedic monologue about his film company and then delivering contemporary narration over silent film footage from a film about cave dweller era relations. He hosted the Paul Killiam Show which featured a similar format of comedic introduction followed by ridiculous narration of old films including from Thomas Alva Edison's Edison Studio.

In 1959 he started working with home movie distributor Blackhawk Films to bring silent films and highlights of noted features to the 8mm and 16mm home movie market, sometimes adding his own annotations. In 1960 he produced a half-hour TV series called "Silents Please" which showed highlights of silent features and comedy shorts, sometimes hosted by Ernie Kovacs. In 1961 he co-produced with Saul Turell "The Legend Of Rudolph Valentino" about Rudolph Valentino for Wolper-Sterling Films.

He hosted the show Hour of Silents.

He worked as a consultant for Hollywood documentaries "Hollywood: The Golden Years"(1961) "Hollywood: The Great Stars" (1963) and "The Horror Of It All" (1983)

In 1977 he Executive Produced for PBS "The Men Of Bronze" about the WW I all-black 369th Infantry Regt. The "Harlem Hellfighters". It was later distributed by his Killiam Shows theatrical distribution company.

His film company lost a suit over the film rights to The Son of the Sheik.

In 1983, the New York Times reported on his activities.

An orchestra purchased some of the films in his collection.

== See also ==
- Ben Model
