= L'Inferno =

1911 film by Francesco Bertolini, Giuseppe de Liguoro and Adolfo Padovan

- Directed by: Francesco Bertolini; Adolfo Padovan; Giuseppe De Liguoro
- Based on: The Divine Comedy by Dante Alighieri
- Starring: Salvatore Papa; Arturo Pirovano; Giuseppe de Liguoro; Augusto Milla
- Cinematography: Emilio Roncarolo
- Music by: Raffaele Caravaglios
- Production company: Milano Films
- Distributed by: Helios
- Release date: 10 March 1911
- Running time: 65 minutes
- Country: Italy
- Language: Silent
- Budget: >ITL€100,000

L'Inferno (transl. The Hell) is a 1911 Italian silent film, loosely adapted from Inferno, the first canticle of Dante Alighieri's Divine Comedy. L'Inferno took over three years to make, and was the first full-length Italian feature film. It is also one of the first films to be shown in its entirety in the United States.

== Plot ==
L'Inferno (with Italian intertitles)

Dante is barred from entering the hill of salvation by three beasts that block his path (Avarice, Pride, and Lust). Beatrice descends from above and asks the poet Virgil to guide Dante through the Nine Circles of Hell. Virgil leads Dante to a cave where they find the river Acheron, over which Charon ferries the souls of the dead into Hell. They also see the three-headed Cerberus and Geryon, a flying serpent with a man's face. They see the Devil eating human beings whole, harpies eating the corpses of suicides, an evil man forced to carry his own severed head for eternity, people half-buried in flaming lava, etc.

There follows a series of encounters in which the two meet up with a number of formerly famous historical figures whose souls were in Limbo or Hell, and they listen to some of their tales told in flashback. These characters include Homer, Horace, Ovid, Lucanus, Cleopatra, Dido, the traitor Caiphus, Count Ugolino, Peter of Vigna, Francesca Da Rimini and her lover Paulo, Brutus and Cassius, Mohammed, and Helen of Troy. The film's main attraction is the fantastic set designs depicting the horrors of Hell, with excessive violence and gore, designed to frighten the audience into becoming pious or God-fearing.

== Cast ==
- Salvatore Papa as Dante Alighieri
- Arturo Pirovano as Virgilio
- Giuseppe de Liguoro as Il conte Ugolino
- Augusto Milla as Lucifer
- Attilio Motta
- Emilise Beretta as Beatrice

== Production ==
L'Inferno's depictions of Hell closely followed those in the engravings of Gustave Doré for an edition of the Divine Comedy, which were familiar to an international audience, and employed several special effects.

As Dante's Divine Comedy places Muhammad in hell, the film also has a momentary unflattering depiction of Muhammad in its Hell sequence (his chest explodes, exposing his entrails).

Nancy Mitford recorded seeing the film in Italy in 1922, referring to it as Dante. She records that it lasted from 9 until 12:15 including two intermissions. She details many of the deaths and tortures from the film. Her description of the film in her letter home is quoted during the biography Nancy Mitford by Harold Acton.

The scenes from Hell from the film were reused in an American 1936 exploitation film, Hell-O-Vision and the 1944 race film Go Down, Death!. Some American state film censor boards required removal of the hell sequences from L'Inferno used in Go Down, Death!, such as one where a woman's bare breast is momentarily seen.

== Release ==
Dante's Inferno, English language version.

L'Inferno was first screened in Naples in the Teatro Mercadante on March 10, 1911. An international success, it grossed more than $2 million in the United States, where its length gave theater owners an excuse for raising ticket prices.

== Home video ==
For many years, L'Inferno was largely unseen and only available in lower quality, incomplete copies.

- In 2004, a newly restored version of the film, combining British and American prints from the BFI National Archive and the Library of Congress, was released on UK DVD by the Snapper Music label. It was scored by father and son Edgar and Jerome Froese, of the German electronic band Tangerine Dream. The film has English intertitles and subtitles in German, French, Spanish, and Italian.
- In 2011, L'Inferno's centenary, a brand new and more complete digital restoration by Italy's Cineteca di Bologna was released on their own DVD label. This version has original Italian intertitles, optional English subtitles, and a choice of an electro-acoustic score by Edison Studio or a composition for piano by Marco Dalpane. It also has many extras, including some restored early Italian shorts and a bilingual paperback book.
- In December 2023, Terror Vision Records & Video announced a release of the film on Blu-ray, featuring a new 4K restoration, three new scores created specifically for the release (by American singer-songwriter HALEY, American organist and composer Michael Kiker and Belgian pianist, composer and musical professor Laurent Pigeolet, respectively) and a commentary track by film historian James L. Neibaur. The release also includes a red tint version of the film by Redwood Creek, English intertitles and a booklet with an essay by Ben Model.

== See also ==
- Depictions of Muhammad
- Nudity in film
- Inauguration of the Pleasure Dome, a 1954 film by Kenneth Anger that utilizes footage from L'Inferno
