= Alessandro Cipriani =

Italian composer of electronic music

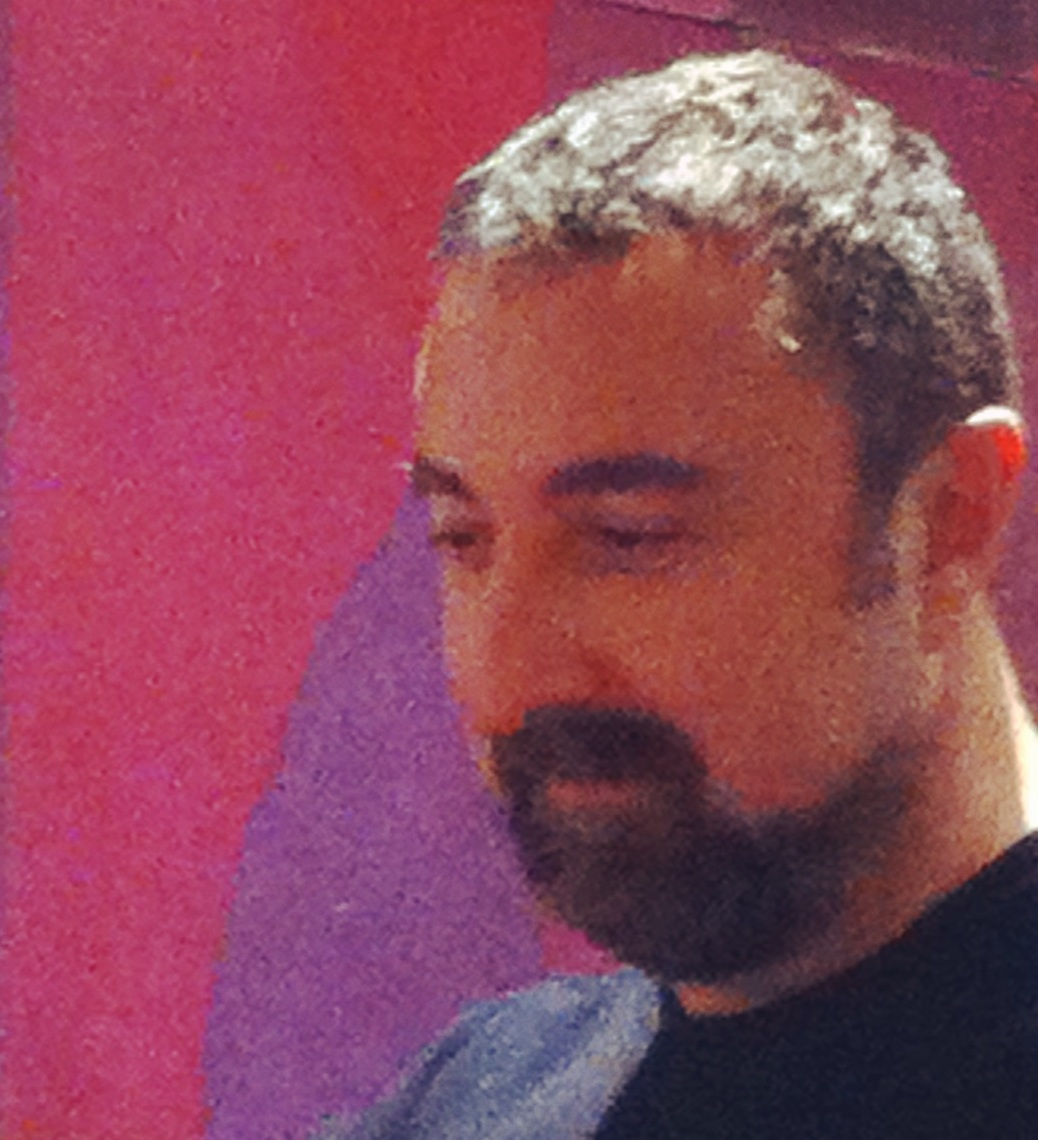
Alessandro Cipriani

Alessandro Cipriani (born April 28, 1959) is an Italian composer of electronic music.

== Biography ==
Cipriani was born in Tivoli, Italy. After ordinary musical studies Alessandro Cipriani completed his studies in composition and electronic music at the Conservatorio di Santa Cecilia in Rome. He created a number of pieces involving instrumental music with electronic processing, including a string quartet and magnetic tape, entitled "Quadro", and a 60-minute work for piano, percussions and magnetic tape, "Il Pensiero Magmatico" (Magmatic Thought) written in collaboration with Stefano Taglietti. Cipriani then became interested in establishing concrete connections with the music of cultures that are dissimilar to the classical and contemporary western tradition.

A fundamental piece by Cipriani in this context is the trilogy concerning Islamic, Jewish and Gregorian religious chants, composed by the author from 2001 to 2007 in various stereo, quadraphonic and 5.1 versions, both acousmatic and live. In these works Cipriani re-elaborates some traditional chants of these three monotheistic religions, while maintaining a strong connection between the original voice, its comprehensibility and its electronic processing. The three pieces are "Al Nur (The Light)", based on an Islamic chant, "Mimaa'Makim", based on a Jewish chant, and "Aqua Sapientiae/Angelus Domini".

Alessandro Cipriani's collaborations with musicians from various different cultures have led him to reflect on the relationship between local cultures and global culture in relation to electroacoustic music. These reflections were documented in a special issue of the magazine "Organised Sound", edited by Cipriani and they were followed by further collaborations with musicians representing various cultures such as the Sami singer Tuuni Lansman, the Iranian percussionist Mahammad Ghavi-Helm, the Chinese musicians Song Fei and Fan Wei Qing, the Berber performer Nour Eddine Fatty., the South African performers Ann Masina and Dudu Yende, the Ghanaian actress Dorothée Munyaneza, the Korean singer Min Ji Kim, and the Japanese singer Matsutoyo Sato (in the soundtrack of the movie "The Girl from Nagasaki" directed by Michel Comte, which was selected for the 2014 Sundance Film Festival in the "New Frontier" section.)

One of Alessandro Cipriani's most intense collaborations was with the visual artist Alba D' Urbano. Following their meeting, in the eighties, a number of audiovisual works were produced, including 4 videos, 4 video-installations with sound and "Rosa Binaria: Memories", an interactive sound installation on sixteen channels, which was shown at the Leopold-Hoesch-Museum of Düren (Germany).

After a period during which he concentrated on making soundtracks for various documentaries and videos by Giulio Latini and Silvia Di Domenico, in 2001 Cipriani began a long collaboration with the composers of Edison Studio, which led to a variety of collective compositions, in particular the soundtracks of The Last Days of Pompeii, Blackmail by Alfred Hitchcock, Metropolis (1927 film) by Fritz Lang, En Dirigeable sur le Champs de Bataille, L'Inferno, The Cabinet of Dr. Caligari by Robert Wiene and Battleship Potemkin by Sergei Eisenstein. The latter 3 soundtracks have been published on DVD by Cineteca di Bologna, in 2011, 2016 and 2017 in 5.1 surround sound and Stereophonic sound versions in Il Cinema Ritrovato series.

In 2022, Manfredi Edizioni published an art book dedicated to the audiovisual work "Shipwrecks Naufragi" by Alessandro Cipriani and Giulio Latini. The book has been edited by Valentino Catricalà in dual languages (Italian and English). It contains two interviews with Cipriani and Latini and various articles by art critics and musicologists. In 2023 Cipriani and Latini, in collaboration with Alessandro Sbordoni created a multiscreen concert-installation in surround 5.1 titled "Memoria d'Utopie" (Memory of Utopias) first screened at the 60th Nuova Consonanza Festival on 8 December 2023.

== Educational publications ==
Alessandro Cipriani's publications in the field of the teaching of electronic music are of international interest, in particular the textbook "Virtual Sound" written in collaboration with R. Bianchini. His research in the field of education then led him to collaborate with Maurizio Giri. This collaboration resulted in a textbook on sound synthesis and signal processing (based on the Max software) "Electronic Music and Sound Design" Vol.1, Vol.2., and Vol. 3 These textbooks are English translations of the Italian texts "Musica Elettronica e Sound Design" Vol.1, vol.2, and Vol. 3

== Bibliography ==
- AA.VV., Dizionario Enciclopedico Universale della Musica e dei Musicisti, edited by Alberto Basso, Volume appendice 2005, UTET, Torino, 2004 ISBN 88-02-06216-1
- Cipriani, A., "Editorial" in Organised Sound, volume 13, n.2, pp. 85–88 Cambridge University Press, doi:10.1017/S1355771808000113
- Cipriani, A. and Latini, G., "Global/Local Issues in Electroacoustic Music for the Cinema of the Real: A case study" in Organised Sound, Volume 13, n.2, pp. 89–96, Cambridge University Press, doi:10.1017/S1355771808000125
- Catricalà, V., ed. Shipwrecks Naufragi, Manfredi Edizioni, Imola, 2022, ISBN 9791280049377
