= Alba D'Urbano =

Italian artist and professor

Alba D'Urbano (born April 13, 1955) is a textile and video artist.

D'Urbano's most notable work was 1995's "hautnah" (close to the skin); a series of garments imprinted with life-size digital photographs of her own skin. After an exhibition in 1999, critics stated she depicted nudity as fashionable, provoked voyeurism, and made skin (the external body) just another interface in a world. In addition to her own work, D'Urbano has been a critic and an art philosopher. Since 1995, D'Urbano has been a professor at Hochschule für Grafik und Buchkunst, in Leipzig, Germany.

== Early life ==
D'Urbano was born in Tivoli and studied philosophy at the Sapienza University of Rome from 1974 to 1978. Her work as an artist was influenced by her affiliation with the 'Distracted Avantgarde' (Klemens Gruber), which sought to bring about a paradigm shift in the relationship between art, politics and mass communication. It was against this backdrop that Alba D'Urbano produced experimental radio programmes for the alternative broadcasting station Radio Gulliver in Tivoli (modelled on stations such as Radio Alice in Bologna and Radio Città Futura in Rome) and founded a feminist group.

In 1979, she enrolled in a course of visual arts studies at the Accademia di Belle Arti in Rome under Enzo Brunori, graduating in 1983. Experimental works in collaboration with other artists date from that period. One such fellow artist was composer Alessandro Cipriani with whom she created performances, Super-8 films, and artistic events in public spaces.

Alba D'Urbano moved to (West) Berlin in 1984 and began her studies in visual communication at the Berlin University of the Arts in 1985. In 1989, she graduated as a master student (Meisterschüler-Degree) in experimental film design under Wolfgang Ramsbott. In 1990 she held a scholarship at the Institute for New Media (INM) in Frankfurt am Main, headed by Peter Weibel. It was during that time that she met her future husband, Nicolas Reichelt.

After a lectureship at the Offenbach University of Art and Design (HfG), she was appointed to teach at the Academy of Visual Arts Leipzig in 1995, where she has since held a professorship in computer graphics, and has taught the class for intermedia since 1998. In 2003–2004, she taught at the Free University of Bozen-Bolzano for one academic year. Since 2000, she has curated numerous exhibitions at the national and international level as part of her university duties, addressing political and social issues and incorporating both process-orientated and media-reflective methods.

== Artistry ==
In the 1980s, Alba D'Urbano's artistic interest focused on the drastic changes in the perception of reality brought about by the increasingly influential glut of virtual images, which are generated by the mass media and susceptible to manipulation. At the core of her artistic exploration was the relationship between the written word and the new media. Berlin's urban space with its partly truncated communication paths and its insular status provided the setting for her first video works from the series Nur die Augen können (filmed at Checkpoint Charlie, 1985) and Kreis, der (filmed on Ernst-Reuter-Platz, 1987). For the video installations for the series Berlin Kulturstadt Europas, she focused on local communication media; in the series of paintings entitled Prometheus she addressed the impoverished human communications and the loss of writing.

In the 1990s, Alba D'Urbano turned to "interactive video and computer installations, to which her creative, complex, experimentally enhancing and problem-conscious approach gave significant impetus as a means of artistic impression". In her projects, some of which featured a multiplicity of media (e.g. L'esposizione impraticabile, 1992, '96; Rosa Binaria, 1993–96; Hautnah and Il sarto immortale, 1995–98) she raised the viewer's awareness of mass media and their 'problematic nature without polemic and without affecting the aesthetic evocative force of various media' [Fußnote 2, Künstlerlexikon].

In a bid to counter an overwhelming array of media images, she began to toy with the viewer's expectations. She substituted images with illegible strings of characters and drew the viewer's attention towards the way in which media images are created and the processes they involve. She gained international renown through her multi-part projects Hautnah and Il Sarto Immortale, in which she digitally processed images of her own body and then had them printed onto fabric and transformed into items of clothing to be showcased by models on catwalks. In the interplay between clothing and nakedness, she literally exposed the commercial exploitation of women's bodies in the mass media and the fashion industry.

The works she developed jointly with Tina Bara are inspired by feminist standpoints: there, the body is portrayed as a matrix inscribed into which are identities as a cultural and social construct. For the two women artists, it is always about the process of allocating normative attitudes and behaviour patterns. In a series of intermedia projects such as Portrait Alba / Tina Ritratto and Bellissima the artists also referenced biographical material. A new added element incorporated by Tina Bara is the subject of the German Democratic Republic's past. The series of portraits entitled Siegerehrungen (2003) for instance features former elite GDR athletes. The project Covergirl: Wespen-Akte (2007-2009) looks at the opposition group Frauen für den Frieden, of which Tina Bara is also a member.

== Works in public collections (selected) ==
- Gutenberg-Museum, Mainz
- Collection of the City of Frankfurt am Main
- Collection of the Town of Fellbach
- Deutsche Gesellschaft für Wertpapiere (DWS), Frankfurt am Main
- Dresdner Bank, Munich
- Collection of the Contemporary Art Gallery in Termoli, Italy (Galleria Civica d'Arte Contemporanea)
- Deutsche Bank, Darmstadt
- ZKM | Medienmuseum, Karlsruhe
- Medienhaus, Frankfurt am Main
- Deutsche Guggenheim, Berlin
- Art Fund of the Free State of Saxony, Dresden
- Kunsthalle Dominikanerkirche, Osnabrück
- Museum für Kunst und Gewerbe Hamburg
- Museum Bellerive, Zurich

== Prizes and scholarships / awards ==
- 1987 Grant from the editors of Das kleine Fernsehspiel (ZDF) for the realization of the video Kreis, der
- NaFög-grant of the Universität der Künste, Berlin
- Project grant of the Röhm GmbH, Darmstadt
- 1990 Grant Pépinières of Eurocréation, Paris
- 2006 Project grant of the Kulturstiftung des Bundes for Eine Frage (nach) der Geste
- 2009 Project grant of the Stiftung Kunstfonds for Covergirl: Wespen-Akte

== Publications ==
- D’Urbano, Alba: La Porta. In: Il recinto e il luogo sacro (exhibition catalogue), Sora 1990.
- D’Urbano, Alba: Al Caro Scomparso. In: Videoinstallationen (exhibition catalogue), Berlin 1991.
- D’Urbano, Alba: Rosa Binaria. In: Gerbel, Karl; Weibel, Peter (ed.): Ars Electronica 1993, Vienna 1993.
- D’Urbano, Alba: Der negierte Raum. In: Gerbel, Karl; Weibel, Peter (ed.): Ars Electronica 1994, Linz 1994.
- D’Urbano, Alba: Hautnah. In: Kunstforum International, Kunstforumverlag Ruppichteroth 1995; also in Fotografie nach der Fotografie, Verlag der Kunst, Munich 1995.
- D’Urbano, Alba: Stoffwechsel. In: Reindl; Dietzler; Ummels; Broch (Hg.): Art Hansa Spezial, (exhibition catalogue), Salon Verlag, Cologne 1997.
- Dieter Daniels, Alba D’Urbano: Utopie: Ursprung aller Medien. In: Andreas Broekman, *Rudolf Frieling (ed.): Bandbreite-Medien zwischen Kunst und Politik, Kulturverlag Kadmos Berlin 2004.
- Alba D’Urbano/Tina Bara/Susanne Holschbach (ed.): Bellissima, exhibition catalogue, Hochschule für Grafik und Buchkunst, Leipzig, 2006.
- Alba D’Urbano/Tina Bara (ed.): Eine Frage (nach) der Geste, exhibition catalogue Fotohof Salzburg Edition, Salzburg, 2008.
- Alba D’Urbano: Private Property: all you need... In: LIVRAISON T.11 Multiples et autres/and other Multiples (S. 16-25), Rhinoceros, Strasbourg, 2008/2009.
- Alba D’Urbano: Erschreckend Schön: Körperpoetik und Körperkonstruktion. In KUNSTmagazin 1005 (p. 8-13), KUNSTverlag, Berlin 2011.
