= Blackhawk Films =

Blackhawk Films, from the 1950s through the early 1980s, marketed motion pictures on 16mm, 8mm and Super 8 film. Most were vintage one- or two-reel short subjects, usually comedies starring Laurel and Hardy, Our Gang, Charlie Chaplin, Buster Keaton, and other famous comedy series of the past. Blackhawk also offered newsreels, documentaries, and silent feature films. With the rise of the video market in the early 1980s, Blackhawk began producing video versions of many of their titles in 1981 and within a few years no longer manufactured film copies. The company was later purchased by Republic Pictures in 1985, and the film elements still later by archivist David Shepard.

== History of Blackhawk Films ==
The company was founded in 1927 as Eastin Pictures by Kent D. Eastin, who made movie ads for merchants, filmed local news events for theater newsreels and sold independent 35 mm theatrical film prints for home projectors of the day. Eastin worked from his parents’ home in Galesburg, Illinois. With the advent of 16mm sound film in 1932, Eastin moved his company to Davenport, Iowa, operating a rental library until 1957 when business slowed due to television. Davenport was also home to the Victor Animatograph Corporation, a pioneer motion picture equipment manufacturer.

With a background in direct mail and management, Martin D. Phelan left Montgomery Ward to become Eastin's business partner in 1947. The Blackhawk name was first used for a secondary business, liquidating stocks of used 16mm prints from British Information Services, Mills Panoram Soundies, and other libraries and producers. Blackhawk began publishing monthly catalogs in 1949. More than 2,500,000 used films were sold by mail order before this business was discontinued in 1981.

In 1952, Blackhawk introduced its own releases in both 8mm and 16mm. Included in this "Collector Series" were Laurel and Hardy silents from Hal Roach Studios, authorized editions of Keystone comedies licensed by Sennett's original backer, Roy Aitken, and a group of railroad films (Eastin was a lifelong rail fan). Consumer interest grew, and soon Blackhawk was offering a wide variety of vintage comedies, dramas, westerns, musicals, documentaries, serials, and cartoons. Unlike the home-movie dealers Castle Films and Official Films, which offered brief excerpts from longer films, Blackhawk released complete subjects as they were shown in theaters.

Blackhawk continued to cater to dyed-in-the-wool silent-film enthusiasts; Art Acord, Theda Bara, Charles Hutchinson, Lige Conley, Lloyd Hamilton, Alice Howell, and Richard Talmadge were just some of the silent-era personalities whose work had almost totally vanished until Blackhawk brought some representative reels to light. The company issued a tabloid-sized catalog, the "Blackhawk Bulletin," which heralded the latest releases and sales promotions each month.

Boasting up to 18 new releases every month, an in-house film restoration facility as good as any owned by film archives, and more than 90 employees working in a picturesque, century-old building of roughly 30,000 square feet (2,800 m^{2}), Blackhawk grew to dominate the home-movie field with a base of 125,000 customers. Fox Movietone News, silent-film revivalist Paul Killiam, and National Telefilm Associates joined Hal Roach as important sources for Blackhawk's releases. Other rare finds were offered to Eastin by private collectors, for reprinting in the home-movie gauges.

Since the late 1960s, David Shepard of the American Film Institute had been working closely with Kent Eastin to ensure permanent preservation of Blackhawk's unique original films at the Library of Congress. Shepard joined the Blackhawk Films staff in 1973, and spearheaded the ambitious restoration of Charlie Chaplin's twelve Mutual comedies of 1916–17. Shepard later became vice president of Blackhawk Films.

In 1975, with business booming in the Super 8 and 16mm film formats, Eastin and Phelan sold Blackhawk to Lee Enterprises, a successful newspaper and broadcasting conglomerate also based in Davenport. The rapid rise in the price of silver (essential to black-and-white film processing) caused home-movie retail prices to skyrocket, and many collectors abandoned film in favor of then-new home video. Lee Enterprises' decision to emphasize mail-order sales instead of a unique product line, and heavy investments in the Betamax and CED (RCA's mechanical video disc) formats, proved very costly.

Lee Enterprises sold the company to its Blackhawk management team, who continued until 1985 when Republic Pictures bought the company. Republic discontinued film sales and closed the Davenport facility in 1987.

Shepard owned Film Preservation Associates, specializing in restoration of silent film classics. He started FPA with the purchase of the Blackhawk film library. Although the film-sales business had slowed dramatically, Shepard continued to serve serious hobbyists by selling new 16mm prints of Blackhawk subjects, made to order. In July 2007 he announced that Blackhawk Films would discontinue the 16mm business. Shepard then devoted his energies to video restorations of classic motion pictures, until his death in 2017. The Blackhawk Films/Film Preservation Associates Collection is now held at the Academy Film Archive and owned by Paris-based Lobster Films.

== Catalogs of Blackhawk Films ==
Hundreds of catalogs have been published over the years. Most of them have been digitized and made accessible online by the University of Southern California's HMH Foundation Moving Image Archive.
