= Tina Bara =

German photographer

- Born: 18 March 1962 (age 64); Kleinmachnow, Brandenburg, GDR (East Germany)
- Occupation: Photographer

Tina Bara (born 18 March 1962, in Kleinmachnow) is a German photographer who began her career in the German Democratic Republic Her work was featured in several exhibitions at key galleries and museums, including the Galerie Eigen + Art, Leipzig and the Kunsthalle Erfurt. In MutualArt’s artist press archive, Tina Bara is featured in Interference, a piece from the Revista Arta in 2020.

Before reunification, she was in touch with peace movement in the German Democratic Republic.

== Life ==
Bara was born just outside Berlin, but grew up in Guben, then on what had since 1945, been the frontier of the German Democratic Republic with Poland.

In 1980, she moved back to Berlin, and from 1980 to 1986, attended the Humboldt University of Berlin, where she studied History and Art History. As a student, she was in touch with political opposition groups, including Frauen für den Frieden (Women for Peace). (The German Democratic Republic was hosting more than 300,000 Soviet troops at the time.) While still at university Bara held her first exhibition at the regional Public Arts House at Berlin-Treptow. In 1986 she joined the East German League of Image Artists as a freelance photographer. During this time, her commissions included work on documentary films for DEFA, the state-owned film company, including flüstern & SCHREIEN – Ein Rockreport, a major documentary project lasting three years and headed up by Dieter Schumann.

In 1986, Bara started a correspondence course in photography with the Academy of Visual Arts in Leipzig. However, this was becoming a period of increasing political instability for the German Democratic Republic and she discontinued the course in 1989 without, at this stage, receiving a qualification. Instead, in July 1989, a few months before the Berlin wall fell, she found she was able to emigrate through the "Inner frontier" and relocated to West Berlin, where she pursued a career as a freelance artist-photographer, also working on video documentaries.

In 1991, she received, belatedly, a diploma with de:Arno Fischer (Fotograf)Arno Fischer from the Leipzig Academy of Visual Arts where, since 1993, she has held a professorship in photography.

== Work ==
Bara's self taught method of photography in which she films the female body in close range conveys a sense of societal discomfort. This was illustrated in her 1988 work, o.T. (Untitled) in fourteen parts. Bara's critical and political consciousness was shaped by her participation in Frauen fur den Frieden, and explored through her autobiographical photography, in which her understanding of self and the world was mirrored. She stated in 2009 that, "My female gaze arose from my biography and from my personal search for identity. A distancing feminist self-assertion was not our thing."
