= Raffaele Caravaglios =

Italian bandmaster (1864–1941)

Raffaele Caravaglios (28 December 1864, in Castelvetrano – 29 November 1941, in Naples) was an Italian bandmaster.

== Biography ==
He was born in Castelvetrano (in the province of Trapani) to Giuseppa Margiotta, a housewife, and Francesco Caravaglios, a violin and trumpet teacher and bandmaster. The Caravaglios were natives of Spain: in 1856 Raffaele’s grandfather, who was a composer for bands and orchestras, was called from Castelvetrano to substitute for another master and later appointed as local bandmaster.

As a young boy he attended concerts accompanied by his father in various towns in Sicily. When he was fourteen, he was orphaned and admitted to the Royal College of Music in Palermo, where he studied and got a diploma in violin and composition at 18 years old. While he was conducting one of Wagner’s pieces during the rehearsal for an exhibition, he received congratulations from the author himself, who was in Palermo at that time and visiting the Conservatory.

In 1884 he was appointed as the director of the School of Music in Camporeale, where he met his future wife, Maria Antonietta Cipolla.

Two years later, in 1886, as he wanted to go back to his town, he accepted the entrusting of the direction of the Band of Castelvetrano, and simultaneously the bands of Alcamo and Trapani. In 1892, together with the band of Alcamo, took part in the National Exposition of Bands which took place in Palermo every year.

On this occasion, the execution of the pieces performed by the musicians, under the conduct of maestro Caravaglios, let the band win the first prize (Diploma of Honour) and the Gold Medal during a competition among the 38 music bands of Sicily. Since then it is honoured to have the privilege to be called “Premiato Complesso Bandistico città di Alcamo".

Thanks to the fame he acquired with so many contests won as conductor, in 1896 he was appointed as the master of the municipal band of Naples, where he conducted the orchestra of teatro San Carlo during the intermezzos of operas being performed. The opening concert was so successful that received the approval of Neapolitan press: it was followed by the famous concerts held at the Public Garden, which became a standing appointment since 1899.

He had also the title of “Officer of Academy” by the French Government, for his promotion of French music in Italy; then there were invitations and honours from Germany and Scotland.

Moreover, Caravaglios taught instrumentation at the Conservatory San Pietro a Maiella in Naples and at the Music School of Real Albergo dei Poveri. He was the director of Liceo Musicale "Giuseppe Verdi" and the honorary president of the Musical Institute "Riccardo Wagner".

In 1922, during a concert in Rome, he simultaneously directed the four bands of the capital: the newspapers wrote then that Caravaglios was the greatest instrumental director for bands in Italy.

Among his estimators there were masters of classical and lyrical music: Libero Bovio, Pietro Mascagni, Malipiero, Wagner, Richard Georg Strauss and other personalities like Antonio Cardarelli and Matilde Serao); E.A. Mario dedicated him the first copy of the transcription for bands of La leggenda del Piave.

He died in Naples, where spent most of his life, on 29 November 1941. His grave is inside the local cemetery. The Neapolitan Public Garden bears his name; Castelvetrano, his native town, has entitled a street to him, and Alcamo too. Besides, two bands, one in Camporeale and another in Castelvetrano, are named after him.

== Works ==
Author of symphonies, hymns, holy music and operettas, he mostly devoted himself to the transcription of pieces of music for bands; this is the list of his works:

1880 Bifronte, canon inverse

188.? Danza degli zoppi: americanata di Raffaele Caravaglios; Bologna: C. Venturi

1880-1900 Minuetto per pianoforte di Raffaele Caravaglios; Bologna: C. Venturi

1882 Sinfonia, for orchestra

1882 Intermezzo, andantino, for 15 instruments

1889 Studio e lavoro, a symphony for Band

1890 Fantasia eroica, for Band

1890 Disillusione, original fantasy in score for band by R.Caravaglios; Palermo: Luigi Sandron

Disillusione: original fantasy by Raffaele Caravaglios; instrumentation by Stefano Gatta; La Loggia: Scomegna, 2013

1892 Quartetto, for flutes

1892 Un matrimonio a mezzanotte, opera (Libretto of G.E. Fazio), performed at the Civic Theatre of Alcamo

1893 La figlia del Matador, opera (Libretto of G.E. Fazio). It was represented 130 times in Tunisia.

1893 La contessa di Boccadoro, operetta

1893 Il seminarista, operetta

1894 Preghiera, for six mandolins and piano

1895 Zingaresca, a characteristic piece for Band by M° Caravaglios;

1895 Roma, a symphony for Band

1899 Tristezza, an elegy for Band

1899 La desolata, a funeral march for Band

1900 Messa da Requiem for Band

!900 Paginetta d'album for piano, presented in Piedigrotta 1900;

1901 Per Domenico Morelli, a funeral march for Band

1902 Gesù è morto, an epicedium for Band

1903 Canzone triste, a song (verse by Federigo Buffon and music by R. Caravaglios); Napoli, A. Morano & figlio, 1903;

1903 Marcia funebre in forma di elegia, for Band

1904 L’entrata di Pulcinella, for Band

1904 Inno a Loubet, marcia trionfale, for Band

1904 Inno al commercio, for Band (verse by Ugo Ricci)

1905 Il sabato del villaggio, lied on the poem of Giacomo Leopardi

1905 Minuetto, for Band

1905 Pensiero Funebre, a funeral march in memory of dr. T. Musumeci from Acireale, for band

1906 Marcianno; musica by R. Caravaglios and verse by Ciullo; Napoli, Raffaele Calace; it is in: Piedigrotta R. Calace: album 1906

1907 Rapsodia garibaldina, for Band

1908 Alla Patria, Inno nazionale, for Band (verse by C. Sipione)

1908 Inno dei Giornalisti, for Band

1909 Mazurka, per pianoforte N.2; Napoli, R. Calace

1909 Rapsodia Napoletana, for Band, from pieces of music by S. Gambardella

1910 Inno patriottico, for Band

1910 La Perugina: Atto II di Ettore Mascheroni, instrumentation by Raffaele Caravaglios; Milano, G. Ricordi e C.,

1911 Op. 61, n 1: Giga di Martucci, Giuseppe(1856-1909), instrumentation for band, by Raffaele Caravaglios; Milano, G. Ricordi e C.,

1911 Op.70, n 1: Notturno, in sol bemolle di Giuseppe Martucci, instrumentation for band, by Raffaele Caravaglios; Milano, G. Ricordi C.,

1911 Otello: sunto atto 4 di G.Verdi; instrumentation by Raffaello Caravaglios; Milano: G. Ricordi e C.

1911 Otello: sunto atto 4° di G. Verdi; instrumentation by Raffaele Caravaglios; Milano: G. Ricordi & C.

???? La Traviata: Preludio Atto I di G. Verdi; transcription by Maestro Cravaglios; Roma: C. Zinzi

1911 Notturno in Sol bemolle : Op.70 n.1 di Giuseppe Martucci; instrumentation for band by Raffaele Caravaglios; Milano: G.Ricordi & C.

1912 La walkiria: Incantesimo del fuoco di R.Wagner; instrumentation by Raffaele Caravaglios; Milano: G. Ricordi e C., 1912

1912 Inno per i ricoverati della “Casa paterna Ravaschieri”

1913 Inno dei giornalisti; Firenze: G. Mignani e Figlio

1913 Suite in 4 tempi, transcribed for 4 flugelhorns; Roma, Casa editrice "Musica"

1913 Inno alla Patria, for Band

1913 Cento temi di Marcia, for Band

1913 Marcia in mib, for Band

1913 I Maestri cantori di Norimberga di R.Wagner: Atto 3°(sunto); instrumentation by Raffaele Caravaglios; Milano: G. Ricordi e C.

1914 Le reve des roses, a choreographic fantasy

1914 Stiratrì, canzone (verse by N. Celentano)

1914 Op. 2: Suite in quattro tempi di Victor De Sabata, Instrumentation by Raffaele Caravaglios; Milano: G. Ricordi e C.

1915 Allegro di Concerto, for clarinets soprano in Sib by Raffaele Caravaglios; revision and arrangement for symphonic band by Paolino Addesso; Eboli, VigorMusic, 2012

1915 Strazio, largo triste, for Band

1916 Suite romantica in quattro parti di Alfano Franco (1876-1954), instrumentation by Raffaele Caravaglios; Milano: G. Ricordi e C.

1917 Le Villi: La tregenda di Puccini Giacomo. Instrumentation by Raffaele Caravaglios; Milano: G. Ricordi e C.

1918 Canto la primavera, romanza (verse by P. Elia)

1918 Canto di nostalgia, romanza (verse by P. Elia)

1920 Avanti, avanti Italia, for Band

1920 Brevi cenni storici sull'origine della tromba di Buonomo Carmine, with an introduction of the famous Master Caravaglios Raffaele

Grumo Nevano: tip. fratelli Marino, 1920

1922 Improvvisata, for Violin and Piano

1922 Lezioni di istrumentazione e orchestrazione per banda dettate nel Regio Conservatorio di musica "S. Pietro a Majella" by Raffaele Caravaglios; Napoli: Ceccoli & figli,1922

1923 Messa da requiem, for Band

1923 Imparate a leggere, a song

1925 A Giuseppe Mazzini, triumphal hymn, for Band (verse by R.Di Lauro)

1925 Inno a Pio XI, for Band

1926 Inno al fascismo, for Band (verse by A.M. Foschini)

1926 Messa da Requiem per i funerali solenni della Regina Margherita

1926 All’Ave Maria, for Band

1926 Ouverture miniatura, for Band

1926 L’artigliere (verse by O. Caterini)

1928 Mussolini, a hymn for Band (verse by L. Cocco)

1928 O Roma o Roma (Marcia degli Eroi), a hymn for Band, verse by R.Di Lauro and music by R. Caravaglios; Napoli: F.lli de Marino

1928 Interludio, passaggio di maschere e finale dall'Hoffmann. Atto 3° di Guido Laccetti; transcription for band by Raffaele Caravaglios Napoli: f.lli Marino

1928 Inno al Re, for Band (verse by P.E. Bosi)

1928 Canto dei fascisti, for Band

1928 Canzone del dopolavoro, for Band

1928 Inno di pace, for Band (verse by P. Elia)

1928 Inno di guerra, for Band (verse by P. Elia)

1929 Ammore e mò, a song

1929 Scene abruzzesi: Seconda suite per orchestra di De Nardis Camillo, transcription for big band by Raffaele Caravaglios. I tempo. Processione notturna del Venerdì santo; Milano: G.Ricordi e C. Edit. Tip.

1929 Scene abruzzesi: Seconda suite per orchestra di De Nardis Camillo, transcription for big band by Raffaele Caravaglios. II tempo. San Clemente a casauria; Milano: G.Ricordi e C. Edit. Tip.

1929 Scene abruzzesi: Seconda suite per orchestra di De Nardis Camillo, transcription for big band by Raffaele Caravaglios. IV tempo. Festa tragica, Milano: G. Ricordi e C. Edit. Tip.

1929 Tosca: Sunto dell'opera, Parte I di G.Puccini, transcription for big band by Raffaele Caravaglios (score); Milano, G.Ricordi e C. Edit. Tip.

1929 Suite in quattro tempi: III Idillio di Victor De Sabata; instrumentation for band by Raffaele Caravaglios Milano: G. Ricordi e C. Edit. Tip.,

1929 Suite in quattro tempi: Op. 2 di Victor De Sabata; Instrumentation [for band] by Raffaele Caravaglios Milano: G. Ricordi e C. Edit. Tip.

1929 Suite in quattro tempi: Opera 2 di Victor De Sabata, II tempo, Tra fronda e fronda; instrumentation for big band by Raffaele Caraviglios; Milano: G. Ricordi e C. Edit. Tip.

1929 Suite in quattro tempi: Opera 2 di Victor De Sabata, II tempo, Risveglio mattutino; instrumentation for big band by Raffaele Caraviglios; Milano: G. Ricordi e C. Edit. Tip.

1930 Tosca: Sunto dell'opera, Parte II di G.Puccini, transcription for big band by Raffaele Caravaglios (score);Milano, G.Ricordi e C. Edit. Tip.

1930 Ave Maria, for piano, violin and canto

1930 Grande Fantasia inaugurale Gilson-Caravaglios, for Band

1930 O duce a Napule (verse by P. Ferrigno), for Mussolini's visit in the town

1931 Ave spes italica, martial impromptu for Band

1931 Inno dei giovani fascisti di combattimento, for Band (verse by V. Gorga)

1931 Inno municipale, for Band

1931 Inno per l’aviazione italiana, for Band (verse by G. Pandolfo)

1932 Marcia reale italiana, for Band

1932 Marcia, for Band

1932 Pianto di madre, marcia funebre per grande Banda di R.Caravaglios-Avellis, Vincenzo; Molfetta: Vincenzo Avellis

1932 Tutti compositori, o l'arte di saper Ben comporre 1000 brillantissime polke per pianoforte, anche da coloro che non conoscono la musica!:passatempo; Nocera Inferiore (Salerno), S.Pucci, 1932 (Firenze, Mignani)

1933 Inno a S. Gennaro, for Band

1933 Rapsodia partenopea, for Band,(le canzoni di E. A. Mario per banda), conduttore e 61 parti; Napoli, E. A. Mario, (Firenze, Stamp. Mignani)

1933 Stilo antico, ouverture minuscola for Band

1934 Quinta rapsodia partenopea, for Band, from songs by Murolo e Tagliaferri

1934 Maria Pia, marcia sabauda, for Band

1935 Marcia della X Legione Ferroviaria, for Band

1936 Gran marcia imperiale italiana(dedicata a Mussolini); Roma: C. Zinzi

1936 All'Italia imperiale: inno con versi di Antonio Cappa e musica di R. Caravaglios; Firenze: Mignani

1936 Avanti, o Italia!: hymn by Franz Carella. Transcription for Band by Raffaele Caravaglios; Napoli, F.lli De Marino

???? Molti nemici molto onore; marcia militare

???? Grido di Vittoria; marcia militare

1938 Perduta, marcia funebre di Caravaglios; Molfetta: Vincenzo Avellis, 1938

1940 Ave Maria: Per canto, violino, violoncello e pianoforte di Raffaele Caravaglios; Cosenza: A. Muti, 1940

1940 Marcia Funebre | Raffaele Caravaglios; Molfetta, Vincenzo Avellis

1941 Epopea Italica, per Banda (su testo d’Emilio Avitabile) canto in onore delle gesta dell’Impero durante la campagna d’Africa.

19..? Inno della vittoria: per pianoforte di Tito Mirenghi; istrumentato per banda dal M° Cav. R. Caravaglios; Napoli: Raffaele Izzi,

???? Il matrimonio inaspettato, Sinfonia di G.Paisiello; trascrizione per Banda del maestro R. Caravaglios [1911-1940]

???? Margherita regina d'Italia; Caravaglios, Raffaele; Merlo, Vincenzo: Coro, nella cantata in omaggio di S.M. la regina Margherita; Poesia di Vincenzo Merlo, Presidente del R.Collegio di Musica di Palermo; Musica di Pietro Platania, Direttore del Collegio di Musica di Palermo; Proprietà di R. C.: autografo, [1861-1890]

???? Marcia Funebre del Maestro Comm: R.Caravaglios e Sabino Andriani;Molfetta [1911-1940]

???? Vittorio Emanuele III: marcia militare for Band; Napoli, A. Ricci

???? Stella, stè...! versi di Federico Buffon e musica di Raffaele Caravaglios; it is in: Piedigrotta: numero unico

== See also ==
- Castelvetrano
- Teatro San Carlo
- Premiato Complesso Bandistico "Città di Alcamo"

== Sources ==
- http://castelvetranonews.it/notizie/?r=6K7#
- http://www.treccani.it/enciclopedia/cesare-caravaglios_(Dizionario-Biografico)/
- Zazzera Sergio: Raffaele Caravaglios. Profilo di un musicista, a cura di Nigro V.; ed. Spring (collana Biblioteca mobile, 2003, pp. 216
- Carlo Cataldo: I suoni sommersi p. 72; ed. Campo, Alcamo, 1997
- Ferruccio Centonze: Raffaele Caravaglios musicista; il linguaggio della memoria, 1984
- http://kele-paroleemusica.blogspot.it/2011/10/raffaele-caravaglios.html
- http://www.febasi.com/media2/febasi-magazine/item/368-n%C2%B0-6-febasi-magazine-novembre-dicembre-2015.html
- Andrea Chiarelli, Dario Cocchiara, Alcamo nel XX secolo volume I, Alcamo, Campo, 2005.
