= Ben Model =

US film historian, composer and musician

Ben Model (born 1962) is an American musician, historian, publisher, and presenter of silent films. An accompanist, he composes and performs organ or piano music for silent films. He accompanies films live and records scores for home video releases. He founded a DVD label called Undercrank Productions that releases rare or lost silent films. His name is accented on the second syllable (mo-DELL).

== Biography ==
Model was a student of silent film organist Lee Erwin. He volunteered to provide musical accompaniment to silent films showings while a film student. His live performances are largely improvised. The music he plays also provides audio cues to shifts in the story and highlights actions and events in the films.

Model has hosted programs for the Cleveland Institute of Art and Museum of Modern Art. In New York City. He travels extensively doing presentations, many in schools. He performs regularly at MoMA and at the Library of Congress’ Packard Campus Theater.

In 2020, during the COVID-19 pandemic, Model and film historian Steve Massa hosted a weekly live-streamed show of silent films with musical accompaniment.

He and fellow performers David Razin and Stephen Horne as well as orchestras and bands accompanying films have drawn crowds and helped renew audience interest in the silent film genre. He has discussed filmmakers such as Alice Guy.

== Bibliography ==
- Accidentally Preserved: Notes on the Films by Steven Massa, Ben Model, Undercrank Productions (November 27, 2013)

== See also ==
- Paul Killiam
