= Curci =

Curci is an Italian surname that may refer to

- Amelita Galli-Curci (1882–1963), Italian soprano
  - Amelita Galli-Curci Estate in New York, U.S.
  - Galli-Curci Theatre in New York, U.S.
- Carlo Curci (1846-after 1916), Italian painter
- Carlo Maria Curci (1810–1891), Italian theologian
- Fran Curci (born 1938), American football player and coach
- Freddy Curci (born 1962), Canadian rock vocalist and songwriter
- Gianluca Curci (born 1985), Italian football goalkeeper
- Ofelia Giudicissi Curci (1934–1981), Italian poet and archeologist
