= Michel Comte =

Swiss artist, filmmaker and fashion and portrait photographer

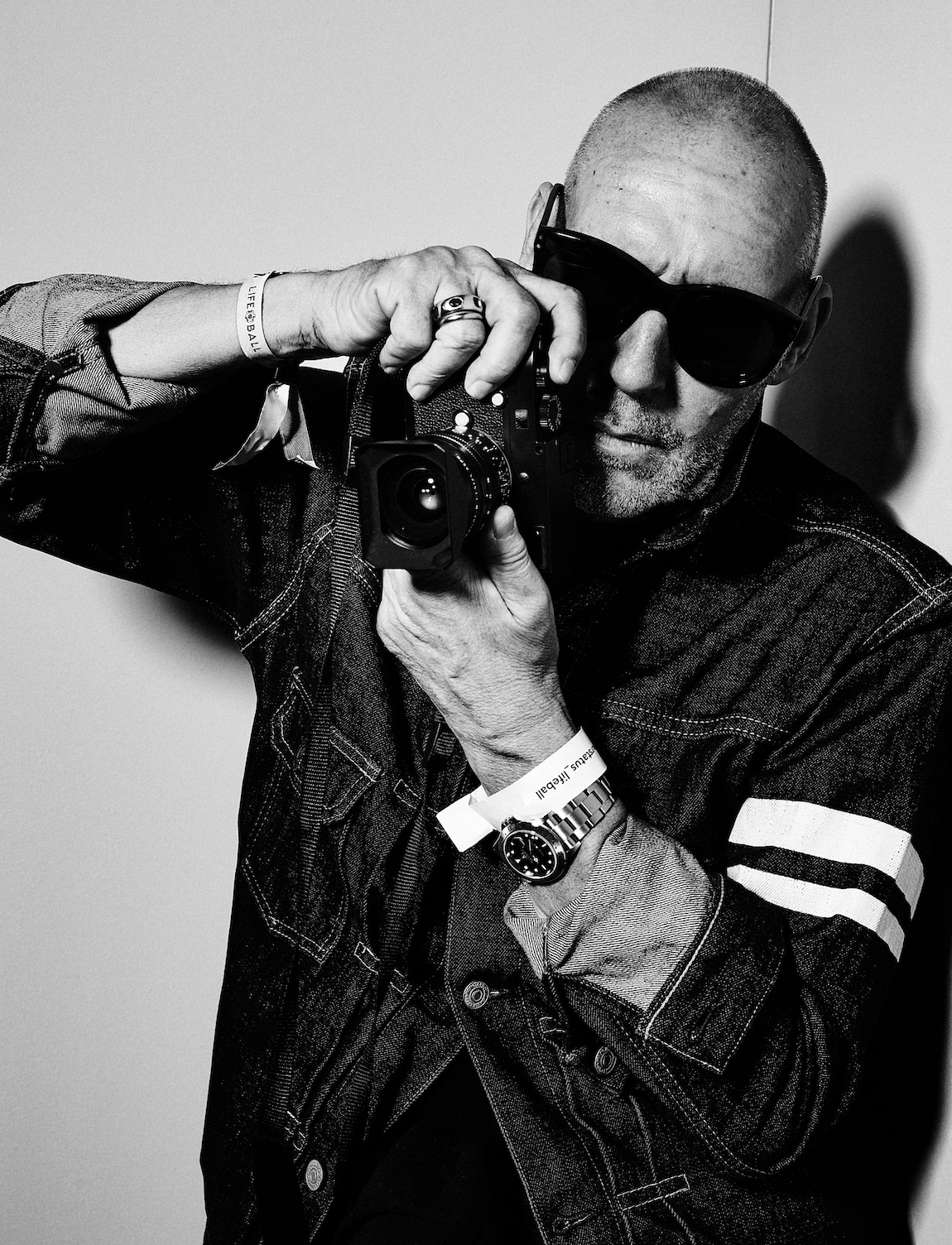
- Born: Michel Alfred Comte; 19 February 1954 (age 72); Zürich, Switzerland
- Known for: Photography, Films and multi-media art works
- Notable work: The Girl from Nagasaki, Light
- Spouse: Dominique Kamber (m. 1986; div. 1997) Ayako Yoshida (m. 2008; div. 2025)
- Children: 2
- Website: StudioMichelComte.com

Michel Alfred Comte (born 19 February 1954) is a Swiss artist, filmmaker, fashion and portrait photographer. His most recent art project 'Light', focuses on the impact of environmental decline through his large-scale installations, paintings, sculptures and multimedia artworks.

Comte started his career as an art restorer, specializing in contemporary artworks such as Andy Warhol and Yves Klein. In 1979, he was discovered by Karl Lagerfeld, who gave him his first international assignment for Chloé and later Chanel. He became well known for his work with Vogue Italia, l'Uomo Vogue, Vanity Fair and Interview over the years, and has worked with brands such as Dolce & Gabbana, Gianfranco Ferre, BMW and Ferrari amongst others. He directed and produced his first feature film in 3D, The Girl from Nagasaki - a retelling of the classic opera Madama Butterfly, which premiered at the Sundance Film Festival in 2014.

Away from the high-gloss magazines and his campaigns for luxury brands, Comte kept himself grounded by taking on photo assignments for the International Red Cross (ICRC) in war-ravaged regions like Bosnia, Angola, Rwanda and Somalia. His work with the ICRC contributed to fundraising efforts to build an orthopaedic hospital in Kabul, Afghanistan and helped raise awareness and money for victims of conflict.

A passionate mountain climber and aviator, Comte began investigating climate change as a student and has had the unprecedented opportunity to observe and portray glacial landscapes all over the world. Two decades ago, Comte decided to wind down most of his activities as a commercial photographer to focus on Light, his most recent art project. Light is the study of natural landscapes and explores the impact of environmental changes via sculpture, paintings, installations and photography.

Light has been exhibited at the Triennale di Milano (2017), MAXXI in Rome (2017), Urs Meile Galleries (Beijing 2018 and Lucerne 2020) and Dirimart (Turkey) (2019).

== Early life and career ==
Comte was born 19 February 1954, in Zürich, Switzerland, the only child of Alfred Heinrich Comte (1926–2022) and Sylvia Maria Comte (née Boetschi; 1928–2015). His paternal grandfather was Swiss aviation pioneer Alfred Comte who co-founded Swissair. His father was a field sales representative and later board member of his photo studio Michel Comte SA. Beginning with his grandfather, the family frequented Kronenhalle restaurant in Zürich, on a regular basis.

He studied in England and in France, then started his career in contemporary art restoration, specializing in the works of Andy Warhol and Yves Klein. He was interested in photography and when moving to Paris in 1979, he was discovered by Karl Lagerfeld, who gave him first international assignment for the fashion house of Chloe. Comte then started working for such publications as Vogue US, Vogue Italia, Per Lui, Vanity Fair, and fashion houses such as Emanuel Ungaro, Chanel, Giorgio Armani and so on.

== Career ==
Comte produced many portraits including Jeremy Irons, Louise Bourgeois, Mike Tyson, Akira Kurosawa, Sharon Stone, Carla Bruni, Naomi Campbell, Helena Christensen, Miles Davis, Vanessa Paradis. Many of his images are shot for his long-time friend and influencer Franca Sozzani, an editor-in-chief of Vogue Italia. He continues to shoot for Vogue Italia. His advertising projects include Dolce & Gabbana, Nike, Lancôme, Ferrari, Jaguar, Mercedes-Benz, BMW, Hennessy, Davidoff, Gianfranco Ferre, Hermes, Trussardi, Pomellato, Celine, Givenchy, Zeiss and so on. He was awarded as Photographer of the year 2000 by PHOTO magazine.

Comte also followed the career of F1 driver Michael Schumacher.

=== Photo journalism ===
Comte is involved in and known for his photo-reportage and documentary work. In collaboration with Pomellato and International Committee of the Red Cross, he contributed to the construction of the orthopaedic centre in Kabul. He traveled in conflict areas such as Bosnia, Kosovo, South Sudan, Iraq, Afghanistan and many others.

=== Film ===
Comte directed and produced his first feature film in 3D, The Girl from Nagasaki, retelling of the classic opera, Madame Butterfly, in which Puccini's tragic heroine, emerging from the ashes of the atomic bomb, begins her fateful story of obsession for an American pilot.

== Personal life ==
After living in Milan and Paris, Comte relocated to New York City in 1981. In 1986, he married Dominique Kamber, a photo model. They divorced in 1997. They had two sons;

- Diederik Comte (born 1987), a photographer
- Brandon Oliver Comte (1993–2024)

In September 2007, Comte met Japanese-born model, stylist, costume designer and filmmaker Ayako Yoshida (born 1983), whom he married in April 2008. They have been living in Bel Air, Los Angeles in California for over ten years before relocating back Switzerland. They divorced in 2025.

Comte currently resides in Küsnacht on Lake Zürich.

== Books ==
- Michel Comte. Object Carpet, Achermann, 1996
- Michel Comte: Kontraste/Contrasts, Stern Portfolio Library of Photography, 1998
- Twenty Years 1979-1999: Faces by Michel Comte - Schirmer/Mosel, 1999
- Aiko T. - Steidl, 2000
- People and Places with No Name - Steidl, 2000
- Charlie Chaplin: A Photo Diary - Steidl, 2002
- Michael Schumacher: Driving Force - Ebury, 2003
- Michael by Michel (Michael Schumacher by Michel Comte) - Steidl, 2003
- The Face of Pace, Scuderia Ferrari - 2006
- Michel Comte on Women - I-Management, 2006
- Michel Comte: The Classics - I-Management, 2007
- Badenfahrt - Ed. Zimmermann, 2007
- Tibet, Zimmermann, 2007
- 791: Michel Comte on Michael Schumacher - Ed. Zimmermann, 2007
- Speed! Michel Comte on Michael Schumacher, La Scuderia Ferrari, 2007
- Michel Comte - 360° - NRW Forum Kultur und Wirtschaft/Museum fur Gestaltung, 2008
- Michel Comte - Thirty Years and Five Minutes - teNeues, 2009
- Michel Comte, Crescendo Fotografico, curated by Walter Keller, Carlo Cambi Editore, 2010
- Michel Comte: Not Only Women, Feminine Icons of Our Times - Silvana Editoriale, 2011
- The Little Girl from Nagasaki, A Film by Michel Comte, 2014
- Michel Comte and MILK. A collaboration - Damiani, 2015
- Light, Michel Comte, Steidl, 2017
- Aviator, Michael Comte, Steidl, 2020

== Exhibitions ==
- Peggy Guggenheim, Venice 1995
- Wanderausstellung, Germany 2001
- Centro Internazionale di Fotografia, Verona 2002
- He Xiang Ning Art Museum, Shenzhen, 2005
- The Face of Pace. La Scuderia Ferrari. Michel Comte, Pinakothek der Moderne, Munich 2006
- Michel Comte on Women, Hotel Suvretta House, St Moritz, 2006
- Pobeda Gallery, Moscow 2007
- Espace de l'art contemporain, Mouans-Sartoux 2008
- NRW-Forum, Düsseldorf 2009
- Young Gallery, Brussels 2009
- Museum fur Gestaltung, Zürich 2009
- Not Only Women, Lu.C.C.A. Center of Contemporary Arts, Lucca 2010
- Crescendo Fotografico, Triennale di Milano, Milan 2011
- Grand Palais, Paris, 2011
- Contemporary Istanbul, Istanbul, 2012
- Au Premier, HB, Zürich, 2013
- Kunst Haus, Vienna, 2013
- Galerie XXI, Geneva, 2015
- MILK, New York, 2015
- Michel Comte Neoclassic, Palazzo del Governatore, Parma, 2016
- Michel Comte. Light, MAXXI, Rome, 2017
- Michel Comte Black Light, White Light, Triennale di Milano, Milan, 2017
- Light III, Galerie Urs Meile, Beijing 2018
- Erosion, Galerie Urs Meile, Lucerne 2020
