= Fabio Cifariello Ciardi =

Italian composer (born 1960)

Fabio Cifariello Ciardi (born 15 August 1960) is an Italian composer of acoustic and electroacoustic music.

He studied composition, electronic music and musicology at Rome Conservatory of Music and Bologna University. He studied with Tristan Murail, Philippe Manoury (IRCAM), Franco Donatoni (Accademia S.Cecilia). In 1991 he won the selection for the Cursus de Informatique Musicale at IRCAM. In 1995 he has been invited at EMS (Stockholm) as composer in residence.

He has developed theories and methods on the possible relationship between sounds and long-term memory. Since 2006, he is interested in the instrumental transcription of spoken voices. His compositions have been awarded prizes at various international competitions: "Ennio Porrino 1989" (Cagliari), "L. Russolo 1992" (Varese), "MusicaNova 1993" (Praha - Czech), "ICMC Cd selection 1993" (Tokyo - Japan), "Olympia 1993" (Athens - Greek), "Spectri Sonori93" (Tulane - USA), XXV Concours Int. de Musique Electroacoustique 1998 (Bourges - France), Valentino Bucchi 1999 (Roma - Italy), ICMC selection 2000 (Berlin - Germany), Premio Nuova Musica - 39° Concorso Internazionale di Canto Corale C.A.Seghizzi (Gorizia - Italy), "VideoEvento d'Arte 2000" (Torino - Italy), ICMC selection 2002 (Göteborg - Sweden), HK.5 Rimusicazioni Film Festival 2003 (Bolzano - Italy), AITS Best sound in Italian motion pictures 2011 (Rome, Italy).

His music is published and recorded by Raitrade (Rome, Milan), Edipan (Rome), RivoAlto-Casier (Treviso), Symposium-CAT (Trento), International Computer Music Association (San Francisco, USA), AIMI-Associazione Italiana d’Informatica Musicale (Gorizia), Unesco CIME-Cultures Electroniques (Bourges, France).

His works for orchestra have been commissioned and performed by Orchestra Haydn di Trento e Bolzano, Sinfonica di Sanremo, Orchestra MilanoClassica, Orchestra Sinfonica di Perugia, Orchestra di Roma e del Lazio. He has collaborated with performer such as Uri Caine, Magnus Andersonn, Guido Arbonelli, Corrado Canonici, Stefano Cardi, Mario Caroli, Diego Conti, Roberta Gottardi, Mari Kimura, Massimo Laura, Carin Levine, Michele Lo Muto. He has developed software for dissonance calculation and sound spatialization. In 2003 he patented sMax, a toolkit for financial data sonification. Cifariello Ciardi collaborated with the Department of Psychology of “La Sapienza” University in Rome. He has published several works dedicated to music analysis, psychology and policy of music. As a musicologist, he has collaborated with the Research Institute for Music Theatre, Rome and with RAI-Radio3.

He teaches composition and analysis at Perugia Conservatory and founded the Edison Studio with other composers for producing and diffusing electroacoustic music.

== Selected works ==
Main works include:

- Background checks for pre-recorded voice, video and orchestra
- Voci vicine Passion in 4 parts for journalist, video, ensemble and electronics
- Appunti per Amanti Simultanei for trombone, intonarumori and electronics
- Piccoli Studi sul Potere for solo instruments and synchronized video
- Ankaa for clarinet and orchestra
- Trame for orchestra
- Mirroshades II for orchestra
- Ab for nine instruments
- Ra for eight instruments
- S'è desta? for six pianos
- Pause for piano
- Metri for string quartet
- Metafore for string quartet
- Nasdaq Match 0.2 Concerto for piano and real-time financial data
- Nasdaq Match 0.1 Concerto Grosso for flute, clarinet, percussion and real-time financial data
- Nasdaq Voices a real time sonification of financial data
- Occhi a Maggio chamber opera
- Inferno live computer soundtrack (with Edison Studio)
- Das Cabinet des Dr. Caligari live computer soundtrack (with Edison Studio)
- Gli Ultimi Giorni di Pompei live computer soundtrack (with Edison Studio)
- Coplas for actor, soprano and 4 instruments
- Ormond Brasil 10 for actor and piano on a text of F. Dürrenmatt
- Tracce I-V for various solo instruments
- Finzioni for violin and electronics
- Pa(e/s)saggi for viola and electronics (2000)
- Games for contrabass and electronics
- Altri Passaggi for zarb, daf and electronics
- Scaenae Intimae for guitar and electronics selected contemporary repertoire for guitar
