= Cineteca di Bologna =

Film archive in Bologna, Italy

Fondazione Cineteca di Bologna

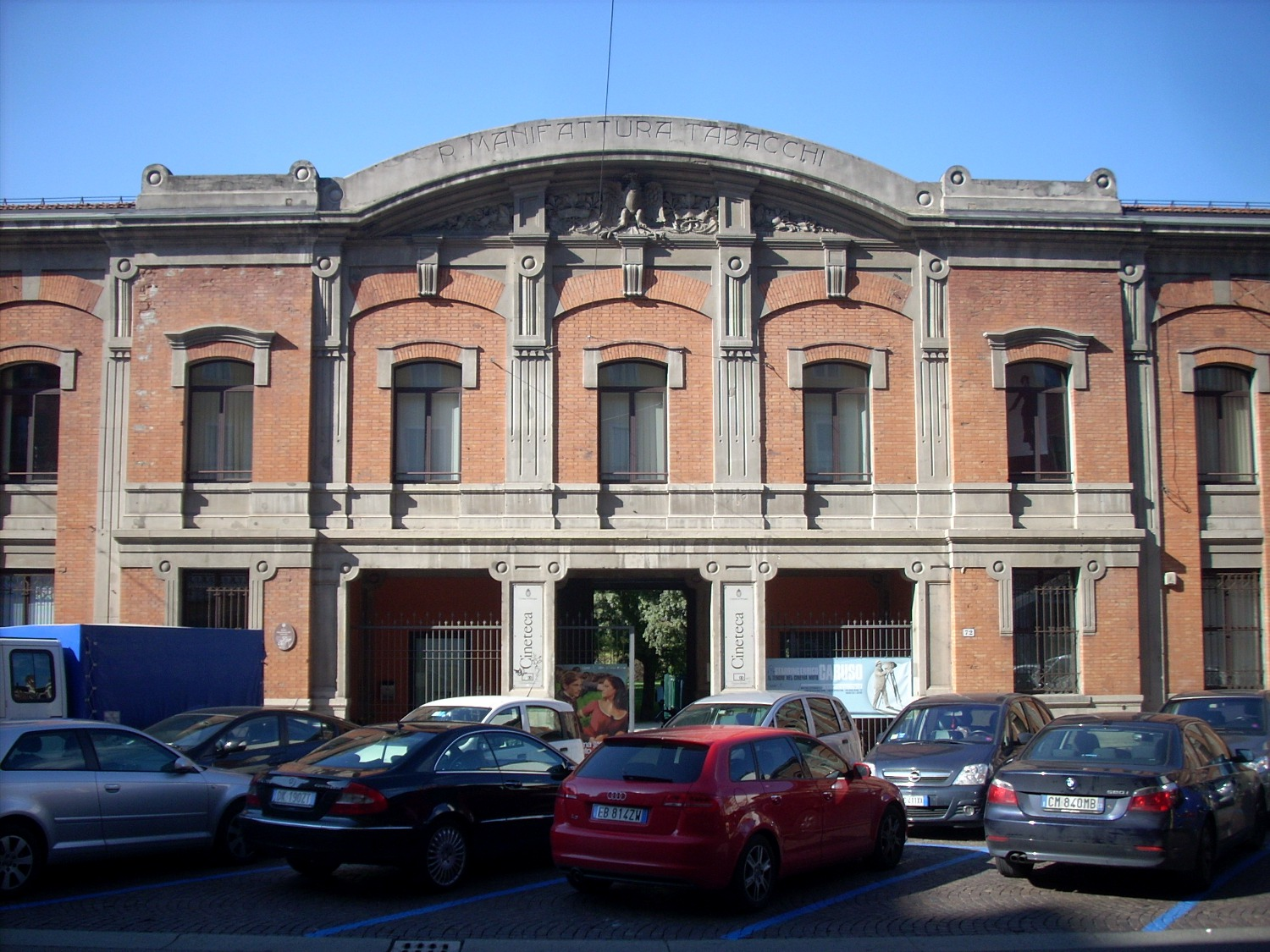
- Entrance to the Cineteca in via Riva di Reno
- Founded: 18 May 1962; 64 years ago
- Type: Foundation
- Location: Via Riva di Reno 72, Bologna, Italy
- President: Marco Bellocchio
- Director: Gian Luca Farinelli
- Affiliations: FIAF, ACE
- Website: cinetecadibologna.it

The Cineteca di Bologna (officially Fondazione Cineteca di Bologna) is a film archive and cultural institution in Bologna, Italy, founded on 18 May 1962 and regarded as one of the most important cinematheques in Europe. A member of the Fédération internationale des archives du film (FIAF) since 1989 and of the Association des cinémathèques européennes (ACE) since that body's creation, it preserves and restores film heritage through its laboratory L'Immagine Ritrovata, holds film, photographic and graphic archives alongside the Renzo Renzi library, runs three cinemas in the city, and organizes the festival Il Cinema Ritrovato. Reconstituted as a foundation in 2012, it has been chaired since March 2014 by the film director Marco Bellocchio, with Gian Luca Farinelli as director.

== History ==
The Cineteca traces its origin to the Commissione Cinema (Cinema Commission), established by the city of Bologna on 18 May 1962, from which the Cineteca del Comune di Bologna developed. It became a full member of FIAF in 1989 and, in 1995, an "autonomous municipal institution" (autonoma istituzione comunale).

In the summer of 2000 it opened its present headquarters in via Riva di Reno, in the former Manifattura Tabacchi tobacco factory. On 28 June 2003 two screens of the Cinema Lumière opened in the converted former municipal slaughterhouse in the Manifattura delle Arti district, alongside the Renzo Renzi library and the non-film collections.

On 1 January 2012 the Cineteca was reconstituted as a foundation, with the municipality of Bologna as founding member. In March 2024 the Emilia-Romagna region joined as a subsequent founding member under regional law, contributing €500,000 across 2024 and 2025, and the board was enlarged from three to five members.

== Collections ==
=== Film ===
The film archive comprises more than 70,000 titles, held as over 90,000 physical elements, chiefly 35 mm and 16 mm prints but also 8 mm, Super 8, 70 mm and 9.5 mm, growing by between 1,500 and 2,500 accessions a year. Its strengths include some 400 Italian silent films, described by the institution as one of the largest such collections in the world, and more than a thousand Soviet titles, said to be the largest holding outside Russia; it also keeps the deposited holdings of the production companies Titanus and Cristaldi Film. A separate audiovisual archive holds over 55,300 films on Blu-ray, DVD and VHS.

=== Photographs and graphic material ===
The photographic archive holds nearly three million images in two sections: film stills and portraits of actors and directors, and around 1,500,000 images of Bologna made between 1873 and 2000. It was begun in the 1960s at the initiative of Renato Zangheri, then the city's culture councillor and later its mayor.

The graphic archive holds 238,000 film posters, mostly Italian and dating from the postwar years to the 1980s. Counting posters, locandine, fotobuste and lobby cards together it comprises over 200,000 documents, of which nearly 40,000 are catalogued, and it incorporates the Maurizio Baroni collection of some 25,000 items covering films released between 1945 and 1978. Brochures, press books, cinema-themed postage stamps and original caricatures are also held.

=== Library and other holdings ===
The Renzo Renzi library holds more than 59,600 volumes and around 2,300 periodical titles, catalogued in the Servizio Bibliotecario Nazionale, with sections on photography, graphic arts and comics. It also holds the personal research archive of Vittorio Martinelli, the historian of silent cinema.

In 2004 the Fondo Pier Paolo Pasolini association, founded by Laura Betti, donated its Pasolini archive to the city; it includes over 1,000 volumes, some 30,000 press clippings and 900 audiovisual items. The sound collections comprise around 6,000 recordings, mostly soundtracks on vinyl and compact disc. The Archivio Videoludico, the first Italian archive dedicated to preserving video games, held more than 5,400 titles as of January 2023.

== Restoration ==
Laboratorio L'Immagine Ritrovata, founded in 1992 and owned by the Cineteca, has made the institution an internationally recognized center for film preservation and restoration; its restorations regularly premiere at Cannes and Venice before circulating to repertory cinemas. It has branches in Paris (L'Image Retrouvée) and Hong Kong (L'Immagine Ritrovata Asia), and around 80 staff restore approximately 140 films a year. The laboratory also hosts the FIAF Film Restoration Summer School, a three-week program for about 40 students.

Major projects include the Chaplin Project, covering the archive of documents and films of Charlie Chaplin, and the Keaton Project, devoted to Buster Keaton. Italian restorations include Federico Fellini's Il bidone, Ermanno Olmi's Il Posto and Pier Paolo Pasolini's Notes Towards an African Orestes.

== Cinemas and other activities ==
The Cineteca runs three cinemas with four screens: the Lumière, whose two screens are named after Marcello Mastroianni and Martin Scorsese; the Cervi; and the Modernissimo. The Cinema Modernissimo, a Liberty-style auditorium beneath Palazzo Ronzani that operated as a cinema from 1915 until 2007, reopened on 21 November 2023 after an extensive restoration.

The institution runs "Schermi e lavagne", a film club for children and teenagers, and free vocational training in film and audiovisual trades supported by the European Social Fund and the Emilia-Romagna region. It also operates Film Commission Bologna, which supports productions shooting in the city, a publishing arm and a theatrical distribution branch.

== Festivals ==
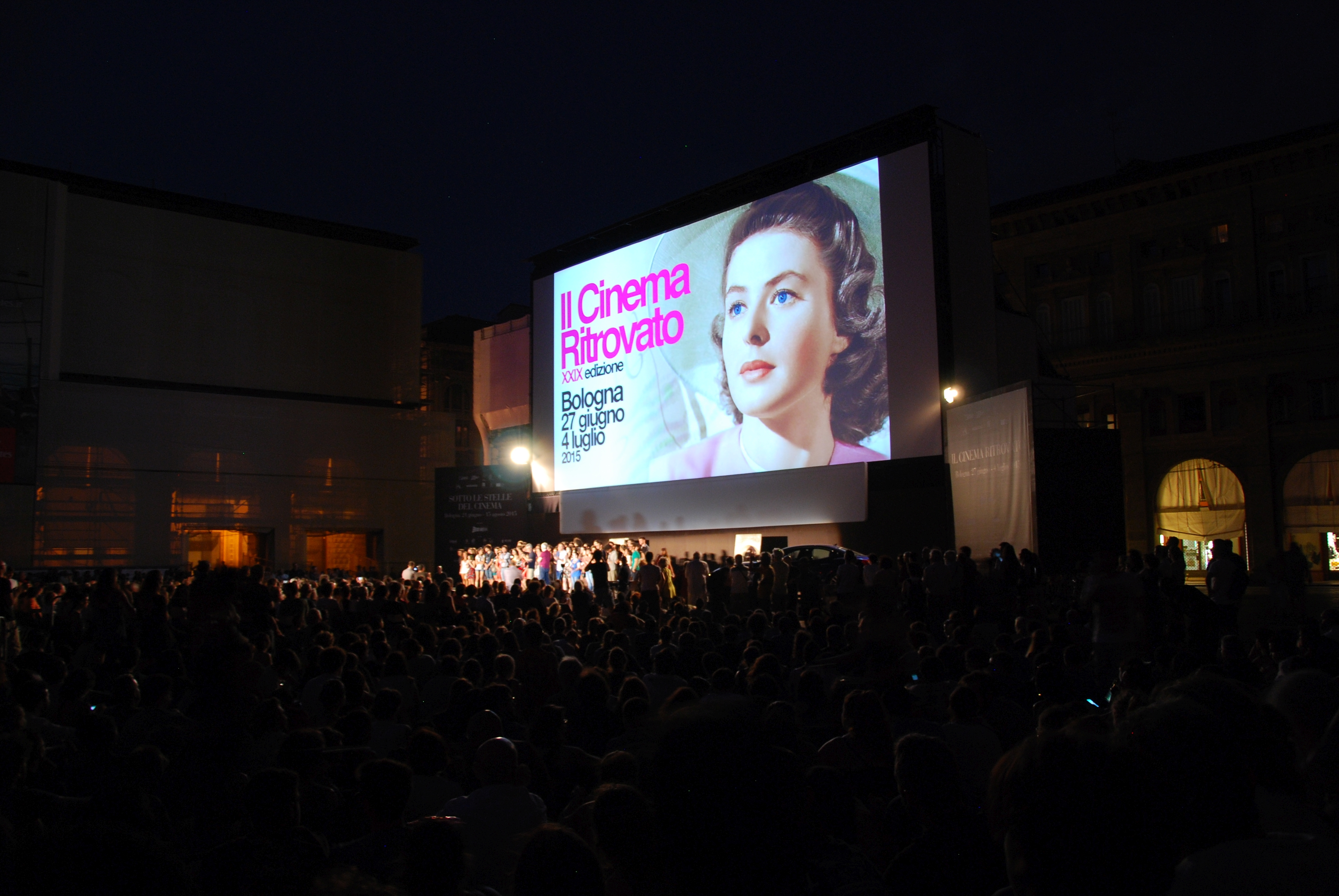
An open-air screening in Piazza Maggiore, Bologna (2015)

Festivals organized by the Cineteca include Il Cinema Ritrovato, Visioni Italiane and the Human Rights Nights Film Festival.

Il Cinema Ritrovato, dedicated to rare, little-known and restored films with particular attention to early cinema, has been held since 1986, when it succeeded the Mostra del Cinema Libero of Porretta. It takes place in late June and early July in the historic center of Bologna, including open-air screenings in Piazza Maggiore. The Finnish critic Peter von Bagh was artistic director from 2001 until his death in 2014; the festival is now directed by Gian Luca Farinelli, Cecilia Cenciarelli, Ehsan Khoshbakht and Mariann Lewinsky.

== See also ==
- List of film archives
