= List of compositions by Mikhail Ippolitov-Ivanov =

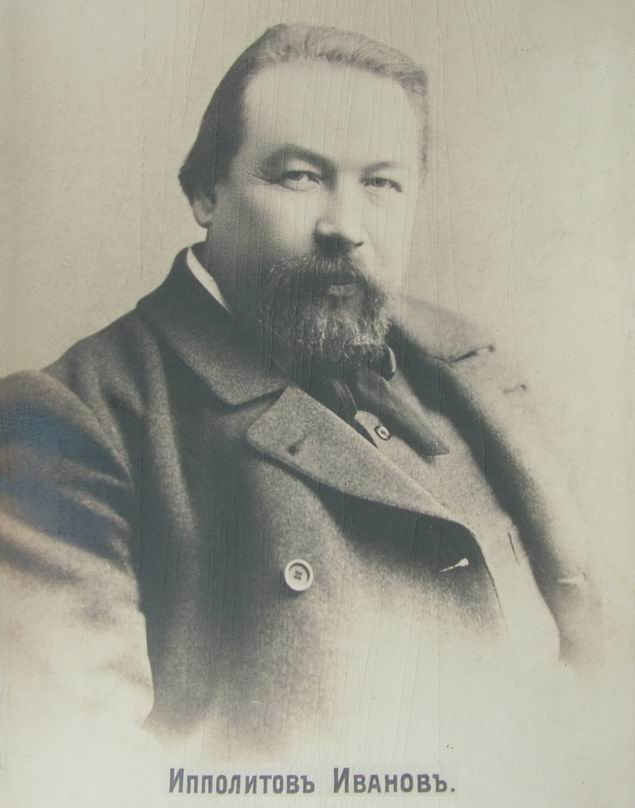

This is a list of compositions by Mikhail Ippolitov-Ivanov. Dates indicate the year of composition. Dates with an asterisk (1895*) may need revising.

== Works by category ==
=== Works for orchestra ===
- Op. 1: Yar-khmel ("Spring") Overture, unpublished (1881)
- Op. 2: Scherzo for large orchestra, unpublished (after 1881*)
- – Nine Caucasian Dances for Georgian folk instruments and performers (1883)
- Op. 10: Caucasian Sketches, Suite No. 1 (1894)
  1. In a Mountain Pass
  2. In the Village
  3. In the Mosque
  4. Procession of the Sardar
- Op. 34: Sinfonietta for orchestra (arrangement for large orchestra of Violin Sonata Op. 8) (1902*)
- Op. 42: Caucasian Sketches, Suite No. 2 "Iveria" (1896)
  1. Introduction (Lamentation of the Princess Ketevana)
  2. Berceuse
  3. Lezghinka
  4. Georgian March
- Op. 46: Symphony No. 1 in E minor (1907)
  1. Adagio - Allegro risoluto
  2. Scherzo: Allegro
  3. Elegy: Larghetto
  4. Finale: Allegro moderato
- Op. 48: Armenian Rhapsody on National Themes, for orchestra (1895)
- Op. 50: On the Volga, musical picture for orchestra (1910*)
- Op. 55: Turkish March, for large orchestra (also for concert band) (1926)
- Op. 56: From the Songs of Ossian - 3 musical pictures for large orchestra (1925)
  1. Lake Lyano
  2. Kolyma's Lament
  3. Ossian's Monologue on Contemporary Heroes
- Op. 62: Turkish Fragments - Orchestral Suite No. 3 (1930)
  1. The Caravan
  2. In the Encampment
  3. At Night
  4. At the Festival
- Op. 65: On the Steppes of Turkmenistan - Orchestral Suite No. 4 (1935)
- Op. 67: Jubilee March ded. Voroshilov - for the 15th anniversary of the 1917 Revolution, for large orchestra (also arr. piano) (1933)
- Op. 69: Musical Paintings from Uzbekistan - Orchestral Suite No. 5 (1935*)
- – Symphony No. 2 "Karelia", without Opus no. (1935)
- Op. 79: Catalan Suite for orchestra (1932*)

=== Film music ===
- Music for the silent film Stenka Razin (directed by Vladimir Romashkov) (1908)
- Music for the lost silent film Song About the Merchant Kalashnikov (directed by Vasily Goncharov) (1909)
- Music for the silent film Volga and Siberia (aka Yermak Timofeyevich) (dir. Vasily Goncharov) (1914)
- – Music for the unreleased film Kara-bugaz (Black Mouth) (dir. Aleksandr Razumny) (1934)

=== Works for soloist and orchestra ===
- Op. 54: Mtsyri, symphonic poem for soprano and orchestra, (after Mikhail Lermontov) (also arr. soprano and piano) (1923 - 1924)
- Op. 61: An Episode from the Life of Franz Schubert: Symphonic Picture for Tenor (ad lib.) and large orchestra (1928)
- Op. 64: Village Evenings: Fantasy on themes for balalaikas and large orchestra (also for balalaikas and piano) (1934*)

=== Operas ===
- Op. 6: Ruth (opera after Tolstoy and Ostrovsky) (1883 - 1886)
- – Azra (opera after a Moorish legend and Mickiewicz) without Opus no. (destroyed by the composer) (1888 - 1890)
- Op. 30: Assya (opera after Manykin-Nevstruev and Turgenev) (1900)
- Op. 43: Treason (opera after Aleksandr Sumbatov-Yuzhin) (1908 - 1909)
- Op. 53: Ole from the North Country (opera, libretto by Ippolitov-Ivanov after M. Jersen) (1915, fp 1916)
- Op. 70: Marriage (orchestration of Mussorgsky's opera after Gogol) (1931)
- Op. 74: The Last Barricade (opera after Nikolai Kratsyeninnikov) (1933)

=== Works for choir & orchestra ===
- Op. 12: Welcoming Cantata for the Coronation of Nicholas II. for two-part children's choir and orchestra (1895)
- Op. 18: Five Characteristic Pictures, for choir and orchestra (also for piano) (1897)
  1. Rusalki
  2. Peasant melody
  3. Berber melody
  4. Nocturne
  5. Spring
- Op. 59: Hymn to Work, for two-part children's chorus, concert band and orchestra (1927)
- Op. 71: The Year 1917, (Anniversary March) for children's and mixed choir, concert band and orchestra (also arr. piano) (1932)

=== Other works for chorus ===
- Op. 15a: Alsatian Ballade, for mixed choir (or women) (1896)
- Op. 16: Ten two-part choruses for female voices and piano (1896)
- Op. 17: Five four-part choruses, for mixed choir (after Kozlov) (1896)
- Op. 24: Legend of the White Swan of Novgorod, for mixed choir (1898)
- Op. 26: Cantata in Memory of Pushkin, for children's choir with piano (or harmonium) (1899)
- Op. 29: Two evening meal verses (Psalm 132 and Psalm 133), for mixed choir (1899)
- Op. 32: Five Choruses, for three-part children's or women's choir and piano, unpublished (1901*)
- Op. 35: Cantata in Memory of Vasily Zhukovsky (after Weinberg), for mixed choir and piano (1902)
- Op. 37: Liturgy of St. John Chrysostom, for mixed chorus (1903)
- Op. 38: Five Cherubic Hymns, for female chorus (1903)
- Op. 39; Pythagorean Hymn to the Rising Sun, (after Amfiteatrov) for mixed chorus, ten flutes, two harps and organ (1904)
- Op. 43a: Selected prayers from the All-Night Vigil (Vespers), for mixed choir (1909*)
- Op. 47: Cantata for the 100th anniversary of Gogol, for two-part children's chorus with piano (1909)
- Op. 49: Kontakion for the Holy Apostle Matthew, for cantor and mixed choir (1910*)
- Op. 51: Fifteen children's choruses (after Nekrasov) (1910*)
- Op. 54a: Troparion to Celebrate the Phenomenon of the Icons of the Mother of God in the city of Kazan, for mixed choir and piano (1925*)
- Op. 75: Three Vocal Quartets for male chorus and piano (after Rodionov) (1931)

=== Solo vocal music ===
- Op. 3: Ten children's songs (1881)
- Op. 4: Seven songs (after Pushkin and Lermontov) (1881*)
- Op. 5: Four Romances for voice and piano (1886)
- Op. 11: Suite, for voice and piano (1885)
- Op. 14: Twelve Georgian Folk-Songs for voice and piano (1895)
- Op. 14a: Six Songs (after Balmont) (1896)
- Op. 15: Three Songs for voice and piano (1896)
- Op. 21: Six Romances (after Rathaus) (1897)
- Op. 22: Six Romances (after Golenishchev-Kutusov) (1897)
- Op. 23: Three Moorish Melodies (after Spanish folk texts tr. Botkin) (1897)
- Op. 25: Five Duets for mezzo-soprano, viola and piano (after Rathaus) (1898)
- Op. 27: Two Romances (after Zhukovsky) for voice and piano (1899)
- Op. 28: Five Romances (after Maikov) for voice and piano (1899)
- Op. 31: Four Songs (after Amfiteatrov) for voice and piano (1901)
- Op. 33: Six Romances (after Rathaus) for voice and piano (1901)
- Op. 40: Five Biblical Songs for voice and piano (1904)
- Op. 41: Seven Psalms of King David, for voice and piano (or harp) (1905)
- Op. 44: Five Songs (after D. Zerteljew) for voice and piano, unpublished (1909*)
- Op. 45: Ten Shakespeare Sonnets for voice and piano(1913)
- Op. 52: Four Duets (after Maikov) for voices and piano, unpublished (1910*)
- Op. 53a: Four Songs from Provence (after Paul Verlaine tr. Larin) for voice and piano (1916*)
- Op. 58: Three Songs for voice and piano (1925*)
- Op. 60: Five Japanese poems (after Tomonori & anon. tr. Gluskina) for voice and piano (1928)
- Op. 63: Four Songs for voice, violin, cello and piano (after Solovyov) (1933)
- Op. 66: Two Bylinki (Folk Epics) - songs for voice and piano (1933)
- Op. 68: Four Poems (after Tagore), for high voice, flute (or violin) and piano (or harp) (1935)
- Op. 72: Five Romances for voice, violin, cello and piano (1932)
- Op. 73: Two Duets for high and low voice with piano (after Rodionov) (1932)
- – Three Kirgiz Songs for voice, flute oboe, clarinet and bassoon, without Opus no. (1931)

=== Chamber music ===
- Op. 8: Violin Sonata (1895)
- Op. 9: Piano Quartet (1895*)
- Op. 13: String Quartet in A minor (1894)
- Op. 19: Desire, for cello and piano (later revised as Op. 57) (1897)
- Op. 20: Romantic Ballad - Suite for violin and piano (1898)
- Op. 57: Desire, for cello and piano, (revised from Op. 19) (1925)
- – Four Pieces on Armenian Themes for string quartet without Opus no. (1934)
- Op. 69a: An Evening in Georgia, for flute, oboe, clarinet, bassoon and harp (1935)

=== Works for piano ===
- Op. 7: Five Small Pieces for piano (1885)

== Works by Opus no. ==
- Op. 1: Yar-khmel ("Spring") Overture, unpublished (1881)
- Op. 2: Scherzo for large orchestra, unpublished (after 1881*)
- Op. 3: Ten children's songs (1881)
- Op. 4: Seven songs (after Pushkin and Lermontov) (1881*)
- – Nine Caucasian Dances for Georgian folk instruments and performers (1883)
- Op. 5: Four Romances for voice and piano (1886)
- Op. 6: Ruth (opera after Tolstoy and Ostrovsky) (1883 - 1886)
- Op. 7: Five Small Pieces for piano (1885)
- Op. 8: Violin Sonata (1895)
- Op. 9: Piano Quartet (1895*)
- – Azra (opera after a Moorish legend and Mickiewicz) without Opus no. (destroyed by the composer) (1888 - 1890)
- Op. 10: Caucasian Sketches, Suite No. 1 (1894)
  1. In a Mountain Pass
  2. In the Village
  3. In the Mosque
  4. Procession of the Sardar
- Op. 11: Suite, for voice and piano (1885)
- Op. 12: Welcoming Cantata for the Coronation of Nicholas II. for two-part children's choir and orchestra (1895)
- Op. 13: String Quartet in A minor (1894)
- Op. 14: Twelve Georgian Folk-Songs (1895)
- Op. 14a: Six Songs (after Balmont) (1896)
- Op. 15: Three Songs for voice and piano (1896)
- Op. 15a: Alsatian Ballade, for mixed choir (or women) (1896)
- Op. 16: Ten two-part choruses for female voices and piano (1896)
- Op. 17: Five four-part choruses, for mixed choir (after Kozlov) (1896)
- Op. 18: Five Characteristic Pictures, for choir and orchestra (also for piano) (1897)
  1. Rusalki
  2. Peasant melody
  3. Berber melody
  4. Nocturne
  5. Spring
- Op. 19: Desire, for cello and piano (later revised as Op.57) (1897)
- Op. 20: Romantic Ballad - Suite for violin and piano (1898)
- Op. 21: Six Romances (after Rathaus) (1897)
- Op. 22: Six Romances (after Golenishchev-Kutusov) (1897)
- Op. 23: Three Moorish Melodies (after Spanish folk texts tr. Botkin) (1897)
- Op. 24: Legend of the White Swan of Novgorod, for mixed choir (1898)
- Op. 25: Five Duets for mezzo-soprano, viola and piano (after Rathaus) (1898)
- Op. 26: Cantata in Memory of Pushkin, for children's choir with piano (or harmonium) (1899)
- Op. 27: Two Romances (after Zhukovsky) for voice and piano (1899)
- Op. 28: Five Romances (after Maikov) for voice and piano (1899)
- Op. 29: Two evening meal verses (Psalm 132 and Psalm 133), for mixed choir (1899)
- Op. 30: Assya (opera after Manykin-Nevstruev and Turgenev) (1900)
- Op. 31: Four Songs (after Amfiteatrov) for voice and piano (1901)
- Op. 32: Five Choruses, for three-part children's or women's choir and piano, unpublished (1901*)
- Op. 33: Six Romances (after Rathaus) for voice and piano (1901)
- Op. 34: Sinfonietta for orchestra (arrangement for large orchestra of Violin Sonata Op. 8) (1902*)
- Op. 35: Cantata in Memory of Vasily Zhukovsky (after Weinberg), for mixed choir and piano (1902)
- Op. 36: Potěmkinovy prázdniny, opera (1902*)
- Op. 37: Liturgy of St. John Chrysostom, for mixed chorus (1903)
- Op. 38: Five Cherubic Hymns, for female chorus (1903)
- Op. 39; Pythagorean Hymn to the Rising Sun, (after Amfiteatrov) for mixed chorus, ten flutes, two harps and organ (1904)
- Op. 40: Five Biblical Songs for voice and piano (1904)
- Op. 41: Seven Psalms of King David, for voice and piano (or harp) (1905)
- Op. 42: Caucasian Sketches, Suite No. 2 (1896)
  1. Introduction (Lamentation of the Princess Ketevana)
  2. Berceuse
  3. Lezghinka
  4. Georgian War March

- Music for the silent film Stenka Razin (directed by Vladimir Romashkov) (1908)

- Op. 43: Treason (opera after Aleksandr Sumbatov-Yuzhin) (1908 - 1909)
- Op. 43a: Selected prayers from the All-Night Vigil (Vespers), for mixed choir (1909*)

- Music for the lost silent film Song About the Merchant Kalashnikov (Vasily Goncharov) (1909)

- Op. 44: Five Songs (after D. Zerteljew) for voice and piano, unpublished (1909*)
- Op. 45: Ten Shakespeare Sonnets for voice and piano(1913)
- Op. 46: Symphony No. 1 in E minor (1907)
  1. Adagio - Allegro risoluto
  2. Scherzo: Allegro
  3. Elegy: Larghetto
  4. Finale: Allegro moderato
- Op. 47: Cantata for the 100th anniversary of Gogol, for two-part children's chorus with piano (1909)
- Op. 48: Armenian Rhapsody on National Themes, for orchestra (1895)
- Op. 49: Kontakion for the Holy Apostle Matthew, for cantor and mixed choir (1910*)
- Op. 50: On the Volga, musical picture for orchestra (1910*)
- Op. 51: Fifteen children's choruses (after Nekrasov) (1910*)
- Op. 52: Four Duets (after Maikov) for voices and piano, unpublished (1910*)

- Music for the silent film Volga and Siberia (aka Yermak Timofeyevich) (Vasily Goncharov) (1914)

- Op. 53: Ole from the North Country (opera, libretto by Ippolitov-Ivanov after M. Jersen) (1915, fp 1916)
- Op. 53a: Four Songs from Provence (after Paul Verlaine tr. Larin) for voice and piano (1916*)
- Op. 54: Mtsïri, symphonic poem for soprano and orchestra, (after Lermontov) (also arr. soprano and piano) (1923 - 1924)
- Op. 54a: Troparion to Celebrate the Phenomenon of the Icons of the Mother of God in the city of Kazan, for mixed choir and piano (1925*)
- Op. 55: Turkish March, for large orchestra (also for concert band) (1926)
- Op. 56: From the Songs of Ossian - 3 musical pictures for large orchestra (1925)
  1. Lake Lyano
  2. Kolyma's Lament
  3. Ossian's Monologue on Contemporary Heroes
- Op. 57: Desire, for cello and piano, (revised from Op. 19) (1925)
- Op. 58: Three Songs for voice and piano (1925*)
- Op. 59: Hymn to Work, for two-part children's chorus, concert band and orchestra (1927)
- Op. 60: Five Japanese poems (after Tomonori & anon. tr. Gluskina) for voice and piano (1928)
- Op. 61: An Episode from the Life of Franz Schubert: Symphonic Picture for Tenor (ad lib.) and large orchestra (1928)
- Op. 62: Turkish Fragments - Orchestral Suite No. 3 (1930)
  1. The Caravan
  2. In the Encampment
  3. At Night
  4. At the Festival
- Op. 63: Four Songs for voice, violin, cello and piano (after Solovyov) (1933)
- – Four Pieces on Armenian Themes for string quartet without Opus no. (1934)
- Op. 64: Village Evenings: Fantasy on themes for balalaikas and large orchestra (also for balalaikas and piano) (1934*)
- Op. 65: On the Steppes of Turkmenistan - Orchestral Suite No. 4 (1935)
- Op. 66: Two Bylinki (Folk Epics) - songs for voice and piano (1933)
- Op. 67: Jubilee March ded. Voroshilov - for the 15th anniversary of the 1917 Revolution, for large orchestra (also arr. piano) (1933)
- Op. 68: Four Poems (after Tagore), for high voice, flute (or violin) and piano (or harp) (1935)
- Op. 69: Musical Paintings from Uzbekistan - Orchestral Suite No. 5 (1935*)
- Op. 69a: An Evening in Georgia, for flute, oboe, clarinet, bassoon and harp (1935)
- – Symphony No. 2 "Karelia", without Opus no. (1935)
- Op. 70: Marriage (orchestration of Mussorgsky's opera after Gogol) (1931)
- Op. 71: The Year 1917, (Anniversary March) for children's and mixed choir, concert band and orchestra (also arr. piano) (1932)
- Op. 72: Five Romances for voice, violin, cello and piano (1932)
- Op. 73: Two Duets for high and low voice with piano (after Rodionov) (1932)
- Op. 74: The Last Barricade (opera after Nikolai Kratsyeninnikov) (1932*)
- Op. 75: Three Vocal Quartets for male chorus and piano (after Rodionov) (1931)
- – Three Kirgiz Songs for voice, flute oboe, clarinet and bassoon, without Opus no. (1931)
- Op. 79: Catalan suite for orchestra (1932*)
- – Music for the film Karabugaz (piano score) (Unreleased) (1934)

=== Opus numbers not in the list ===
- Op. 36: (1902*)
- Op. 76: (1932*)
- Op. 77: (1932*)
- Op. 78: (1932*)
