= Sukhovo-Kobylin affair =

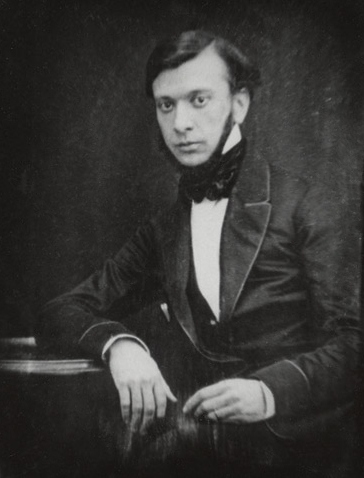
Aleksandr Sukhovo-Kobylin in a daguerreotype from the 1850s

The Sukhovo-Kobylin affair was the case surrounding the murder on November 7, 1850, of Louise Simon-Dimanche, a French milliner living in Moscow, in which Aleksandr Sukhovo-Kobylin, a playwright and Simon-Dimanche's presumed lover, was one of the suspects. The investigation lasted from 1850 to 1857, and Sukhovo-Kobylin was arrested twice. During his imprisonment he completed work on his first play, Krechinsky's Wedding. Among the other suspects were Simon-Dimanche's servants, as well as Nadezhda Naryshkina, a lady from Moscow high society who left Russia after her interrogation and went to France.

The investigators included the Moscow chief of police Ivan Luzhin, the Moscow Governor-General Arseny Zakrevsky, the Minister of Justice Viktor Panin, and members of the Governing Senate and State Council. Eventually both Sukhovo-Kobylin and Simon-Dimanche's servants were acquitted. The verdict passed by the State Council never identified the murderer. The process attracted a great deal of public attention and left an imprint on the playwright's work.

== Death of Louise Simon-Dimanche ==
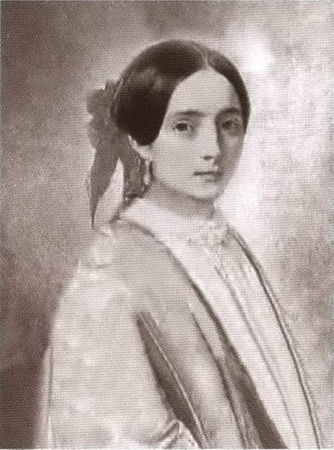
Supposed portrait of Louise Simon-Dimanche

Louise Simon-Dimanche, who had immigrated to Russia from France in 1842, lived in a five-room apartment in Count Gudovich's house on the corner of Tverskaya Street (the building was later moved to Bryusov pereulok, 21), which was rented for her by Sukhovo-Kobylin. In the evening of November 7, 1850, she went out into the street and did not return home. The next morning, when Sukhovo-Kobylin did not find her in the apartment, he organized a private search, by sending a courier to a lady who knew Louise and visiting friends who might have known her whereabouts. The servants maintained that their master "had never before been so alarmed about the absence of Dimanche". In the afternoon of November 9, Sukhovo-Kobylin went to a meeting of the Merchants' Assembly, where he found the Moscow chief of police Ivan Luzhin and informed him of his concern about Simon-Demanche's fate. Luzhin gave an order to question cab drivers, but none of them could remember a passenger "in a fur coat and hat".

On the same day, the Cossack Andrei Petryakov discovered the body of a woman about thirty-five years old lying in a snowdrift near the Vagankovo Cemetery. According to the police report, the deceased was of medium height and was wearing a green checkered dress, white silk stockings and black velvet half-boots, as well as gold and diamond earrings on her ears and rings on her hands. Her braided brown hair was fastened with a "tortoiseshell comb missing a tooth". In the victim's pocket there was a set of "internal keys of various sizes". Equally detailed was the report of Dr. Tikhomirov, who established during his examination that there was "a transverse wound with ragged edges about three vershoks [13 cm] long, around the throat, on the front of the neck". Near the body were the tracks of a sledge; judging by the horses' footprints, the carriage first turned away from the road and then headed towards Moscow.

Soon the police chief Luzhin received a document stating that Sukhovo-Kobylin's serfs, Galaktion Kozmin and Ignat Makarov, had identified the dead woman as the "foreigner Louise Ivanovna, who lived in Gudovich's house". Announcing an investigation into the murder of Simon-Dimanche, Luzhin advised the members of the commission to look into the behavior of the retired titular councillor Sukhovo-Kobylin, who in a private conversation had given correct directions for the searches for the missing woman and had "repeatedly expressed fears that she had been killed".

== Suspects ==
=== Aleksandr Sukhovo-Kobylin ===
Juri Lotman describes Sukhovo-Kobylin as a man with a "contradictory mind", in which the rigidity of the "Europeanized feudal lord" was combined with the desire to keep pace with the times; he carried out progressive economic reforms on his estates while preserving "an idealized idea of patriarchal relations". He was well educated, had success with the ladies, and was an inveterate gambler, although in high society, according to his neighbor Aleksandr Mikhailovich Rembelynsky, he kept himself apart and did not enjoy much sympathy. His sister, the writer Evgenia Tur, characterized him as hot-blooded and uncontrollable: he showed no mercy to his servants who made mistakes and sometimes broke plates at dinner "because of a dish he did not like". The writer Evgeny Feoktistov in his memoirs described Sukhovo-Kobylin as a ruthless and cold landowner:

This gentleman, who spoke excellent French and had mastered gentlemanly manners, was in fact instinctually a cruel savage who did not hesitate to abuse serfdom in any way. His household trembled... Aleksandr Kobylin could boast of a number of love affairs, but they also ruined him.

Sukhovo-Kobylin met Louise Simon-Dimanche in 1841 in Paris. According to the journalist Vlas Doroshevich, their meeting took place at a restaurant. When the young woman reported that she could not find work that suited her, Sukhovo-Kobylin suggested that she move to Russia and gave her a thousand francs for travel expenses. In the fall of 1842, the Parisian milliner came first to St. Petersburg and then to Moscow. Sukhovo-Kobylin rented an apartment for her on Tverskaya Street, where she had the whole first floor to herself. He also provided servants for her from among his own serfs, as well as funds to open a wine shop and grocery store. In 1849, according to Sukhovo-Kobylin's testimony, the "Moscow merchant Luiza Ivanovna" was forced to withdraw from business "because of a lack of commerce"; from that time she was supported exclusively by him. According to the literary scholar Stanislav Rassadin, the couple's former idyll, despite frequent dinners together, gradually disappeared. In 1850 a new woman appeared in Sukhovo-Kobylin's life: Nadezhda Ivanovna Naryshkina.

=== Nadezhda Naryshkina ===
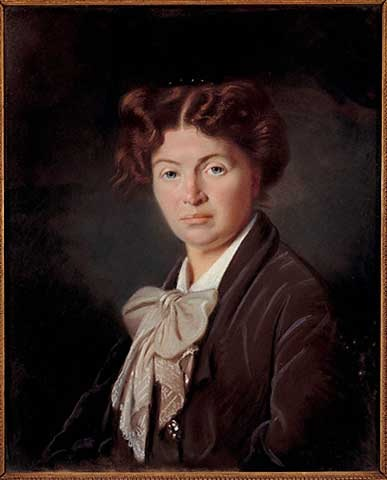
Nadezhda Naryshkina (1864)

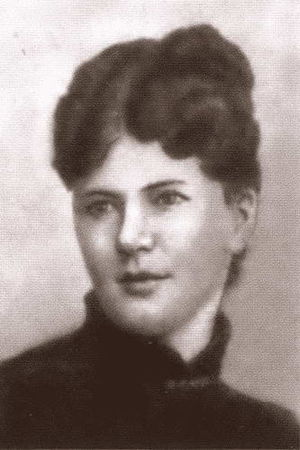
Luiza Sukhovo-Kobylina (1870)

Nadezhda Ivanovna Naryshkina (née Baroness Knorring) at the time of her acquaintance with Sukhovo-Kobylin was married to Prince Aleksandr Grigoryevich Naryshkin. She was a high-society lady who did not lack for suitors, though she was not considered a beauty: contemporaries described her as a woman "of small stature, reddish-haired, with irregular features". At the same time, she possessed "a sort of peculiar grace", knew how to conduct conversations, and was very confident. Seeing how much Sukhovo-Kobylin was suffering because of Simon-Dimanche's death, Naryshkina took upon herself part of the funeral preparations. Eyewitnesses said that she provided substantial support.

From the day when the murder became known, she almost never left Kobylin's side, was constantly in the company of his relatives, and bravely stopped worrying about what people would think. She selflessly plunged into his grief, which expressed itself openly and strongly.

Naryshkina was being investigated for two reasons: a rumor linked her with the murder, and the servants testified that Louise was jealous of her rival. Evgenii Feoktistov recalled that in those days "Naryshkina became the talk of the town, and her husband was going through a terrible time". Leo Tolstoy reported a rumor that had Moscow in a flurry in a letter to his relative Tatyana Yergolskaya: "When Kobylin was arrested, they discovered letters from Naryshkina in which she reproached him for leaving her and threatened Ms. Simon... They believe that the murderers were sent by Naryshkina.

=== Simon-Dimanche's servants ===
Among the other suspects were Louise Simon-Dimanche's servants—Sukhovo-Kobylin's household serfs, who had sent them to Bryusov Lane to do the housekeeping. They consisted of the 20-year-old cook Yefim Yegorov, trained in one of the best Petersburg kitchens, the 18-year-old coachman Galaktion Kozmin, and two maids: the 27-year-old Agrafena Kashkina and the 50-year-old Pelageya Alekseyeva (who died in 1853 in prison before the verdict was reached). All four were arrested the night after Simon-Dimanche's body was found. The Chief Prosecutor of the Senate, Kastor Nikiforovich Lebedev, who studied the case materials at the request of the Minister of Justice, later wrote:

It is sad to see this gifted Sukhovo-Kobylin engrossed in intrigues, and these serfs given by the master to be slaves to his French mistress.

== Bibliography ==
- Lotman, L. M. "A. V. Sukhovo-Kobylin". In Istoriia russkoi literatury v 4 tomakh, 3:528–48. Leningrad: Nauka, 1982.
- Kleiner, I. M. Sud'ba Sukhovo-Kobylina. Moscow: Nauka, 1969.
- Rassadin, S. B. Genii i zlodeistvo, ili Delo Sukhovo-Kobylina. Moscow: Kniga, 1989. ISBN 5-212-00118-8.
- Otroshenko, V. O. Sukhovo-Kobylin. Moscow: Molodaia gvardiia, 2014. ISBN 978-5-235-03666-6.
- Bessarab, M. Ia. Sukhovo-Kobylin. Moscow: Sovremennik, 1981.
- Gorelov, A. E. Tri sud'by. Moscow: Sovetskii pisatel', 1978.
- Grossman, V. A. Delo Sukhovo-Kobylina. Moscow: Khudozhestvennaia literatura, 1936.
- V. M. Selezniova and E. O. Selezniovoi, eds. Delo Sukhovo-Kobylina. Moscow: Novoe literaturnoe obozrenie, 2002. ISBN 5-86793-210-9.
