= Op. 42 =

In music, Op. 42 stands for Opus number 42. Compositions that are assigned this number include:

- Arnold – Homage to the Queen
- Britten – Saint Nicolas
- Bruch – Romance in A minor
- Busoni – Berceuse élégiaque
- Chopin – Waltz in A-flat major, Op. 42
- Elgar – Diarmuid and Grania
- Glière – Symphony No. 3
- Haydn – String Quartet in D Minor, Op. 42
- Holst – At the Boar's Head
- Ippolitov-Ivanov – Caucasian Sketches, Suite No. 2
- Mendelssohn – Psalm 42
- Nielsen – Fynsk Foraar
- Rachmaninoff – Variations on a Theme of Corelli
- Rautavaara – Études
- Schumann – Frauenliebe und -leben
- Shostakovich – Five Fragments
- Tchaikovsky – Souvenir d'un lieu cher
- Widor – Symphony for Organ No. 5
- Widor – Symphony for Organ No. 6
