= Krechinsky's Wedding (1953 film) =

1953 film by Vasili Vanin

- Directed by: Vasili Vanin; Aleksey Zolotnitskiy
- Written by: Aleksandr Sukhovo-Kobylin (play)
- Cinematography: Leonid Dultsev; Bentsion Monastyrsky
- Edited by: Yevgeniya Abdirkina
- Music by: Vissarion Shebalin
- Production company: Gorky Film Studios
- Release date: 21 December 1953
- Country: Soviet Union
- Language: Russian

Krechinsky's Wedding (Russian: Свадьба Кречинского, romanized: Svadba Krechinskogo) is a Soviet film adaptation of the performance directed by Vasili Vanin in Moscow Pushkin Drama Theatre in 1951. It is based on the play of the same name by Aleksandr Sukhovo-Kobylin. Film adaptation directed by Aleksey Zolotnitskiy in 1953.

== Cast ==
- Yuri Fomichyov
- Viktor Kostetskiy
- Marina Kuznetsova as Lidochka
- Mikhail Nazvanov as Krechinsky
- Vyacheslav Novikov as Fyodor
- Lev Petropavlovski
- Georgiy Petrovskiy as Nakanor Savvich Bek
- Boris Smirnov
- Pavel Tarasov as Rasplyuev
- Olga Vikland as Atueva
- Zoya Vinogradova

== Bibliography ==
- Fortune, Richard. Alexander Sukhovo-Kobylin. Gale, 1982.
