= Evgeny Salias De Tournemire =

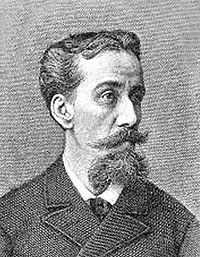
- Born: 25 April 1840; Moscow, Imperial Russia
- Died: 18 December 1908 (aged 68); Moscow, Imperial Russia
- Citizenship: French (originally), Russian (since early 1876)
- Occupation: Novelist • editor
- Relatives: Evgenya Tur (mother); Aleksandr Sukhovo-Kobylin (maternal uncle)
- Writing career
- Pen name: Vadim
- Genre: adventure novel
- Subject: history
- Notable work: The Pugachov's Men (1874)
- Website: az.lib.ru/s/salias_e_a

Count Evgeny Andreyevich Salias de Tournemire (Russian: Евгений Андреевич Салиас-де-Турнемир, 25 April 1840 – 18 December 1908) was a Russian writer, best known for his adventure novels based upon various episodes of Russian history of the 18th and early 19th centuries.

== Biography ==
Evgeny Salias de Tournemire was born in Moscow, to the French citizen, Count Andre Salias de Tournemire, and his Russian wife, Elizaveta Vasilyevna (née Sukhovo-Kobylina), who later became a well-known author in her own right, writing under the pseudonym Evgenya Tur.

After graduating from the Moscow's 3rd Gymnasium in 1859 he enrolled in Moscow University to study law. In 1861 he took part in the students' manifestations and was one of the three envoys chosen to be sent to Saint Petersburg with a petition to Alexander II. Later that year for that very reason he was expelled from the University and in the early 1862 left Russia for France with his mother. It was there that he started to write.

Salias de Tournemire debuted as a published author in 1863 as the then Alexey Pisemsky-led Biblioteka Dlya Chtenya published his debut short novel Xanya the Weird (Ксаня чудная). It was followed by Darkness (Тьма), The Jewess (Еврейка) and Manzhaja (Манжажа), all four lauded by critics. Nikolai Ogaryov, writing to Evgenya Tur, congratulated her with her son's success and expressed delight with the birth of 'a new fine Russian writer'.

Having extensively travelled Spain (this journey resulted in a series of sketches called "Letters from Spain") and Italy (where he met the painter Alexander Ivanov), in 1869 Salias de Tournemire returned to Russia and in 1876 received his Russian citizenship. During the years that preceded it, he worked as a lawyer and state official in Tula and Tambov, respectively, but also wrote Gavriil Derzhavin's biography (The Governor Poet, Поэт-наместник, 1871), a sentimental short novel Pandurochka (Пандурочка), and, most significantly, his first historical novel The Pugachov Men (Пугачёвцы), preceded by an extensive archive research, and visits to the sites of battles fought by Emelyan Pugachov's army. Originally published by Russky vestnik in 1874, the novel enjoyed enormous success with the readership, but received mixed reviews, some critics accusing the author of choosing as a template Lev Tolstoy's War and Peace and following it too obviously.

The same year Salias accepted the offer made to him by the publisher and journalist Mikhail Katkov to become the head of the Russian newspaper Sankt-Peterburgskiye Vedomosti. Later, in 1881, he founded his own short-lived magazine Polyarnaya Zvesda which focused on history and historical literature. Dozens of novels he wrote in 1880s-1890s (including The Orlov Brothers, The Foundling, The Volodimir Princess, The Don Spanyards, and Free Thinkers) only cemented Salias de Tournemire's reputation of the 'best-loved contemporary author in Russia'.

Salias de Tournemire died after prolonged illness in his Moscow house at the Pokrov Levshin region where he spent the last 18 years of his life. He was interred in the Novodevichy Cemetery.

== Legacy ==
Salias de Tournemire's numerous best-selling novels have earned him the widely recognized reputation of the 'Russian Dumas'. Still, the critics refused to give him credit as a serious author, finding most of his novels faulty in terms of historical facts and totally unoriginal. In 1890s the first edition of the Complete Salias De Tournemire in 33 volumes came out. The publication of the second one which started out in 1901, was stopped in 1917, after Volume XX. In the Soviet times his works weren't re-issued, being deemed pro-monarchist and backward-looking.

The interest in Russia for Salias de Tournemire's legacy rose sharply in the 1990s, numerous of his novels (notably, Million, Arakcheyev's Little Offspring and The Krutoyar Princess) were re-issued in 1995, to be followed by several compilations.
