= The Marriage of Krechinsky =

- Russian: Свадьба Кречинского
- Directed by: Alexander Drankov
- Written by: Aleksandr Sukhovo-Kobylin (play)
- Produced by: Alexander Drankov
- Starring: Vladimir Davydov; V. Garlin; A. Novinsky
- Cinematography: Alexander Drankov
- Release date: 1908
- Country: Russian Empire

The Marriage of Krechinsky (Russian: Свадьба Кречинского) is a 1908 Russian comedy short film directed by Alexander Drankov.

== Plot ==
The film is a screen version of a series of scenes from the comedy Krechinsky's Wedding by Aleksandr Sukhovo-Kobylin.

== Cast ==
- Vladimir Davydov as Rasplyuyev
- V. Garlin as Fyodor
- A. Novinsky as Krechinsky
