= Sofia Sukhovo-Kobylina =

Russian artist (1825–1867)

- Софья Васильевна Сухово-Кобылина
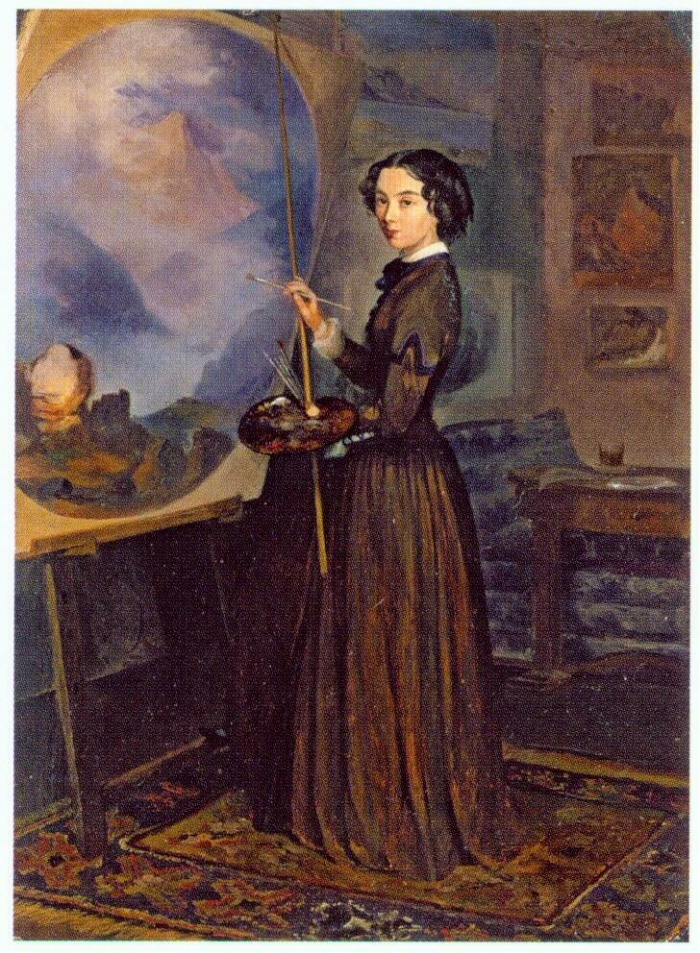
- Self-portrait (1860s)
- Born: 1825; Moscow
- Died: October 7, 1867 (aged 41–42); Rome
- Education: Imperial Academy of Arts (1854)
- Known for: Painting
- Awards: Big Gold Medal of the Imperial Academy of Arts (1854)

Sofia Vasilievna Sukhovo-Kobylina (Russian: Софья Васильевна Сухово-Кобылина; 1825, Moscow - 7 October 1867) was a Russian painter. She was the first woman to graduate with honors from the Imperial Academy of Arts. Her sister, Evgenia Tur, and brother, Alexander Sukhovo-Kobylin, were both well-known writers.

== Biography ==
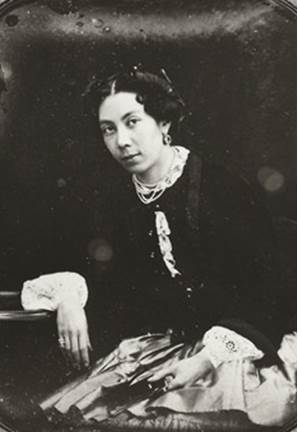
Sofia Sukhovo-Kobylina (early 1850s)

She was born to wealthy landowning family. Her father, Vasily (1782-1873), was a Marshal of Nobility, and participant in the War of 1812. She and her siblings were educated at home by professors from Moscow University. After deciding on a career as an artist, she received lessons from the landscape painter, Yegor Meyer. Convinced that she had talent, he lobbied for her admission to the Imperial Academy. In 1849, one of her works was highly praised at an Academy exhibition.

From 1850 to 1851, she accompanied Meyer and some of his other students on a trip to Italy. A painting she sent back to the Academy as an examination piece was awarded a silver medal. From 1852 to 1853, she went on another trip with Meyer; this time to Crimea. A painting she sent back from there was awarded a gold medal. She graduated in 1854 with another gold medal and executed a painting that showed herself receiving the medal, as a message that this academic path was now open to women.

In 1857, she went to live in Rome and her home became a gathering place for Russian artists visiting Italy. While there, she gradually moved away from landscape painting in favor of portraits. She also wrote essays for Russian magazines about famous Russians who visited or lived in Rome, many of which are still valuable to historians.

Information on the last months of her life are contradictory. The Brockhaus and Efron Encyclopedic Dictionary says she died in Rome, while the Russian Biographical Dictionary says that she left Rome for her father's estate near Kobylinka shortly before her death.

A major retrospective was held at the Imperial Academy in 1868 and over 150 of her works were sold; the majority of them landscapes of Italy and portraits of famous Italians. Most of her paintings remain in private collections.

== Selected paintings ==
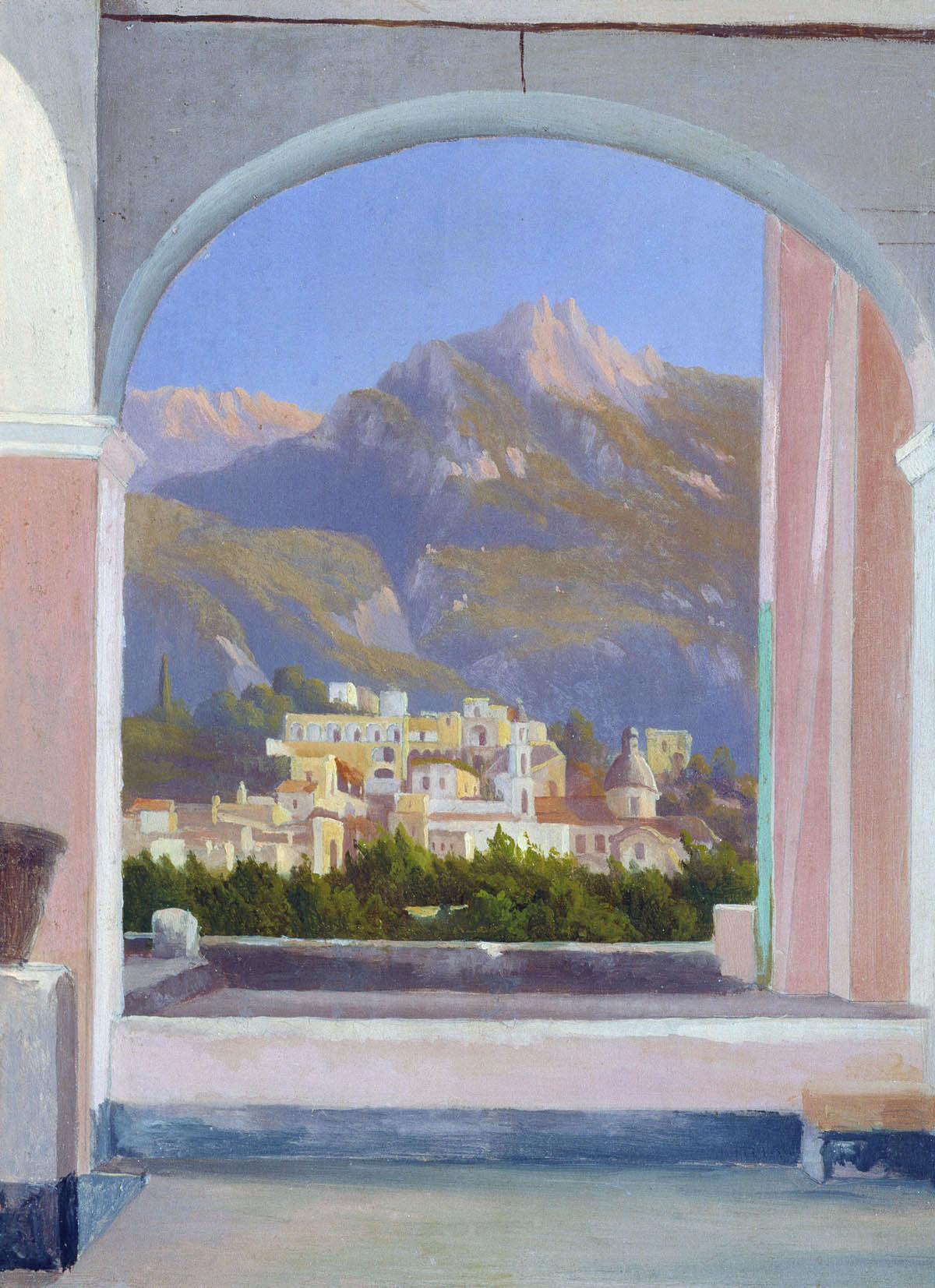
Italian landscape

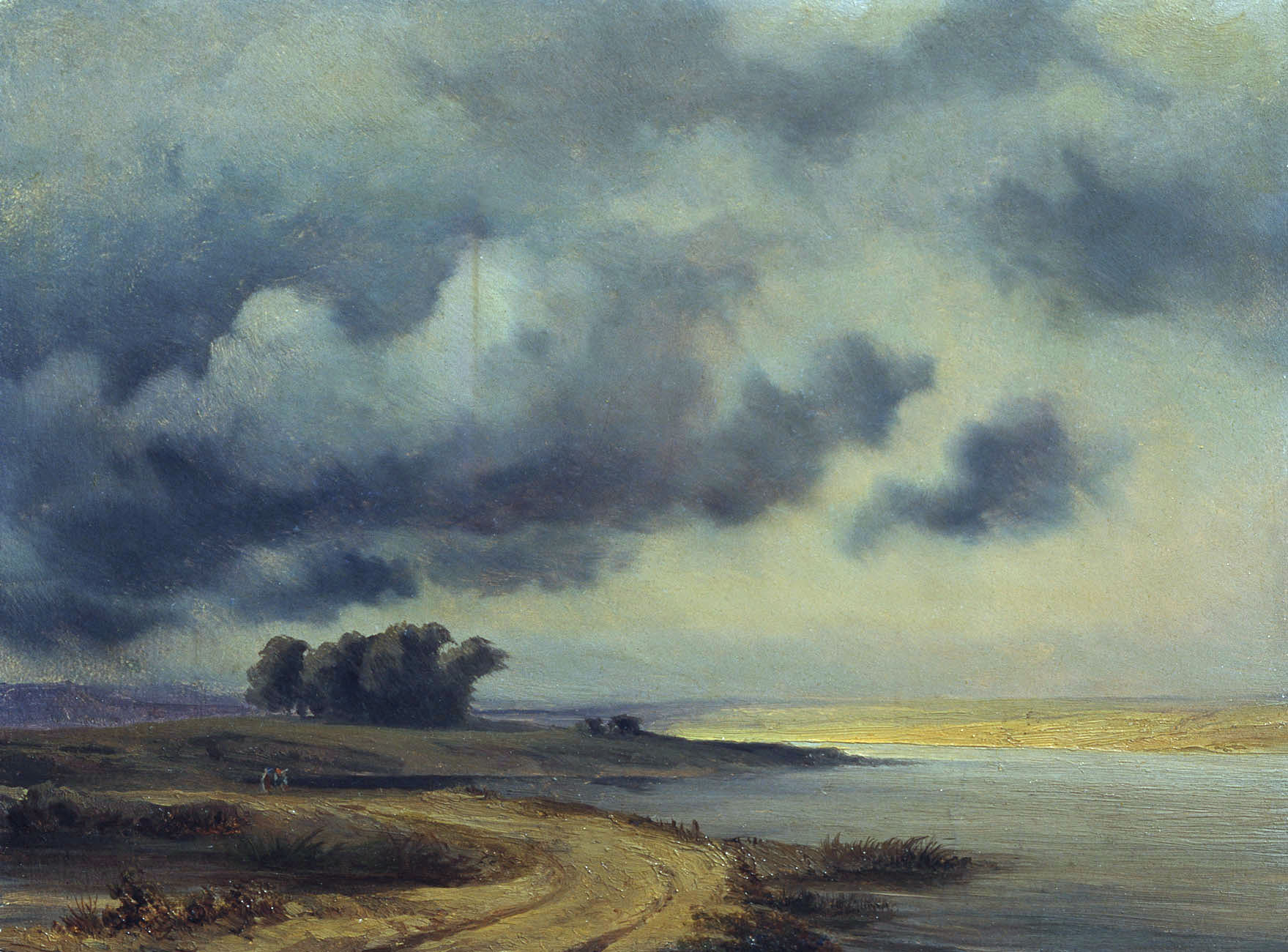
Before the storm

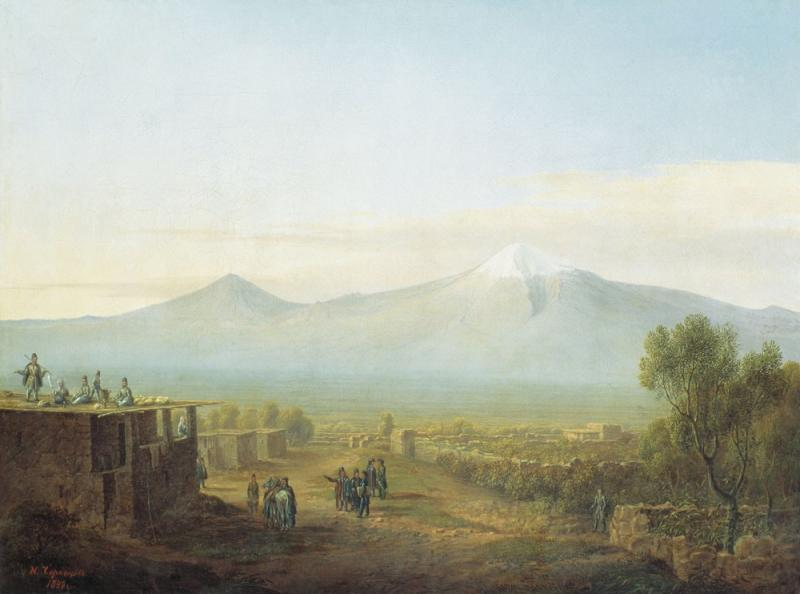
Italian landscape (etude)

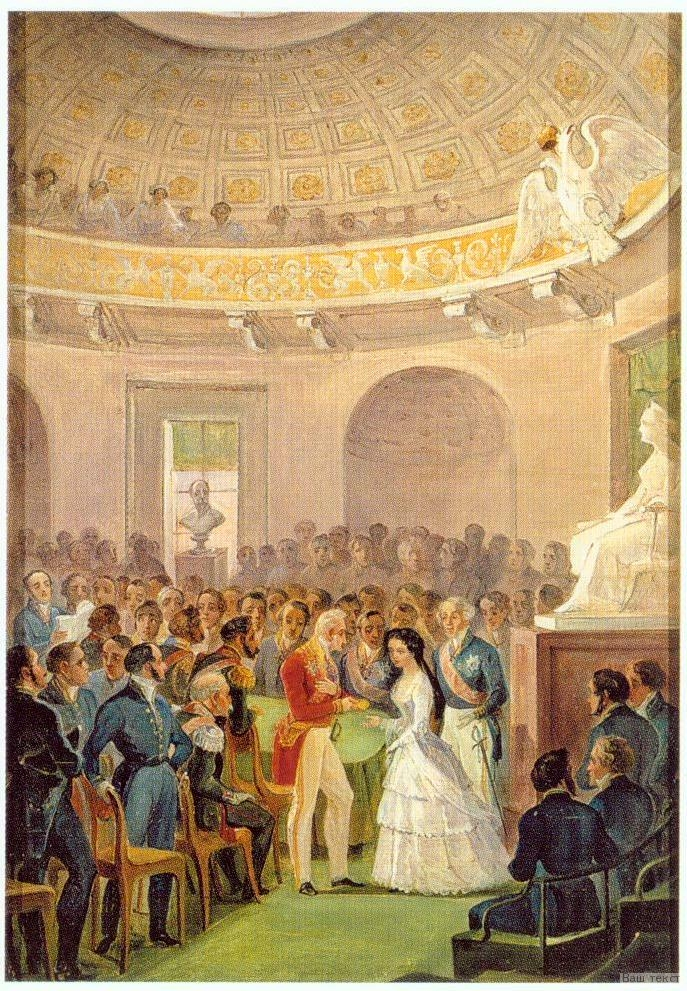
Self-depiction of
her graduation from
the Academy
