= Scenes from the Past =

Trilogy of satirical plays by Alexander Sukhovo-Kobylin

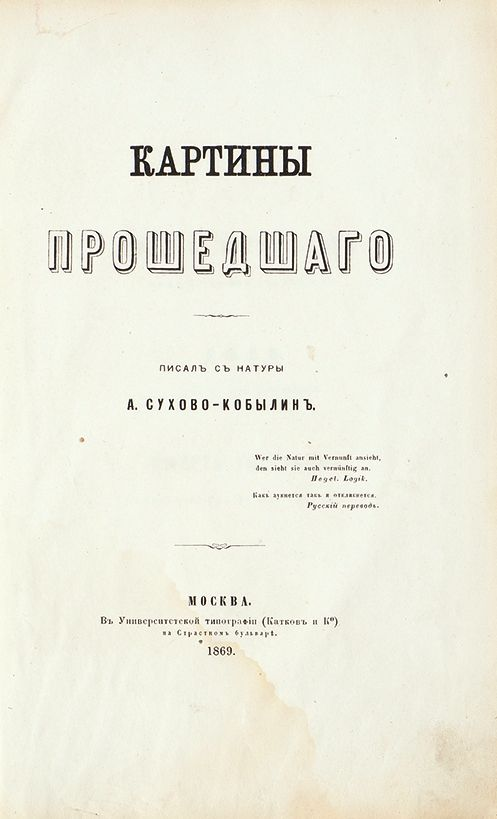
- First Russian edition of the trilogy
- Written by: Alexander Sukhovo-Kobylin
- Original language: Russian

Premiere
- Date premiered: 1855 (Krechinsky's Wedding); 1881 (The Trial); 1900 (Tarelkin's Death)
- Place premiered: Maly Theatre, Moscow, Russia

Scenes from the Past (or Pictures of the Past; Russian: Картины прошедшего, romanized: Kartiny proshedshego, first published in English as The Trilogy of Alexander Sukhovo-Kobylin) is a trilogy of satirical plays by Alexander Sukhovo-Kobylin, written from 1854 to 1869. The first play, Krechinsky's Wedding (Russian: Свадьба Кречинского), was written in 1854 during Sukhovo-Kobylin's imprisonment, premiered in 1855 and published in Sovremennik magazine in 1856. The second play, The Trial (Russian: Дело), was written in 1858 an premiered only in 1881, as hadn't passed the censorship. The last play of the trilogy, Tarelkin's Death (Russian: Смерть Тарелкина), was written in 1869 and premiered only in 1900.

== Background ==
In 1850 Sukhovo-Kobylin gets arrested as a suspect in the murder of his French mistress Louise-Simone Dimanche. Five of his serfs have testified his culpability during police interrogations. As it was established later, their testimonies were false and extorted by torture. To get himself distracted from dark thoughts, Sukhovo-Kobylin writes a comedy Krechinsky's Wedding. In 1855 the play stages in Maly theatre and becomes one of the most performed plays of Russia.

As Sukhovo-Kobylin wrote himself, he only managed to achieve acquittal by means of giving enormous bribes to court officials and by using all of his contacts in the Russian elite. In 1858 he completes the second play in the trilogy, The Trial (or The Case), based on his imprisonment experience. The play was banned for staging by censorship until 1881, although it was published as a print with other parts of the trilogy in 1869 by Mikhail Katkov.

The final and the most grotesque play in the trilogy, Tarelkin's Death he writes in 1869. It was approved by censorship to stage only in 1900 with various edits. Russian literary critic Varvara Babitskaya compares it to Franz Kafka's absurdist works.

== Main characters ==
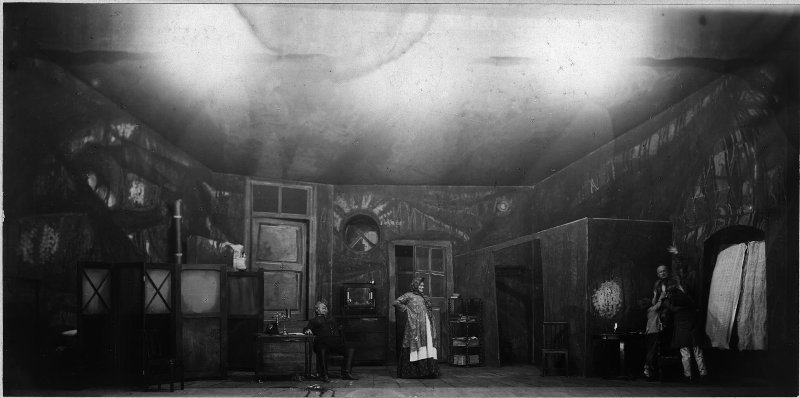
Alexandrinsky Theatre production of Tarelkin's Death. Directed by Vsevolod Meyerkhold, 1917

- Pyotr Konstantinovich Muromsky, a prosperous landowner
- Lidochka, Muromsky's daughter
- Anna Antonovna Atuyeva, Lidochka's aunt
- Vladimir Dmitriyevich Nelkin, a landowner, Muromsky's neighbour
- Ivan Antonovich Rasplyuyev
- Tishka, Muromsky's doorman
- Maxim Kusmich Varravin, Active State Councillor
- Candide Kastorovich Tarelkin, Collegiate Councillor
- Chibisov, Ibisov and Omega, clerks
- Ivan Sidorovich Razuvayev
- Ivan Andreyevich Zhivets
- Kasyan Kasyanovich Shilo, clerk

== Bibliography ==
- Lotman L. M. "Sukhovo-Kobylin". In Istoriia russkoi literatury v 10 tomakh, 8:487–509. Moscow, Leningrad: Izdatel'stvo AN SSSR, 1956.
- Sokolinskii, E. K., ed. A. V. Sukhovo-Kobylin: bibliograficheskii ukazatel' literatury o zhizni i tvorchestve pisatelia, postanovkakh trilogii. St. Petersburg: Giperion, 2001. ISBN 5-89332-046-8.
- Starosel'skaia N. D. Sukhovo-Kobylin. Moscow: Molodaia gvardiia, 2003. ISBN 5-235-02566-0.
- Tunimanov V. "Krechinskii i Raspliuev". In Sukhovo-Kobylin A. V.: Svad'ba Krechinskogo, 86–95. Leningrad: Detskaia literatura, 1983.
