= Op. 62 =

In music, Op. 62 stands for Opus number 62. Compositions that are assigned this number include:

- Arnold – Toy Symphony
- Beethoven – Coriolan Overture
- Chopin – Nocturnes, Op. 62
- Dvořák – My Home
- Elgar – Romance for bassoon
- Mendelssohn – Songs without Words, Book V
- Ippolitov-Ivanov – Turkish Fragments
- Schumann – 3 Gesänge (partsongs with piano ad lib)
- Scriabin – Piano Sonata No. 6
- Tchaikovsky – Pezzo capriccioso
