= Romashkov =

Romashkov (Russian: Ромашков) is a Russian masculine surname originating from the given name Roman (and not from the word romashka); its feminine counterpart is Romashkova. It may refer to

- Nina Ponomaryova (née Romashkova; 1929–2016), Russian discus thrower
- Vladimir Romashkov, Russian film director
