= Op. 55 =

In music, Op. 55 stands for Opus number 55. Compositions that are assigned this number include:

- Beethoven – Symphony No. 3
- Brahms – Triumphlied
- Chopin – Nocturnes, Op. 55
- Alkan - Une fusee, Op. 55
- Elgar – Symphony No. 1
- Glazunov – Symphony No. 5
- Haydn, J. - “Tost” Quartets, Set II, Op. 55
- Ippolitov-Ivanov – Turkish March
- Klebe – Das Märchen von der schönen Lilie
- Krenek – Schwergewicht
- Madetoja – Symphony No. 3 in A major (1926)
- Mendelssohn – Antigone
- Nielsen – Tre Motetter
- Prokofiev – Piano Concerto No. 5
- Ries – Piano Concerto No. 3
- Schumann – 5 Lieder
- Sibelius – Nightride and Sunrise (Öinen ratsastus ja auringonnousu), tone poem for orchestra (1908)
- Szymanowski – Harnasie
- Tchaikovsky – Orchestral Suite No. 3
