= The Zealous Batman =

1908 Russian short silent comedy film

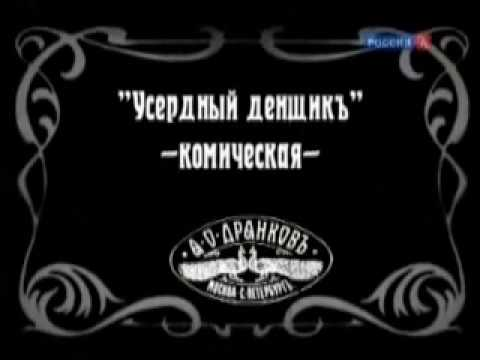
- Russian: Усердный денщик
- Directed by: Nikolay Filippov
- Written by: Nikolay Filippov
- Produced by: Alexander Drankov
- Starring: Vasily Garlin; Nikolay Filippov
- Cinematography: Alexander Drankov
- Distributed by: A. Drankov & Co.
- Release date: December 1, 1908
- Running time: 3 min.
- Country: Russian Empire
- Language: Russian (intertitles)

The Zealous Batman (Russian: Усердный денщикъ, romanized: Userdny denshchik) is a 1908 Russian short feature silent black-and-white slapstick comedy film. It was the first Russian comedy film. It was partially preserved, without intertitles.

The film also pioneered the new form of advertisement: the cinematographer printed cards with film stills.

== Plot ==
An old general, who tries to court his kitchen maid, brings shets of flypaper into to the kitchen as a pretext to chat with her. She then places the sheets throughout the room. After the general departs, his batman - a man of equally amorous but also gluttonous inclinations - becomes entangled in the sticky paper, setting off a chain of mishaps involving hot food, tableware, sewing needle, and other household objects.

== Crew ==
The film was staged and played by actors of St. Petersburg theatres.

- Vasily Garlin (Василий Гарлин) as the general
- Nikolay Filippov (film firector himself) as the batman

A 1908 review/synopsys (public domain)

This play was staged and performed by actors from St. Petersburg theaters. The beautifully performed short play is built on many comic effects and makes the audience laugh merrily. Its content is as follows.

An old general, courting his cook, brought sheets of flypaper into the kitchen to have an extra excuse to chat with her. Fulfilling her master's orders, the maid spread them everywhere, where they were needed and where they were not. The general's orderly, who had come later, in the heat of a declaration of love, sat down on the chair where the sheet of flypaper was lying. But horror! Trying to remove the ill-fated paper, he glued first one hand, then the other, until he finally figured out how to remove the white gloves along with the paper. Having finished this difficult operation and seeing that the cook had left the kitchen, the gourmet orderly hastily grabbed the hot plate and dropped it from his hands, and then, taking a saucepan with hot pies and quickly swallowing them one after another, began to clean the large vessel. The appearance of the cook made him leave the pies and explain that the plate had broken itself. Misfortunes pursued him further, and in a hurry he sat down on the sewing thrown on the chair, in which the needle was sticking out. Jumping up from the prick, he pulled out the needle and gallantly offered it to his beloved. Having earned forgiveness for his kindness, he tries to help her, wiping and stacking the dishes, and, wanting to clear the whole mass of plates from the table, looking at the cook, he stumbled, and, already lying on the floor, he tenaciously holds the plates in his hands. Misfortunes do not end there, and, trying to get up, he lets go of all the plates and breaks them into small pieces. The angered cook pushes her wooer away and drives him out with a floor mop. The poor orderly bought dishes with his last money and wanted to make amends, but then the unfortunate fate haunts him again. He had hardly appeared in the kitchen with a whole pile of new plates, when, seeing his general flirting with the cook, he flared up with jealousy, in his confusion he knocked over the cupboard, knocked it over - and the new plates and the cupboard fell on the old general. And the gourmet orderly, thinking to take advantage of this confusion and try some cream, was caught by the ear at the scene of the crime and led to the footlights with a smeared face.
