= Krechinsky's Wedding =

1854 three-act comedy written by Aleksandr Sukhovo-Kobylin

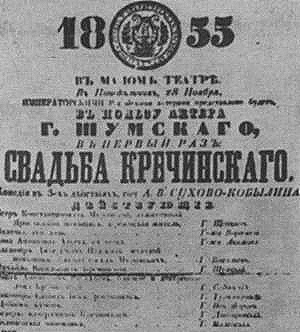
Poster of the first submission of Krechinsky Weddings

Krechinsky's Wedding (Russian: Свадьба Кречинского) is a three-act comedy written by Aleksandr Sukhovo-Kobylin in 1854, based on a rumor in Moscow society about a card sharp who received a large sum of money from a usurer by pawning a false diamond. The author wrote parts of the play in prison while under suspicion for the murder of his mistress. The comedy the first play in a dramatic trilogy Pictures of the Past (Картины прошедшего), which also includes The Trial (Дело) and Tarelkin's Death (Смерть Тарелкина). The play was first published in 1856 in volume 57, issue 5 of the journal The Contemporary.

== Film versions ==
- The Marriage of Krechinsky (1908) directed by Alexander Drankov
- Krechinsky's Wedding (1953 film), directed by Aleksey Zolotnitsky
- Krechinsky's Wedding (1974 film), directed by Vladimir Vorobyov
- Krechinsky's Wedding (1975 film), directed by Mariya Muat and Leonid Kheyfets
- Joker (2002 film), directed by Mikhail Kozakov
- Krechinsky's Wedding (2011 film), directed by P. Khomsky

== Bibliography ==
- Lotman L. M. "Sukhovo-Kobylin". In Istoriia russkoi literatury v 10 tomakh, 8:487–509. Moscow, Leningrad: Izdatel'stvo AN SSSR, 1956.
- Gol'diner V. "Sukhovo-Kobylin". In Literaturnaia entsiklopediia v 11 tomakh, 11:122–128. Moscow: Khudozhestvennaia literatura, 1939.
- Sokolinskii, E. K., ed. A. V. Sukhovo-Kobylin: bibliograficheskii ukazatel' literatury o zhizni i tvorchestve pisatelia, postanovkakh trilogii. St. Petersburg: Giperion, 2001. ISBN 5-89332-046-8.
- Starosel'skaia N. D. Sukhovo-Kobylin. Moscow: Molodaia gvardiia, 2003. ISBN 5-235-02566-0.
- Tunimanov V. "Krechinskii i Raspliuev". In Sukhovo-Kobylin A. V.: Svad'ba Krechinskogo, 86–95. Leningrad: Detskaia literatura, 1983.
