= Stenka Razin (film) =

1908 film by Vladimir Romashkov

Stenka Razin (Стенька Разин)
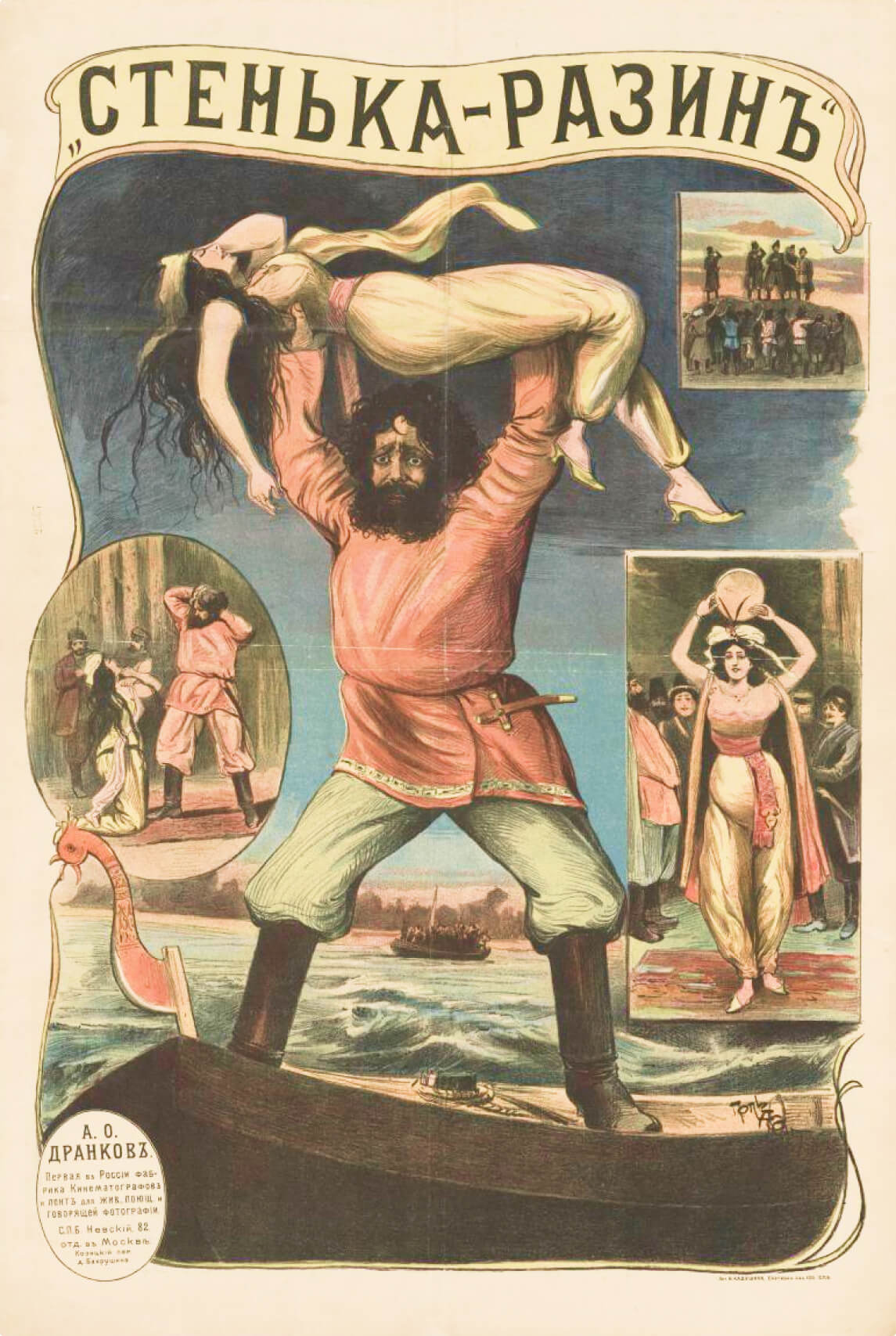
- Russian film poster
- Directed by: Vladimir Romashkov
- Written by: Vasily Goncharov
- Produced by: Alexander Drankov
- Starring: Yevgeny Petrov-Krayevsky
- Cinematography: Alexander Drankov; Nikolai Kozlovsky
- Music by: Mikhail Ippolitov-Ivanov
- Production company: A. Drankov's Atelier
- Release date: 15 October 1908
- Country: Russian Empire
- Language: Silent film

Stenka Razin (Russian: Стенька-Разинъ), also called Free Men of the Volga, is a 1908 silent film. It is generally considered the first Russian feature film.

== Plot ==
The film dramatizes a popular story about the historical Cossack leader Stenka Razin. In the film's narrative, Razin falls in love with a captured Persian princess. His followers object to his love and try to denigrate her, first by interrupting her seductive dance with a Russian dance of their own, then by framing her for infidelity. They successfully turn Razin against the princess, and he throws her into the Volga.

== Production ==
Stenka Razin was produced by Alexander Drankov. Previously a photo journalist and official photographer for the Duma and Nicholas II, Drankov opened the first Russian film studio in 1907 and began producing documentaries in February 1908.

Drankov advertised Stenka Razin as Russia's first feature, although it was not his first attempt. He had previously attempted to film an adaption of Boris Godunov, but due to production difficulties and tensions with the actors, it was never completed. While filming Boris Godunov, Drankov frequently had to move and rebuild sets as the light changed, which led him to avoid constructing sets for Stenka Razin. The scenes set on the Volga were filmed on Lake Razliv near Saint Petersburg.

The film was originally conceived by Vasily Goncharov as part of an experimental play: the beginning and end of the play would be pre-recorded and projected on screen, while the middle would be performed live. Goncharov hired Alexander Drankov to film the opening and closing footage, but Drankov convinced Goncharov to let him film the middle scenes as well. Without seeking Goncharov's permission or crediting him, Drankov released his combined footage as a stand-alone film one day before the play's premiere. Goncharov complained to the Union of Dramatic and Musical Writers, demanding they protect his authorship rights. However, the union refused to intervene, as they did not consider Goncharov's experiment to be literary.

Stenka Razin starred Yevgeny Petrov-Krayevsky, an actor from the Petrograd People's House theater, who would later direct films for Drankov's studio. It is not known who played the princess. Little is known about the director, Vladimir Romashkov, who did not direct another picture. Mikhail Ippolitov-Ivanov wrote a score for the film, which built on the popular folk song Down Along Mother Volga. Drankov encouraged audiences to sing the folk song, popularly known as the "drunkard's ballad", during the film.

== Style and themes ==
Stenka Razin

The film tells its story through a series of distinct "tableau" scenes, possibly modeled after lubok prints. The shots are almost entirely static, with "barely perceptible" camera movement.

The historical figure Stenka Razin was a symbol of resistance against oppression, and his story appealed to an audience who had experienced the Russian Revolution of 1905. The film is loosely based on the folk song From the Island to the Deep Stream, which would have been well known to the film's audience, reducing the need for exposition. Denise Youngblood and Rimgaila Salys consider the film a politically conservative version of the song's story, both noting that Razin is portrayed as a violent drunk rather than a hero of the common people.

Rachel Morley notes that earlier versions of the Razin story did not depict the princess as a dancer. She suggests that the newly-added dance motif links the princess to Salome, whose story had recently been popularized in a play by Oscar Wilde (translated into Russian in 1904) and a 1905 opera by Richard Strauss. Morley sees the film as reflecting a tension between personal pleasure (represented by the princess) and duty to the Motherland (represented by the Volga, the primacy of which is established in the opening scene), as well as anxieties about social changes in Russia, over which traditional patriarchy ultimately triumphs.

== Release and reception ==
The film was an immediate success and helped establish the Russian film industry. Contemporary reviews were highly positive, but modern reception is mostly negative, with retrospective reviews criticizing the film's minimal camerawork as well as its crude acting and blocking.
