= Caucasian Sketches, Suite No. 1 =

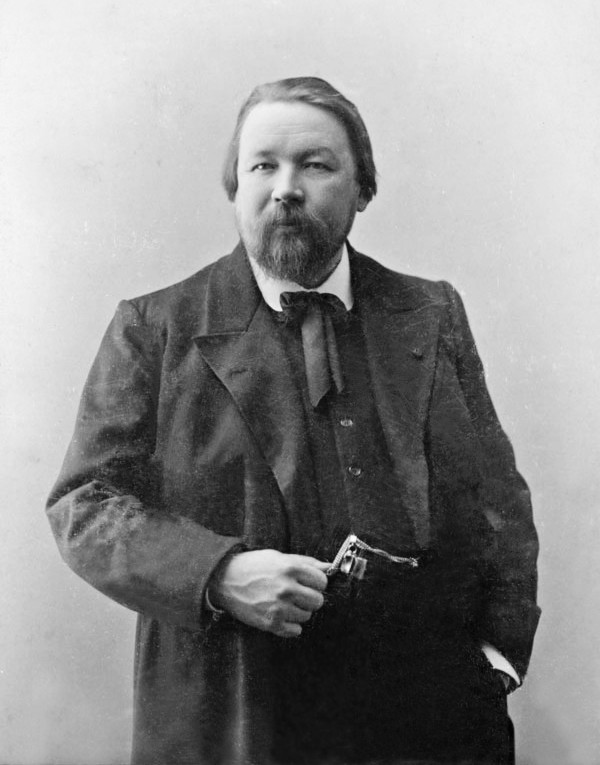
Mikhail Ippolitov-Ivanov

Caucasian Sketches, Suite No. 1, Op. 10 (Russian: Кавказские эскизы, Сюита №1) is an orchestral suite composed in 1894 and one of the most representative works by Russian composer Mikhail Ippolitov-Ivanov. Its final movement, titled Procession of the Sardar (French: Cortège du Sardar; also popularly known as March of the Sardar or Sardar's March), is often performed as a standalone composition and is a favorite in pop concerts.

== Composition ==
Mikhail Ippolitov-Ivanov, student of Nikolai Rimsky-Korsakov, graduated from the St. Petersburg conservatory in 1885. He secured for himself the directorship of the orchestra of Tbilisi, the capital of Georgia, and spent up to seven years learning about Georgian folk music. Some of the style and melodies of that region are included in his Caucasian Sketches. It is dedicated to I. Pitoéff, at that time President of the Russian Musical Society on Tiflis.

== Structure ==
This orchestral suite consists of four movements, namely:

1. In a Mountain Pass. Allegro moderato – Moderato assai – Tempo I
2. In a Village. Larghetto – Allegretto grazioso – Tempo I
3. In a Mosque. Adagietto
4. Procession of the Sardar. Allegro moderato. Tempo marziale

The suite begins with a vibrant piece, In a Mountain Pass, which is characterized by a steady ambitious beat suggesting the steep Caucasus Mountains. The second movement, In a Village, begins with a slow tempo and, after a cadenza, gains a steady beat and becomes more vibrant near the end, when after a second cadenza, slows its tempo down again. The title of a third, In a Mosque, reflects the abundance of mosques in the once Turkish Caucasus and Circassia, and the listener can hear the Muezzin's call to prayer in the music. The most famous and admired portion is the final piece, Procession of the Sardar, a Persian title for a military commander, leader or dignitary.

== Notable recordings ==
Notable recordings of this suite include:

Orchestra	Conductor	Record Company	Year of Recording	Format
Music for Westchester Symphony	Siegfried Landau	Turnabout	1969	LP
New York Philharmonic Orchestra	Leonard Bernstein	Sony Music Entertainment	1976	CD
Sydney Symphony Orchestra	Christopher Lyndon-Gee	Marco Polo	1990	CD
National Symphony Orchestra of Ukraine	Arthur Fagen	Naxos Records	1995	CD

== See also ==
- Caucasian Sketches
- Caucasian Sketches, Suite No. 2
