= Alexander Drankov =

Russian photographer (1879–1949)

Alexander Osipovich Drankov
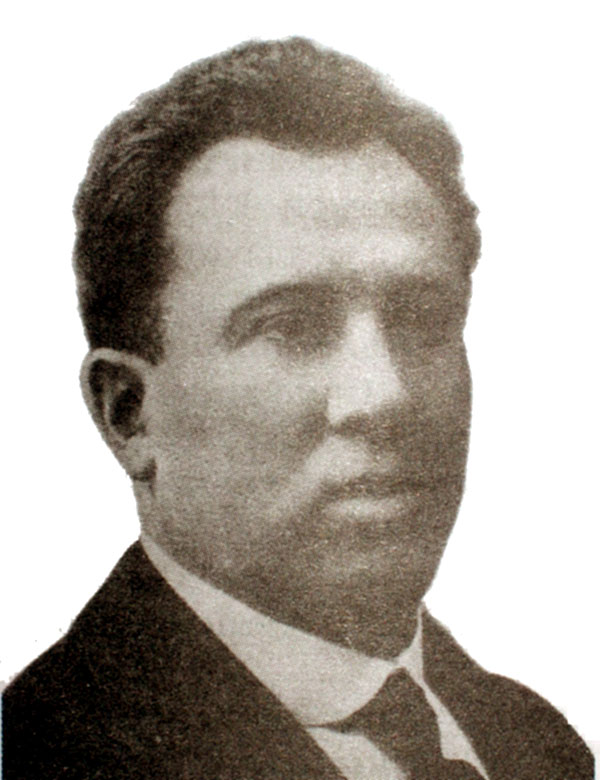
- Born: Abram-Nison Drankov; 29 July 1879; Yelisavetgrad
- Died: 3 January 1949 (aged 68)
- Occupations: Film producer, photographer, cameraman
- Website: Alexander Osipovich Drankov on IMDb

Alexander Osipovich Drankov (Russian: Алекса́ндр О́сипович Дранко́в; 1879–1949) was a Russian and Soviet photographer, cameraman, film director, and film producer. He is considered a pioneer of Russian pre-revolutionary cinematography.

== Biography ==
Drankov was born Abram Iosifovich Drankov (Абрам Иосифович Дранков). Despite having no formal education, Alexander Drankov and his brother Lev founded a photography studio in Saint Petersburg. Alexander worked as a foreign photography correspondent for the Illustrated London News and L'Illustration and was an official photographer for the Duma and Nicholas II. Drankov also filmed title cards for French movies in Russian. His studio was on the cutting edge of technology, owning a Pathé camera and electric lighting.

=== 1907-1908 ===
In autumn 1907, Drankov advertised that he would open a movie studio called a "cinematographic atelier." His announcement encouraged Pathé to create their first Russian documentary, Донские казаки в Москве (Don Cossacks in Moscow), which was extremely successful.

Drankov read rumors that a foreign company planned to film a theatrical production of Boris Godunov in Moscow. Although no such plans existed, he decided to preempt the rumored film by creating his own and found another theater which was performing the same play. The production was troubled; the theater was open-air, forcing Drankov to move and reassemble the set as the light changed, and he clashed with the actors over his proposed cuts to the script, which would omit roughly 80% of the play. Eventually, the lead actor refused to participate, leaving the film without its title character. Drankov would eventually screen his recorded footage under the names Scenes From Boyar Life and The False Dmitri.

Drankov's studio released 17 short documentaries in 1908, one of which captured footage of an active fire. Drankov screened his films to Pyotr Stolypin, Maria Feodorovna, and a film exposition in Hamburg, making them the first Russian film exports. In August 1908, he filmed Leo Tolstoy's 80th birthday.

On 15 October 1908, Drankov released Stenka Razin. Its production had begun over the summer when Vasily Goncharov hired Drankov to capture footage for an experimental play about the Cossack leader. The play would start and end with pre-recorded projected film, while the middle would be performed live. Drankov convinced Goncharov to let him film additional scenes, covering material intended for the live performance. Without Goncharov's permission and crediting him, Drankov released his footage as a stand-alone film a day before the play's premiere. Drankov promoted his version of Stenka Razin as Russia's first feature film, ignoring his incomplete Boris Godunov. The film was an immediate success and helped establish the Russian film industry. Drankov followed this success with two comedies, including The Zealous Batman, the first Russian comedy film - which failed commercially, and another filmed play: The Marriage of Krechinsky.

=== 1909-1916 ===
In 1909, Drankov made a documentary about the assassination and funeral of Mikhail Herzenstein, which was censored in most of Russia.

In 1909 and 1910, Drankov filmed additional footage of Leo Tolstoy. Tolstoy encouraged Drankov to record the lives of peasants and helped organize a wedding for that purpose. Two months after Tolstoy's death, Drankov released the footage as A Peasant Wedding and claimed that Tolstoy personally wrote and directed it.

Drankov developed a rivalry with fellow Russian director Alexander Khanzhonkov and would infamously create "disruptions" of Khanzhonkov's upcoming films: competing films with the same title, on the same subject, or based on the same source material, to be released first. In general, Khanzhonkov responded by marketing his versions as higher quality. However, on at least one occasion, Khanzhonkov beat Drankov to release. On another occasion, after Drankov launched a public screenplay writing contest with a 1,000 ruble award, Khanzhonkov launched his own for 1,500 rubles.

In 1913, Khanzhonkov announced a four-reel film about the Romanovs, celebrating 300 years of the dynasty's rule. In response, Drankov made a competing seven-reel film, receiving Nicholas II's approval and access to authentic historical costumes from a museum. Drankov hired Yevgeni Bauer as a set decorator, which marked Bauer's entry into the film industry. The two films were released simultaneously, but Khanzhonkov's was better received.

Between 1914 and 1915, Drankov created a serial about Sofia Blyuvshtein. The series became an unprecedented success, simultaneously playing in 11 theaters in Moscow alone. Drankov followed this success with The Robber Vaska Churkin and other lurid serials, such as The Bloody Fortnight and The Seventh Commandment. In May 1915, he capitalized on anti-German riots with Mary Vetsera, The Secret of the Habsburg Court. In 1916, when his film Washed in Blood was banned for glorifying revolutionaries, he re-released it under the title A Drama from the Life of Grigori Rasputin.

=== 1917-1949 ===
In 1917, the Russian Provisional Government recruited filmmakers, including Drankov, to make anti-Bolshevik films. That same year, Drankov also created a film glorifying Catherine Breshkovsky. Later that year, as film supplies ran low, Drankov took a break from filmmaking and managed Yekaterina Geltzer on tour.

In 1918, Drankov left Moscow for Kiev alongside Vlas Doroshevich under the pretense of adapting one of his novels into a film. He then fled to Odessa and Crimea, where he briefly resumed making films with fellow refugees. In 1920, he left for Constantinople, where he started a gambling business on cockroach racing until the police shut it down. In 1923, when Mustafa Kemal expelled Russian refugees from Turkey, Drankov left for the United States, living first in New York and then in Los Angeles. In 1927, Drankov attempted to start his own Hollywood studio to produce films on Russian themes but was unsuccessful.

Drankov died of a heart attack on 3 January 1949. He is buried in the Jewish Eternal Home cemetery in Colma, California.

== Reception and legacy ==
Despite his prolific output and popular success, Drankov's films were considered inartistic. They did not play at prestigious movie theaters, and Drankov was unable to recruit serious theater directors to his studio. His films were criticized for their sensationalism and for making light of crime.

While playing an important role in Russian cinema, Drankov developed a reputation for being ruthless and aggressive, and has been characterized as a "gangster."
