= Turkish March (Ippolitov-Ivanov) =

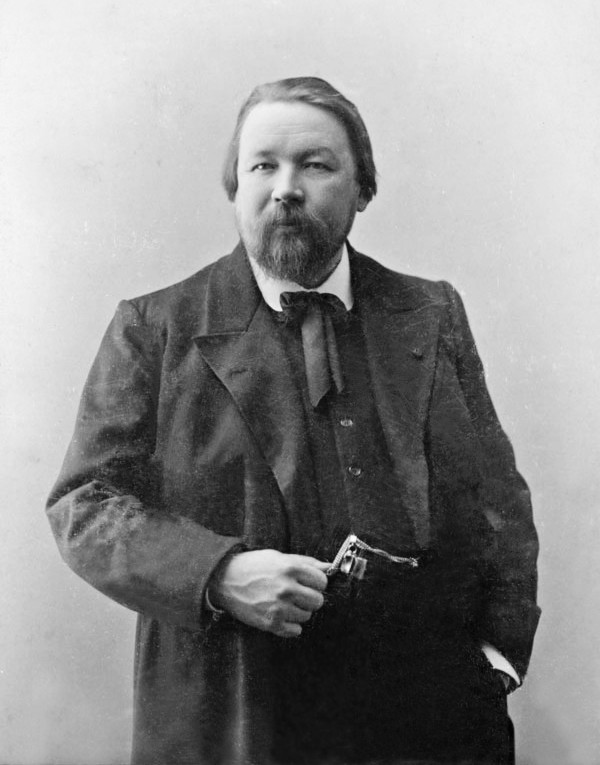
Mikhail Ippolitov-Ivanov

The Turkish March (or Turkic March), Op. 55 is a composition by Russian composer Mikhail Ippolitov-Ivanov, which was published in 1932 in Moscow.

== Composition ==
This symphonic march lasts approximately five minutes. It is a very conventional work by Ippolitov-Ivanov, and therefore, all harmonies and rhythms are conventional. He wrote this composition as a part of his own research for Turkish, Uzbek and Kazakh folk music in its later years, and two years after composing his Turkish Fragments, which, indeed, recreate the same atmosphere with Turkish melodies and rhythms. He died three years afterwards, and this march is one of his last works.

== Notable recordings ==
Notable recordings of this march include:

Orchestra	Conductor	Record Company	Year of Recording	Format
Singapore Symphony Orchestra	Choo Hoey	Marco Polo	1989	CD
National Symphony Orchestra of Ukraine	Arthur Fagen	Naxos Records	1995	CD
