= Five Fragments =

1935 orchestral suite by Dmitri Shostakovich

- by Dmitri Shostakovich
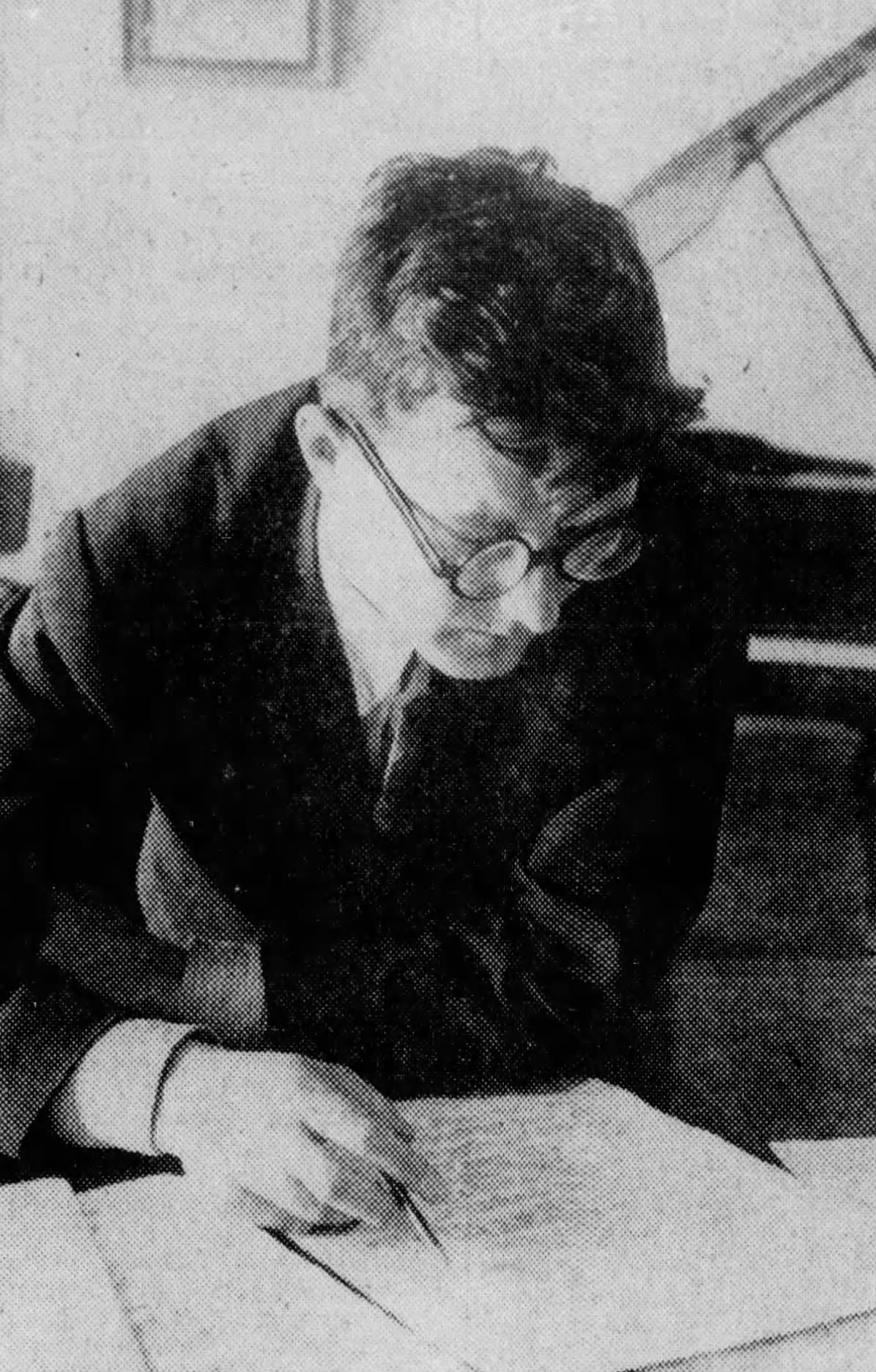
- Shostakovich circa 1942
- Opus: 42
- Genre: Suite
- Composed: June 9, 1935
- Published: 1984
- Publisher: Muzika; Hans Sikorski Musikverlage; DSCH Publishers
- Duration: 9 minutes
- Movements: 5
- Scoring: Orchestra

Premiere
- Date: April 26, 1965
- Location: Leningrad Philharmonic Hall; Leningrad, Russian SFSR
- Conductor: Igor Blazhkov
- Performers: Leningrad Philharmonic Orchestra

The Five Fragments, Op. 42 is a suite for small orchestra composed on June 9, 1935, by Dmitri Shostakovich. It was the only work, apart from film music, that he composed that year. He approached it as preparatory work for the composition of the final version of his Symphony No. 4.

It was unperformed for 29 years after its completion, with Shostakovich indicating in 1941 that he felt it was not of sufficient quality to perform or publish. In the 1960s, he sent a photocopy of the score with his corrections and amended orchestration to Igor Blazhkov, who conducted the world premiere on April 26, 1965, with the Leningrad Philharmonic Orchestra.

Despite his initial reluctance to publicize the Five Fragments, Shostakovich expressed satisfaction with the music after its premiere. Edison Denisov praised the work's "chamber-like" scoring and said it deserved to be closely studied by composers.

== Background ==
Shostakovich began to plan the work that ultimately became his Symphony No. 4 in 1931. By 1935, he had discarded the torso of a rough draft for a first movement and began to sketch out the new version of the work. In an article published on April 11, he said that he wanted to compose chamber and instrumental music before he embarked on the "big job" of writing the final draft of the symphony. Among the works he contemplated writing were a string quartet and violin sonata, but the only score he produced that year aside from film music was the Five Fragments.

In a 1973 interview, Shostakovich confirmed that the music was intended as sketches for a larger work that he never embarked upon. According to Laurel Fay and Marina Frolova-Walker, the Five Fragments prefigured aspects of the Symphony No. 4, with the former calling them "preparatory work" for the larger piece. He also described the work as his attempt to create an "instrumental equivalent" to the song cycles of Gustav Mahler.

The Five Fragments was initially designated "Op. 43", but was later assigned Op. 42. Despite being part of the Shostakovich work list, it was unperformed for 29 years. The composer indicated to Grigori Schneerson in a letter dated January 28, 1941, that he did not believe the work was of sufficient quality to be performed or published.

It was not until the 1960s that Shostakovich expressed interest in publicizing the Five Fragments. He sent photocopies of some of his works from the 1930s to conductor Igor Blazhkov, who was interested in his early music, and amended the orchestration in three places; the most notable being the doubling of the last chord's top note with a xylophone, the only time the instrument is used in the entire work.

== Music ==
The score consists of five movements:

1. Moderato
2. Andante
3. Largo
4. Moderato
5. Allegretto

Levon Akopyan noted that the music refrains from loudness and fast tempi. A typical performance lasts approximately 9 minutes.

=== Instrumentation ===
The instrumentation for the Five Fragments is as follows:

Woodwinds
Piccolo
Flute
Oboe
English horn
E♭ clarinet
Clarinet
Bass clarinet
Bassoon
Contrabassoon

Brass
2 Horns
Trumpet
Trombone
Tuba

Percussion
Xylophone
Snare drum

Strings
Harp
1st Violins
2nd Violins
Violas
Cellos
Double Basses

=== Manuscripts ===
The holograph sketches and score, as well as a photocopy of the latter authorized by Shostakovich in the 1960s are held in his family archives in Moscow. The sketch, which is damaged by two horizontal folds and includes sketches for the Symphony No. 4, is complete on a single sheet of 30-staff score paper, while the score is on 4 pages of 36-staff paper.

== Premiere ==
The world premiere of the Five Fragments took place on April 26, 1965, at the Leningrad Philharmonic Hall, played by the Leningrad Philharmonic Orchestra conducted by Blazhkov. The first performance outside the Soviet Union took place in London at St John's, Smith Square on May 24, 1977, played by the Kensington Symphony Orchestra conducted by Leslie Head.Blazhkov conducted the Kiev Chamber Orchestra in the first recording of the Five Fragments, which was issued by Melodiya in 1975. The score was first published by Muzika in 1984.

== Reception ==
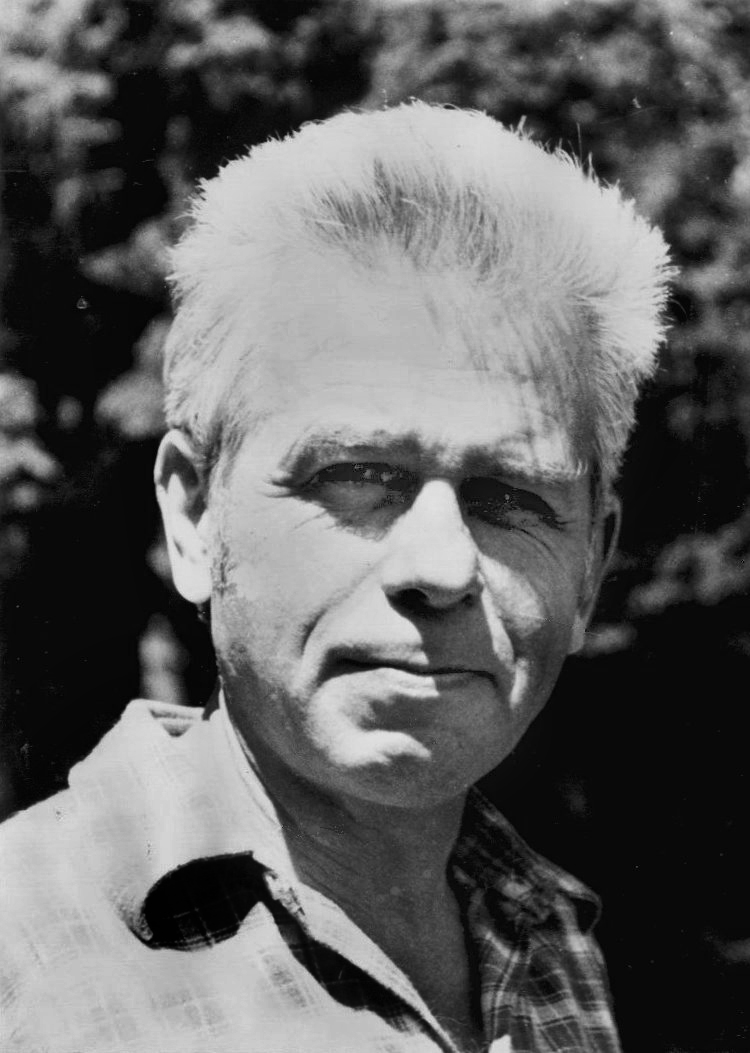
Edison Denisov was an admirer of the Five Fragments

Illness prevented Shostakovich from being able to attend the world premiere of the Five Fragments. In a letter to Blazhkov dated April 27, 1965, he informed the conductor that he was still sick and unable to travel to Leningrad, but that his daughter Galina would be visiting the city soon and to give her a copy of the in-house recording of the world premiere. He told his student Vladislav Uspensky on May 11 that he was "of course very glad" to have the work performed. On September 21, Shostakovich wrote to Blazhkov:

Thank you ... for everything you are doing for me. I have listened to the recording of my [Five Fragments]. They were performed magnificently and in general I like these little pieces.

Edison Denisov was an admirer of the work and said that it deserved to be closely studied by composers. He praised how Shostakovich used the orchestra "as the sum of different ensembles, individually chosen for each of the five pieces" to create a "chamber-like" sound.

In a review for MusicWeb International of Mark Elder's recording of the Five Fragments with the City of Birmingham Symphony Orchestra, Colin Clarke called the work "disturbing" and that it seemed to suggest that "Shostakovich is saying that this is what he really writes when he gets the chance".
