= Caucasian Sketches, Suite No. 2 =

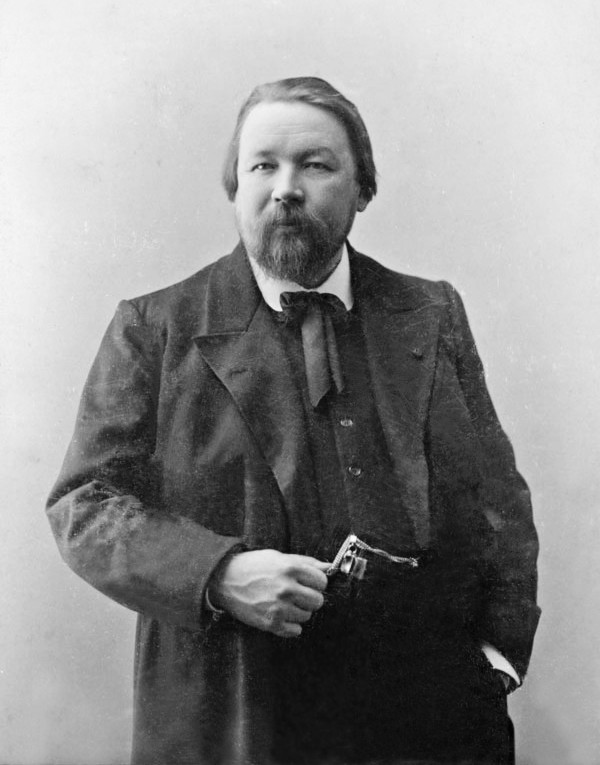
Mikhail Ippolitov-Ivanov

Caucasian Sketches, Suite No. 2, Op. 42 (Russian: Кавказские эскизы, Сюита №2, «Иверия») is an orchestral suite by Russian composer Mikhail Ippolitov-Ivanov written in 1896, after he moved to Moscow. The work is more commonly known by the subtitle Iveria, which is an archaic name for the country of Georgia, the folk music of which inspired the composition.

== Composition ==
After being a student of Nikolai Rimsky-Korsakov, Ippolitov-Ivanov moved to Tbilisi, where he tried to become the director of its conservatory and its orchestra. In these years, he composed both Suite No. 1, in 1894, and Suite No. 2, in 1896.

This suite, as Suite No. 1 did, also presents re-used material from Georgian folk songs. Notably, the Berceuse (meaning lullaby in French) is based on the traditional Georgian lullaby Iavnana.

== Structure ==
The suite contains an introduction and four sketches. A typical performance of this work would last 20–25 minutes:

1. Introduction: Lamentation of Princess Ketevana. Largo - L'istesso tempo - Largo
2. Berceuse. Allegretto
3. Lezghinka. Larghetto - Allegretto - Allegro - Allegro vivo - Presto
4. Georgian March. Allegro marziale

The Lezghinka had also been used in Glinka's Ruslan and Lyudmila; it is a typical dance from Lezghy tribes with oriental themes. The piece culminates in a war-march-style finale.

== Notable recordings ==
Notable recordings of this suite include:

Orchestra	Conductor	Record Company	Year of Recording	Format
Sydney Symphony Orchestra	Christopher Lyndon-Gee	Marco Polo	1990	CD
National Symphony Orchestra of Ukraine	Arthur Fagen	Naxos Records	1995	CD

== See also ==
- Caucasian Sketches
- Caucasian Sketches, Suite No. 1
