= Vladimir Romashkov =

Russian actor and director

Vladimir Fyodorovich Romashkov (Russian: Владимир Фёдорович Ромашков; 2 July 1862 – 5 October 1939) was a Russian actor and director in the theatre and films. He directed the first Russian narrative film, Stenka Razin, released on October 15 (October 28), 1908.
