= Caucasian Sketches =

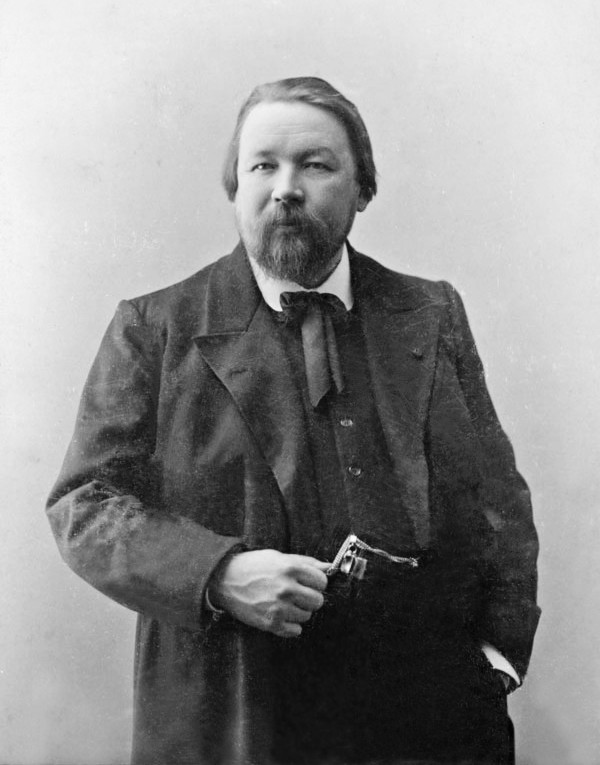
Mikhail Ippolitov-Ivanov

Caucasian Sketches (Russian: Кавказские эскизы) is a pair of orchestral suites written in 1894 and 1896 by the Russian composer Mikhail Ippolitov-Ivanov. The Caucasian Sketches is the most often performed of his compositions and can be heard frequently on classical radio stations. The final movement of the Caucasian Sketches, Suite No. 1, entitled Procession of the Sardar (French: Cortège du Sardar; also popularly known as March of the Sardar or Sardar's March), is often heard by itself, and is a favorite of "Pops" concerts.

== Influences of the Caucasian Sketches ==
The orchestral songs of the Caucasian Sketches were influenced by the Georgian and Armenian folk songs that Ippolitov-Ivanov heard during his years as director of the music conservatory and conductor of the orchestra in Tbilisi, the principal city of Georgia, and during his visits to the surrounding Caucasus Mountains.

Ippolitov-Ivanov had studied at the St. Petersburg Conservatory under the composer Nikolai Rimsky-Korsakov, a master of orchestration, whose style of beats and chimes is reflected in the songs of the Caucasian Sketches.

== Caucasian Sketches, Suite No. 1 ==
Caucasian Sketches, Suite No. 1, Op. 10 (1894) consists of four "songs" or parts. The suite begins with a vibrant song, In a Mountain Pass, which is characterized by a steady ambitious beat suggesting the steep Caucasus Mountains and makes one feel like a bird flying over them. The second song, In a Village, has a steady beat and becomes more vibrant near the end. The title of the third, In a Mosque, reflects the abundance of mosques in the once Turkish Caucasus and Circassian regions such as Adygea in Russia, and one can hear the Muezzin's call to prayer in the music. The most famous is the final piece, Procession of the Sardar, a title for a feudal lord, military commander, leader or dignitary historically used in the region.

== Caucasian Sketches, Suite No. 2 ==
Caucasian Sketches, Suite No. 2, Op. 42 Iveria (1896) was written after the composer moved to Moscow. The suite contains an introduction and four sketches. The first sketch is the tantalizing, oppressive Lamentation of Princess Ketevana. It is followed by Berceuse (French for lullaby). Then comes Lesghinka, a manic song that becomes rambunctious near the end. And the final sketch is the Georgian March, a very lively song which sounds like a military march and makes much use of the woodwinds and chimes.

Suite No. 2 is also called Iveria (Iberia), the name given by the Greeks and Romans to the ancient kingdom of Kartli, corresponding roughly to the eastern and southern parts of the country of Georgia today.
