= Vlas Doroshevich =

Russian journalist, novelist, and essayist (1864–1922)

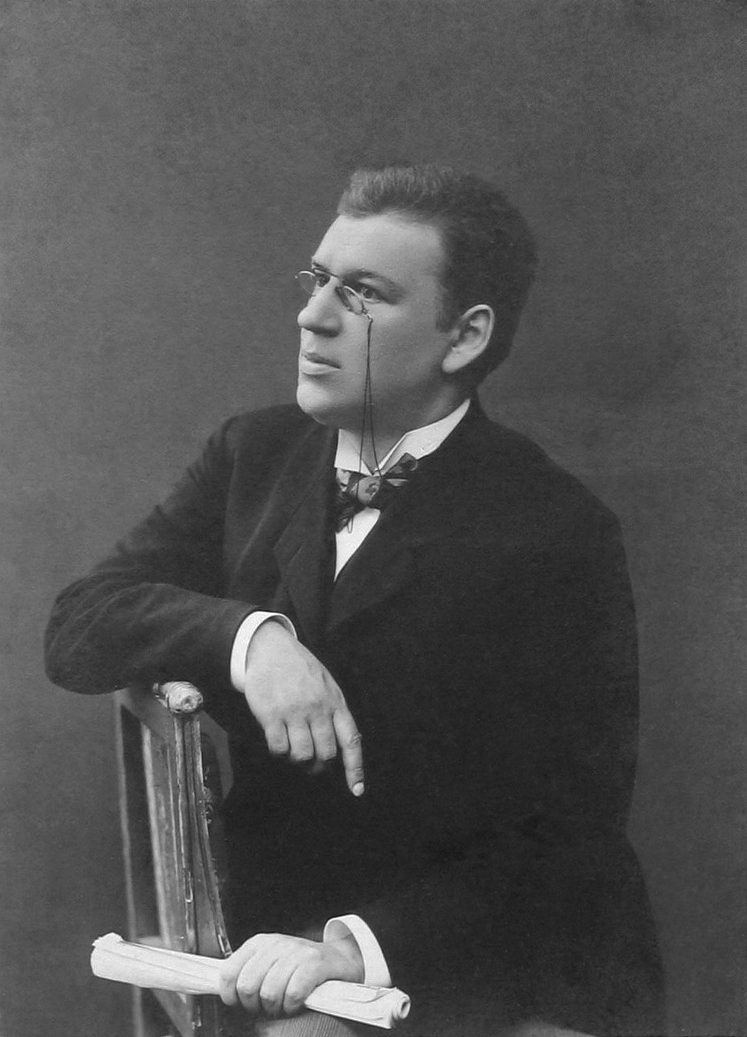
- Born: April 17, 1864; Moscow, Russian Empire
- Died: February 22, 1922 (aged 57); St. Petersburg, Russia

Vlas Mikhailovich Doroshevich (Russian: Влас Миха́йлович Дороше́вич, April 17, 1864 – February 22, 1922), was one of Russia's most popular and widely read journalists, and a novelist, essayist, drama critic, and short story writer.

== Early life ==
Doroshevich was born in Moscow, where his mother Alexandra Sokolova was a member of the wealthy upper class. She was educated at the prestigious Smolny Institute in St. Petersburg, but was disinherited by her family for marrying Vlas's father, who was an unsuccessful writer, and far beneath her in social status. He died shortly before Vlas was born.

When Vlas was six months old, Alexandra, who had two other children and was struggling financially, brought him to Moscow and gave him to a childless couple by the name of Doroshevich. His mother requested that he be named Blaise in honor of the French philosopher Blaise Pascal, but his adopted parents Russianized the name as Vlasii, or Vlas. Ten years later Alexandra reclaimed custody of Vlas through legal procedures that Mikhail Doroshevich, Vlas's adopted father, said had violated his rights.

== Career ==
At the age of sixteen Vlas withdrew from school, and left home because of a desire to be amongst the people. Rather than doing social work as many former students did at the time, Vlas became a laborer and a dock worker. His time as a common worker was brief, though, and he soon found work as a proof-reader and actor. At seventeen he began writing for a paper called The Moscow Flyer.

During the 1880s he became a skillful journalist and critic, writing for popular papers such as Entertainment, the Petersburg Gazette, and the Alarm Clock, which also employed the young writer Anton Chekhov. In 1893 he moved to Odessa to work as a reporter for the Odessa Flyer, a local paper with a large circulation. He later visited France on assignment, where he was impressed by the feuilleton style of journalism, a style he soon began using himself. This style was widely popular, but some literary figures, like Zinaida Gippius and Alexander Blok criticized it for being talentless and vulgar.

In 1897 he traveled to Sakhalin as part of a larger international assignment. He recorded his experiences and impressions in his book Sakhalin, originally serialized in Russian Wealth, God's World, and other papers, and recently published in English translation by the Anthem Press as Russia's Penal Colony in the Far East.

From 1902 to 1918 he was the editor of the paper Russian Word. He also gained fame as a novelist, short story writer, and religious commentator. Some of his published works were: In the Promised Land (Palestine) 1900, Mu-Shan: A Chinese Novel 1901, and Legends and Stories of the East 1902.

== Later life ==
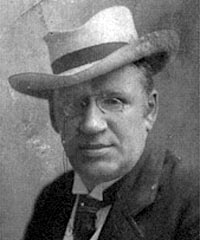
Doroshevich c.1910.

He published what is now his best known work The Way of the Cross, in Russian Word in October 1915. The Way of the Cross is Vlas's account of the refugees from the German invasion of Russia during World War I, in August and September 1915. Vlas journeyed from Moscow to meet the oncoming refugees, travelling through to the rear of the Russian army and recording the hardships and struggling he witnessed along the way. When people died at the roadside, they put up crosses to mark the burial sites, giving the account its title The Way of the Cross.

Even though he was rich, Vlas welcomed the rise of the Bolsheviks and the Russian Revolution. This might've been partly due to his outcast status among intellectuals because of his feuilletons, and their popularity with middle and working-class people. After his death in Petrograd in 1922, he was buried next to the grave of the writer and revolutionary Vera Zasulich.

== English translations ==
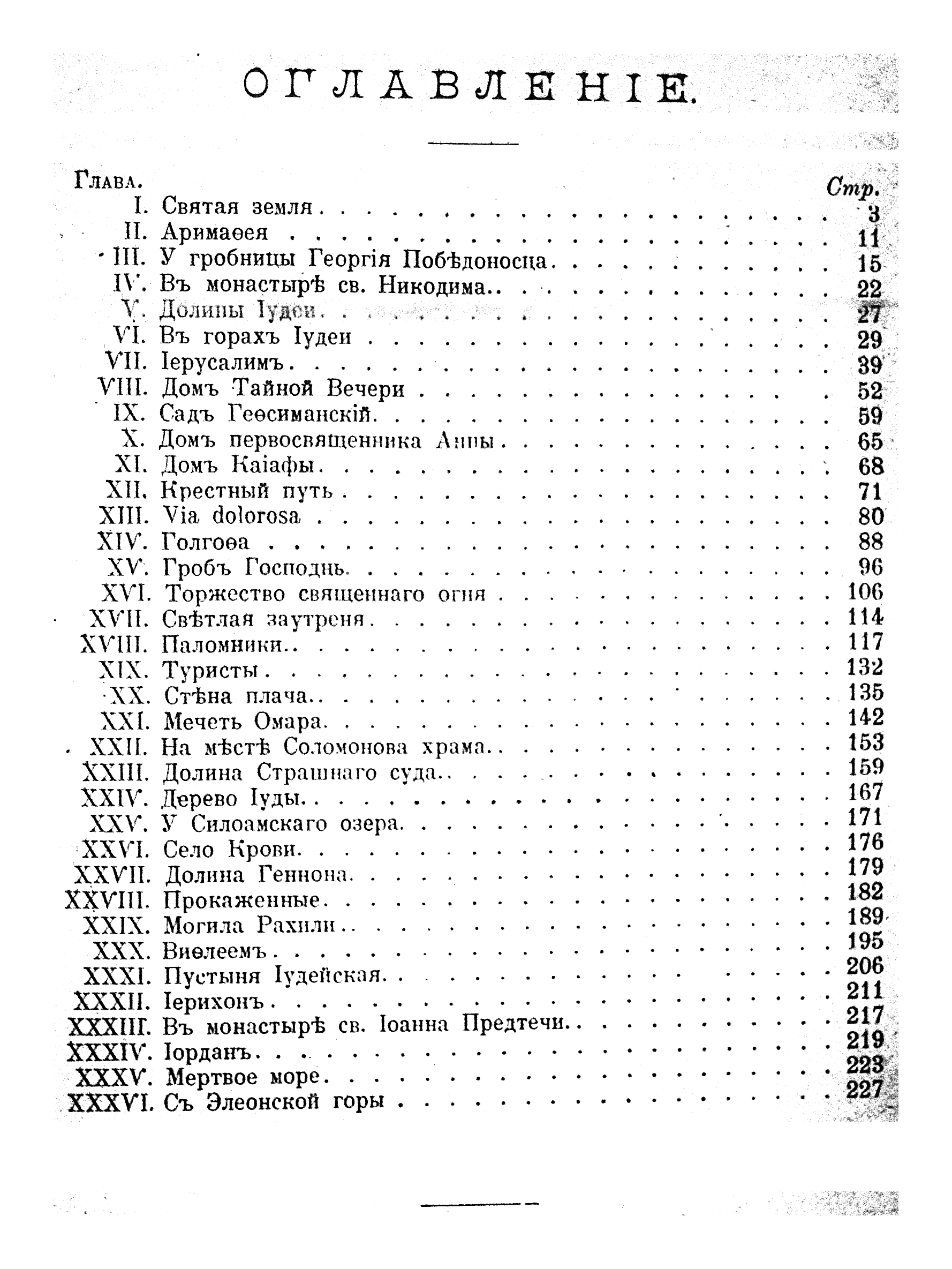
- Page of the book In the Promised land, 1900
  The Way of the Cross, G.P. Putnam's Sons, 1916. from Archive.org
- Russia's Penal Colony in the Far East: A Translation of Doroshevich's Sakhalin, Anthem Press, 2009.
- Three Chinese Tales, Glas Magazine, Read online
- What the Emperor Cannot Do: Tales and Legends of the Orient, GLAS New Russian Writing, 2012. ISBN 5-7172-0094-3
