= Mikhail Ippolitov-Ivanov =

Russian composer (1859–1935)

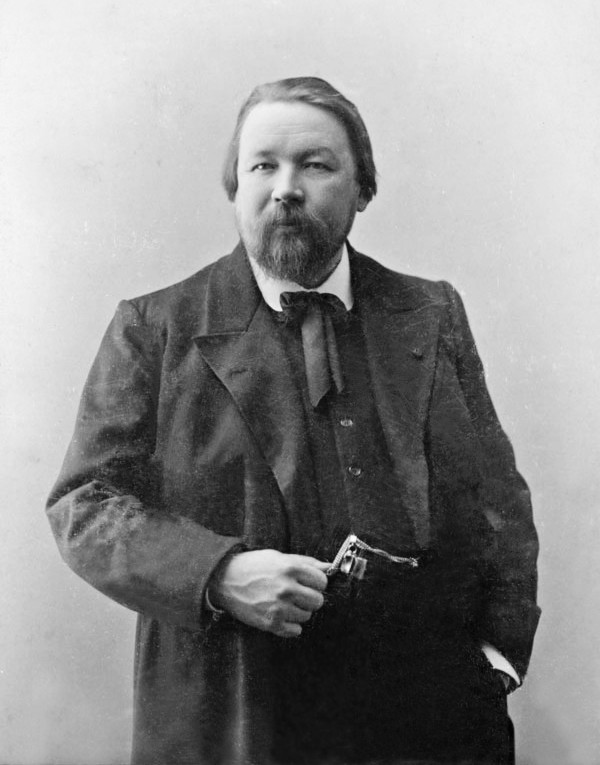
Ippolitov-Ivanov

Mikhail Mikhailovich Ippolitov-Ivanov (Russian: Михаи́л Миха́йлович Ипполи́тов-Ива́нов; born Mikhail Mikhailovich Ivanov; 19 November [O.S. 7 November] 1859 – 28 January 1935) was a Russian and Soviet composer, conductor and teacher. His music ranged from the late-Romantic era into the 20th century era.

== Biography ==
Mikhail Mikhailovich Ivanov was born in 1859 at Gatchina, near St. Petersburg, where his father was a mechanic employed at the palace. He later added the name Ippolitov, his mother's maiden name, to distinguish himself from a composer and music critic with an identical name. He studied music at home and was a choirboy at the cathedral of St. Isaac, where he also had musical instruction, before entering the St. Petersburg Conservatory in 1875. In 1882 he completed his studies as a composition pupil of Rimsky-Korsakov, whose influence was to remain strong.

Ippolitov-Ivanov's first appointment was to the position of director of the music academy and conductor of the orchestra in Tiflis, the principal city of Georgia, where he was to spend the next seven years. This period allowed him to develop an interest in the music of the region, a reflection of the general interest taken in the music of non-Slav minorities and more exotic neighbours that was current at the time, and that was to receive overt official encouragement for other reasons after the Revolution. One of his notable pupils in Tiflis was conductor Edouard Grikurov.

On 1 May 1886, in Tiflis, he conducted the premiere of the third and final version of Tchaikovsky's Romeo and Juliet Overture-Fantasia.

In 1893, Ippolitov-Ivanov became a professor at the Moscow Conservatory, of which he was director from 1905 until 1924. He served as conductor for the branch of the Russian Musical Society that he founded, the Mamontov and Zimin Opera companies, and, after 1925, the Bolshoi Theatre, and was known as a contributor to broadcasting and to musical journalism.

Politically, Ippolitov-Ivanov retained a measure of independence. He was president of the Society of Writers and Composers in 1922, but took no part in the quarrels between musicians concerned either to encourage new developments in music or to foster a form of proletarian art. His own style had been formed in the 1880s under Rimsky-Korsakov, and to this he added a similar interest in folk-music, particularly the music of Georgia, where he returned in 1924 to spend a year reorganizing the Conservatory in Tiflis. He died in Moscow in 1935.

His pupils included Reinhold Glière and Sergei Vasilenko.

== Music ==
Ippolitov-Ivanov's works include operas, orchestral music, chamber music and a large number of songs. His style is similar to that of his teacher Rimsky-Korsakov. With the exception of his orchestral suite Caucasian Sketches (Kavkazskiye Eskizi, 1894), which includes the much-excerpted "Procession of the Sardar", his music is rarely heard today.

As well as his entirely original works, Ippolitov-Ivanov completed Modest Mussorgsky's opera Zhenitba.

He was awarded the Order of the Red Banner of Labour in 1934.

== Works ==
- Caucasian Sketches
  - Suite No. 1, Op. 10 (1894)
  - Suite No. 2, Op. 42 (Iveria) (1896)
- Symphony No. 1 in E minor, Op. 46 (1908)
- Yar-khmel (Spring Overture), Op. 1 (1882)
- Violin Sonata, Op. 8 (published by D. Rahter of Leipzig, 1887, Score from Sibley Music Library Digital Scores Collection)
- Quartet for piano and strings, Op. 9
- String Quartet No. 1 in A minor, Op. 13 (published c. 1890)
- Ballade Romantique for violin and piano, Op. 20 (published by Universal Edition in 1928)
- Symphonic Scherzo, Op. 2
- Three Musical Tableaux from Ossian, Op. 56
  - Lake Lyano
  - Kolyma's Lament
  - Ossian's Monologue on Contemporary Heroes
- Liturgy of St. John Chrysostom, Op. 37
- Vespers, Op. 43
- Jubilee March, Op. 67
- Armenian Rhapsody on National Themes, Op. 48
- Turkish Fragments, Op. 62 (1930)
- Turkish March, Op. 55 (1932)
- An Episode from the Life of Schubert, Op. 61 (1920)

== Legacy ==
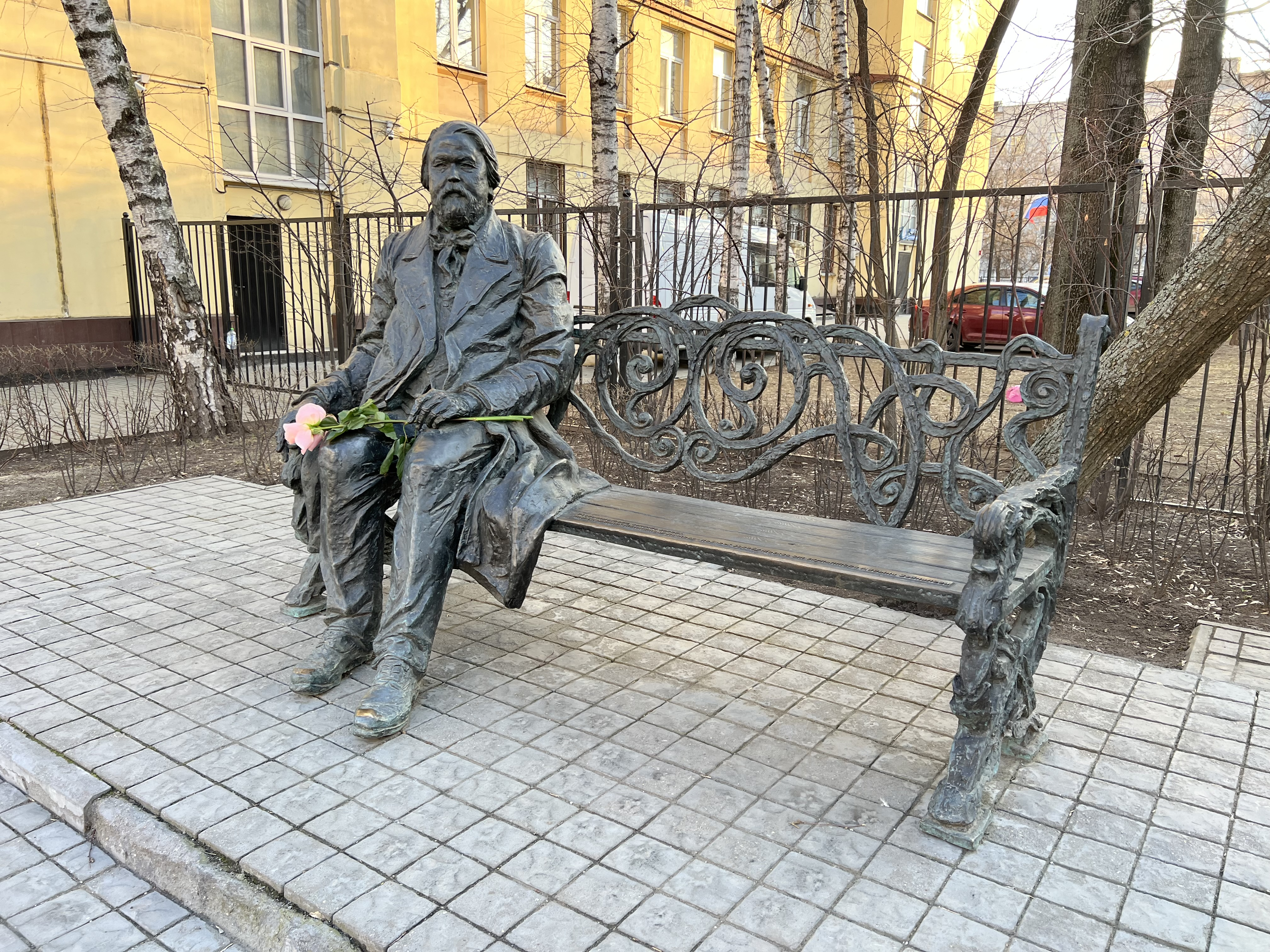
Sculpture of Ippolitov-Ivanov in Moscow

In 2019 the sculpture of Mikhail Ippolitov-Ivanov was opened in Moscow, Russia (Aydyn Zeynalov work).
