= Aleksandr Sukhovo-Kobylin =

Russian philosopher and playwright (1817–1903)

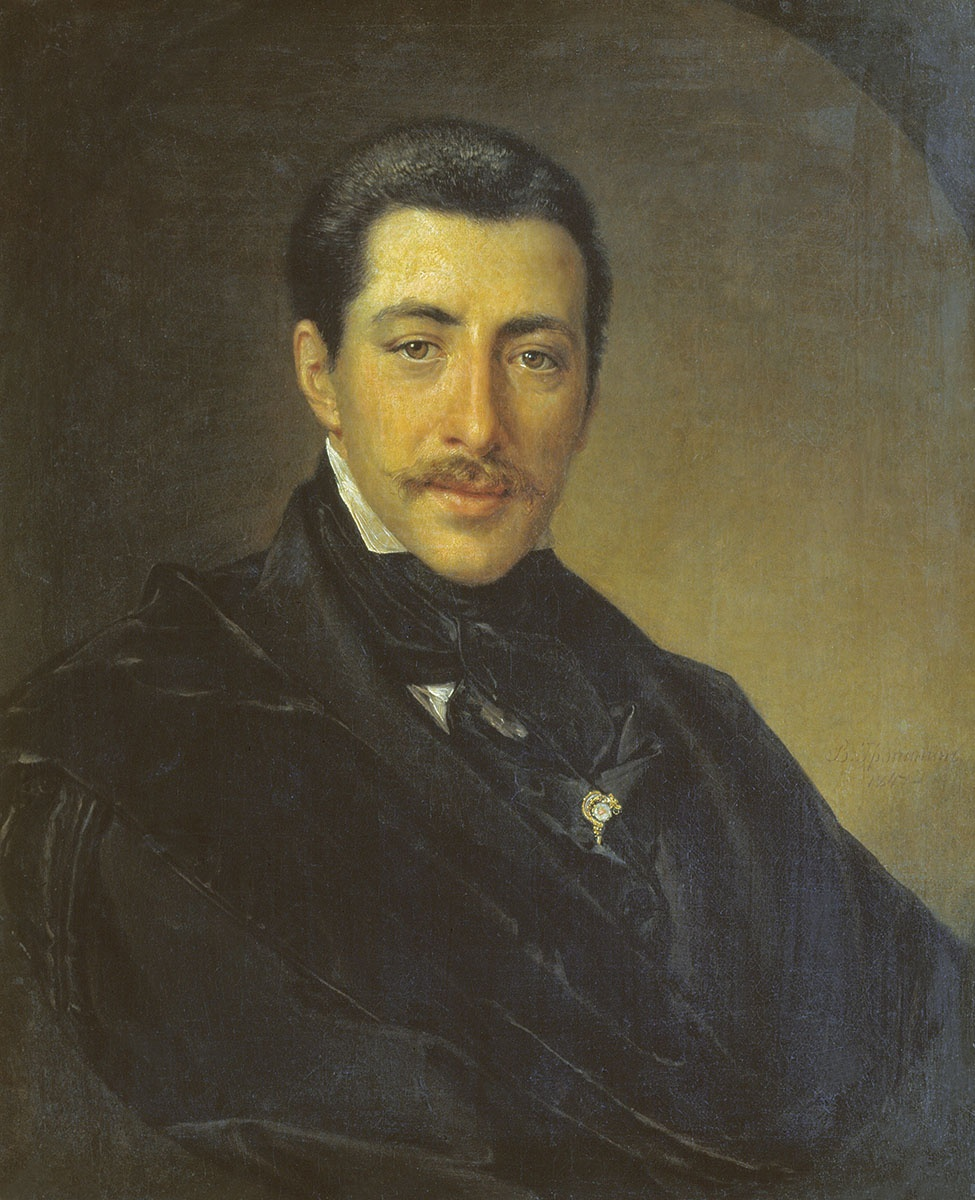
- Portrait by Vasily Tropinin, 1847
- Born: 29 September [O.S. 17 September] 1817; Moscow, Russia
- Died: 24 March 1903 (aged 85); Beaulieu, France
- Writing career
- Notable work: Scenes from the Past

Aleksandr Vasilyevich Sukhovo-Kobylin (Russian: Александр Васильевич Сухово-Кобылин; 29 September [O.S. 17 September] 1817 – 24 March [O.S. 11 March] 1903) was a Russian philosopher and playwright, chiefly known for his satirical plays criticizing Russian imperial bureaucracy. His sister Evgenia Tur was a popular novelist, critic and journalist and his sister Sofia was a painter of some note.

== Biography ==
A rich aristocrat who often travelled, Sukhovo-Kobylin was arrested, prosecuted and tried for seven years in Russia for the murder of his French mistress Louise-Simone Dimanche, a crime of which he is nowadays generally believed to have been innocent. He only managed to achieve acquittal by means of giving enormous bribes to court officials and by using all of his contacts in the Russian elite. According to his own version as well as the generally accepted view today, he was targeted precisely because he had the financial capabilities to give such bribes.

Based on his personal experiences, Sukhovo-Kobylin wrote a trilogy of satirical plays Scenes from the Past (1854–1869) about the prevalence of bribery and other corrupt practices in the absurd bureaucratical system of Russian Empire. First work of the trilogy, Krechinsky's Wedding had immediate success and became one of Russia's most frequently performed plays. The trilogy in its entirety was published in 1869. Attempts to stage the last two plays, The Trial (or The Case) and Tarelkin's Death, ran into difficulties with censorship; in particular, Tarelkin's Death was only staged in 1899. Russian literary critic Varvara Babitskaya thinks that Tarelkin's Death anticipates Franz Kafka's works and the Theatre of the Absurd.

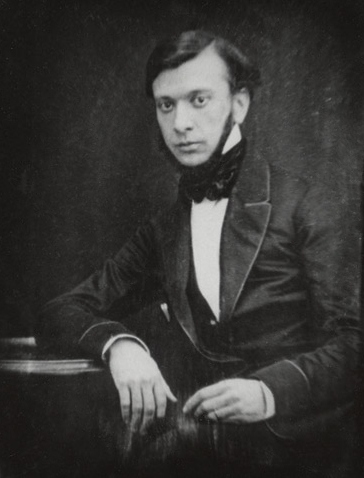
Sukhovo-Kobylin in the early 1850s.

== English Translations ==
- Krechinsky's Wedding: A Comedy in Three Acts, University of Michigan Press, [1961]. Translated by Robert Magidoff.
- The Trilogy of Alexander Sukhovo-Kobylin, Dutton, 1969. (Krechinsky's Wedding, The Case, and The Death of Tarelkin). Translated by Harold B. Segel.

== Sources ==
- "Сухово-Кобылин, Александр Васильевич" . Brockhaus and Efron Encyclopedic Dictionary (in Russian). 1906.
- Гроссман Л. П. Театр Сухово-Кобылина. — Москва; Ленинград, 1940.
- Рудницкий К. Л. А. В. Сухово-Кобылин: Очерк жизни и творчества. — Москва, 1974.
- Старосельская Н. Д. Сухово-Кобылин. — Москва: Молодая гвардия, 2003. — 336 с. — (Жизнь замечательных людей.) ISBN 5-235-02566-0
