= Turkish Fragments =

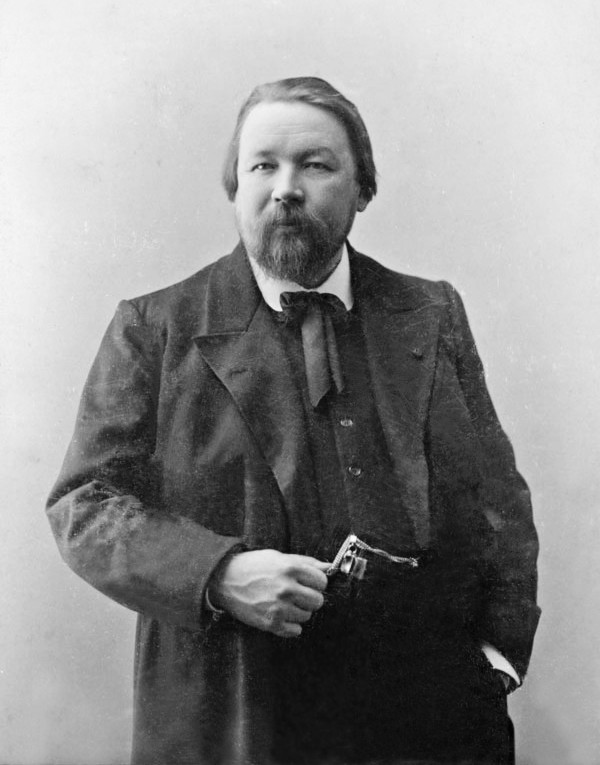
Mikhail Ippolitov-Ivanov

Turkish Fragments, Op. 62 (Russian: Тюркские Фрагменты) is an orchestral suite written in 1930 by Russian composer Mikhail Ippolitov-Ivanov and published in 1931. This suite is sometimes titled as Orchestral Suite No. 3, even though there is no official numbering. This work for large orchestra was dedicated to Shevket Mamedova, an Azerbaijani soprano.

== Structure ==
This suite has four movements and would take approximately 15 minutes to perform. The movements are listed as follows:

1. Caravan (Караван)
2. At Rest (У становища)
3. Night (Ночью)
4. Festival (На празднике)

All movements use material drawn from Azerbaijani, Turkish, Uzbek and Kazakh folk music. The Turkish fragments contain dominant chimes, strings and beats. The Caravan has a steady, ambitious beat and a characteristic Turkish melody that goes on for the entire piece, and is the loudest of all the Fragments. At Rest is rhythmic but tranquil, with a central section of a livelier nature. Night is a peaceful, quieter part that reflects its name; it has plenty of Turkish melodies and also has a central, livelier section. Festival closes this suite. It consists of a dance, sounding upbeat and at times peaceful.

== Notable recordings ==
Notable recordings of this suite include:

Orchestra	Conductor	Record Company	Year of Recording	Format
Singapore Symphony Orchestra	Choo Hoey	Marco Polo	1989	CD
National Symphony Orchestra of Ukraine	Arthur Fagen	Naxos Records	1995	CD
