= Evgenia Tur =

Russian writer in the 1850s–60s

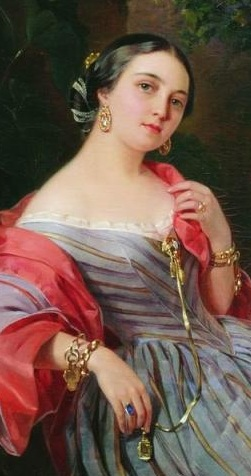
- Portrait by Pimen Orlov, 1847
- Full name: Countess Elizaveta Vasilyevna Salias De Tournemire
- Born: Elizaveta Vasilyevna Sukhovo-Kobylina; 24 August 1815; Moscow, Russian Empire
- Died: 27 March 1892 (aged 76); Warsaw, Congress Poland, Russian Empire
- Noble family: Sukhovo-Kobylina
- Spouse: Count Andrey Salias de Tournemire
- Issue: Evgeny Salias De Tournemire; Maria Andreevna Salias de Tournemire; Olga Andreevna Salias de Tournemire
- Father: Vasily Sukhovo-Kobylin
- Mother: Maria Ivanovna Shepeleva
- Occupation: Author

Evgeniia Tur (Russian: Евге́ния Тур; 24 August 1815 – 27 March 1892) was a Russian writer, children's writer, critic, editor, journalist, publisher, salon hostess, and translator. Evgeniia Tur was the penname for Elizaveta Vasilyevna Sukhovo-Kobylina, who became Countess Elizaveta Vasilyevna Salias De Tournemire after marrying Count Andrey Salias de Tournemire. Evgeniia Tur had several accomplished relatives: Tur's son Evgeny Salias De Tournemire was a novelist, Tur's brother Alexsandr Sukhovo-Kobylin was a playwright and dramatist, and Tur's sister Sofia Sukhovo-Kobylina was a painter.

== Early years ==
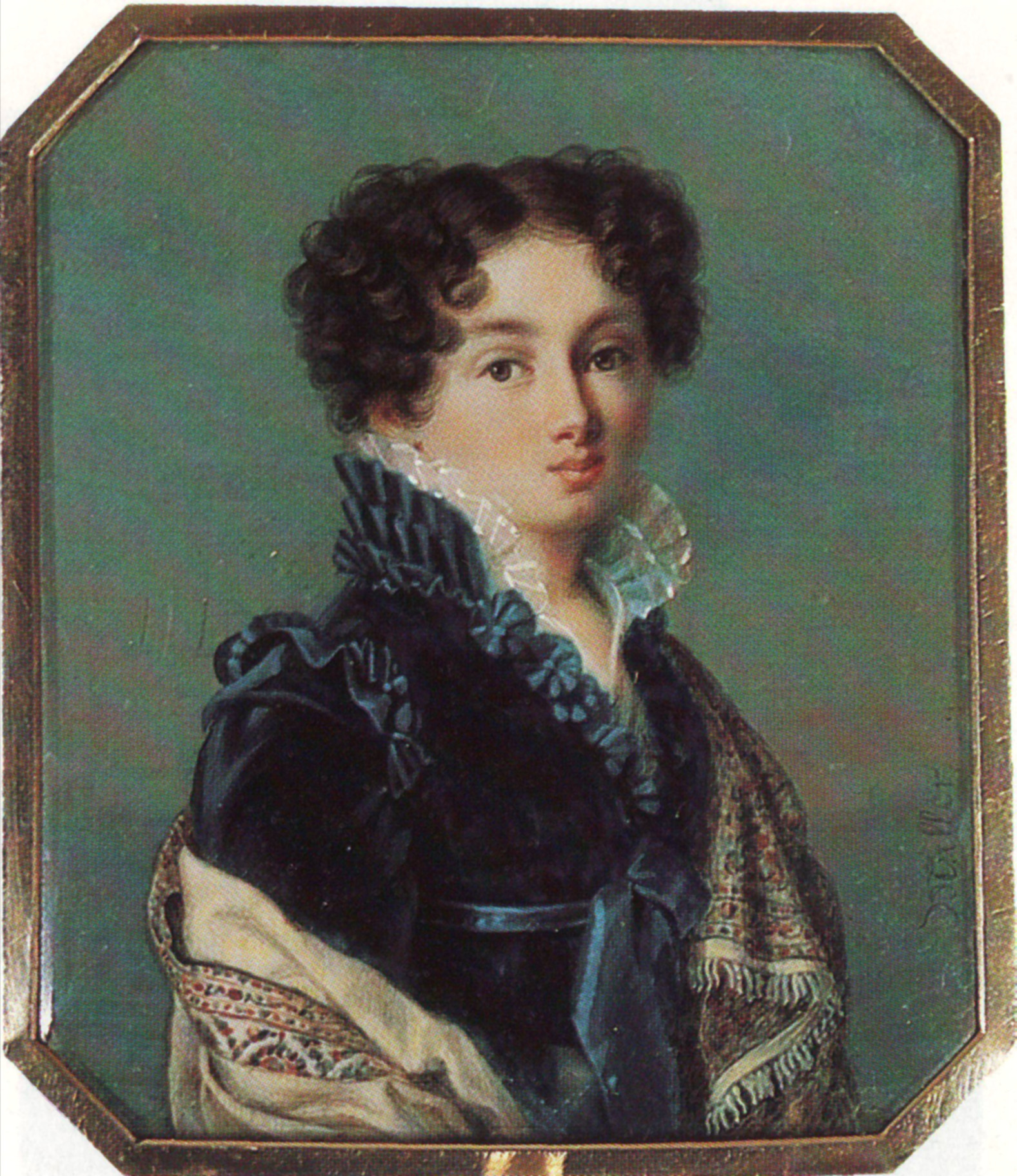
Maria Ivanovna Shepeleva, Evgeniia's mother.

Tur was born in Moscow into the noble family of the Sukhovo-Kobylins. Tur's father was Vasily Sukhovo-Kobylin (1782–1873), a veteran of the Napoleonic wars and Marshal of the Nobility for the Podolsk district in Moscow. Tur's mother was Maria Ivanovna Sukhovo-Kobylina, née Shepeleva (1789–1862), leader of a salon for a select group of accomplished intellectuals and literati. Tur's time spent alongside high society was viewed as the potential inspiration for her later written works.

Tur received an excellent education at home, as her and her siblings were taught by various professors from Moscow University.

In 1835, Tur expressed her desire to marry Nadezhdin, a journalist of a lower social class. Shortly thereafter, Tur and Nadezhdin's planned elopement failed. The marriage was strongly opposed by the Sukhovo-Kobylins, who soon took her abroad to marry a French aristocrat named Count Andrei Sailhas de Tournemire. The Count was later exiled to France for dueling, leaving Tur with their three children in Moscow. Tur was financially sponsored by her sister Evdokiia Petrovo-Solovovo until she began her writing career in 1849.

Following the Count's exile, Tur began to write novellas, which quickly became hits in the Russian literary world.

== Literary Career ==
Tur's first dalliances in the literary world began when she was seeing Nadezhdin, as she anonymously translated in his journal Telescope in the 1830s. Tur's first novel to appear under her pseudonym was published in 1849 in Contemporary, titled Oshibka, and it was very highly received. Tur's next work, a novella called A Mistake, led to her being known as the Russian George Sand.

Tur's next published work was the four-part novel named The Niece in 1851, which was also favorably received by critics. The Niece follows the life of Masha, an orphaned girl who struggles through childhood to reach her eventual role as a mother. This novel seems to set up several of the themes which Tur reuses in her novels: the transition from childhood to adulthood for women, namely becoming a mother, and a difficult love life which ends in misfortune.

This formula is emulated in Tur's later novel Antonina, which explores Antonina's transition from girlhood to motherhood in great detail. However, Antonina was different from other Russian and Western European literature of the time, as Antonina was able to keep her reputation in good standing for the duration of the novel, unlike most Russian or Western European heroines who often face scrutiny from society or fall from high stations of social class throughout their transition from girlhood to motherhood. Antonina returns in Tur's short story "Two Sisters", where she is given even more depth.

Tur went on to write several more novels in the adult literary sphere before she eventually switched to children's literature. Tur supposedly switched genres because she "could not subscribe to the materialistic values of the radical critics who increasingly controlled the literary market."

Tur's work in children's literature was also very well received, and she was able to write in a variety of subgenres such as historical fiction, fairy tales, and historical-religious works. The most famous of Tur's works in children's fiction include The Children of King Louis XVI, A Crystal Heart, The Shalonskii Family, and The Sacred History of the Old Testament. Tur used her children's novels to convey deeply important messages and controversial topics using themes of human morality, religious duty and conversion, and social and class struggles. As Tur continued to write children's literature, she seemingly became increasingly conservative. This was shown in her works through her writing tone and the inclusion of her own thoughts on state and religious matters. Nearing the end of her children's writing career, Tur began including excerpts from the Bible to emphasize her messages to children.

== Criticism of Tur ==
While Tur's work received much praise, it was also strongly criticized. The Niece (1851) received both love and hate from critics, most notably that which came from Ivan Turgenev. Turgenev was known for being exceedingly critical of Russian women writers' work, as he concludes that "there is something not quite right, not literary, that rushes straight from the heart, something not thought through to the end," about women writers and their works. However, Turgenev was said to have greatly respected Tur and her work. Despite Turgenev's scathing assessment, Tur's written works continued to do well. Tur is thought to have avoided the plight of male writing, that is writing in grandiose structure or tedious form, as she is praised for her ability to write in plain and smooth language, like that of "old nobility", a social class Tur is a part of and greatly familiar with. Tur was later invited to join the Society of Lovers of Russian Letters as an honorary member in 1859 due to her accomplishments as an author.

Recent literary scholars have begun to analyze Russian women's literature, a subject that had not been previously explored. Jehanne Gheith's article in The Russian Review breaks down Tur's Antonina in comparison to Turgenev's Dnevnik, stating that Tur's writing highlights the common presence of the "superfluous man" used by Turgenev and other Russian male authors. Gheith goes on to state that Tur's rewrite of Turgenev's Dnevnik gives women more influence and that "the definition of what constitutes "social action" needs to be broadened" in regards to women's writing. Gheith claims that Tur moves the attention away from the "superfluous man" and onto the heroine in Antonina, allowing the heroine to act for herself and maintain a sense of agency. Gheith finishes her analysis of Tur by stating that Tur's Antonina provided space for women to begin writing about "Necessary Women", or the women in the background: young girls and mothers.

== Tur's Literary Criticism ==
While Tur originally wrote essays for the Russian Herald run by Mikhail Katkov in the 1850s, she later split from the magazine due to a disagreement with Katkov. Their disagreement stemmed from Tur's scathing review of Sofia Petrovna Svechina and her views on Catholicism. Tur was initially hired as Russia wanted a spokeswoman for women's literature, as England had the Brontes and Jane Austen and France had George Sand. Tur then established her own magazine named Russian Speech: A Review of Literature, History, Art, and Society in the West and in Russia. Tur primarily published her own work, but she recruited other accomplished Russian writers to Russian Speech to boost its popularity and sales. Tur attempted to work with Turgenev himself, and while he agreed to write for the Russian Speech he was never published in the journal. While Russian Speech's run time was only just over a year (13 months), Tur wrote some of her best works of literary criticism for the journal, even focusing on her own works. Tur also introduced now renowned authors to Russia such as Nikolai Leskov, Vasilii Sleptsov, and Aleksei Suvorin, as she helped them establish their careers using her magazine.

Tur's critical works became increasingly popular following the success of her novels. Tur often wrote on the literary works and personal lives of prominent figures in society, both from Russia and from the West.

As a prominent spokesperson for women's writing, Tur's analysis on Charlotte Bronte's Jane Eyre was to be expected. Bronte's work was often drawn into the debate of Russian women's literature, thus giving Tur the space and reason to write "Miss Bronte, her life and work". Tur's criticism of Bronte suggests that women's literature, including her own writing and Bronte's, is produced to sooth a woman's soul or act as a tool for living vicariously through their written characters. Tur goes on to plainly assert that "a male pseudonym acts as a mask hiding a woman's face which allows her to think and feel in a way that she would not dare to do in real life." Tur's criticism of Bronte concludes by alluding that English literature written by women in the 1850s and 1860s did affect Russian women writer's writing in this period.

== Salon Life and Politics ==
Despite being increasingly successful and busy with her journalism and literary criticism, Tur was also immensely active in the salon culture of Moscow. Her salon in Moscow housed, in the words of Turgenev, "all the brilliant world," with literary figures such as Vasilii Botkin, Timofei Granovskii, Nikolai Ogarev, and Turgenev himself. Even after relocating to France for the duration of the 1860s, Tur's salon was constantly filled with the usual literary greats as well as outstanding political figures: Prince Nikolai Orlov, Mikhail Bakunin, various members of Russian nobility and gentry, Polish politicians, and radical leader Aleksandr Sleptsov.

Tur's political opinions changed vastly throughout her life. In the 1840s and 1850s Tur was an avid follower and friend of Granovskii, a scholar of Western medieval histories, suggesting that she was a liberal. In the 1860s, Tur supported the movement for Polish independence, closely tying her with radicals. Finally, in Tur's later years she became significantly more conservative. Tur's ever-growing conservative ties became increasingly visible in her final works of children's literature. Tur frequently quotes the Bible and states her opinion plainly on supporting the autocratic system of government and the Orthodox Church.

== Later years ==
In the Fall of 1861 Tur's life underwent considerable change. The secret police's surveillance of Tur led to her departure to France. This was directly following her support of the student demonstrations at Moscow University, where her son Evgeny attended. Tur anonymously published her thoughts and opinions in favor of the student demonstrations in the journal Bell, suggesting that she strongly agrees with their cause.

Once she relocated to France, Tur primarily focused on writing historical and children's literature, shown through her publication of A Crystal Heart (1873), The Shalonskii Family (1880), Martyrs of the Coliseum (1884), The Life of Saint Macarius the Egyptian (1885), and The Children of King Louis XVI (1885).

Tur spent her last years living in Warsaw, where she died at the age of 77 in March of 1892.

== English Translations ==
- The Shalonski Family, (novel), Remington and Co, London, 1882. from Google Books
- Antonina, (novel), Northwestern University Press, 1996.
