= List of Russian Empire films =

A list of films produced in the Russian Empire between 1908 and 1917. For Russian films of 1917–1991 see List of Soviet films.

== Before 1910 ==
Title	Director	Cast	Genre	Notes
1908
The Big Man (Большой человек)	Alexander Drankov		drama/satire	Lost film
Find Your Face	Vasil Amashukeli			
The Marriage of Krechinsky (Свадьба Кречинского)	Alexander Drankov			
Moscow Clad in Snow (Москва в снежном убранстве)	Joseph-Louis Mundwiller			
Seaside Walk	Vasil Amashukeli			
Stenka Razin (Стенька Разин)	Vladimir Romashkov			
A Zealous Batman (Усердный денщик)	N. Filippov			
1909
16th Century Russian Wedding (Русская свадьба 16 века)	Vasily Goncharov			
Boyarin Orsha (Боярин Орша)	Pyotr Chardynin			
Dead Souls (Мёртвые души)	Pyotr Chardynin			
The Death of Ivan the Terrible (Смерть Ивана Грозного)	Vasily Goncharov and Yakov Protazanov			
Dimitri Donskoj (Эпизод из жизни Дмитрия Донского)	Kai Hansen			
Drama in a Gypsy Camp near Moscow (Драма в таборе подмосковных цыган)	Vladimir Siversen			
Drama in Moscow (Драма в Москве)	Vasily Goncharov			
The Fountain of Bakhchisaray (Бахчисарайский фонтан)	Yakov Protazanov			Lost film
The Happy-Go-Lucky Merchant (Ухарь-купец)	Vasily Goncharov			
Mazeppa (Мазепа)	Vasily Goncharov			
The Power of Darkness (Власть тьмы)	Pyotr Chardynin			
Resurrection (Воскрешение)	unknown			
Song About the Merchant Kalashnikov (Песнь про купца Калашникова)	Vasily Goncharov			Lost film
Taras Bulba (Тарас Бульба)	Alexander Drankov			
The Sorceress (Чародейка)	Pyotr Chardynin and Vasily Goncharov			
Vanka the Steward (Ванька-ключник)	Vasily Goncharov			
Viy (Вий)	Vasily Goncharov			

== 1910–1917 ==
Title	Director	Cast	Genre	Notes
1910
The Duel (Поединок)	Maurice Maître			
The Idiot (Идиот)	Pyotr Chardynin			
Lucanus Cervus (Жук-олень)	Wladyslaw Starewicz			
Peter the Great (Пётр Великий)	Vasili Goncharov			
Princess Tarakanova (Княжна Тараканова)	Kai Hansen, Maurice Maître			
The Queen of Spades (Пиковая дама)	Pyotr Chardynin			
The Water Nymph (Русалка)	Vasili Goncharov			
1911
Anna Karenina (Анна Каренина)	Maurice Maître			
Defence of Sevastopol (Оборона Севастополя)	Vasily Goncharov			
Eugene Onegin; Евгений Онегин	Vasili Goncharov			
The Kreutzer Sonata	Pyotr Chardynin			
Romance with Double-Bass (Роман с контрабасом)	Kai Hanson			
1912
1812 (1812 год)	Vasili Goncharov, Kai Hansen, Aleksandr Uralsky			
The Beautiful Leukanida (Прекрасная Люканида, или Война усачей с рогачам)	Wladyslaw Starewicz			
The Cameraman's Revenge (Месть кинематографического оператора)	Wladyslaw Starewicz			
Departure of a Grand Old Man (Уход великого старца)	Yakov Protazanov and Elizaveta Thiman			
1913
The Grasshopper and the Ant (Стрекоза и муравей)				
The Night Before Christmas (Ночь перед Рождеством)	Ladislas Starevich			
The Little House in Kolomna (Домик в Коломне)	Pyotr Chardynin			
Twilight of a Woman's Soul (Сумерки женской души)	Yevgeni Bauer			
Uncle's Apartment (Дядюшкина квартира)	Pyotr Chardynin, Yevgeni Bauer			
1914
Anna Karenina (Анна Каренина)	Vladimir Gardin			
A Nest of Noblemen (Дворянское гнездо)	Vladimir Gardin			
Chrysanthemums (Хризантемы)	Pyotr Chardynin			
Daughter of Albion Illegal	Boris Glagolin			
Drama in the Futurists' Cabaret No. 13 (Драма в кабаре футуристов № 13)	Vladimir Kasyanov and/or Mikhail Larionov			
The Fugitive (Беглец)	Alexandre Volkoff			
The Girl from the Street; Дитя большого города	Yevgeni Bauer			
Glory to Us, Death to the Enemy (Слава - нам, смерть - врагам)	Yevgeni Bauer			
Silent Witnesses (Немые свидетели)	Yevgeni Bauer			
1915
After Death (После смерти)	Yevgeni Bauer			
Children of the Age (Дети века)	Yevgeni Bauer			
Daydreams (Грёзы)	Yevgeni Bauer			
Mirages (Миражи)	Pyotr Chardynin			
The 1002nd Ruse (Тысяча вторая хитрость)	Yevgeny Bauer			
The Picture of Dorian Grey (Портрет Дориана Грея)	Vsevolod Meyerhold, Mikhail Doronin	Varvara Yanova, Vsevolod Meyerhold, G. Enriton, P. Belova	Drama	
The Portrait (Портрет)	Vladislav Starevich			
Song of Triumphant Love (Песнь торжествующей любви)	Yevgeni Bauer			
1916
A Life for a Life (Жизнь за жизнь)	Yevgeni Bauer			
Chess of Life (Шахматы жизни)	Alexander Uralskiy			
In the Kingdom of Oil and Millions (В царстве нефти и миллионов)	Boris Svetlov			
Miss Peasant (Барышня - крестьянка)	Vladimir Gardin and Olga Preobrazhenskaya			
The Queen of Spades (Пиковая дама)	Yakov Protazanov			
Thought (Мысль)	Vladimir Gardin and Joseph Soiffer			
1917
By the Fireplace (У камина)	Pyotr Chardynin			
The Cloth Peddler (Arshin mal-alan)	Boris Svetlov			
The Dying Swan (Умирающий лебедь)	Yevgeni Bauer			
The King of Paris (Король Парижа)	Yevgeni Bauer			
Father Sergius (Отец Сергий)	Yakov Protazanov			
For Happiness (За счастьем)	Yevgeny Bauer			
Satan Triumphant (Сатана ликующий)	Yakov Protazanov			
