= Ukhar Kupets =

1909 silent Russian film

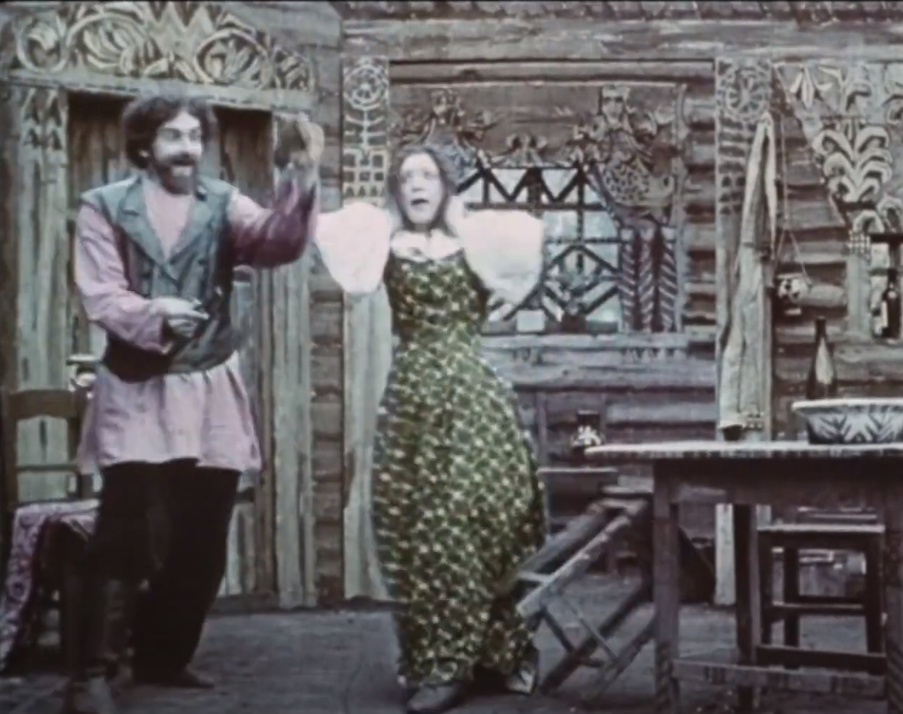
The drunk "dashing merchant" cuts off a braid of the seduced girl

Ukhar Kupets (Russian: Ухарь купец; the title is variously translated as The Dashing Merchant or The Happy-Go-Lucky Merchant) is a 1909 silent (Russian-language intertitles) short drama film shot by the Moscow division of the French company Pathé Frères. It was the first hand-colored Russian film. It was based on the folk song known under the same title based on the 1859 short poem Ехал из ярмарки ухарь-купец by Ivan Nikitin.

== Background ==
In 1908 Pathé launched a series Picturesque Russia of documentary films about Russia, such as Moscow Clad in Snow. It was mostly targeting foreign audience and had limited success in Russia. The same year Aleksandr Drankov set up the first Russian film studio and shot the first Russian feature film, to a huge success. This encouraged Pathé to establish a division in Moscow with Russian actors and filmmakers. In 1909 they started to work on three films: Ukhar Kupets, Peter the Great and An Episode from the Life of Dmitry Donskoy (Dmitry Donskoy), the latter two released in 1910.

== Plot ==
The plot may be inferred from the intertitles of the film, which basically follows the plot of the song: (1) "Masha asks permission from her mother to go for a walk along the village"; (2) "Hoping to get a free drink from the merchant, the father allows the merchant to woo the daughter"; (3) A couplet from a version of the song: "По всей деревне славушка прошла / Красавица дочка на зорьке пришла" (A rumor passed through the whole village / The pretty daughter came back at dawn) (4) another couplet: По всей деревне погасли огни. Старые и малые спать полегли (The lights went out throughout the village. The old and young went to bed) (5)another couplet: В одной лишь избенке огонек горит. Старый отец, разметавшись, лежит.(There islight in only one hut. The old father lies scattered.)

Gosfilmofond describes the plot as: "1. Masha asks her parents for permission to go for a walk to the fair. 2. Parents go there too. 3. Scene: in the village square various goods are sold, young people and girls dance and sing. 4. Masha's father, having decided to drink at the merchant's expense, allows him to court Masha. 5. Father drinks in a tavern. 6. The merchant hugs Masha and gives her wine, and then takes her to the hotel room. 7. The mother is at home waiting for her husband and daughter. A drunken husband arrives. 9. The merchant and Masha leave the bedroom. He cuts her hair and sends her out into the street. 10. Disgraced Masha comes home. The parents of the sorrowful girl are in despair".

== Cast ==
- Ардатов, Г., merchant
- Королёва, М., Masha
- Славин, А., father
- Горева, Е. mother

== Crew ==
- Vasily Goncharov, director (listed in the subtitles, but his input is disputed), screenplay; also Kai Hansen (Kaï Hansen) and Морис Гаш (?Maurice Gache).
- Mikhail Kozhin, production designer (decorations, hand-coloring)
- Joseph-Louis Mundwiller (as Georges Meyer) and Toppi (?Tapis), cinematographers

== Criticism ==
Critics praised the ethnographical authenticity of the scenery of the film. However Pyotr Nilus wrote in 1916: "Стоит вспомнить фильму на тему песни об «ухаре-купце», более омерзительного, некультурного изображения, кажется, никогда еще не видел экран." (It is worth recalling the film on the theme of the song about the "Ukhar-kupets", a more disgusting, uncultured image, it seems, has never been seen on the screen.)

== See also ==
- Korobeiniki, Russian folk song about haggling and seduction
