= 1812 (1912 film) =

1912 Russian film

- Russian: 1812 год
- Directed by: Vasili Goncharov; Kai Hansen; Aleksandr Uralsky
- Starring: Vasili Goncharov; Aleksandra Goncharova; Andrey Gromov; Pavel Knorr; V. Serjozhinikov; A. Veskov
- Cinematography: Louis Forestier; Aleksandr Levitsky; Joseph-Louis Mundwiller; Alexander Rillo
- Release date: 1912
- Running time: 48 minute
- Country: Russian Empire

1812, (Russian: 1812 год) is a 1912 Russian film directed by Vasili Goncharov, Kai Hansen and Aleksandr Uralsky, described as a "blockbuster" in the Historical Dictionary of Russian and Soviet Cinema.

== Plot ==
The film in four parts illustrates the events Patriotic War of 1812.

== Starring ==
- Vasili Goncharov
- Aleksandra Goncharova
- Andrey Gromov
- Pavel Knorr as Napoleon
- V. Serjozhinikov
- A. Veskov
