= Eugene Onegin (1911 film) =

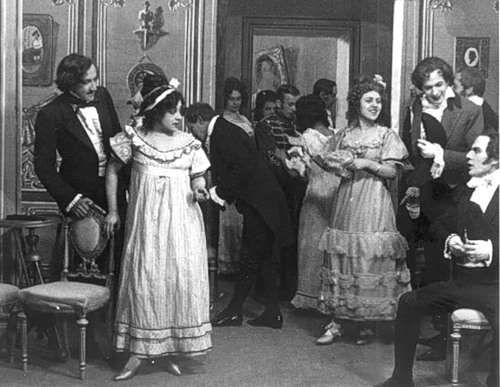
- Russian: Евгений Онегин
- Directed by: Vasili Goncharov
- Written by: Alexander Pushkin (poem); Pyotr Ilyich Tchaikovsky (libretto); Vasili Goncharov (screenplay); Konstantin Shikovsky (author)
- Starring: Lyubov Varyagina; Aleksandra Goncharova; Pyotr Chardynin; Aleksandr Gromov; Arseny Bibikov; Petr Birjukov; Andrey Gromov
- Cinematography: Louis Forestier
- Release date: 1911
- Country: Russian Empire

Eugene Onegin, (Russian: Евгений Онегин) is a 1911 Russian short film directed by Vasili Goncharov. Numerous scenes from the opera were used, whilst the dual between Eugene Onegin and Lensky was shortened to just a gunshot.

== Plot ==
The film is based on the 1825-1832 poem Eugene Onegin by Alexander Pushkin.

== Starring ==
- Lyubov Varyagina as Tatyana
- Aleksandra Goncharova as Ol'ga
- Pyotr Chardynin as Onegin
- Aleksandr Gromov as Lensky
- Arseny Bibikov as Gremin
- Petr Birjukov
- Andrey Gromov
