= Alexandr Vyrubov =

Russian actor and director (1882–1962)

- Александр Вырубов
- Born: 21 July 1882; Russian Empire
- Died: 2 June 1962 (aged 79); Russian House, Cormeilles-en-Parisis, Paris
- Resting place: Sainte-Geneviève-des-Bois cemetery
- Occupation: Actor
- Years active: 1914–1918

Alexandr Vyrubov (Russian: Александр Вырубов; (21 July 1882 – 2 June 1962) was a Russian actor and director.

== Life ==
Vyrubov was born 21 July 1882 in Yalta, which was then part of the Russian Empire.

He played at the Moscow Art Theatre. He acted in films. He was one of the first residents of the Nirnzee house.

In 1922 he emigrated from Russia. Lived in Berlin and Paris. He was a member of the Prague group of the Moscow Art Theatre (1922–1929), and participated in its Paris tour from 1926. He performed in concerts and at charity events. In 1929 he was a member of the troupe of the Russian Intimate Theatre of D. N. Kirova. Then he moved to the Riga Drama Theatre. From 1948 he was back in Paris; he played at the Russian Drama Theatre (1950-1954), the Russian Theatre (directed by K. Konstantinov) (1955-1957).

In the 1950s, he participated in meetings of the Circle of Friends and Admirers of I. S. Shmelev, in evenings in memory of N. V. Gogol, F. I. Chaliapin, N. A. Teffi, N. N. Evreinov, I. A. Bunin and others.

He spent his last years in the Russian House in Cormeilles-en-Parisis, where he died on 2 June 1962. He was buried in the Sainte-Geneviève-des-Bois cemetery.

== Selected filmography ==
- 1915 — Daydreams
- 1915 — Children of the Age
- 1915 — Irina Kirsanova
- 1915 — Mirages
