= The Song of the Merchant Kalashnikov =

Poem by Mikhail Lermontov

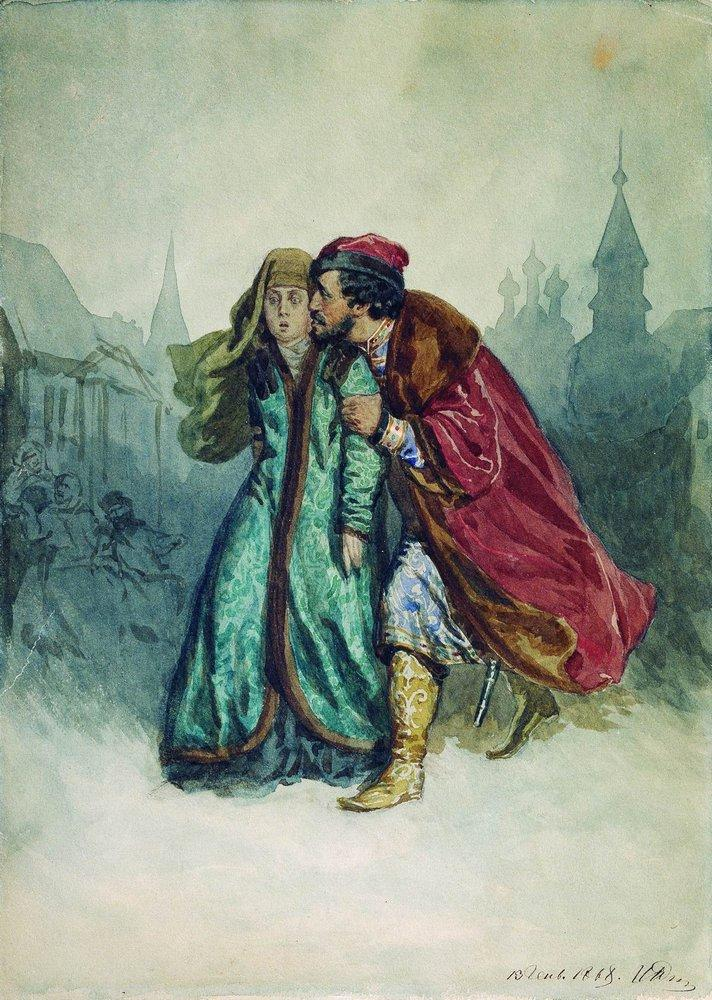
The merchant Kalashnikov. Watercolour by Ilya Repin (1868)

A Song about Tsar Ivan Vasilyevich, the Young Oprichnik, and the Valorous Merchant Kalashnikov (Russian: Песня про царя Ивана Васильевича, молодого опричника и удалого купца Калашникова), often abbreviated as The Song of the Merchant Kalashnikov, is a poem by Mikhail Lermontov written in 1837 and first published in 1838.

The plot of the poem is set during Oprichnina times. Rhythmically, Kalashnikov is patterned after bylina, the Russian folk epic. Its most famous scene describes a fistfight between the protagonists, Kalashnikov and oprichnik Kiribeevich.

== Plot ==
The first scene of the poem describes a banquet at the Tsar's palace. Ivan the Terrible is strictly watching his Boyars and Oprichniki and suddenly notices that the young Oprichnik named Kiribeevich doesn't eat or drink anything and doesn't seem to enjoy the feast. When asked for a reason, Kiribeevich tells the Tsar that he fell in love with a girl named Alyona Dmitrievna. Ivan wants to help his favorite Oprichnik to organize the wedding and gives him expensive jewelry to be gifted to his future bride. But Kiribeevich doesn't mention the fact that Alyona Dmitrievna is already married to a merchant named Stepan Kalashnikov.

Very late in the evening of the same day, Alyona Dmitrievna, bareheaded, her clothes ripped, comes to her house and tells Stepan that Kiribeevich abused her when she was on her way home from the church. Kalashnikov decides to defend the honor of his family and to avenge his wife by fighting the Oprichnik in a fistfight.

The fistfight is held the next morning, with the Tsar attending. Kiribeevich, being considered the best fighter, calls anyone to fight him, but no one dares. Suddenly, Kalashikov comes and accepts the challenge. Allegorically, the merchant makes Oprichnik understand who he is and why he wants to fight Kiribeevich, much to latter's concern.

Before fighting, Kiribeevich bows to Ivan The Terrible. Kalashnikov first bows to the Tsar, then to Kremlin and churches – and, finally, to all the Russian people.

The fistfight begins. Kiribeevich strikes his opponent in his chest so hard that merchant's copper crucifix bent and entered Kalashnikov's flesh. But the merchant gets up and strikes back, hitting Oprichnik in his temple and thus killing him. Such actions were prohibited by Russian law, and the violator was to be executed.

Furious, Ivan IV asks Kalashnikov if he has done it accidentally or not. Being a novice fighter, Kalashnikov could refer to his lack of experience, but instead he confesses that he had done it voluntarily and agrees to the death penalty. The Tsar, amazed by the merchant's sincerity, fulfills his last wish: to take care of his family.

== Adaptations ==
- The Merchant Kalashnikov - opera by Anton Rubinstein
- Song About the Merchant Kalashnikov (film) - 1909 Russian film directed by Vasily Goncharov
