= Vanka =

Vanka may refer to:

- A diminutive form of the name Ivan
- Maksimilijan Vanka, Croatian-American artist
- Vanka Pratap

== Fiction and fictional characters ==
- Green-Vanka, Russian fairy tale
- A character from the show Monster Warriors
- "Vanka" (short story), a story by Anton Chekhov
- Vanka the Steward, a 1909 Russian short romantic drama film based on the Russian folk song with the same name
