= The Good Doctor (play) =

Play written by Neil Simon

The Good Doctor is a comedy with music written by Neil Simon. It is a series of short plays based on short stories and other works of Russian writer Anton Chekhov, framed by a writer commenting on them.

== Productions ==
The Good Doctor opened on Broadway at the Eugene O'Neill Theatre on November 27, 1973, and closed on May 25, 1974, after 208 performances and eight previews. Produced by Emanuel Azenberg and directed by A.J. Antoon, it starred René Auberjonois, Barnard Hughes, Marsha Mason, Christopher Plummer, and Frances Sternhagen.

Frances Sternhagen won the Tony Award for Best Featured Actress in a Play, and the play received three additional Tony Award nominations: Best Original Score (Peter Link and Neil Simon), Best Featured Actor in a Play (René Auberjonois), and Best Lighting Design (Tharon Musser). Clive Barnes wrote in The New York Times that "There is much fun here-or at least here and there. It is, however, too anecdotal, with most stories closing with the dramatic ring of a punch-line. Mr. Simon's comic fancy is admirable."

Simon met his second wife, Marsha Mason, during auditions for this play.

A revival was produced by The Melting Pot Theater, at the Theater of the Riverside Church, New York City, from February 1998 through March 1, 1998, with Andre De Shields, Jane Connell, and Gordon Connell.

A television movie was made based on the play, with Edward Asner, Richard Chamberlain, and Marsha Mason. It premiered on PBS' Great Performances on November 8, 1978. Reviewer John O'Connor wrote, "Mr. Simon also includes a special piece for his wife, Marsha Mason, in which the appealing actress gets to play each of The Three Sisters ... . A press release notes that it is difficult to tell where Chekhov stops and Simon begins. That's part of the problem ... . The result falls awkwardly between gentle Chekhovian satire and clever Simon wisecracks. Neither writer is served to advantage."

== Plot overview ==
An unnamed writer suffers from writer's block and his own artistic temperament as he narrates to the audience several of his stories:

- "The Sneeze" (based on "The Death of a Government Clerk") - A government clerk over-apologizes and has a nervous breakdown after accidentally sneezing on a general during a night out at the opera.
- "The Governess" (based on "The Nincompoop") - A mother attempts to cheat her children's governess out of her pay by making up offenses and damages for which the governess must "compensate", but then tells her it was a test to see if she would stand up for herself. She did not.
- "Surgery" (based on the eponymous title) - A sexton visits the dentist complaining of a toothache, but the dentist's zeal for his profession begins to frighten his patient.
- "Too Late for Happiness" - An older man and woman contemplate making time for each other in song.
- "The Seduction" - A renowned seducer of married women sets his sights on his best friend's wife, using his friend as an unwitting accomplice in the ploy.
- "The Drowned Man" - An entrepreneurial tramp pretends to drown himself to make money, calling what he does "maritime entertainment".
- "The Audition" - An actress who walked four days from Odessa to Moscow to audition for the writer's next play uses most of her audition time to gush over the writer.
- "A Defenseless Creature" - A woman with a nervous disorder harasses an ill banker to extort money for her injured husband.
- "The Arrangement" - In flashback, the writer's father takes his shy 19-year-old son to a brothel to make him a man.
- "A Quiet War" (optional scene) - Two retired military commanders meet in the park to debate what makes the perfect five-course lunch.
