= Lydia Koreneva =

Russian and Soviet actress (1885–1982)

Lidiya Koreneva
- Лидия Ко́ренева
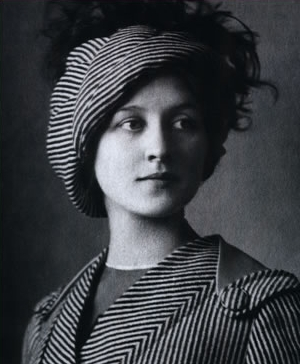
- Koreneva, c. 1908
- Born: July 31, 1885; Tambov, Russia
- Died: July 2, 1982 (aged 96); Moscow, Soviet Union
- Occupation: Stage actress
- Years active: 1907–1958

Lydia Mikhaylovna Koreneva (Russian: Лидия Михайловна Коренева; 31 July [O.S. 19 July] 1885 – 2 July 1982) was a Russian and Soviet stage actress associated with the Moscow Art Theatre.

== Biography ==
Born into a Tambov-based noble family, Koreneva moved to Moscow aged 16 and enrolled into the Moscow Art Theatre's drama school in 1904; she graduated in 1907 and joined the Stanislavski-led troupe. Her first roles included Ksenya in Boris Godunov (1907), Water in The Blue Bird, and Marya Antonovna in Revizor (both 1908), but her breakthrough came on 9 September 1909 when Turgenev's A Month in the Country premiered, and Koreneva's performance as Verochka was lauded by, among many others, Maria Yermolova. The painter and scenic designer of A Month in the Country, Mstislav Dobuzhinsky, infatuated with both the production and Koreneva, made several portraits of her, as did Konstantin Somov. Among her followers at the time were Léon Bakst and Alexander Blok. She was endorsed to play Lise in The Karamazov Brothers as the star and most popular young actress in the Moscow Art Theatre. Her later successes included Anya in The Cherry Orchard (1912), Irina in the Three Sisters (1922–1924, during the theatre's world tour), as well as several parts in the theatre's Dostoyevsky repertoire. From 1915 to 1917, Koreneva was cast in five Russian films, including the Yevgeni Bauer-directed The King of Paris, as Lucienne Marechal.

Koreneva's highly charged, poetic and exalted stage persona proved to be very akin to her real life character, according to theatre historian Inna Solovyova. In 1920s she turned into easily 'the most capricious actress in the history of the Moscow Art Theatre, as the critic Vadim Shverubovich remembered. Mikhail Bulgakov portrayed her sarcastically as the hysterical Lyudmila Silvestrovna Pryakhina in his Theatrical Novel, although several critics warned against taking this caricature at face value. Despite behind close curtain conflicts and scandals, Koreneva's work on stage remained inspired and consistent. In 1938, she was honoured with the title of People's Artist of the RSFSR.

In the 1930s, Koreneva became very close to the Stanislavski family. In 1941, as the Moscow Art Theatre troupe was evacuated from Moscow, she was the only one who stayed behind, so as to provide care to Stanislavski's widow Maria Lilina who was dying of cancer. Koreneva's last major success on stage was Anna Zvezdintseva in Lev Tolstoy's The Fruits of Enlightenment in 1951. A year later, it earned her the Stalin Prize of the first order. In 1958, Koreneva was forced to retire. Scandalized, she swore never to set foot in this theatre and held her promise. She died in Moscow on 2 July 1982, aged 96, and is interred in Vagankovo Cemetery.
