= Song About the Merchant Kalashnikov =

Song About the Merchant Kalashnikov (Песнь про купца Калашникова)
- Directed by: Vasily Goncharov
- Written by: Vasily Goncharov
- Produced by: Aleksandr Khanzhonkov
- Starring: Pyotr Chardynin; Aleksandra Goncharova; Andrey Gromov; Ivan Potyomkin; Antonina Pozharskaya
- Cinematography: Vladimir Siversen
- Music by: Mikhail Ippolitov-Ivanov
- Production company: Khanzhonkov Trading House
- Release date: 15 March 1909
- Running time: 250 metres
- Country: Russian Empire
- Languages: Silent film Russian intertitles

Song About the Merchant Kalashnikov (Russian: Песнь про купца Калашникова, translit. Pesn pro kuptsa Kalashnikova) is a 1909 Russian silent film directed by Vasily Goncharov. The film is believed to be lost.

== Plot ==
The film was loosely based on the eponymous poem by Mikhail Lermontov and consisted of four scenes: the feast at the court of Ivan the Terrible, the assault of Kalashnikov's wife by oprichnik Kiribeevich, the argument between Kalashnikov and Kiribeevich, and the fistfight between the protagonists.

== Production ==
Song About the Merchant Kalashnikov was filmed in 1908 with actors from the troupe of Vvedensky Narodny Dom. Pyotr Chardynin, who later become one of the leading directors of the Russian Empire, debuted in the film as an actor.

== Cast ==
- Pyotr Chardynin as Merchant Kalashnikov
- Aleksandra Goncharova as Kalashnikov's wife
- Andrey Gromov as Oprichnik Kiribeevich
- Ivan Potyomkin as Ivan the Terrible
- Antonina Pozharskaya
