= Aleksandra Goncharova =

Aleksandra Goncharova may refer to:

- Aleksandra Goncharova (cyclist)
- Aleksandra Goncharova (actress)
