= Mikhail Borisovich Potapov =

Russian entomologist and collembologist

Mikhail B. Potapov Михаил Борисович Потапов
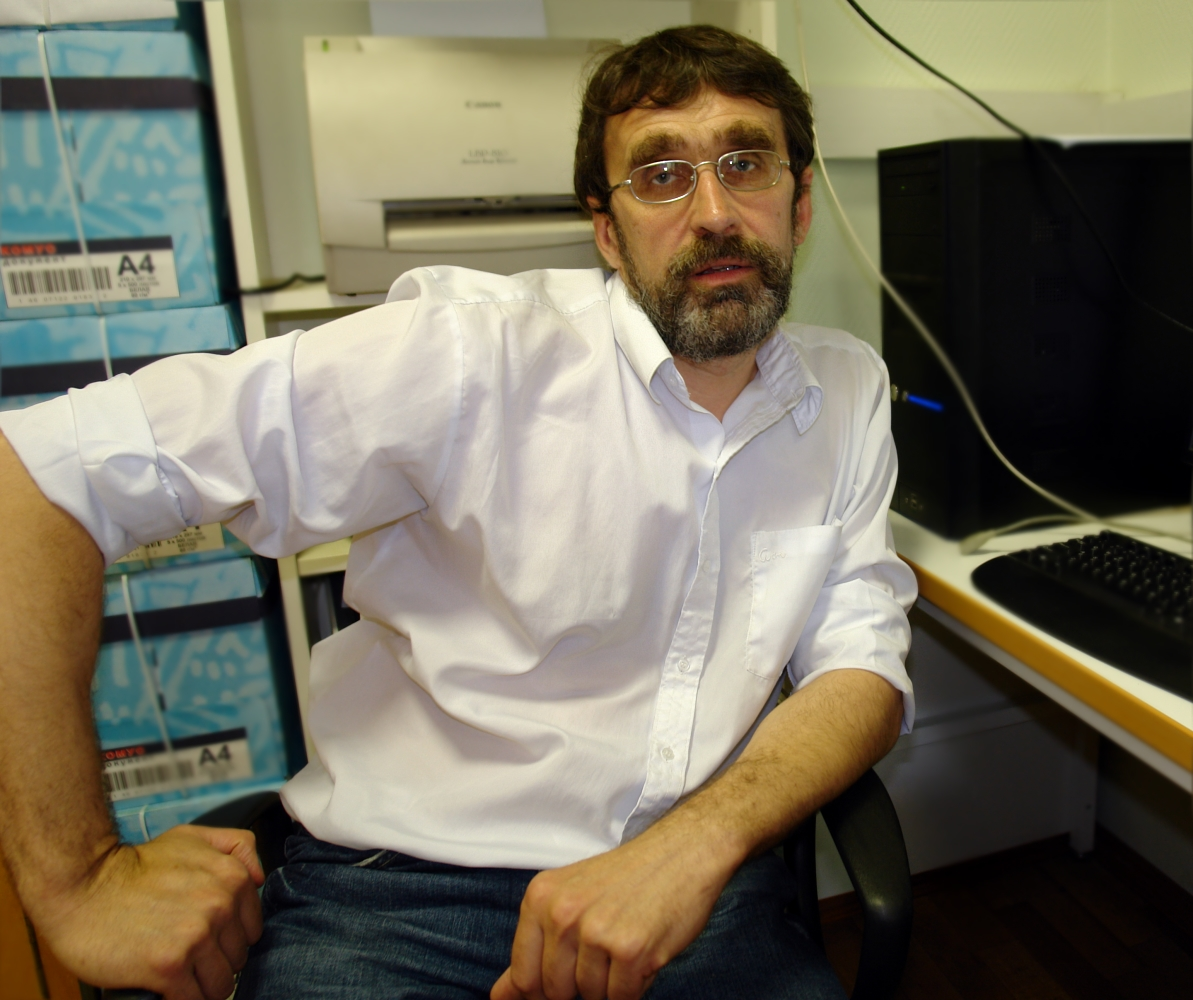
- At the Institute of Biology and Chemistry, MPGU
- Born: 7 January 1963 (age 63); Moscow, Russian SFSR, Soviet Union
- Education: Moscow State Pedagogical Institute
- Known for: Springtail (Collembola) systematics
- Scientific career
- Fields: Entomology, Soil biology, Taxonomy
- Workplaces: MPGU
- Doctoral advisor: prof. Nina Mikhailovna Chernovna

Mikhail Borisovich Potapov (Russian: Михаил Борисович Потапов; born 7 January 1963) is a Soviet and Russian entomologist, a renowned systematist of springtails (Collembola). He has described numerous new species and 19 new genera of springtails, is the author of original methods for studying collembolans, revisions of major taxa, and is a historian of collembology. He works at the Institute of Biology and Chemistry of MPGU.

== Biography ==
Mikhail Potapov was born on 7 January 1963 in Moscow, USSR.

In 1985, he graduated from the Biology and Chemistry Faculty of the Moscow State Pedagogical Institute named after V. I. Lenin (MGPI, now MPGU). Since 1981, under the guidance of Professor Nina Mikhailovna Chernova, he specialized in the systematics of springtails, studying them on expeditions to Azerbaijan, Georgia, Ukraine, Mordovia, the Volga region, Lithuania, and other regions of the USSR.

Since 1985, he worked in the problem laboratory "Dynamics of Populations and Reproduction of Useful Species" at MGPI, simultaneously being a postgraduate student in the Department of Zoology and Darwinism, Biology and Chemistry Faculty, MGPI. In 1989, he was inducted as a member of the Russian Entomological Society.

In 1992, he defended his Candidate of Sciences dissertation on "The Structure of the Genus and Species Characteristics in Springtails of the Family Isotomidae".

Since 1993, he has been a Senior Researcher at the Educational and Scientific Biological Center of the Moscow Pedagogical State University (MPGU). Since 2009 — Leading Researcher at the Educational and Scientific Center for Ecology and Biodiversity of MPGU.

In 2012, he participated in the international project "Springtails of the Pacific Littoral of Asia".

In January 2020, at a meeting of the Moscow Ethological Seminar, he gave a lecture on "The Sexual Behavior of Springtails".

== Scientific contributions ==
He established the subfamily Pachyotominae within the family Isotomidae (Collembola).

=== New genera ===
He described new genera of springtails:

- Aggressopygus Potapov et Babenko, 2014
- Antarctophorus Potapov, 1992
- Anurachorutes Kuznetsova et Potapov, 1988
- Azoritoma Greenslade et Potapov, 2008
- Caucasanura Kuznetsova et Potapov, 1988
- Chionobora Greenslade et Potapov, 2015
- Cylindropygus Deharveng, Potapov et Bedos, 2005
- Dimorphacanthella Potapov, Huang, Gao et Luan, 2010
- Dungeraphorura Gulgenova et Potapov, 2012
- Ephemerotoma Potapov, Kahrarian, Deharveng et Shayanmehr, 2015
- Ghirkanura Kuznetsova et Potapov, 1988
- Isotopenola Potapov, Babenko, Fjellberg et Greenslade, 2009
- Pauropygus Potapov, Gao et Deharveng, 2013 (family Isotomidae)
- Pseudoxenyllodes Kuznetsova et Potapov, 1988
- Sahacanthella Potapov et Stebaeva, 1995
- Secotomodes Potapov, 1988 (family Isotomidae)
- Sericeotoma Potapov, 1991
- Sibiracanthella Potapov et Stebaeva, 1995 (family Isotomidae)
- Strenzketoma Potapov, Babenko et Fjellberg, 2006

=== New species ===
From 1985 to 2024, he participated in the identification and description of over 260 new species of springtails from various regions of Russia and the world. See the list below:

List of new springtail species:
  - Friesea cubensis Potapov et Banasco, 1985
  - Secotomodes caucasicus Potapov, 1988
  - Secotomodes sibiricus Potapov, 1988
  - Caucasanura stebajevae Kuznetsova et Potapov, 1988
  - Ghirkanura chernovae Kuznetsova et Potapov, 1988
  - Anurachorutes martynovae Kuznetsova et Potapov, 1988
  - Xenyllodes (Pseudoxenyllodes) macrocanthus Kuznetsova et Potapov, 1988
  - Anurophorus stepposus Potapov et Stebaeva, 1990
  - Anurophorus alpinus Potapov et Stebaeva, 1990
  - Anurophorus chukoticus Potapov et Stebaeva, 1990
  - Anurophorus ursi Potapov et Stebaeva, 1990
  - Anurophorus orientalis Potapov et Stebaeva, 1990
  - Sericeotoma knissi Potapov, 1991
  - Parisotoma longa (Potapov, 1991)
  - Parisotoma reducta amurica (Potapov, 1991)
  - Parisotoma atroculata (Potapov, 1991)
  - Parisotoma appressopilosa (Potapov, 1991)
  - Marisotoma iremeli (Potapov, 1991) Syn.: Isotoma (Parisotoma) iremeli Potapov, 1991
  - Tetracanthella bescidica Potapov et Kaprus, 1993
  - Tetracanthella osetica Potapov et Kuchiev, 1993
  - Tetracanthella tarbae Potapov et Kuchiev, 1993
  - Tetracanthella hatipari Potapov et Kuchiev, 1993
  - Xenylla trisubloba Stebaeva et Potapov, 1994
  - Xenylla osetica Stebaeva et Potapov, 1994
  - Xenylla myrmecophila Stebaeva et Potapov, 1994
  - Xenylla continentalis Stebaeva et Potapov, 1994
  - Xenylla piceeta Stebaeva et Potapov, 1994
  - Xenylla babenkoi Stebaeva et Potapov, 1994
  - Xenylla subacauda Stebaeva et Potapov, 1994
  - Willemia trisphaerae Potapov, 1994
  - Willemia fjellbergi Potapov, 1994
  - Anurophorus eximius Potapov, 1997
  - Anurophorus koreanus Potapov, 1994
  - Anurophorus sensibilis Potapov, 1994
  - Anurophorus trisensillus Potapov, 1994
  - Anurophorus sorosi Potapov, 1994
  - Anurophorus szeptyckii Potapov, 1994
  - Anurophorus cinereus Potapov, 1994
  - Anurophorus pacificus Potapov, 1994
  - Anurophorus fjellbergi Potapov, 1994
  - Anurophorus nitrophilus Potapov, 1994
  - Anurophorus palearcticus Potapov, 1994
  - Anurophorus olympicus Potapov, 1994
  - Pseudanurophorus mobilis Potapov, 1997
  - Sibiracanthella nuda Potapov et Stebaeva, 1993
  - Sibiracanthella sohondo Potapov et Stebaeva, 1993
  - Sahacanthella kele Potapov et Stebaeva, 1993
  - Tetracanthella martynovae Potapov, 1997
  - Tetracanthella juneaui Potapov, 1997
  - Tetracanthella antoni Potapov, 1997
  - Tetracanthella deharvengi Potapov, 1997
  - Tetracanthella monguna Potapov, 1997
  - Folsomia heterocellata Stebaeva et Potapov, 1997
  - Folsomia baicalica Stebaeva et Potapov, 1997
  - Folsomia taigicola Stebaeva et Potapov, 1997
  - Folsomia sparsosetosa Potapov et Stebaeva, 1997
  - Folsomides aridoviator Potapov et Stebaeva, 1997
  - Oligaphorura tuvinica Potapov et Stebaeva, 1997
  - Wankeliella intermedia Potapov et Stebaeva, 1997
  - Folsomia amplissima Potapov et Babenko, 2000
  - Folsomia ancestor Potapov et Babenko, 2000
  - Folsomia atropolaris Potapov et Babenko, 2000
  - Folsomia borealis Potapov et Babenko, 2000
  - Folsomia brevisensilla Potapov et Babenko, 2000
  - Folsomia cryptophila Potapov et Babenko, 2000
  - Folsomia longidens Potapov et Babenko, 2000
  - Folsomia palaearctica Potapov et Babenko, 2000
  - Folsomia obscurocellata Potapov et Cassagnau, 2000
  - Folsomia riozoyoshii Potapov et Cassagnau, 2000
  - Folsomia setifrontalis Potapov et Marusik, 2000
  - Folsomia villosa Potapov et Marusik, 2000
  - Folsomia albens Kaprus et Potapov, 1999
  - Cryptopygus bibasiosetis Potapov et Stebaeva, 1999
  - Cryptopygus tribasiosetis Potapov et Stebaeva, 1999
  - Folsomia continentalis Potapov et Dunger, 2000
  - Folsomia rossica Potapov et Dunger, 2000
  - Folsomia kurushica Potapov, Abdurachmanov et Aitekova, 2001
  - Folsomia abrupta Potapov et Deharveng, 2000
  - Isotomodella psammophila Potapov et Stebaeva, 2002
  - Isotomodella microlobata Potapov et Dunger, 2000
  - Folsomia wellingdae Potapov et Culik, 2002
  - Isotomurus stepposus Potapov et Starostenko, 2002
  - Folsomia vasilyevi Berezina et Potapov, 2006
  - Folsomia arena Potapov, 2006
  - Folsomia baida Potapov, 2006
  - Folsomia bashkira Potapov, 2006
  - Folsomia torpeda Potapov, 2006
  - Folsomia paoinflata Potapov, 2006
  - Folsomia stebaevi Potapov, 2006
  - Pachyotoma thermaquatica Potapov et Lobkova in Potapov, Lobkova, Shrubovich, 2005
  - Jestella armata Potapov in Potapov, Lobkova, Shrubovich, 2005
  - Scutisotoma acorrelata Potapov, Babenko et Fjellberg, 2006)
  - Scutisotoma baica Potapov, Babenko et Fjellberg, 2006)
  - Scutisotoma dodecocellata Potapov, Babenko et Fjellberg, 2006)
  - Scutisotoma indigirka Potapov, Babenko et Fjellberg, 2006)
  - Scutisotoma karadagi Potapov, Babenko et Fjellberg, 2006)
  - Scutisotoma kolymica Potapov, Babenko et Fjellberg, 2006)
  - Scutisotoma longisensilla Potapov, Babenko et Fjellberg, 2006)
  - Scutisotoma matalini Potapov, Babenko et Fjellberg, 2006)
  - Scutisotoma millimetrica Potapov, Babenko et Fjellberg, 2006)
  - Scutisotoma montana Potapov, Babenko et Fjellberg, 2006)
  - Scutisotoma nicksmeti Potapov, Babenko et Fjellberg, 2006)
  - Scutisotoma schisti Potapov, Babenko et Fjellberg, 2006)
  - Scutisotoma stachanoremi Potapov, Babenko et Fjellberg, 2006)
  - Scutisotoma tenuidentifera Potapov, Babenko et Fjellberg, 2006)
  - Weberacantha echinodermata Potapov, Babenko et Fjellberg, 2006)
  - Weberacantha magnomucrella Potapov, Babenko et Fjellberg, 2006)
  - Folsomides crocus Potapov et Thibaud, 2003
  - Folsomides arenus Potapov et Thibaud, 2003
  - Cylindropygus ferox Deharveng, Potapov et Bedos, 2005
  - Tetracanthella corsica Potapov et Deharveng, 2005
  - Tetracanthella fusca Potapov et Deharveng, 2005
  - Tetracanthella bichaeta Potapov et Deharveng, 2005
  - Najtiaphorura dobrolubovae Shveenkova et Potapov, 2004
  - Folsomia mofettophila Schulz et Potapov, 2010
  - Tuvia liupanensis Huang, Potapov et Gao, 2009
  - Narynia luanae Huang, Potapov et Gao, 2010
  - Subisotoma pomorskii Potapov, Babenko, Fjellberg et Greenslade, 2009
  - Subisotoma multisensillata Potapov, Babenko, Fjellberg et Greenslade, 2009
  - Subisotoma posteriomollis Potapov, Babenko, Fjellberg et Greenslade, 2009
  - Subisotoma guzeriplica Potapov, Babenko, Fjellberg et Greenslade, 2009
  - Subisotoma homonomica Potapov, Babenko, Fjellberg et Greenslade, 2009
  - Subisotoma bisensillata Potapov, Babenko, Fjellberg et Greenslade, 2009
  - Subisotoma cruda Potapov, Babenko, Fjellberg et Greenslade, 2009
  - Subisotoma erratica Potapov, Babenko, Fjellberg et Greenslade, 2009
  - Subisotoma quadrisensillata Gao, Xiong et Potapov, 2009
  - Isotopenola delicata Potapov, Babenko, Fjellberg et Greenslade, 2009
  - Folsomia kuznetsovae Potapov et Taskaeva, 2009
  - Folsomia culter Potapov et Chimitova, 2009
  - Orchesella stebaevae Potapov et Kremenitsa, 2008
  - Azoritoma macquariensis Potapov et Greenslade, 2008
  - Heteroisotoma heteronomica Jie, Potapov, Sokolova, 2011
  - Heteroisotoma sinorossica Jie, Potapov, Sokolova, 2011
  - Entomobrya karasukensis Jordana, Potapov et Baquero, 2011
  - Entomobrya tuvinica Jordana, Potapov et Baquero, 2011
  - Entomobrya pseudolanuginosa Jordana, Potapov et Baquero, 2011
  - Entomobrya stebaevae Jordana, Potapov et Baquero, 2011
  - Entomobrya kuznetsovae Jordana, Potapov et Baquero, 2011
  - Entomobrya brinevi Jordana, Potapov et Baquero, 2011
  - Entomobrya primorica Jordana, Potapov et Baquero, 2011
  - Entomobrya kabardinica Jordana, Potapov et Baquero, 2011
  - Entomobrya taigicola Jordana, Potapov et Baquero, 2011
  - Entomobryoides sotoadamesi Jordana, Potapov et Baquero, 2011
  - Prodrepanura altaica Jordana, Potapov et Baquero, 2011
  - Entomobrya armeniensis Jordana, Potapov et Baquero, 2011
  - Isotomurus chaos Potapov et Babenko, 2011
  - Parisotoma sexsetosa Potapov, Janion et Deharveng, 2011
  - Parisotoma obscurocellata Potapov, Janion et Deharveng, 2011
  - Dimorphacanthella mediaseta Potapov, Bu, Huang, Gao et Luan, 2010
  - Isotomiella longisensilla Gao et Potapov, 2011
  - Isotomiella deharvengi Gao et Potapov, 2011
  - Micraphorura stojkae Shvejonkova et Potapov, 2011
  - Oligaphorura kremenitsai Shvejonkova et Potapov, 2011
  - Oligaphorura humicola Shvejonkova et Potapov, 2011
  - Isotogastrura trichaetosa Potapov, Bu et Gao, 2011
  - Scutisotoma robustodens Huang et Potapov, 2012
  - Scutisotoma trichaetosa Huang et Potapov, 2012
  - Scutisotoma bengei Huang et Potapov, 2012
  - Weberacantha cylindrica Huang et Potapov, 2012
  - Weberacantha striganovae Babenko et Potapov, 2012
  - Scutisotoma postertriplex Babenko et Potapov, 2012
  - Isotopenola perterrens Greenslade et Potapov, 2012
  - Willemia antennomonstrum Bu, Potapov et Gao, 2012
  - Willemia dhaesei Bu, Potapov et Gao, 2012
  - Folsomia postsensilis Potapov et Gao, 2012
  - Dungeraphorura yaruna Gulgenova et Potapov, 2012
  - Pauropygus pacificus Potapov, Gao et Deharveng, 2013
  - Pauropygus projectus Potapov, Gao et Deharveng, 2013
  - Folsomia biparis Potapov et Gulgenova, 2013
  - Folsomia fumosa Potapov et Gulgenova, 2013
  - Folsomia heterothorax Potapov et Gulgenova, 2013
  - Folsomia maximovi Potapov et Gulgenova, 2013
  - Folsomia pseudovtorovi Potapov et Gulgenova, 2013
  - Folsomia sensivillosa Potapov et Gulgenova, 2013
  - Folsomia uniparis Potapov et Gulgenova, 2013
  - Folsomia uniramia Potapov et Gulgenova, 2013
  - Folsomia vitimica Potapov et Gulgenova, 2013
  - Agressopygus sibiricus Potapov et Babenko, 2014
  - Agressopygus armatus Potapov et Babenko, 2014
  - Mucronia fjellbergi Potapov et Babenko, 2014
  - Protaphorura dorzhievi Gulgenova et Potapov, 2013
  - Protaphorura buryatica Gulgenova et Potapov, 2013
  - Protaphorura dzherga Gulgenova et Potapov, 2013
  - Protaphorura uniparis Gulgenova et Potapov, 2013
  - Chionobora amila Greenslade et Potapov, 2015
  - Thalassaphorura brevisetosa Sun, Gao et Potapov, 2013
  - Thalassaphorura hainanica Sun, Gao et Potapov, 2013
  - Ephemerotoma skarzynskii Potapov, Kahrarian, Deharveng et Shayanmehr, 2015
  - Vertagopus ceratus Potapov, Gulgenova et Babykina, 2016
  - Vertagopus asiaticus Potapov, Gulgenova et Babykina, 2016
  - Proisotoma dualis Potapov et Bogomolov, 2016
  - Folsomia minorae Potapov, Janion et Deharveng, 2017
  - Folsomia australica Potapov, Janion et Deharveng, 2017
  - Folsomia najtae Potapov, Fjellberg et Bokova, 2017
  - Pachyotoma miserabilis Potapov in Babenko, Potapov et Taskaeva, 2017
  - Desoria breviseta Potapov in Babenko, Potapov et Taskaeva, 2017
  - Folsomia cephalota Bu, Gao, Potapov et Huang, 2017
  - Folsomia dorsomediaseta Bu, Gao, Potapov et Huang, 2017
  - Folsomia longiseta Bu, Gao, Potapov et Huang, 2017
  - Folsomia manubriopilosa Bu, Gao, Potapov et Huang, 2017
  - Folsomia longdeica Bu, Gao, Potapov et Huang, 2017
  - Folsomia plenosensilla Bu, Gao, Potapov et Huang, 2017
  - Sahacanthella saoriae Potapov, Nakamori, Saitoh, Kuznetsova et Babenko, 2017
  - Isotomurus festus Potapov, Porco et Deharveng, 2018
  - Metisotoma bermani Potapov, Babenko, Fjellberg et Schulz, 2018
  - Metisotoma stebaevae Potapov, Babenko, Fjellberg et Schulz, 2018
  - Folsomia laconica Potapov, Hasegawa, Kuznetsova, Babenk et Kuprin, 2018
  - Folsomia trisensilla Potapov, Hasegawa, Kuznetsova, Babenk et Kuprin, 2018
  - Folsomia amurica Potapov, Hasegawa, Kuznetsova, Babenk et Kuprin, 2018
  - Folsomia imparis Potapov, Hasegawa, Kuznetsova, Babenk et Kuprin, 2018
  - Folsomia breviseta Potapov, Hasegawa, Kuznetsova, Babenk et Kuprin, 2018
  - Folsomia calcarea Potapov, Hasegawa, Kuznetsova, Babenk et Kuprin, 2018
  - Folsomia tubulata Potapov, Hasegawa, Kuznetsova, Babenk et Kuprin, 2018
  - Folsomia tertia Potapov, Hasegawa, Kuznetsova, Babenk et Kuprin, 2018
  - Tetracanthella annulata Potapov, Brinev et Sun, 2019
  - Tetracanthella tardoki Potapov, Brinev et Sun, 2019
  - Tetracanthella dorsoduplex Xie, Potapov et Sun, 2019
  - Tetracanthella wui Xie, Potapov et Sun, 2019
  - Pogonognathellus litoralis Kuprin et Potapov, 2019
  - Semicerura bryophila Potapov, Xie et Kuprin, 2020
  - Semicerura draconis Potapov, Xie et Kuprin, 2020
  - Pseudanurophorus barathrum Potapov et Gulgenova in Potapov, Huang, Gulgenova et Luan, 2020
  - Parisotoma baicalica Potapov et Gulgenova in Potapov, Huang, Gulgenova et Luan, 2020
  - Folsomia mongolica Huang et Potapov in Potapov, Huang, Gulgenova et Luan, 2020
  - Ephemerotoma buryatica Potapov, Huang et Gulgenova in Potapov, Huang, Gulgenova et Luan, 2020
  - Cryptopygus abulbus Potapovn, Janion et Deharveng, 2020
  - Cryptopygus bulbus Potapovn, Janion et Deharveng, 2020
  - Cryptopygus inflatus Potapovn, Janion et Deharveng, 2020
  - Cryptopygus longisensillus Potapovn, Janion et Deharveng, 2020
  - Cryptopygus postantennalis Potapovn, Janion et Deharveng, 2020
  - Isotominella laterochaeta Potapovn, Janion et Deharveng, 2020
  - Vertagopus persicus Potapov, Yoosefi et Shayanmehr in Lafooraki, Hajizadeh, Antipova, Kremenitsa, Shayanmehr, Potapov et Hosseini, 2020
  - Vertagopus nunataki Potapov et Kremenitsa in Lafooraki, Hajizadeh, Antipova, Kremenitsa, Shayanmehr, Potapov et Hosseini, 2020
  - Blissia robusta Fjellberg et Potapov, 1998
  - Entomobrya amurica Jordana et Baquero in Jordana et al., 2021
  - Entomobrya mediostriata Jordana et Baquero in Jordana et al., 2021
  - Entomobrya umbroviolacea ordana et Baquero in Jordana et al., 2021
  - Entomobrya bicincta Jordana et Baquero in Jordana et al., 2021
  - Willowsia babykinae Jordana et Baquero in Jordana et al., 2021
  - Entomobrya multisetis Jordana et Baquero in Jordana et al., 2021b
  - Entomobrya hirsutothorax Jordana et Baquero in Jordana et al., 2021b
  - Entomobrya kremenitsai Jordana et Baquero in Jordana et al., 2021b
  - Entomobryoides dagestanicus Jordana et Baquero in Jordana et al., 2021b
  - Anurophorus hallaensis Chang, Potapov et Park, 2021
  - Heptacanthella yinae Gao, Potapov et Bu, 2021
  - Megalothorax roseus Panina, Babenko et Potapov, 2022
  - Megalothorax processus Panina, Babenko et Potapov, 2022
  - Micranurida sectilis Babenko, Shveenkova et Potapov, 2022
  - Micranurida distincta Babenko, Shveenkova et Potapov, 2022
  - Philotella pax Babenko, Shveenkova et Potapov, 2022
  - Philotella oligotricha Babenko, Shveenkova et Potapov, 2022
  - Philotella cedrina Babenko, Shveenkova et Potapov, 2022
  - Philotella aliniensis Babenko, Shveenkova et Potapov, 2022
  - Philotella amurica Babenko, Shveenkova et Potapov, 2022
  - Philotella alba Babenko, Shveenkova et Potapov, 2022
  - Philotella pallida Babenko, Shveenkova et Potapov, 2022
  - Philotella caeca Babenko, Shveenkova et Potapov, 2022
  - Thalassaphorura transbaikalica Gulgenova et Potapov, 2023
  - Supraphorura chernovae Gulgenova et Potapov, 2023
  - Parisotoma ruseki Janion-scheepers, Potapov et Deharveng, 2023
  - Parisotoma yehlathi Janion-scheepers, Potapov et Deharveng, 2023
  - Folsomotoma amyliuae Janion-Scheepers, Potapov et Deharveng, 2023
  - Appendisotoma monomorpha Potapov in Potapov et al., 2024

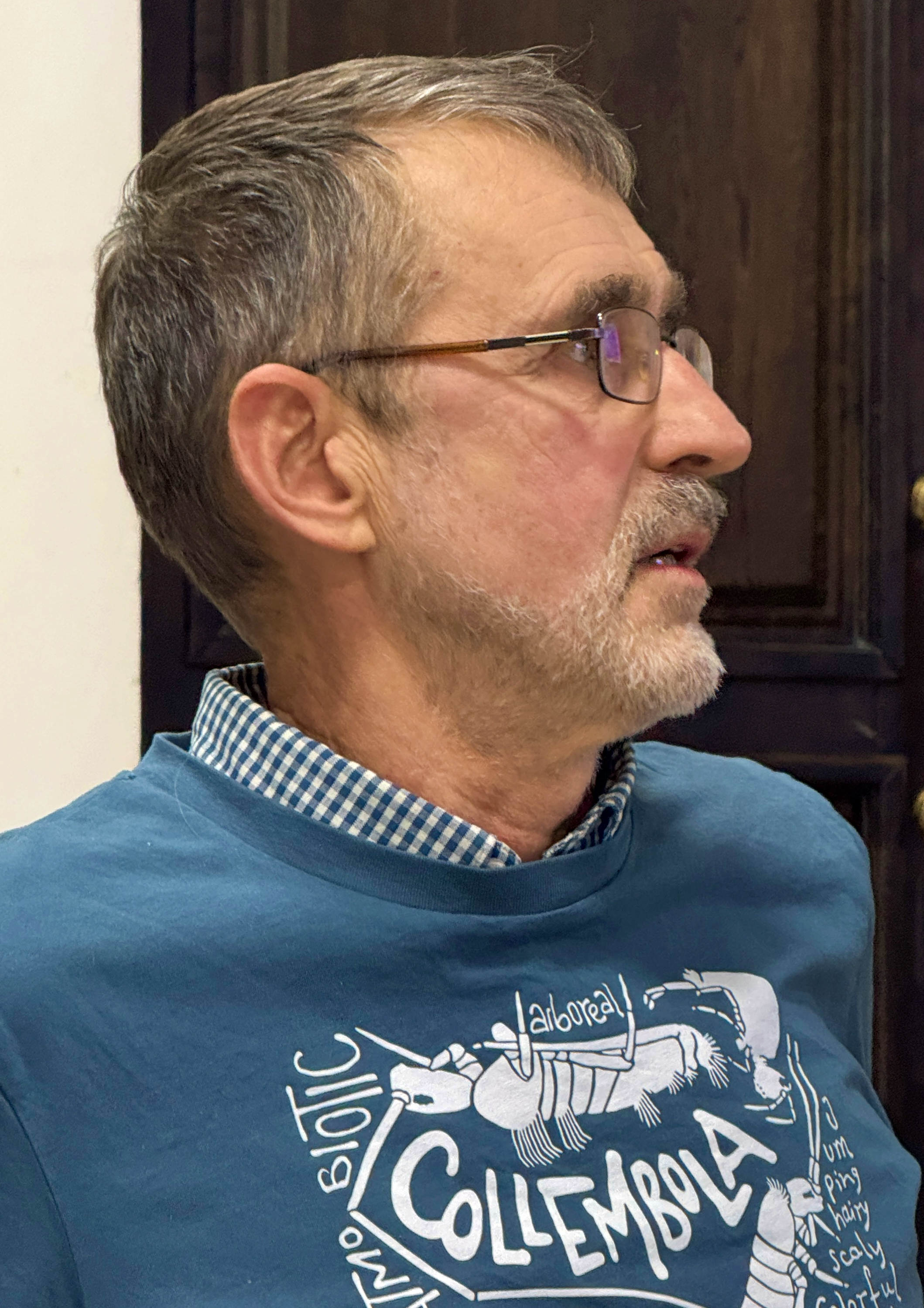
2025

== Bibliography ==
Author of more than 150 publications, among them books:

- Babenko A. B., Kuznetsova N.A., M. B. Potapov, Stebaeva S. K., Khanislamova G. M., Chernova N. M. Opredelitel' kollembol fauny SSSR: (Biologiya, ekologiya, opredelitel' semeystv i rodov) [Key to Springtails of the USSR Fauna: (Biology, Ecology, Key to Families and Genera)]. Moscow: Nauka, 1988. 214 p.
- Potapov M.B. Synopses on Palaearctic Collembola. Vol. 3. Isotomidae. 2001. 603 p. (Abhandlungen und Berichte des Naturkundemuseums Görlitz, Band 73, Heft 2, 2001)
- Potapov M. B., Kuznetsova N. A. Metody issledovaniya soobshchestv mikroartropod: posobie dlya studentov i aspirantov [Research Methods for Microarthropod Communities: A Guide for Students and Postgraduates]. Moscow: KMK, 2011, 77 p.

Encyclopedias:

- Potapov M. B. Nogokhvostki Springtails (Collembola) in the BRE.

Hirsch index in Scopus — 10; in the RSCI — 12
