= Dead Souls (1909 film) =

1909 film by Pyotr Chardynin

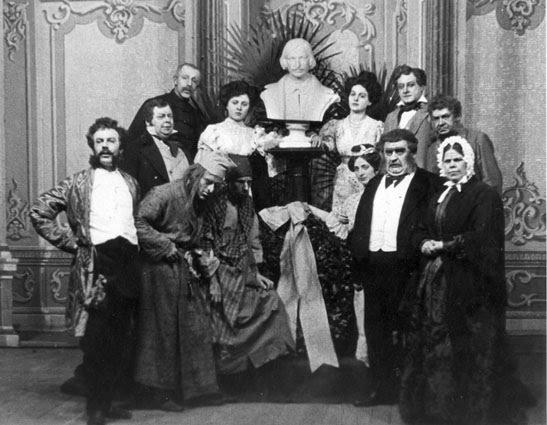
- Russian: Мёртвые души
- Directed by: Pyotr Chardynin
- Written by: Vasili Goncharov; Nikolay Gogol (novel)
- Produced by: Aleksandr Khanzhonkov
- Starring: Ivan Kamsky; Vasili Stepanov; Antonina Pozharskaya; Pyotr Chardynin; Aleksandra Goncharova; L. Khrapovitskaya; Ivan Potyomkin
- Cinematography: Vladimir Siversen
- Production company: Khanzhonkov Trading House
- Release date: 1909
- Country: Russian Empire

Dead Souls, (Russian: Мёртвые души) is a 1909 Russian short comedy directed and written by Pyotr Chardynin.

== Plot ==
The film is based on the novel "Dead Souls" by Nikolay Gogol.

== Starring ==
- Ivan Kamsky as Chichikov
- Vasili Stepanov as Sobakevich
- Antonina Pozharskaya as Plyushkin's cook
- Pyotr Chardynin as Nozdrev
- Aleksandra Goncharova as A quite simply pleasant lady
- L. Khrapovitskaya as A lady who is pleasant in all respects
- Ivan Potyomkin as Petrushka
