= The Water Nymph =

The Water Nymph may refer to:

- Water nymph
- The Water Nymph (1912 film), an American silent comedy short film
- The Water Nymph (1910 film), a Russian short film
