= The Enchanted Well =

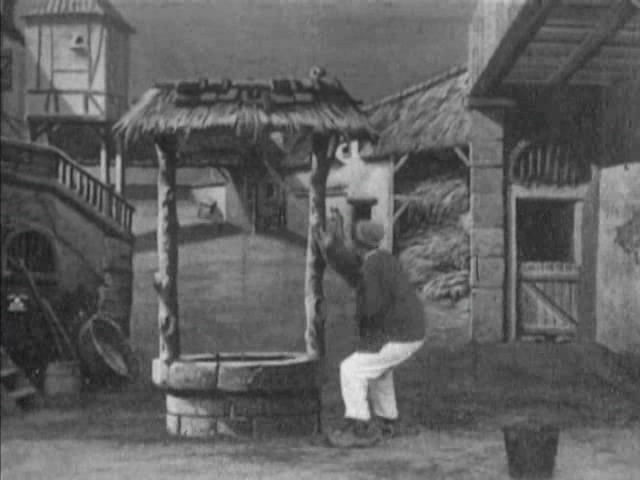
- A frame from the film
- Directed by: Georges Méliès
- Production company: Star Film Company
- Release date: 1903
- Running time: 4 minutes
- Country: France
- Language: Silent

The Enchanted Well (French: Le Puits fantastique) is a 1903 French silent trick film directed by Georges Méliès. It is a horror film about a witch and her spell on a town's well.

== Plot ==
The Enchanted Well (1903)

A witch is denied a handout and casts a spell on the town's well.

== Themes ==
The film is a comic take on traditional fairy tales, in which a well is often characterized not only as a village's central gathering place but also as a place for magical testing of characters' goodness (for example, many versions of "The Frog Prince" and "Mother Hulda" use wells this way). More specifically, the film plays with the traditional fairy tale concept of a magical woman, disguised as a beggar at a well, testing the generosity of passersby and rewarding those who pass the test. In Méliès's version of the story, however, the human characters get no magical reward; rather, the witch is sympathetic rather than wicked, and her farcical punishment of the greedy landowner is designed to be read as fully justified. Méliès returned to a similar theme in his film The Cook in Trouble (1904), in which a mistreated magical woman enchants a stove with similarly chaotic results.

== Production ==
The Enchanted Well was made in 1903, just as Méliès was reaching the high point of his career as a creator of fantasy films. Méliès himself appears in the film as the farmer with the donkey. The dragon puppet would be reused in Méliès's later films The Witch (1906) and Baron Munchausen's Dream (1911). The film's other special effects were created using stage machinery, pyrotechnics, substitution splices, and photographic dissolves on a black background. Méliès also drew freely on the gymnastic abilities of his actors, with much of the film enlivened by comedic acrobatics.

== Release and reception ==
The Enchanted Well was released by Méliès's Star Film Company and is numbered 462–464 in its catalogs. On 25 June 1903, it became the first of Méliès's films to be deposited at the Library of Congress for American copyright. From this film onward until his 1904 film The Mermaid, Méliès's practice was to deposit each film at the Library in the form of a paper print; he apparently followed this practice for all but about a dozen of the films he made during that time.

In his history of fairy tale films, the cultural historian Jack Zipes praised The Enchanted Well highly: "It is delightful. The actors are marvelous acrobats, and the puppets are goofy. … The Enchanted Well shows Méliès at his best as an original writer and designer of his own 'ridiculous' fairy tales that have deep roots in folklore." Kemp R. Niver, in his comprehensive study of the Library of Congress Paper Prints, agreed: "This film represents [Méliès's] usual excellent work."
