= The Queen of Spades (1910 film) =

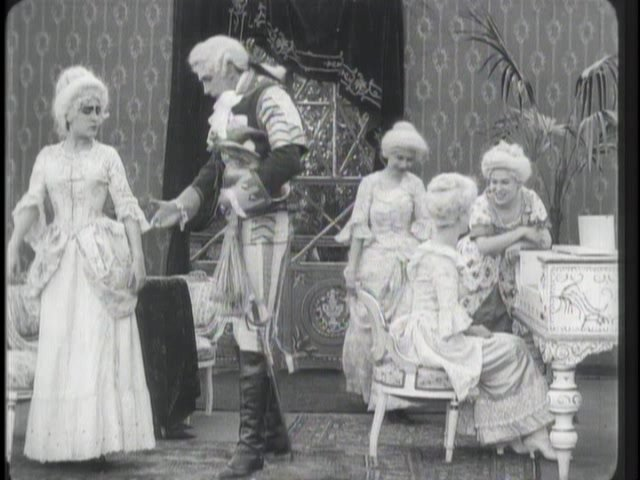
- Russian: Пиковая дама
- Directed by: Pyotr Chardynin
- Written by: Pyotr Chardynin; Alexander Pushkin
- Starring: Pavel Biryukov; Aleksandra Goncharova; Antonina Pozharskaya; Andrey Gromov
- Cinematography: Louis Forestier
- Release date: 1910
- Country: Russian Empire

Full movie.

The Queen of Spades, (Russian: Пиковая дама) is a 1910 Russian short film directed by Pyotr Chardynin.

== Plot ==
The film is based on the 1834 short story "The Queen of Spades" by Alexander Pushkin.

== Starring ==
- Pavel Biryukov as Germann (as P. Biryukov)
- Aleksandra Goncharova as Liza
- Antonina Pozharskaya as Countess (as A. Pozharskaya)
- Andrey Gromov as Tomskiy
