= The Mermaid (1904 film) =

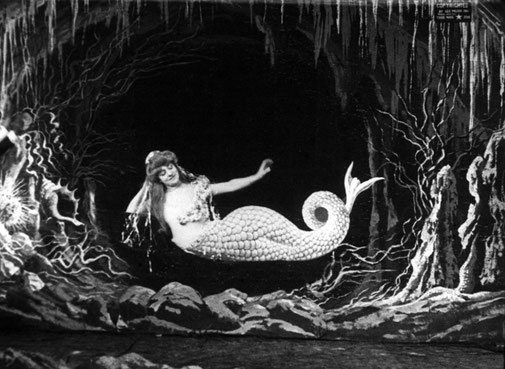
- A frame from the film
- Directed by: Georges Méliès
- Starring: Georges Méliès
- Production company: Star Film Company
- Release date: 1904
- Country: France
- Language: Silent

The Mermaid (1904)

The Mermaid (French: La Sirène) is a 1904 French silent trick film by Georges Méliès. It was sold by Méliès's Star Film Company and is numbered 593–595 in its catalogues.

Méliès himself plays the gentleman in the film. The special effects include stage machinery, pyrotechnics, substitution splices, multiple exposures, dissolves, and what reads as a traveling shot (though in fact it is the action wheeling toward the camera, not the reverse). Film critic William B. Parrill suspects this film's visuals influenced Vasili Goncharov's The Water Nymph (1910).
