= Vanka the Steward =

- Russian: Ванька-ключник
- Directed by: Vasili Goncharov
- Written by: Vasili Goncharov
- Produced by: Aleksandr Khanzhonkov
- Starring: Vasili Stepanov; Lyubov Varyagina; Andrey Gromov; Aleksandra Goncharova
- Cinematography: Vladimir Siversen
- Production company: Khanzhonkov Trading House
- Release date: 1909
- Country: Russian Empire

Vanka the Steward (Russian: Ванька-ключник, romanized: Vanka-klyuchnik) is a 1909 Russian silent black-and-white short romantic drama film directed by Vasili Goncharov, based on Russian folk song "Vanka the Steward".

== Plot ==
The Russian trade journal Cine-Phono, 1909, no. 22, p. 14, (public domain) presents the plot as follows:

Who doesn't know, who hasn't heard our Russian song, full of mournful poetry, about "Vanka the Steward"? The evil home wrecker... Both poets and artists have been inspired by this song many times, finding rich material for their creations...

Having settled on the same plot for our first film this season, we intended to depict on the screen a poetic illustration of this most popular of folk songs, transporting the viewer to the atmosphere of our native antiquity...

Scene One. An old knyaz and his boyar friend have had a few drinks and decide to go to the ferry to enjoy the dancing of the beautiful Nastya and the acting of her dashing brother, Shchegol. The knyaz orders the steward to call his young wife to say goodbye to him and, by the way, boast to the guest of her gentle disposition and submissiveness. He forces her to kiss the guest, and would gladly refuse, but, knowing her husband's fierce nature, she timidly obeys her master's orders and reluctantly kisses the tipsy boyar. And, as luck would have it, the steward is standing there too. The knyaz departed, the boyar departed, the steward paused for a moment to throw a kind word to the princess, and her heart fluttered—had the old nurse overheard the careless word, but she had no idea what was happening to the princess.

Scene Two. The housemaids and hay maids dance in a circle... A boyar staggers down and flirts with the young women, but the knyaz winces: "It's not appropriate at home, it's a different matter in the open air..." And he leads the boyar away. Not only knyaz's wive (knyaginya) has fallen in love with the young steward... The housemaid Dasha dotes on him... Like a shadow, she breaks away from the circle to exchange at least a word with Ivan, but he no longer has kind words for her... The knyaginya stands in her way, and with her own eyes she sees... how the knyaginya clings to Vanya:

Like a shirt to the shoulder,
She kissed, caressed,
called him her darling...

Anger and resentment began to speak in Dashutka’s heart, and she decided to take a desperate step: to report everything to the knyaz…

Scene Three. The prince is merrily feasting at the ferry, unaware that disaster is already upon him... Tired, exhausted, barely catching her breath, Dashutka appears and tells the knyaz the terrible truth... The knyaz roars like a wounded man and rushes home with his servants. But the nimble Nastya quickly realizes that the steward is in trouble and sends her brother by boat, taking the shortest route, to inform him of the impending disaster...

Scene Four. A swift boat flies by, Shchegol leaps out, and, driven by the desire to rescue his friend from trouble, he runs headlong toward the knyaz's tower... Before he can warn his friend of the danger, the knyaz and his servants appear at the gates... They surround him from all sides, twisting his white arms:

And they lead Vanyusha into the yard,
The wind beats Vanya’s curls,
The wind clings to his silk shirt
to his white body…

Alarmed, the knyaginya runs from the tower and, seeing her friend tied to a tree, she could not hold back a groan... This was all the knyaz needed:

Answer then, you son of the enemy,
Tell me, my barbarian,
How you walked in the knyaz's grove
With our knyaz's wife...

And the knife sank to the hilt into Ivan's chest... The princess collapsed to the ground as if mown down... Dashutka arrived in time and, groaning, wrapped herself around the corpse of Vanka the key-keeper, the evil homewrecker, whom she had destroyed...

== Cast ==
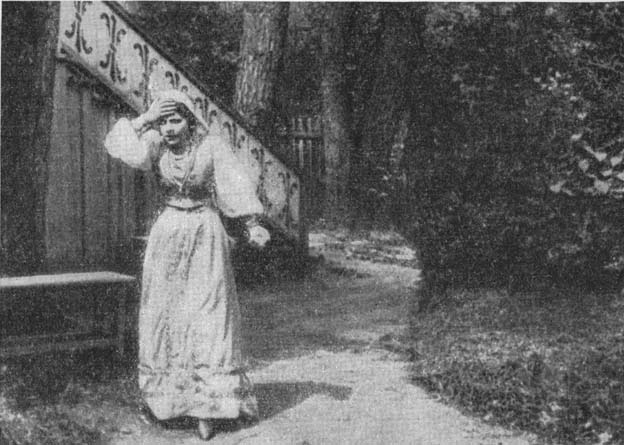
Aleksandra Goncharova in the film

- Vasily Stepanov as knyaz
- Lyubov Varyagina as knyaz's wife
- Andrey Gromov as Vanka
- Aleksandra Goncharova as housemaid

== Reception ==
Cine-Phono published a favorable review.
