= Vasily Stepanov =

Vasily Stepanov may refer to:

- Vasily Stepanov (actor), Russian film actor
- Vasily Stepanov (critic), Russian cinema critic and journalist
