= Romance with a Double Bass (disambiguation) =

Romance with a Double Bass is a 1974 British short film directed by Robert Young based on a short story by Anton Chekhov.

Romance with a Double Bass may also refer to:

- Romance with Double-Bass, a 1886 short comedy story by Anton Chekhov
- Romance with Double-Bass (1911 film), a 1911 Russian short film directed by Kai Hanson based on the Chekhov story
