= Drama in Moscow =

- Russian: Драма в Москве
- Directed by: Vasili Goncharov
- Written by: Vasili Goncharov
- Produced by: Pavel Thiman
- Starring: Pyotr Chardynin; Aleksandra Goncharova
- Cinematography: Antonio Serrano
- Music by: Pavel Shevchenko
- Release date: 1909
- Country: Russian Empire

Drama in Moscow, (Russian: Драма в Москве, romanized: Drama v Moskve) is a 1909 Russian short drama directed and written by Vasili Goncharov.

== Plot ==
The film tells about the actress, who is given a telegraph from which she learns that she can get one hundred thousand rubles, because she won the process. After that, she, along with a fan walking around Moscow, visit various restaurants. While walking in the park, a fan tries to kiss the actress, but she does not allow him to do this, as a result of which the fan shoots at her and then - into herself.

== Starring ==
- Pyotr Chardynin
- Aleksandra Goncharova
