= Chrysanthemums (film) =

1914 short film directed by Pyotr Chardynin

- Russian: Хризантемы
- Directed by: Pyotr Chardynin
- Written by: Yevgeni Bauer
- Produced by: Aleksandr Khanzhonkov
- Starring: Vera Karalli; Ivan Mozzhukhin; Raisa Reyzen; Sofya Goslavskaya; Lidiya Tridenskaya; Aleksandr Kheruvimov
- Production company: Khanzhonkov Trading House
- Release date: 1914
- Country: Russian Empire

Chrysanthemums (Russian: Хризантемы) is a 1914 short film directed by Pyotr Chardynin.

== Plot ==
Chrysanthemums (1914)

The film tells about the ballerina Vera Nevolina, the enamored big debtor Vladimir. Vera wants to help Vladimir repay his debts and offers him her jewels, but Vladimir starts courting a young and rich widow in the hope that she will marry him and he will pay off with all his debts.

== Starring ==
- Vera Karalli as Vera Alekseevna Nevolina, the dancer
- Ivan Mozzhukhin as Vladimir
- Raisa Reyzen as Widow (as R. Reisen)
- Sofya Goslavskaya (as S. Goslavskaya)
- Lidiya Tridenskaya
- Aleksandr Kheruvimov as Administrator of the theatre

== Remake ==
In 2009 an amateur remake of the film was made — a picture "Pietà" (film studio "Decadence", St. Petersburg)
