= Nina Chernova =

Nina Chernova (fl. 1913) was a Russian Empire silent film actress. She acted the role of Vera Dubrokskaia, the heroine in Yevgeni Bauer's Twilight of a Woman's Soul (1913), making her "the first professional female performer in Russian film".
