= Mariya Khalatova =

Russian actress

- Born: Mariya Khalatova
- Occupation: actress
- Years active: 1914–1918

Mariya Khalatova (Russian: Мария Халатова) was a Russian film actress. Honored Artist of the RSFSR.

== Selected filmography ==
- 1914 — Gospodin director flirtuyet
- 1915 — Leon Drey
- 1915 — After Death (1915 film)
