= Sofya Goslavskaya =

Russian actress

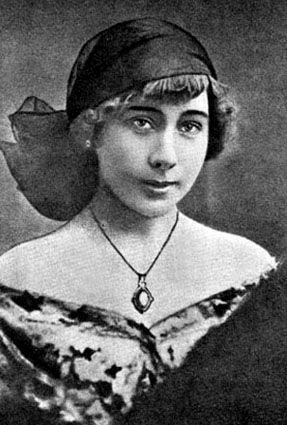
- Sofya Goslavskaya in 1915
- Born: Sofya Goslavskaya; 1890
- Died: 1979 (aged 88–89)
- Occupation: actress
- Years active: 1913–1915
- Parent: Evgeny Goslavsky

Sofya Goslavskaya (Russian: Софья Гославская, 1890—1979) was a Russian theater and film actress.

== Selected filmography ==
- 1913 — The Accession of the House of Romanovs
- 1913 — The Little House in Kolomna
- 1914 — Ruslan and Ludmila
- 1914 — Volga and Siberia
- 1914 — Chrysanthemums (film)
