= For Happiness =

1917 film directed by Yevgeni Bauer

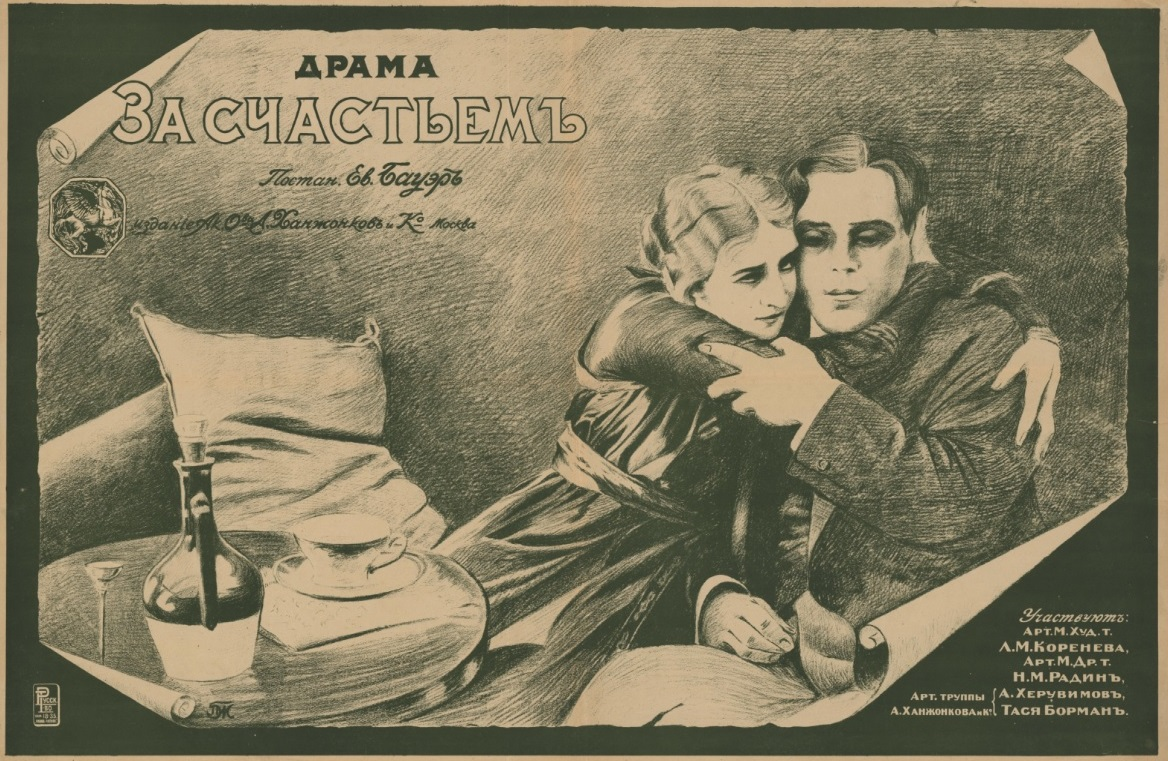
- Russian: За счастьем
- Directed by: Yevgeny Bauer
- Written by: N. Dennitsyna
- Starring: Emma Bauer; Tasya Borman; N. Dennitsyna; Aleksandr Kheruvimov; Lidiya Koreneva
- Cinematography: Boris Zavelev
- Release date: 1917
- Country: Russian Empire
- Language: Russian

For Happiness (Russian: За счастьем) is a 1917 Russian short drama film directed by Yevgeny Bauer.

== Plot ==
For Happiness (1917)

Zoya Verenskaya and Dmitry Gzhatsky have been loving each other for 10 years, but Zoya does not want to harm the psyche of her daughter Lee, therefore, lovers are still not together. One day, Zoya goes with her daughter to the resort and there she learns that her daughter also loves Dmitry...

== Cast ==
- Emma Bauer as The girl
- Tasya Borman as Lee, her daughter
- N. Dennitsyna as Lee's nurse
- Aleksandr Kheruvimov as Doctor
- Lidiya Koreneva as Zoya Verenskaya, rich widow
- Lev Kuleshov as Enrico, painter
- Nikolai Radin as Dmitry, a lawyer
