= Vasily Stepanov (actor) =

- Born: Vasily Stepanov
- Occupation: Actor
- Years active: 1908–1918

Vasily Stepanov (Russian: Василий Степанов) was a Russian film actor.

== Selected filmography ==
- 1909 — 16th Century Russian Wedding
- 1910 — The Water Nymph
- 1912 — The Bandit Brothers
