= The Dying Swan (film) =

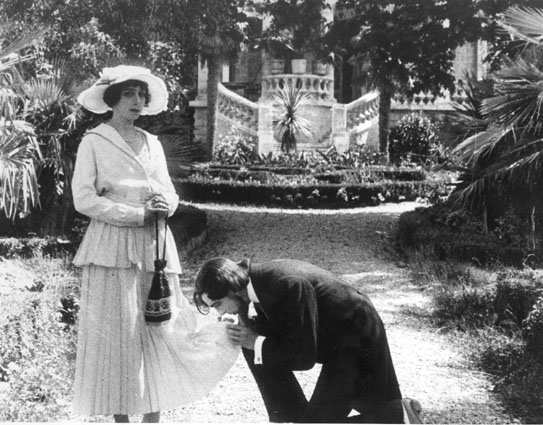
- Russian: Умирающий лебедь
- Directed by: Yevgeni Bauer
- Written by: Zoya Barantsevich
- Produced by: Aleksandr Khanzhonkov
- Starring: Vera Karalli; Aleksandr Kheruvimov; Vitold Polonsky; Andrej Gromov; Ivane Perestiani
- Cinematography: Boris Zavelev
- Production company: A. Khanzhonkov and Co.
- Release date: 17 January 1917
- Running time: 49 minutes
- Country: Russian Empire

The Dying Swan (Russian: Умирающий лебедь) is a 1917 gothic drama film directed by Yevgeni Bauer and starring Vera Karalli, Aleksandr Kheruvimov, Vitold Polonsky, Andrej Gromov, and Ivane Perestiani.

== Plot ==
The Dying Swan (1917)

Vera Karalli plays Gizella, a melancholy young woman who cannot speak, but is a gifted ballet dancer. A young man becomes interested in her beauty, but loses interest for another woman. She cannot take this disappointment and appeals to her father (through writing) to get her out of their town, because she will surely die if forced to remain in her current circumstances. Her father fights for a theatre company to give her a trial despite her handicap, and she is reluctantly accepted.

Gizella becomes a sensation, her performances in the ballet of The Dying Swan earning her widespread attention and fame. Count Valeriy Glinskiy, a man with an unrelenting fixation on death, is entranced. Ecstatic at finally finding a muse for his idée fixe, he begs her to let him paint her in the moment of the swan's death, to capture that feeling of perfect peace forever.

== Cast ==
- Vera Karalli as Gizella — Gizella — mute dancer
- Aleksandr Kheruvimov as Gizella's Father
- Vitold Polonsky as Viktor Krasovsky
- Andrej Gromov as Valeriy Glinskiy — the artist
- Ivane Perestiani as Glinskiy's friend
