= Vera Karalli =

Russian ballet dancer and actor (1889–1972)

- Вера Каралли
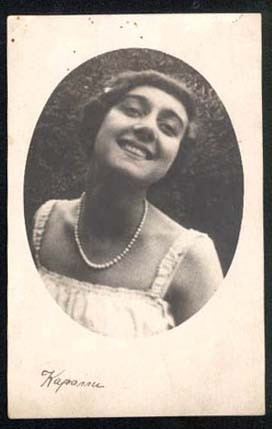
- Karalli c. 1910–1915
- Born: Vera Alexeyevna Karalli; 27 July 1889; Moscow, Russia
- Died: 16 November 1972 (aged 83); Baden, Austria
- Occupations: Ballet dancer; choreographer; silent film actress
- Years active: 1914–1921

Vera Alexeyevna Karalli (Russian: Вера Алексеевна Каралли; 8 August [O.S. 27 July] 1889 – 16 November 1972) was a Russian ballet dancer, choreographer and silent film actress during the early years of the 20th century.

== Early life and career ==
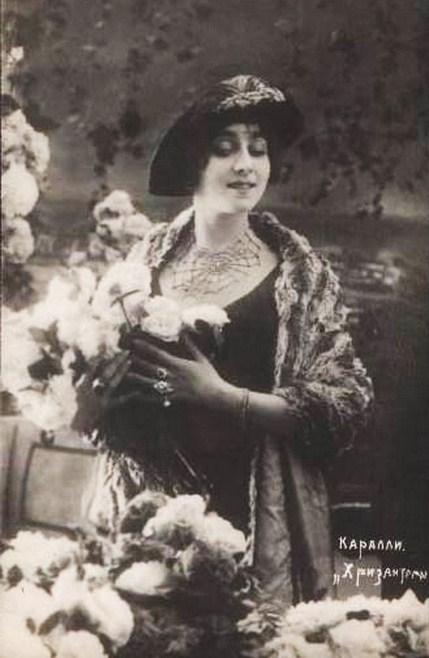
Vera Karalli in Krizantemy (1914)

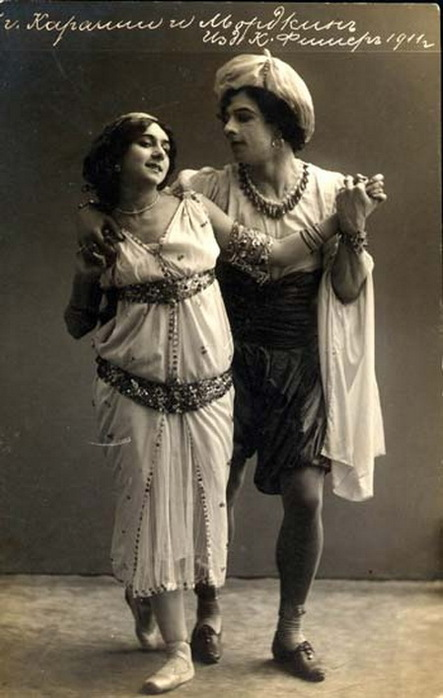
Postcard 1910s, with Mikhail Mordkin

Born in Moscow on 8 August 1889, Karalli graduated from the Moscow Theatre School in 1906 under the direction of the prominent Russian instructor Alexander Gorsky. Karalli performed with Sergei Diaghilev's Ballets Russes company in 1909, as well as 1919 and 1920. She became a soloist at the Bolshoi Theatre after two years and became a ballerina in 1915. Karalli was frequently paired with danseur Mikhail Mordkin.

In 1914, Karalli also embarked on a successful acting career, and became one of Russia's first celebrated film actresses. Her first role was in the 1914 Pyotr Chardynin directed drama Ty pomnish' li? (English title: Do You Remember?) opposite the successful actor Ivan Mozzhukhin. From 1914 to 1919, Vera Karalli would appear in approximately sixteen Russian silent films, including the 1915 adaptation of Leo Tolstoy's War and Peace titled Voyna i mir. Her last film appearance was in a German dramatic release entitled Die Rache einer Frau (English title: A Woman's Revenge) in 1921. Often chosen as a leading lady by the notable director Yevgeni Bauer, Karalli is possibly best recalled for her performances in the Bauer directed adaptations of novelist Ivan Turgenev's Posle smerti (English: After Death) in 1915 and her role as Gizella in the 1917 melodrama Umirayushchii Lebed (The Dying Swan).

== Rasputin's death ==
Karalli was a mistress of Grand Duke Dmitri Pavlovich of Russia and was reportedly also a co-conspirator in the December 1916 murder of Grigori Rasputin. She was allegedly one of two women present in the palace of Felix Yussupov on the night of Rasputin's murder. The other was Marianne Pistohlkors. Their alleged male co-conspirators never publicly identified the two women.

== Exile ==
After fleeing to the West following the October Revolution, Karalli made her final film appearance in the 1921 Robert Wiene-directed German silent drama Die Rache einer Frau opposite Olga Engl and Franz Egenieff, credited as "Vera Caroly".

In 1920, Karalli participated in a large charity concert at the Paris Opéra along with opera singer and dancer Maria Nikolaevna Kuznetsova amongst others, to raise funds to aid impoverished fellow Russian émigrés.

In the 1920s, Vera Karalli taught dance in Kaunas, Lithuania and from 1930 until 1935 she was the ballet mistress of the Romanian Opera in the capital city of Bucharest. From 1938 until 1941 Karalli lived in Paris, France. Later, she settled in Vienna, Austria and taught ballet there. Karalli died in Baden, Austria on 16 November 1972. She was interred at the Vienna Central Cemetery.

== Filmography ==
- Ты помнишь ли? (Ty pomnish' li?) (1914)
- Сорванец (Sorvanets) (1914)
- Chrysanthemums (1914)
- After Death (1915)
- War and Peace (1915)
- Наташа Ростова (Natasha Rostova) (1915)
- Тени греха (Teni grekha) (1915)
- Обожжённые крылья (Obozhzhenniye krylya) (1915)
- Любовь статского советника (Lyubov statskogo sovetnika) (1915)
- Счастье вечной ночи (Schastye vechnoy nochi) (1915)
- Драконовский контракт (Drakonovskiy kontrakt) (1915)
- Гриф старого борца (Grif starogo bortsa) (1916)
- The King of Paris (1917)
- The Dying Swan (1917)
- Набат (Nabat) (1917)
- Мечта и жизнь (Mechta i zhizn) (1918)
- La Nuit du 11 septembre (1919)
- A Woman's Revenge (1921)

== See also ==
- List of Russian ballet dancers

== Sources ==
- Craine, Debra; Mackrell, Judith (1 January 2010). "Karalli, Vera". The Oxford Dictionary of Dance. Oxford University Press. ISBN 978-0-19-956344-9.
