= Raisa Reyzen =

Russian actress (1888–1956)

- Born: Raisa Reyzen; 1888
- Died: 1956 (aged 67–68)
- Occupation: actress
- Years active: 1909–1915

Raisa Reyzen (Russian: Раиса Рейзен; 1888–1956) was a Russian film actress.

== Selected filmography ==
- 1909 — Mazeppa
- 1914 — Chrysanthemums
- 1915 — Leon Drey
