= Mazeppa (1909 film) =

1909 film

- Russian: Мазепа
- Directed by: Vasili Goncharov
- Written by: Vasili Goncharov; Alexander Pushkin
- Produced by: Aleksandr Khanzhonkov
- Starring: Vasili Stepanov; Andrey Gromov; Raisa Reyzen; Antonina Pozharskaya
- Cinematography: Vladimir Siversen
- Release date: 1909
- Country: Russian Empire
- Language: Russian

Mazeppa (Russian: Мазепа, romanized: Mazepa) is a 1909 Russian drama film directed by Vasili Goncharov.

== Plot ==
Mazeppa (1909)

The film tells about the Hetman named Mazepa, who is in love with Kochubey's daughter, Maria, and asks her father for consent to marry her, but his father refuses him. This does not stop them and they run away...

== Cast ==
- Vasili Stepanov as Kochubey
- Andrey Gromov as Mazepa
- Raisa Reyzen as Maria
- Antonina Pozharskaya as Maria's mother
