= Lyubov Varyagina =

Russian actress

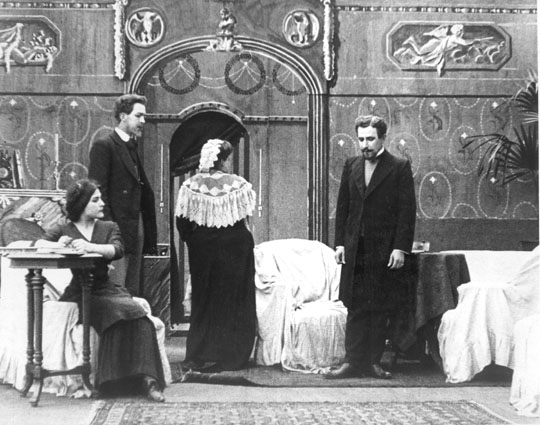
- Born: Lyubov Varyagina
- Occupation: actress
- Years active: 1906–1911

Lyubov Varyagina (Russian: Любовь Варягина) was a Russian film actress.

== Selected filmography ==
- 1909 — Vanka the Steward
- 1909 — The Enchantress
- 1910 — The Idot
- 1911 — Eugene Onegin
- 1911 — At a Lively Spot
