= Daydreams (1915 film) =

- Directed by: Yevgeni Bauer
- Written by: M. Basov
- Produced by: Aleksandr Khanzhonkov
- Cinematography: Boris Zavelev
- Production company: Khanzhonkov Trading House
- Release date: 1915
- Running time: 37 minutes
- Country: Russian Empire
- Languages: Silent film with Russian intertitles

Daydreams (Грёзы) is a 1915 Russian silent film directed by Yevgeni Bauer.

== Plot ==
Daydreams (1915)

Sergei is devastated by the death of his beloved wife Yelena. He becomes more and more obsessed by her and more and more often sees visions of her ghost. He starts an affair with an actress who looks like his dead wife but progressively drifts into madness with dramatic consequences.

== Production ==
Daydreams was produced by A. Khanzhonkov and Co. the company created by Aleksandr Khanzhonkov, Russia's first cinema entrepreneur.

== Film crew ==
Director: Evgeny Bauer

Scriptwriters: M. Basov and Valentin Turkin

Cameraman: Boris Zavelev

Producer: Alexander Khanzhonkov

== Cast ==
- Alexandr Vyrubov as Sergei Nikolaevich Nedelin
- F. Werchowzewa as Yelena, his wife
- Viktor Arens as Solski, a painter
- N. Chernobajewa as Tina Wlarskaja, an actress
