= Romance with Double-Bass (1911 film) =

- Directed by: Kai Hanson
- Written by: Cheslav Sabinsky
- Based on: Romance with Double-Bass by Anton Chekhov
- Starring: Vera Gorskaya; Nikolai Vasilyev
- Cinematography: Joseph-Louis Mundwiller
- Production company: Pathé
- Release date: 1911
- Running time: 8 min.
- Country: Russian Empire
- Language: Russian

Romance with Double-Bass is a Russian silent comedy short film released in 1911. Directed by Kai Hanson, it is based on the 1886 short story of the same name by the Russian writer Anton Chekhov. The film was released seven years after his death, the time Chekhov thought people would stop reading his work.

This is the second film adaptation of Chekhov's writings and the first that has been preserved — the 1909 adaptation of Surgery by Pyotr Chardynin is considered to be lost.

== Cast ==
- Nikolai Vasilyev as a musician
- Vera Gorskaya as knyazna Bibulova

== Critical reception ==
The reviewer of the Sine-Phono journal № 2 (1911) called it "a movie with wonderful acting and amazingly clear and juicy photography and beautiful locations where the action takes place". He wrote that the filmmakers had shown all respect that Anton Chekhov's name deserved.
