= Defence of Sevastopol =

- Directed by: Aleksandr Khanzhonkov; Vasily Goncharov
- Written by: Aleksandr Khanzhonkov; Vasily Goncharov
- Produced by: Aleksandr Khanzhonkov
- Starring: Ivan Mozzhukhin; Andrey Gromov; Vladimir Maksimov
- Cinematography: Louis Forestier; Aleksandr Ryllo
- Music by: Georgiy Kozachenko
- Release date: 26 October 1911
- Running time: 100 minutes
- Country: Russian Empire
- Languages: Silent film Russian intertitles
- Budget: 40,000 rubles

Defence of Sevastopol

Defence of Sevastopol (Russian: Оборона Севастополя, or Воскресший Севастополь) is a 1911 historical war film about the Siege of Sevastopol during the Crimean War and one of the most important films in the history of Russian cinema and cinema in general. It was the first feature film made in the Russian Empire and it premiered on 26 October at the Livadia Palace of Tsar Nicolas II. It was also the first film in the world recorded using two cameras. The film was also notable for using special "sound effects" (gun and cannon fire) and for using the actual war veterans as consultants.

== Film crew ==
- Directors and writers: Vasily Goncharov and Aleksandr Khanzhonkov
- Cinematographers: Louis Forestier and Aleksandr Ryllo
- Artist: V. Fester
- Composer: Georgiy Kozachenko
- Consultant: Polkovnik M. Lyakhov

== Cast ==
- A. Bibikov — graf Eduard Totleben
- Pavel Biryukov
- B. Borisov
- Aleksandra Goncharova
- Borus Gorin-Goryainov
- Andrey Gromov — admiral Pavel Nakhimov
- Vladimir Maksimov
- Ivan Mozzhukhin — admiral Vladimir Kornilov
- Olga Petrova-Zvantseva — merchant (sutler)
- N. Semyonov — sailor Koshka
