= Boyarin Orsha (film) =

1909 Russian drama film

- Russian: Боярин Орша
- Directed by: Pyotr Chardynin
- Written by: Pyotr Chardynin
- Produced by: Aleksandr Khanzhonkov
- Starring: Andrey Gromov; Pyotr Chardynin; Aleksandra Goncharova
- Cinematography: Vladimir Siversen
- Release date: 1909
- Country: Russian Empire
- Language: Russian

Boyarin Orsha (Russian: Боярин Орша) is a 1909 Russian action drama film directed by Pyotr Chardynin. It is based on the poem with the same name by Mikhail Lermontov.

== Plot ==
Boyarin Orsha (1909)

The film tells about the boyar, returning to his native estate after the service of Ivan the Terrible. One day, he becomes a witness of his daughter’s meeting with his adopted son Arseny, which makes him furious...

== Cast ==
- Andrey Gromov as Arseniy
- Pyotr Chardynin as Orsha
- Aleksandra Goncharova as Orsha's daughter
