= Glory to Us, Death to the Enemy =

- Russian: Слава — нам, смерть — врагам
- Directed by: Yevgeni Bauer
- Written by: Yevgeni Bauer
- Produced by: Aleksandr Khanzhonkov
- Starring: Ivan Mozzhukhin; Dora Tschitorina
- Production company: Khanzhonkov Trading House
- Release date: 1914
- Country: Russian Empire

Glory to Us, Death to the Enemy (Russian: Слава — нам, смерть — врагам) is a 1914 short film directed by Yevgeni Bauer.

== Plot ==
Glory to Us, Death to the Enemy (1914)

The film tells about the sister of mercy, who, together with her fiancé, goes to war.

A military and patriotic drama set during World War I. At the beginning of the film, the secular life and engagement of the main character Olga to the officer is shown. Then the war begins, and her fiancé is drafted to the front. Olga becomes a nurse of mercy in a hospital and one day sees her beloved among the wounded. He dies in her arms, Olga vows revenge. She asks to join a reconnaissance unit and begins working in a German hospital. One day, she steals an important document and hands it over to the Russian military headquarters. At the end of the film, Olga is awarded a medal.

== Starring ==
- Ivan Mozzhukhin as Her groom, officer
- Dora Tschitorina as Charity Sister
