= Antonina Pozharskaya =

Russian actress

- Born: Antonina Pozharskaya
- Occupation: actress
- Years active: 1908–1913

Antonina Pozharskaya (Russian: Антонина Пожарская) was a Russian film actress.

== Selected filmography ==
- 1909 — Song About the Merchant Kalashnikov
- 1909 — 16th Century Russian Wedding
- 1909 — Mazeppa
- 1909 — Dead Souls
- 1910 — The Idiot
- 1910 — Queen of Spades
- 1913 — Sorrows of Sarah
