= Nikolai Radin =

Russian actor (1872–1935)

Nikolai Radin Николай Радин
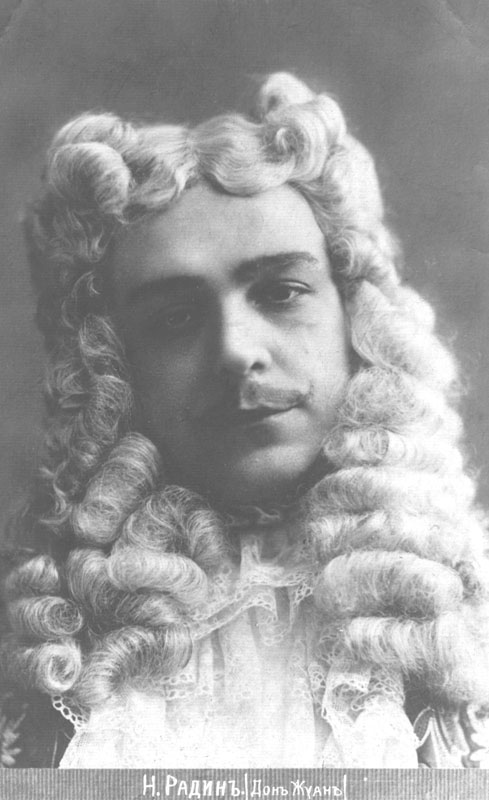
- Born: Nikolai Mariusovich Kazankov; 15 December 1872; Saint Petersburg, Russian Empire
- Died: 24 August 1935 (aged 62); Moscow, USSR
- Occupation: Actor
- Years active: 1915–1934
- Spouse(s): Natalya Lisenko (divorced); Yelena Shatrova
- Relatives: Marius Petipa (grandfather)

Nikolai Mariusovich Radin (Russian: Николай Мариусович Радин; 15 December 1872 – 24 August 1935) was a Russian stage and silent film actor and director.

== Biography ==
Radin was born as Nikolai Mariusovich Kazankov on 15 December 1872 to Marius Mariusovich Petipa, an actor, and Mariya Kazankova, a dressmaker. Nikolai was a grandson of the famous choreographer Marius Petipa. His parents never married.

Radin received his education at Faculty of Law, Saint Petersburg State University in 1900. Fascinated by the theater, he began his career as a stage actor. Gradually he became known for being a dramatic actor.

For many years, he and his second wife, actress Yelena Shatrova, worked as actors at the theater Korsch in Moscow. In 1932 the theater Korsch was closed, and they began working at the Maly Theatre.

Radin died on 24 August 1935. He was buried at Vagankovo Cemetery.

== Selected filmography ==
- Marionetki (1934) as "Re" - The Archbishop
- Myortvyy dom (1932) as L.V. Doubelt
- Predatel (1926)
- Mechta i zhizn (1918) as Valerij Radomski
- Za schastiem (short) (1917) as Dmitry, a lawyer
- Nabat (1917)
- The King of Paris (1917) as Rascol Venkov
- Teni liubvi (1917)
- Plebey (1915) as Jean
- Andrey Toboltsev (1915)
- Leon Drey (1915)
