= Arseny Bibikov =

- Born: Arseny Nikolayevich Bibikov (1873–1927)
- Occupations: Writer, actor, poet
- Years active: 1910–1918

Arseny Nikolayevich Bibikov (1873–1927) was a writer, film and stage actor, poet. Bibikov played in almost 50 films.

Bibikov was born into a wealthy noble family and spent most of his childhood at his parents’ estate in Vorgol, Lipetsk Oblast.

== Selected filmography ==
- 1910 – The Idiot
- 1914 – The Girl from the Street
- 1915 – Children of the Age
- 1916 – Mirages
- 1918 – Hero of the spirit
