= Song of Triumphant Love =

- Russian: Песнь торжествующей любви
- Directed by: Yevgeni Bauer
- Written by: Ivan Turgenev
- Starring: Vera Kholodnaya; Vitold Polonsky; Ossip Runitsch
- Release date: 1915
- Country: Russian Empire

Song of Triumphant Love (Russian: Песнь торжествующей любви) is a 1915 Russian romantic drama film directed by Yevgeni Bauer. It is based on a short story with the same name by Ivan Turgenev.

== Plot ==
The film is based on story by Ivan Turgenev.

== Starring ==
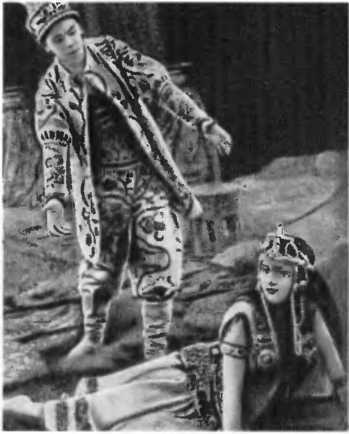
Vitold Polonsky and Vera Kholodnaya in Song of Triumphant Love

- Vera Kholodnaya
- Vitold Polonsky
- Ossip Runitsch
