= The Girl from the Street =

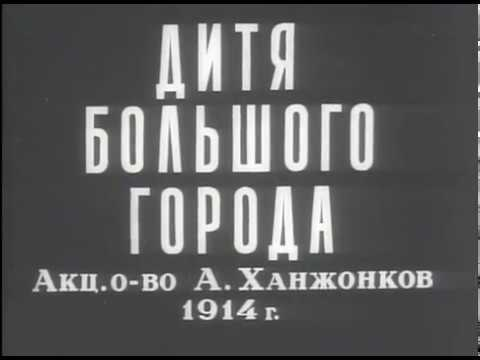
- Russian: Дитя большого города
- Directed by: Yevgeni Bauer
- Written by: Yevgeni Bauer
- Produced by: Aleksandr Khanzhonkov
- Starring: Elena P. Smirnova; Nina Kozlyaninova; Mikhail Salarov; Arseny Bibikov; Emma Bauer; Leonid Iost; Lidiya Tridenskaya
- Release date: 1914
- Country: Russian Empire

The Girl from the Street (Russian: Дитя большого города) is a 1914 short film directed by Yevgeni Bauer.

== Plot ==
The Girl from the Street (1914)

The film tells about the daughter of a poor laundress who falls in love with a rich guy, and when she throws him, he commits suicide.

== Reception ==
The film received positive reviews the year it was released. “Bulletin of Cinematography” wrote that “the picture is set above praise”. The review also noted that Elena Smirnova's performance “leaves nothing to be desired.” The “oriental dance” performed by Emma Bauer stood out in particular, the reviewer wrote about the amazing plasticity of the artist, her quivering snake-like movements, reminiscent of the expressive plasticity of the famous English dancer Miss Maud Alan.

“The only beauty of the production of Russian drama” was called the picture by the magazine “Kinema”. He also noted the game of E. Smirnova and M. Salarov and the fact that “the rest of the performers supported the general ensemble.”

In the future, critics also highly appreciated the film. In particular, film historian Veniamin Vishnevsky singled out this picture as “the most interesting film by E. F. Bauer, realistically interpreting the characters and the environment”.

Film critic Oksana Bulgakova in her book “Gesture Factory” pointed out that “Child of the Big City” repeats the plot scheme of another film by Yevgeny Bauer, “Silent Witnesses”: a girl from a low social class becomes the mistress of an aristocrat. But in Silent Witnesses, neither the position nor the sign language of the maid changes. In the film “Child of the Big City”, “the fashionista, becoming a cocotte, adopts the posture and body language attributed in “Silent Witnesses” to an aristocrat”, “the actress plays two bodies”. The author of the book also cites one of the “magic hand gestures” from the film as an illustration of the means of expression in silent films.

== Starring ==
- Elena P. Smirnova as Manetschka / Mary (as Elena Smirnova)
- Nina Kozlyaninova as Manetschka as child
- Mikhail Salarov as Viktor Krawzow
- Arseny Bibikov as Kramskoi, his friend
- Emma Bauer as The dancer
- Leonid Iost as The lackey
- Lidiya Tridenskaya as The washerwoman
