= Taras Bulba (1909 film) =

- Russian: Тарас Бульба
- Directed by: Aleksandr Drankov
- Written by: Nikolai Gogol (novel)
- Produced by: F. Reinhardt; Pavel Thiman
- Starring: Anisim Suslov; L. Manko; D. Chernovskaya
- Release date: 1909
- Country: Russian Empire

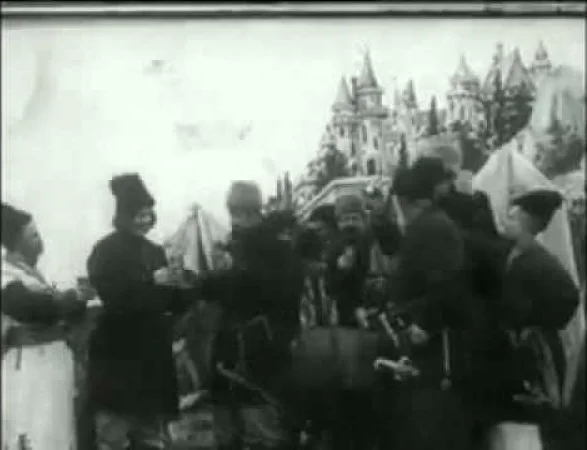
A frame from the movie "Taras Bulba".

Taras Bulba, (Russian: Тарас Бульба) is a 1909 Russian drama short film directed by Aleksandr Drankov. It was a silent film, based on the novel of the same name by Nikolai Gogol.

In 1962, a long film of the same name, based loosely on Gogol's novel, premiered.

== Starring ==
- Anisim Suslov
- L. Manko
- D. Chernovskaya
