= Pavel Biryukov =

Russian actor

- Born: Pavel Biryukov
- Occupation: Actor
- Years active: 1910–1918

Pavel Biryukov (Russian: Павел Бирюков) was a Russian film and stage actor.

== Selected filmography ==
- 1909 – 16th Century Russian Wedding
- 1910 – The Idiot
- 1910 – Queen of Spades
- 1911 – Defence of Sevastopol
