= The Portrait (1915 film) =

- Russian: Портрет
- Directed by: Ladislas Starevich
- Based on: "The Portrait" by Nikolai Gogol
- Starring: Andrey Gromov; Ivan Lazarev
- Cinematography: Vladislav Starevich
- Release date: 1915
- Country: Russian Empire
- Language: Russian

The surviving footage from The Portrait

The Portrait (Russian: Портрет, romanized: Portret) is a 1915 Russian film directed by Ladislas Starevich. Only 22 minutes of 45 minutes of the film still exist today.

== Plot ==
The film tells about a man who acquires a portrait of an old man, hangs him on a wall in his house and tries to fall asleep, but for some reason he cannot, as a result of which he decides to hang a portrait. And suddenly the old man comes out of the picture and starts to the main character...

== Cast ==
- Andrey Gromov
- Ivan Lazarev
