= The Little House in Kolomna =

- Russian: Домик в Коломне
- Directed by: Pyotr Chardynin
- Written by: Alexander Pushkin (poem)
- Starring: Praskovya Maksimova; Sofya Goslavskaya; Ivan Mozzhukhin
- Cinematography: Wladyslaw Starewicz
- Release date: 1913
- Country: Russian Empire

The Little House in Kolomna, (Russian: Домик в Коломне) is a 1913 Russian short film directed by Pyotr Chardynin.

== Plot ==
The Little House in Kolomna (1913)

The film is based on the 1830 poem The Little House in Kolomna by Alexander Pushkin.

== Starring ==
- Praskovya Maksimova
- Sofya Goslavskaya
- Ivan Mozzhukhin
