= Uncle's Apartment =

1913 film by Pyotr Chardynin

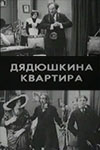
- Russian: Дядюшкина квартира
- Directed by: Pyotr Chardynin; Yevgeni Bauer
- Starring: Dora Citorena; Andrey Gromov; Aleksandr Kheruvimov; Ivan Mozzhukhin; V. Niglov; Lidiya Tridenskaya
- Release date: 1913
- Country: Russian Empire

Uncle's Apartment, (Russian: Дядюшкина квартира) is a 1913 Russian short film directed by Pyotr Chardynin and Yevgeni Bauer.

== Plot ==
Uncle's Apartment (1913)

The film will tell about a man named Koko, who decides to rent out his uncle's apartment rooms, as a result of which, in the same apartment, absolutely different people turn out to be.

== Starring ==
- Dora Citorena
- Andrey Gromov
- Aleksandr Kheruvimov
- Ivan Mozzhukhin as Coco
- V. Niglov
- Lidiya Tridenskaya
