= The 1002nd Ruse =

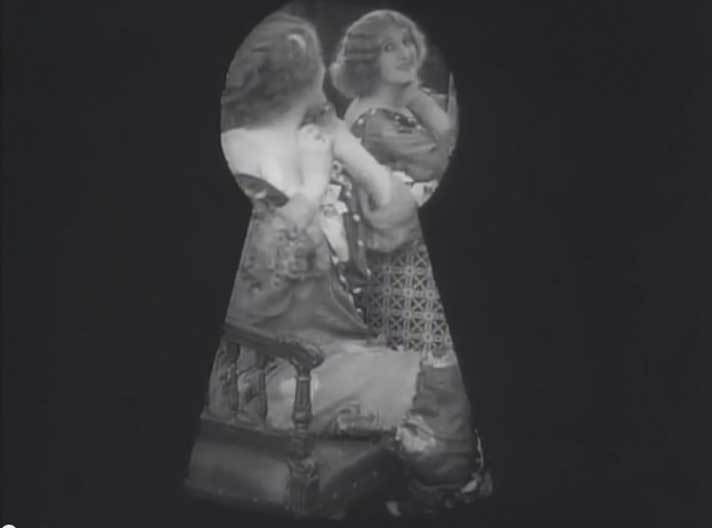
- Russian: Тысяча вторая хитрость
- Directed by: Yevgeny Bauer
- Written by: Vladimir Azov
- Starring: Lina Bauer; S. Rassatov; Sergei Kvasnitsky
- Release date: May 29, 1915
- Running time: 20 min
- Country: Russian Empire
- Language: Russian

The 1002nd Ruse (Russian: Тысяча вторая хитрость) is a 1915 Russian comedy film directed by Yevgeny Bauer.

== Plot ==
The 1002nd Ruse (1915)

The film is set in 1915 Russia. A wife is cheating on her husband while he is fallen asleep after she gave him intoxicating drink. Suddenly the husband wakes up, but his wife tricks him and hides her lover in her closet. While the husband is trying to find out what happened his wife trick him with another ruse...

== Cast ==
- Lina Bauer as The Cunning Wife
- S. Rassatov as The Husband
- Sergei Kvasnitsky as Wife's Lover
