= Peter the Great (1910 film) =

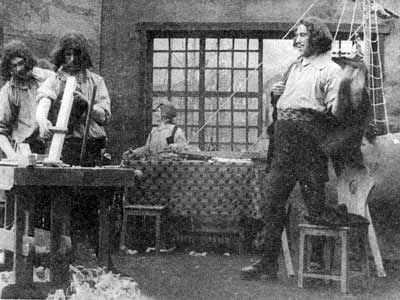
- Russian: Пётр Великий
- Directed by: Vasili Goncharov; Kai Hansen
- Written by: Vasili Goncharov
- Starring: Pyotr Voinov; Ye. Trubetskaya; A. Gorbachevskiy
- Cinematography: Joseph-Louis Mundwiller; Toppi
- Release date: 1910
- Country: Russian Empire

Peter the Great, (Russian: Пётр Великий) is a 1910 silent (Russian-language intertitles) short drama film shot by the Moscow division of the French company Pathé Frères directed by Vasili Goncharov and Kai Hansen. An incomplete reel is preserved, without intertitles. Shot in 1909, it was released on January 19 (6 O.S.), 1910.

== Plot ==
The film shows the key events in the life of Peter the Great.

== Starring ==
- Pyotr Voinov as Pyotr I, Peter the Great
- Vladimir Markov as young Pyotr
- Ye. Trubetskaya as Catherine I of Russia
- A. Gorbachevskiy as Boyar Latyshkin
- Vladimir Karin as Lakot
- A. Slavin as Boyar Poltev
- Ye. Talanova as Tsarina-mother
- Vander-Veide as Princess Sofya
- A. Veskov
