= Daughter of Albion Illegal =

1914 film by Boris Glagolin

Daughter of Albion Illegal is a 1914 Russian film directed by Boris Glagolin, based on a story written by Anton Chekhov. This was the second film adaptation of Chekhov's work. The film was released ten years after his death, a time when Chekhov thought no one would be reading his work anymore. It is unknown if a copy of the film exists.

== Cast ==
- Kondrat Yakovlev
