= After Death (1915 film) =

1915 Russian short film

- Russian: По́сле сме́рти
- Directed by: Yevgeni Bauer
- Written by: Ivan Turgenev (novel); Yevgeni Bauer
- Starring: Vitold Polonsky; Olga Rakhmanova; Vera Karalli
- Cinematography: Boris Zavelev
- Music by: Neil Brand
- Release date: 1915
- Running time: About 46 min.
- Country: Russian Empire

After Death (Russian: По́сле сме́рти, Pósle smérti, "After death") is a 1915 Russian film directed by Yevgeni Bauer. It is based on the novella Klara Milich by Ivan Turgenev. After the October Revolution, the Cinema Committee had the film's title changed to Klara Milich to associate it more with Turgenev, as they did not approve of Bauer's significant departures from the original text.

== Plot ==
The film is based on the novella Klara Milich (1883) by Ivan Turgenev.

"Reclusive young man Andrei is reluctantly persuaded out to social events by his friend Tsenin, and encounters the beautiful actress Zoia. The two meet briefly but then he does not see her for months. He is then shocked to learn that she has collapsed and died, and he becomes morbidly and madly obsessed with her."

== Starring ==
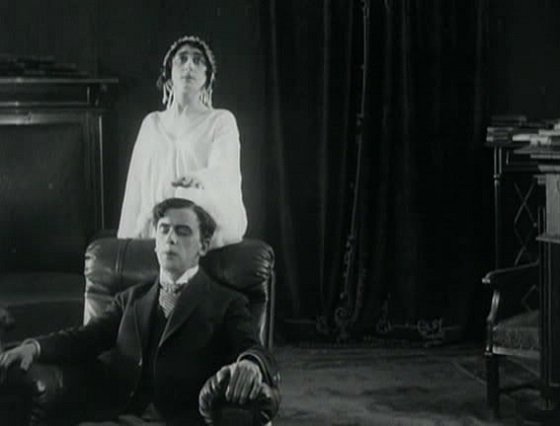
Vitold Polonsky and Vera Karalli

- Vitold Polonsky – Andrei Bagrov
- Olga Rakhmanova – Kapitolana Markovna, Andrei's aunt
- Vera Karalli – Zoia Kadmina
- Mariya Khalatova – Zoia's mother (as M. Khalatova)
- Tamara Gedevanova – Zoia's sister
- Marfa Kassatskaia – Princess Tarskaia
- Georg Asagaroff – Tsenin, Andrei's friend
