= Twilight of a Woman's Soul =

- Russian: Сумерки женской души
- Directed by: Yevgeni Bauer
- Written by: V. Demert
- Starring: Nina Chernova; A. Ugryumov; V. Demert; V. Brianski
- Release date: 1913
- Country: Russian Empire

Twilight of a Woman's Soul (Russian: Сумерки женской души, romanized: Sumerki zhenskoy dushi) is a 1913 Russian drama film directed by Yevgeni Bauer.

== Plot ==
Twilight of a Woman's Soul (1913)

The film begins with a party, one taking place in a beautiful, elaborately decorated garden area, among wealthy citizens, exquisitely dressed and all exhibiting their best manners. There is a missing guest though- the heroine of the story- Vera. She is born into a family of considerable wealth, but she is rather bored and tired of this luxurious but all-too-safe and secluded life. Vera is in her room while the party filled with people of polite society are mingling and dancing at her mother's estate. The butler comes for Vera, and she reluctantly goes down to greet the guests. Even at the party, though, she is bored, and she fakes a headache to leave.

The next day, Vera's mother invites her to go with her to help the poor. Ecstatic, Vera jumps at the chance to do this charity work. She is so moved by helping the poor that she decides to devote her life to their cause. One of the people she helps, a man named Maxim, is enchanted by her beauty. He writes Vera a letter, asking her to come back to help with his worsening medical condition- which is a complete lie. She goes by herself to his apartment, where he rapes her. After he rapes her, Maxim falls into an alcohol-induced slumber. While he is sleeping, Vera escapes his grasp, and then she bludgeons him to death.

Vera, visibly shaken, returns home. Next, she is introduced to Prince Dol'skii. He shows off his excellent marksmanship skills, and she is soon smitten with him. After a month, Prince Dol'skii declares his love for her, and they share a kiss. But when she kisses him, she has a vision of kissing the man who raped her, and she runs away. Prince Dol'skii does not give up on her though, and eventually she happily agrees to marry him. She decides that she must tell him her secret before the marriage, but both attempts to tell him are thwarted. First, she tries to tell him outright, but he won't let her finish and only says “Whatever may have happened in your past, nothing will shake my love.” In the second attempt, she writes him a letter, but he is not at home to receive it, and so she burns it.

Vera and Prince Dol'skii get married. They are happy, kissing and talking in their home, when Vera decides that she must tell him the truth about what happened to her. Her husband reacts poorly to her confession. His love is definitely "shook," so to speak, and he seemingly no longer wants anything to do with her. So, Vera leaves for good. Prince Dol'skii turns to drinking and fast women to cope with his sadness. However, after living this way for about a year, he can no longer stand it, and he sets out to find Vera again.

He hires a private detective, who discovers that she is living abroad. She has become a famous actress over there. The prince leaves Russia to find her, but after two years his search does not turn up any results. He returns to Russia. Sick of his gloomy attitude, a friend of the prince convinces him to go to the opera. Prince Dol'skii agrees, and it is at this opera that Vera is performing. He sees her on stage and immediately sets out to talk to her after the show. He begs her for forgiveness and to come back, but Vera refuses. She tells the prince that it is too late and she no longer loves him. After hearing this, Dol'skii returns home in mental anguish. The last scene of the movie is Prince Dol'skii killing himself.

== Starring ==
- Nina Chernova as Vera Dubovskaya
- A. Ugryumov as Prince Dolsky
- V. Demert as Maksim Petrov
- V. Bryansky as Vitaly Bryansky
