= Surgery (short story) =

- Short story by Anton Chekhov
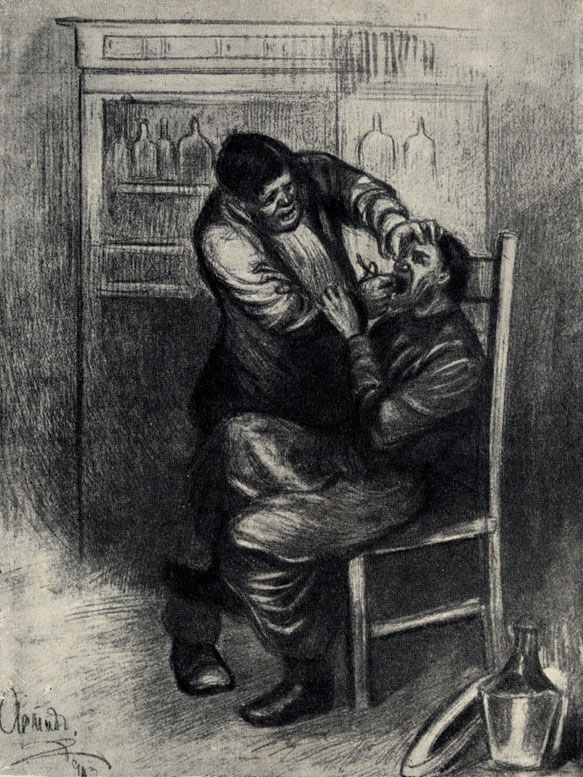
- 1905 illustration by A.Apsit
- Original title: Хирургия
- Country: Russia
- Language: Russian

Publication
- Published in: Oskolki (1884)
- Publisher: Adolf Marks
- Publication date: 11 August 1884

"Surgery" (Russian: Хирургия, romanized: Khirurgiya) is a short story by Anton Chekhov, first published in 1884 by Oskolki.

== Publication ==
"Surgery" was written by Chekhov in August 1884. It was first published in the humorous literary and art weekly magazine Oskolki (No. 32, 11 August 1884), signed A. Chekhonte and subtitled "A Scene".

In 1886, the short story was included in Motley Stories collection. Later, after some stylistic editing, it was also included into the Volume 2 of Chekhov's Collected Works, published by Adolf Marks in 1889. For this edition, Chekhov replaced some colloquial words in the story with more literary ones.

During its author's lifetime, the story was translated into Bulgarian, Polish and Serbo-Croatian languages.

== Background ==
The story was based on Chekhov's experience as a doctor. Mikhail Chekhov, the younger brother of Anton Chekhov, linked the plot of the story with the residence of Chekhov in the summer of 1884 in Voskresensk and his work as a doctor at the Chikinsky zemstvo hospital.

== Plot summary ==
Feldsher Kuryatin, substituting for a chief doctor in a clinic, meets the church sexton Vonmiglasov who suffers from toothache. After thorough examination he decides to remove the tooth. His two unsuccessful efforts, causing much stress and pain both for himself and the patient, result in a quarrel. Vonmiglasov leaves outraged and disgusted, Kuryatin feels quite offended with his client's choice of language and lack of understanding.
