= Moscow Clad in Snow =

1909 silent film

Moscou sous la neige, Moscow clad in snow, Москва под снегом
- Directed by: Joseph-Louis Mundwiller
- Distributed by: Pathé Frères
- Release date: April 9, 1909 (U.S.)
- Running time: 7 minutes
- Country: United States
- Languages: Silent; English intertitles

The full film

Moscow Clad in Snow is a 1909 short silent documentary film directed by Joseph-Louis Mundwiller about winter in Moscow 1908.

== Synopsis ==
The film is in four parts. First, the camera pans the Kremlin and Marshal's Bridge. Sleds are parked in rows. Horse-drawn sleighs run up and down a busy street. Next, we visit the mushroom and fish market where common people work and shop. In Petrovsky Park are the well-to-do. Men are in great coats. A file of six or seven women ski past on a narrow lane. Last, there's a general view of Moscow. A slow pan takes us to a view above the river front where the film began.

== Orchestral score on restoration ==
The film is inherently silent. Second Life added a soundtrack of Alexander Borodin music for the restored version of the film released by the Russian firm "Krasny Kofe".
