= Children of the Age =

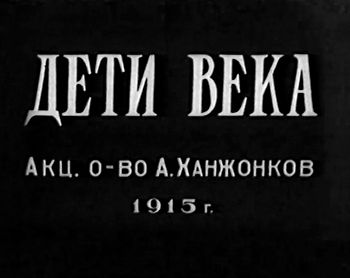
- Russian: Дети века
- Directed by: Yevgeni Bauer
- Written by: M. Mikhailov
- Produced by: Aleksandr Khanzhonkov
- Starring: Arseny Bibikov; V. Glinskaya; Ivan Gorsky; Vera Kholodnaya; S. Rassatov; A. Sotnikov
- Cinematography: Boris Zavelev
- Production company: A. Khanzhonkov and Co.
- Release date: 1915
- Country: Russian Empire

Children of the Age (Russian: Дети века) is a 1915 film directed by Yevgeni Bauer.

== Plot ==
Children of the Age (1915)

The film tells about a successful banker who falls in love with Maria Nikolaevna, the wife of one of his employees, and she in turn is tempted by the wealth of the banker.

== Film crew ==
Director: Evgeny Bauer

Cameraman: Boris Zavelev

Producer: Alexander Khanzhonkov

== Starring ==
- Arseny Bibikov as Lebedev
- V. Glinskaya as Lidija Verkhonskaja
- Ivan Gorsky as Maria's husband
- Vera Kholodnaya as Maria
- S. Rassatov as Bank Director
- A. Sotnikov as Lobovich
