= 16th Century Russian Wedding =

1909 film

- Russian: Русская свадьба XVI столетия
- Directed by: Vasili Goncharov
- Written by: Vasili Goncharov; Pyotr Sukhonin (play)
- Produced by: Aleksandr Khanzhonkov
- Starring: Aleksandra Goncharova; Vasili Stepanov; Andrey Gromov; Lidiya Tridenskaya; Pyotr Chardynin
- Cinematography: Vladimir Siversen
- Production company: Khanzhonkov Trading House
- Release date: 1909
- Country: Russian Empire

16th Century Russian Wedding (Russian: Русская свадьба XVI столетия) is a 1909 Russian silent short drama film directed and written by Vasili Goncharov.

== Origin ==
The film is based on a play of Pyotr Sukhonin Русская свадьба в исходе XVI века, 'Russian Wedding at the End of the 16th Century'. It was first staged in 1852 by Alexandrinsky Theatre by Aleksandr Yablochkin, which enjoyed populrity for nearly 60 years.

== Plot ==
A young boyar on the road accidentally overturns an oncoming cart in which a young noblewoman rides, who, fortunately, was not injured. After arriving home, where his parents are planning to marry him to a girl he shouldn't see before the wedding. After the wedding, the bride removes the veil and the boyar recognizes the stranger whom he had met on the road.

== Starring ==
- Aleksandra Goncharova as bride
- Vasili Stepanov as bride's father
- Andrey Gromov as groom
- Lidiya Tridenskaya as groom's mother
- Pyotr Chardynin as groom's father
- Pavel Biryukov as matchmaker
- Ivan Kamsky as matchmaker
- Ivan Potyomkin as matchmaker
