= Joseph-Louis Mundwiller =

French cinematographer (1886–1967)

- Born: 10 April 1886; Mülhausen, Alsace, German Empire
- Died: 9 July 1967 (aged 81); Enghien-les-Bains, Val-d'Oise, France
- Occupation: Cinematographer
- Years active: 1908–1942

Joseph-Louis Mundwiller (10 April 1886 – 9 July 1967) was a cinematographer. He was born in Mülhausen in Alsace following the region's annexation into the German Empire after the Franco-Prussian War. He worked in the French cinema. In 1909 he directed an early travelogue Moscow Clad in Snow.

== Selected filmography ==
- Moscow Clad in Snow (1909)
- The Duel (1910)
- Princess Tarakanova (1910)
- Novel with a Double Bass (1911)
- Anna Karenina (1911)
- The House of Mystery (1923)
- Le Brasier ardent (1923)
- The Masked Woman (1924)
- Muche (1927)
- Paris-New York-Paris (1928)
- A Foolish Maiden (1929)
- Le Bled (1929)
- Chotard and Company (1933)
- Street Without a Name (1934)
- Paris-Deauville (1934)
- Odette (1934)
- Lovers and Thieves (1935)
- Crime and Punishment (1935)
- The Mutiny of the Elsinore (1936)
- The Man from Nowhere (1937)
- Peace on the Rhine (1938)
- Thérèse Martin (1939)
- The Duraton Family (1939)

== Bibliography ==
- Lewis, Jon. Essential Cinema: An Introduction to Film Analysis. Cengage Learning, 2013.
