= Vasily Goncharov =

Russian film director and screenwriter (1861–1915)

Vasily Mikhailovich Goncharov (Василий Михайлович Гончаров)
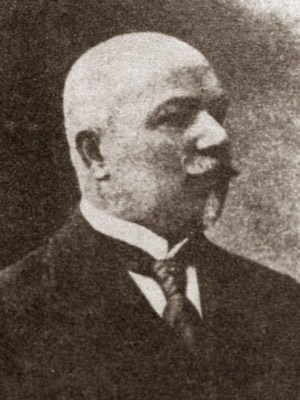
- Born: 1861; Voronezh, Russian Empire
- Died: 23 August 1915 (aged 53-54); Moscow, Russian Empire
- Occupation(s): Film director, screenwriter
- Years active: 1908–1915

Vasily Mikhailovich Goncharov (Russian: Василий Михайлович Гончаров) (1861 – 23 August 1915) was a Russian film director and screenwriter, one of the pioneers of the film industry in the Russian Empire, who directed an early Russian feature film Defence of Sevastopol.

== Filmography ==
Russian Title	Transliteration	English title	Release date	Notes
1909
Песнь про купца Калашникова	Pesn' pro kuptsa Kalashnikova	Song About the Merchant Kalashnikov	2 March 1909	lost
Русская свадьба XVI столетия	Russkaya svadba XVI stoletiya	A 16th Century Russian Wedding	25 April 1909	
Преступление и наказание	Prestuplenie i nakazanie	Crime and Punishment	May 1909	lost
Вий	Viy	Viy (Vii)	27 Sept 1909	Based on a novella by Nikolai Gogol. Lost
Ухарь-купец	Ukhar'-kupyets	The Happy-go-Lucky Merchant	29 Sept 1909	
Смерть Иоанна Грозного	Smert Ioanna Groznovo	The Death of Ivan the Terrible	6 October 1909	
Мазепа	Mazepa	Mazeppa	27 October 1909	
Чародейка	Charodeyka	The Enchantress	28 October 1909	with Pyotr Chardynin
Ванька-ключник	Vanka-klyuchnik	Vanka the Steward	1 November 1909	
Драма в Москве	Drama v Moskve	Drama in Moscow	Never released	lost
1910
Пётр Великий	Pyotr Velikiy	Peter the Great	6 January 1910	with Kai Hansen
В полночь на кладбище	V polnoch na kladbishe	At Midnight in the Graveyard	30 Jan 1910	lost
Выбор царской невесты	Vybor tsarskoj nevesty	Choosing of the Tsar's Bride	9 March 1910	Filmed in 1908. Lost
Русалка	Rusalka	The Water Nymph	30 March 1910	
Генерал Топтыгин	General Toptygin	General Bruin	15 May 1910	
Коробейники	Korobeiniki	Korobeiniki	30 August 1910	
Жизнь и смерть Пушкина	Zhizn i smert Pushkina	Life and Death of Pushkin	3 September 1910	
Наполеон в России	Napoleon v Rossiya	Napoleon in Russia		
1911
Евгений Онегин	Evgeniy Onegin	Eugene Onegin	1 March 1911	
Оборона Севастополя	Oborona Sevastopolya	Defence of Sevastopol	9 September 1911	
Жизнь за царя	Zhizn za tsarya	A Life for the Tsar		
1912
1812 год	1812 god	1812	25 August 1912	with Kai Hansen and Aleksandr Uralsky
Крестьянская доля	Krestyanskaya dolya	The Peasants' Lot	13 November 1912	
Братья-разбойники	Bratya-razboyniki	The Robber Brothers		
1913
Воцарение дома Романовых	Votsarenie doma Romanovyh	Accession of the Romanov Dynasty	16 February 1913	with Pyotr Chardynin
Хас Булат	Khas Bulat	Khas Bulat		
Покорение Кавказа	Pokorenie Kavkaza	The Conquest of Caucasus		lost
1914
Волга и Сибирь	Volga i Sibir	Volga and Siberia		
