= The Water Nymph (1910 film) =

1910 short film by Vasili Goncharov

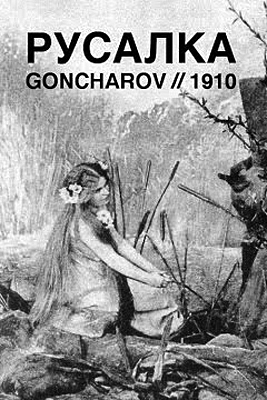
- Russian: Русалка
- Directed by: Vasili Goncharov
- Written by: Vasili Goncharov; Alexander Pushkin (play)
- Starring: Vasili Stepanov; Aleksandra Goncharova; Andrey Gromov
- Cinematography: Vladimir Siversen
- Release date: 1910
- Country: Russian Empire

The Water Nymph (Rusalka, Russian: Русалка) is a 1910 Russian fantasy drama film directed by Vasili Goncharov.

== Plot ==
The Water Nymph (1910)

The film is based on the play The Water Nymph by Alexander Pushkin.

== Starring ==
- Vasili Stepanov as The Miller
- Aleksandra Goncharova as Natalya, His Daughter
- Andrey Gromov as The Prince
