= Yevgeni Bauer =

Russian film director (1865–1917)

- Евгений Бауэр
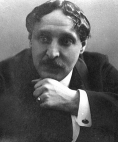
- Bauer in c. 1910
- Born: 1865; Moscow, Russian Empire
- Died: 22 June 1917 (aged 51–52); Yalta, Russian Empire
- Occupations: Film director; screenwriter
- Years active: 1913–1917

Yevgeni Franzevich Bauer (Russian: Евгений Францевич Бауэр; 1865 – 22 June [O.S. 9 June] 1917) was a Russian film director of silent films, theatre artist and screenwriter. His work had a great influence on the aesthetics of Russian cinematography at the beginning of the 20th century.

Bauer made more than seventy films between 1913 and 1917, of which 26 survived. He already used the relatively long sequence shots and displacements that would come to be associated with camera virtuosos. The Los Angeles Times film critic Kenneth Turan called Bauer "the greatest director you've never heard of". Georges Sadoul called him "the first true artist in the history of cinema".

== Biography ==
Bauer was born in Moscow in 1865, the son of the Bohemian immigrant musician Franz Bauer and his wife, an operatic singer. From childhood, Bauer displayed artistic tendencies and participated in his favourite dramatised scenes (his sister was a professional actress).

In 1887, Bauer graduated from the Moscow School of Painting, Sculpture and Architecture. He tried out a number of different professions, first working as a caricaturist, drawing satirical sketches for the press. He then became a master of art photography, before moving to work in the theatre, as a producer, an impresario, and a professional set designer. In the 1890s, he married the actress and dancer Lina Ancharovna, whose surname he used during the First World War when he went under the pseudonym of Evgeni Ancharov, feeling that his own surname was "too German".

Even in these early years, Bauer was attracted to cinematography and started to work as an artistic producer and director. His first work in the cinema was an order for set decorations for the film "300 Years of the House of Romanov" (1913), produced by Alexander Drankov's film company. After this, Bauer worked for Drankov as a producer and made four films. He then made another four films for the Moscow branch of the French company Pathé Brothers, and then finally started to work for the Khanzhonkov company, which at that time was the unspoken leader in Russian cinematography.

From the end of 1913 to the start of 1917, Bauer made more than 80 films, of which less than half have survived. Bauer worked mainly in the genres of social and psychological drama (although he also made comedies), such as Daydreams, After Death (both 1915), A Life for a Life (1916), and The Revolutionary (1917). He worked with the leading actors of Russian silent cinema, including Ivan Mozzhukhin, Vera Kholodnaya, Vitold Polonsky, Ivan Perestiani, Vera Karalli and others.

In 1917, Bauer and the Khanzhonkov company moved to a new studio in Yalta, where he made the film For Happiness with the young actor Lev Kuleshov. Bauer broke his leg on the set and had to work on his next film, The King of Paris, from a bathchair. However, Bauer started to suffer from complications relating to pneumonia and could not complete this film. On 22 June 1917, Bauer died in a Yalta hospital. His final film was completed by actress Olga Rakhmanova.

== Significance and influence ==
Bauer is considered a leading stylist of Russian silent cinematography and placed particular emphasis on the pictorial aspect of film-making. He is considered a master of psychological drama, and also one of the first Russian directors who developed the artistic side of cinema including montage, mise-en-scene and the composition of the frame. He made great use of his theatrical experience when making his films, the outcomes of which occasionally prefigured future achievements in cinema. Bauer was the first to start to consider the placing of lights on the film-set and changed the lighting during the filming, used unusual filming angles, made frequent use of wide spaces, and filmed through "gaseous" material to produce the effect of fog. He attributed great significance to the composition of each shot, constructing decor and natural shots with artistic expressions of classical landscapes, made use of camera movement to widen the space of the shot, and add a dramatic effect. Bauer's artistic experiments and outstanding expertise gave him a reputation as the leading director in Russian cinema.

== Selected filmography ==
- 1913 - Uncle's Apartment (with Pyotr Chardynin)
- 1913 - Twilight of a Woman's Soul
- 1914 - The Post Troika Races Along
- 1914 - The Free Bird
- 1914 - The Girl from the Street
- 1914 - Her Heroic Feat
- 1914 - Life and Death
- 1914 - Silent Witnesses
- 1914 - Glory to Us, Death to the Enemy
- 1914 - Tears
- 1915 - Daydreams
- 1915 - The 1002nd Ruse
- 1915 - Children of the Age
- 1915 - Heavenly Wings
- 1915 - Song of Triumphant Love
- 1915 - Leon Drey
- 1915 - The Vanquisher of Women's Hearts
- 1915 - After Death
- 1915 - The Happiness of Eternal Night
- 1915 - The Thousand and Second Cunning
- 1916 - The Old Wrestler's Grief
- 1916 - A Life for a Life
- 1916 - The Queen of the Screen
- 1917 - Alarm
- 1917 - The Revolutionary
- 1917 - The Dying Swan
- 1917 - For Happiness
- 1917 - The King of Paris
Twilight of a Woman's Soul

Nemye svideteli (1914)

The 1002nd Ruse (1915)

After Death (1915)

Gryozi (1915)

The Dying Swan (1917)

For Happiness (1917)
