= Andrey Gromov =

- Born: Andrey Gromov; January 3, 1887; Moscow, Russian Empire
- Died: February 14, 1922 (aged 35); Riga, Latvia
- Occupations: Actor, director, screenwriter
- Years active: 1908–1918

Andrey Gromov (Russian: Андрей Антонович Громов; 1887 – 1922) was a Russian film actor. Gromov played in about 40 films.

== Selected filmography ==
- 1909 — 16th Century Russian Wedding
- 1909 — Mazeppa
- 1909 — Boyarin Orsha
- 1910 — The Water Nymph
- 1910 — The Queen of Spades
- 1911 — Defence of Sevastopol
- 1912 — 1812
- 1913 — Uncle's Apartment
- 1914 — Silent Witnesses
- 1915 _ The Portrait
- 1916 — Mirages
- 1917 — The Dying Swan
