= Aleksandra Goncharova (actress) =

Russian actress

- Born: Aleksandra Goncharova; 1888
- Died: 1969 (aged 80–81)
- Occupation: actress
- Years active: 1908–1915

Aleksandra Goncharova (Russian: Александра Гончарова) was a Russian film actress.

== Selected filmography ==
- 1908 — 16th Century Russian Wedding
- 1909 — Boyarin Orsha
- 1910 — The Water Nymph
- 1910 — The Queen of Spades
- 1911 — Defence of Sevastopol
