= Film industry =

Institutions of filmmaking

The film industry or motion picture industry comprises the technological and commercial institutions of filmmaking, i.e., film production companies, film studios, cinematography, animation, film production, screenwriting, pre-production, post-production, film festivals, distribution, and actors. Though the expense involved in making film almost immediately led film production to concentrate under the auspices of standing production companies, advances in affordable filmmaking equipment, as well as an expansion of opportunities to acquire investment capital from outside the film industry itself, have allowed independent film production to evolve.

The global box office had an annual revenue of $42.2 billion in 2019, but declined to $33.5 billion in 2025. Including box office and home entertainment revenue, the global film industry had an annual revenue of $136 billion in 2018, but declined to $112.93 billion in 2025. Hollywood is the world's oldest national film industry and the largest in terms of box office gross revenue. The cinema of India is the largest industry in terms of feature films produced and the largest market in terms of ticket sales.

== Modern film industry ==
The worldwide theatrical market had a box office of US$42.2 billion in 2019. The top three continents/regions by box-office gross were Indo-Pacific with US$17.8 billion, the U.S. and Canada with US$11.4 billion, and Europe, the Middle East and North Africa with US$10.3 billion. As of 2019, the largest markets by box office were, in decreasing order, the United States, China, Japan, South Korea, the United Kingdom, France, and India. As of 2019, the countries with the largest number of film productions were India, and the United States. In Europe, significant centres of movie production are France, Germany, Spain, Italy, and the United Kingdom.

=== China ===
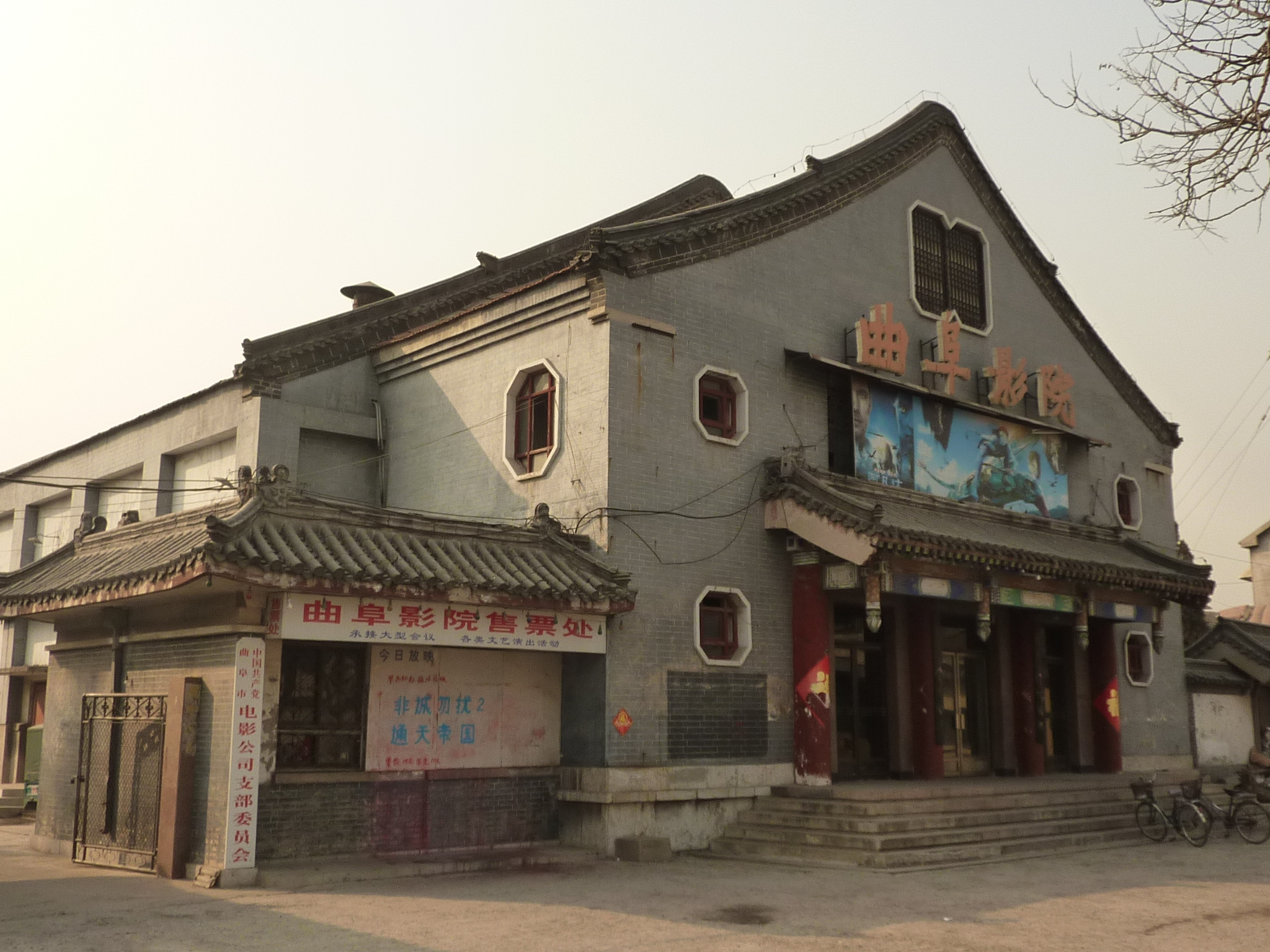
Old Chinese Cinema in Qufu, Shandong

The cinema of China is one of three distinct historical threads of Chinese-language cinema together with the cinema of Hong Kong and the cinema of Taiwan. Cinema was introduced in China in 1896 and the first Chinese film, Dingjun Mountain, was made in 1905, with the film industry being centered on Shanghai in the first decades. China is the home of one of the largest film studios in the world, the Hengdian World Studios, and in 2010 it had the third largest film industry by number of feature films produced annually. For the next decade, the production companies were mainly foreign-owned, and the domestic film industry was centered on Shanghai, a thriving entrepot and the largest city in the Far East. In 1913, the first independent Chinese screenplay, The Difficult Couple, was filmed in Shanghai by Zheng Zhengqiu and Zhang Shichuan.

As the Sixth Generation gained international exposure, many subsequent films were joint ventures and projects with international backers but remained quite resolutely low-key and low-budget. Jia's Platform (2000) was funded in part by Takeshi Kitano's production house, while his Still Life was shot on HD video. Still Life was a surprise addition and Golden Lion winner of the 2006 Venice International Film Festival. Still Life, which concerns provincial workers around the Three Gorges region, sharply contrasts with the works of Fifth Generation Chinese directors like Zhang Yimou and Chen Kaige who were at the time producing House of Flying Daggers (2004) and The Promise (2005). It featured no star of international renown and was acted mostly by non-professionals. In 2012 the country became the second-largest market in the world by box office receipts. In 2014, the gross box office in China was ¥29.6 billion (US$4.82 billion), with domestic films having a share of 55%. China has also become a major hub of business for Hollywood studios.

In 2018, China's gross box office was US$8.9 Billion In 2013, China's gross box office was ¥21.8 billion (US$3.6 billion), the second-largest film market in the world by box office receipts It increased to $4.8 Billion in 2014 box office grosser in film industry. Due to the COVID-19 pandemic, in 2020 China overtook North America as world's biggest box office, being the first country to achieve this status. China retained this status in 2021. However, in 2022, North America once again overtook China as the global box office's biggest market.

=== United States ===
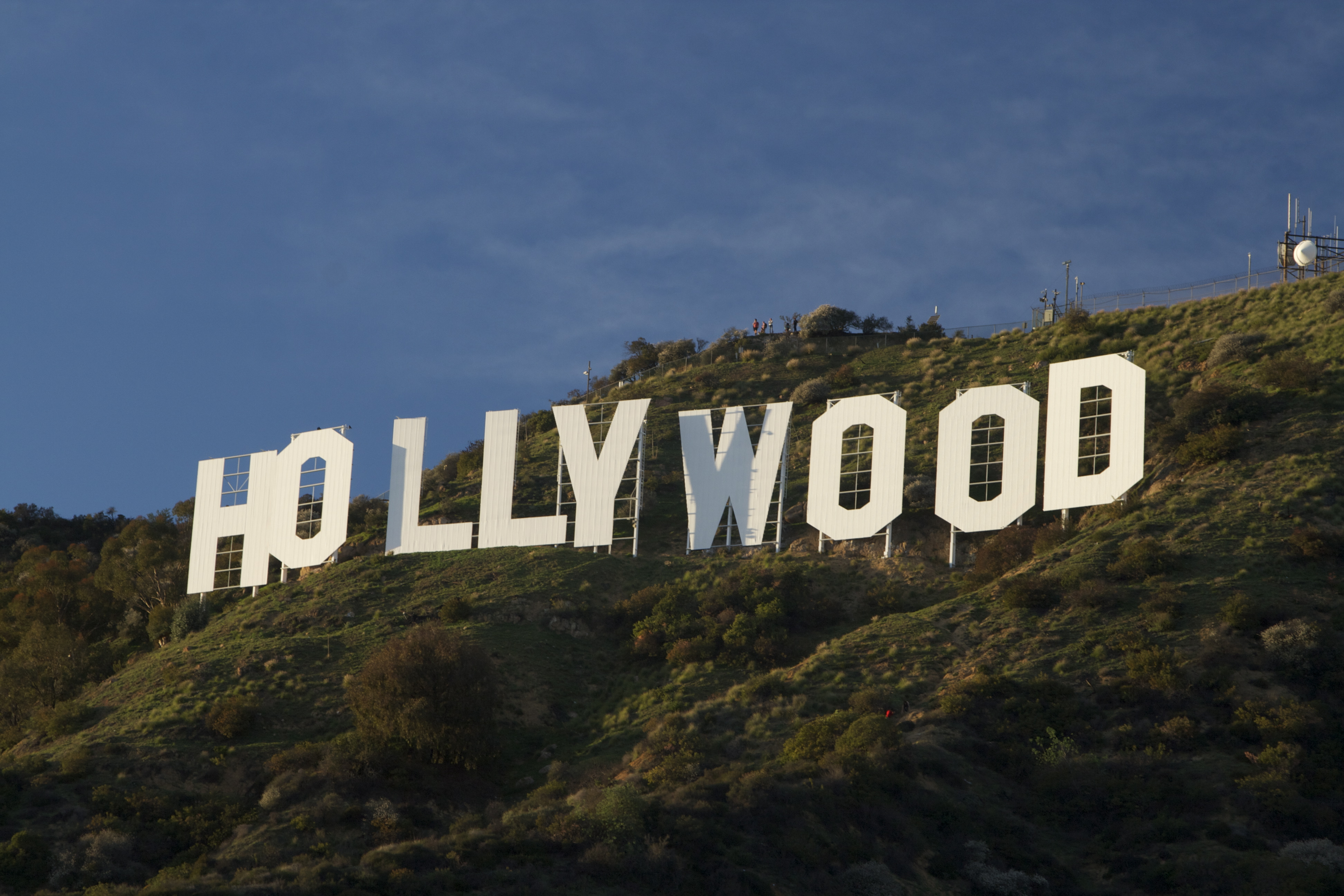
The Hollywood Sign

The cinema of the United States, often generally referred to as Hollywood, has had a profound effect on cinema across the world since the early 20th century. The United States cinema (Hollywood) is one of the oldest film industry in the world and also the largest film industry in terms of revenue. Hollywood is the primary nexus of the U.S. film industry with established film study facilities such as the American Film Institute, LA Film School, and NYFA being established in the area. However, four of the six major film studios are owned by East Coast companies. The major film studios of Hollywood including Metro-Goldwyn-Mayer, 20th Century Studios, and Paramount Pictures are the primary source of the most commercially successful movies in the world, including movies such as The Sound of Music (1965), Star Wars (1977), Titanic (1997), and Avatar (2009).

American film studios today collectively generate several hundred films every year, making the United States the most prolific producers of films in the world. Most shooting now takes place in California, New York, Louisiana, Georgia and North Carolina. New Mexico, especially in the Albuquerque and Santa Fe areas, had been an increasingly popular state for filming; the television show Breaking Bad was set there, and movies such as No Country for Old Men and Rust were shot there. Between 2009 and 2015, Hollywood consistently grossed $10 billion (or more) annually. Hollywood's award ceremony, the Academy Awards, officially known as The Oscars, is held by the Academy of Motion Picture Arts and Sciences (AMPAS) every year and as of 2019, more than 3,000 Oscars have been awarded.

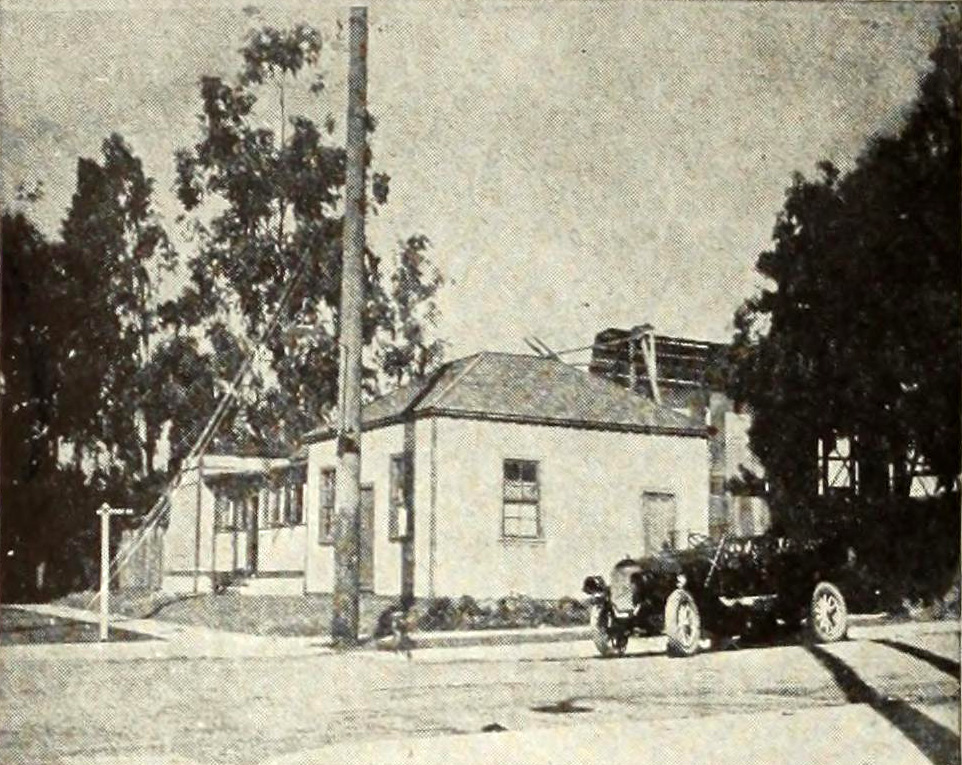
Nestor studio, 1911

On 27 October 1911, Nestor Film Company established Hollywood's first permanent film studio. The California weather allowed for year-round filming. In 1912, Universal Studios was formed, merging Nestor and several other motion picture companies, including Independent Moving Pictures (IMP).

=== India ===
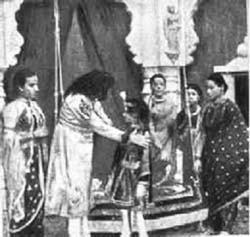
A scene from Raja Harishchandra (1913) – credited as the first full-length Indian motion picture.

India is the largest producer of films in the world and the second-oldest film industry in the world. The country is home to some of the most important cities in the global film industry: Mumbai (previously Bombay), Hyderabad and Chennai (Madras). In 2009, India produced a total of 2,961 films on celluloid; this figure includes 1,288 feature films. Besides being the largest producer of films in the world, India also has the largest number of admissions. Indian film industry is multi-lingual and the largest in the world in terms of ticket sales but 4th-largest in terms of revenue, mainly due to having among the lowest ticket prices in the world. The industry is viewed mainly by a vast film-going Indian public. Indian film industry is also the dominant source of films and entertainment in its neighboring countries of South Asia. The three largest film industries in India are Hindi cinema, Telugu cinema and Tamil cinema. The Hindi film industry is mostly concentrated in Mumbai (Bombay), and it is commonly referred to as Bollywood, a portmanteau of Bombay and Hollywood. Telugu cinema is primarily concentrated in Hyderabad and is commonly referred to as Tollywood. The Tamil film industry i.e. Kollywood is mostly concentrated in Chennai.

Besides the mainstream commercial movies, India also offers a different approach to cinema: the parallel cinema. The parallel cinema movement originated in West Bengal around the 1950s. The movement was initially led by Bengali cinema. It later gained prominence in other film industries in India. Parallel cinema is a blanket term designated to a certain type of films that stray away from the conventions of popular mainstream cinema. Parallel cinema has assumed various forms throughout the years. Filmmakers associated with parallel cinema are Satyajit Ray, Mrinal Sen, Ritwik Ghatak. Parallel films are characterized by their rejection of popular forms like the songs and fight sequences, their affinity for rural settings, their use of method actors, and toned-down color palettes. The best examples of parallel cinema are the most famous films of Ray – Pather Panchali (1955), Aparajito (1956), and The World of Apu (1959) – which formed The Apu Trilogy. Some other examples of such movies are Raincoat, Dhobi Ghat, Mithya. Indian films have garnered popularity not only in the domestic market but also in the international markets, with Dangal having an overseas gross revenue of $260 million, Secret Superstar and Bajrangi Bhaijaan making a gross revenue of $80.4 million, and Baahubali: The Beginning and Baahubali 2: The Conclusion (a blockbuster duology from Telugu cinema) grossing over $370 million globally. In India, they have over 400 production houses with 32 corporate houses; also supporting the livelihood of more than 6 million people.

The other largest film industries are Malayalam cinema, Kannada cinema, Bengali cinema (cinema of West Bengal) and Marathi cinema, primarily located in Trivandrum, Kochi, Bengaluru, Kolkata, and Mumbai, respectively. The remaining majority portion are spread across northern, eastern, western, and southern India (with Gujarati, Punjabi, Odia, Bhojpuri, Assamese Cinema). However, there are several smaller centers of Indian film industries in regional languages centered in the states where those languages are spoken. Indian cinema encloses several artforms like Indian classical music, folk music of different regions throughout the country, Indian classical dance, folk dance, and much more. Bollywood, Kollywood and Tollywood forms the largest portion of the Indian film industry and is viewed all over the Indian subcontinent, and is increasingly popular in Australia, UK, United States, New Zealand, Southeast Asia, Africa, Gulf countries, European countries, East Asia and China. The largest film studio complex in the world is Ramoji Film City located at Hyderabad, India, which opened in 1996 and measures 674 ha (1,666 acres). Comprising 47 sound stages, it has permanent sets ranging from railway stations to temples.

By 1986, India's annual film output had increased from 741 films produced annually to 833 films, making India the world's largest film producer. As of 2014, Bollywood represents 45% of Indian net box office revenue, while Tamil and Telugu cinemas together represent 36%, and the rest of the regional film industries constitute 21% of Indian cinema. By 2021, Telugu Cinema (Tollywood) has overtaken both Hindi cinema (Bollywood) and Tamil cinema (Kollywood), emerged as the largest film industry in India in terms of box-office. In 2023, Bollywood again emerged as the largest film industry in India.

=== Russian Federation ===
The cinema of Russia refers to the film industry in Russia, engaged in producing motion pictures in the Russian language. It began in the Russian Empire, widely developed in the Soviet Union, and the years following its dissolution. The Russian film industry would remain internationally recognized. In the 21st century, Russian cinema has become known internationally with films such as Hardcore Henry (2015), Leviathan (2014), Night Watch (2004) and Brother (1997). The Moscow International Film Festival began in Moscow during 1935. The Nika Award is the main annual national film award in Russia.

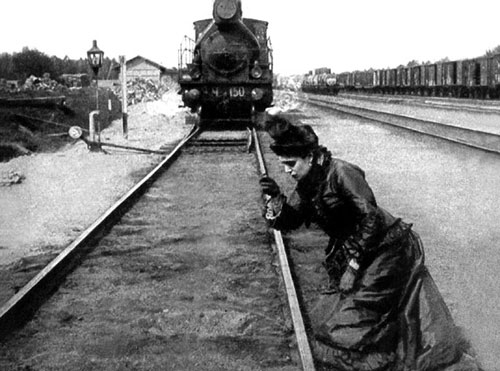
Maria Germanova in Anna Karenina (1914)

The first films seen in the Russian Empire were brought in by the Lumière brothers, who exhibited films in Moscow and St. Petersburg in May 1896. That same month, Lumière cameraman Camille Cerf made the first film in Russia, recording the coronation of Nicholas II at the Kremlin. Aleksandr Drankov produced the first Russian narrative film Stenka Razin (1908), based on events told in a folk song and directed by Vladimir Romashkov. Among the notable Russian filmmakers of the era were Aleksandr Khanzhonkov and Ivan Mozzhukhin, who made Defence of Sevastopol in 1912. Yakov Protazanov made Departure of a Grand Old Man (1912), a biographical film about Lev Tolstoy.

Animation pioneer Ladislas Starevich made the first Russian animated film (and the first stop motion puppet film with a story) in 1910 – Lucanus Cervus. His other stop-motion shorts The Beautiful Leukanida (1912) and The Cameraman's Revenge (1912), produced for Aleksandr Khanzhonkov, are also among the first animated films. In the following years, Starevich made shorts based on fables such as The Grasshopper and the Ant (1913), as well as World War I propaganda films..

=== United Kingdom ===
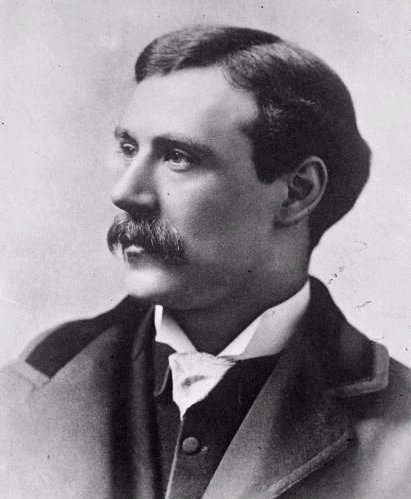
William Friese-Greene

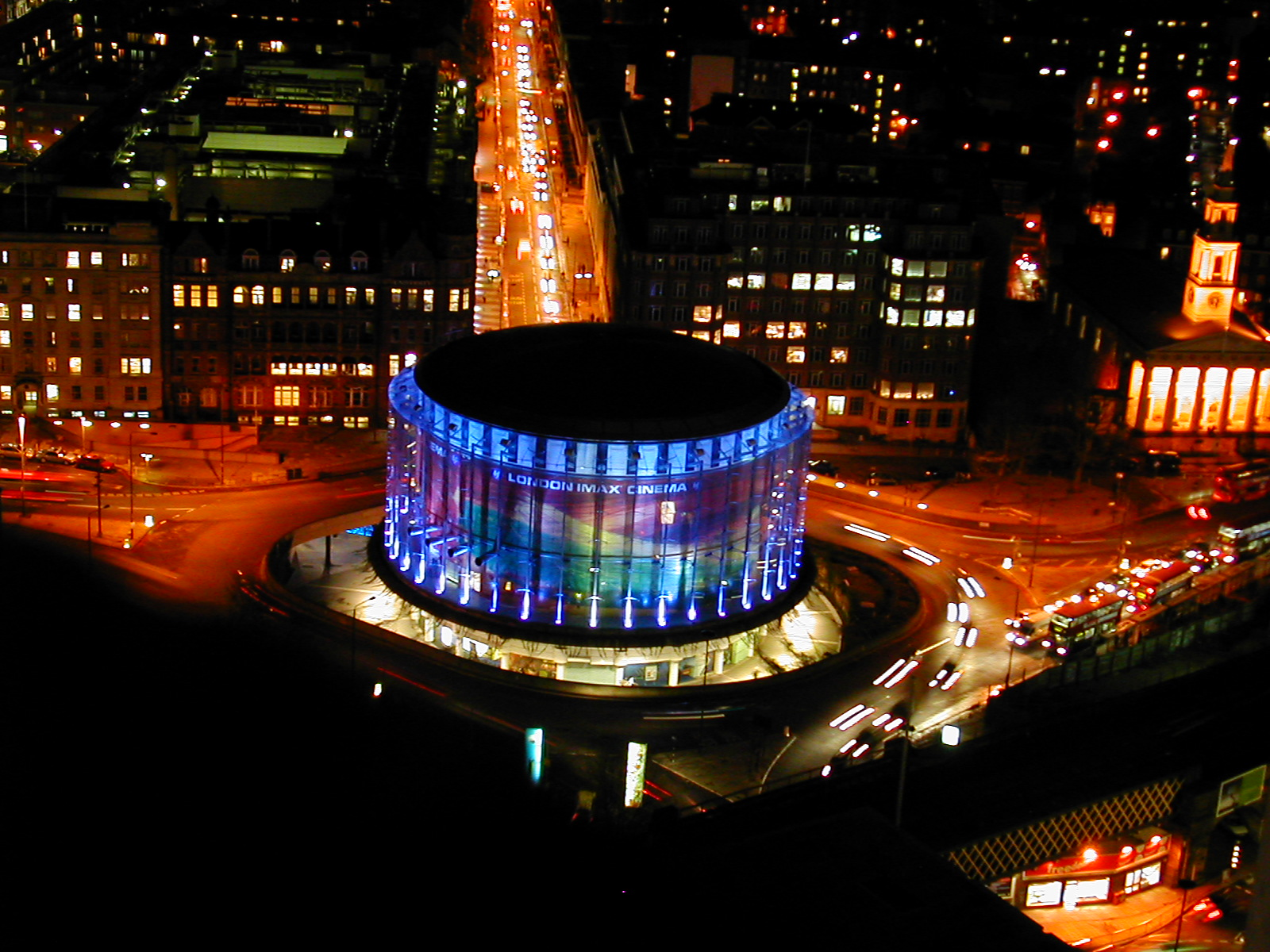
London IMAX has the largest cinema screen in Britain with a total screen size of 520 m^{2}.

The United Kingdom has had a significant film industry for over a century. While film production reached an all-time high in 1936, the "golden age" of British cinema is usually thought to have occurred in the 1940s, during which the directors David Lean, Michael Powell, (with Emeric Pressburger) and Carol Reed produced their most highly acclaimed work. Many British actors have achieved worldwide fame and critical success, such as Maggie Smith, Roger Moore, Michael Caine, Sean Connery, Daniel Day-Lewis, Gary Oldman, and Kate Winslet. Some of the films with the largest-ever box-office returns have been made in the United Kingdom, including the third- and fourth-highest-grossing film series (Harry Potter and James Bond).

The first moving picture was shot in Leeds by Louis Le Prince in 1888, and the first moving pictures developed on celluloid film were made in Hyde Park, London, in 1889 by British inventor William Friese Greene, who patented the process in 1890.

As of 23 August 2026, four of the top fifty-highest-grossing films worldwide of all time have some British historical, cultural or creative dimensions: Titanic (1997), Harry Potter and the Deathly Hallows – Part 2 (2011), The Lord of the Rings: The Return of the King (2003), and Pirates of the Caribbean: Dead Man's Chest (2006). Adding four more Harry Potter films and one more Lord of the Rings movie, plus the Tim Burton version of Alice in Wonderland (2010), and half of the top twenty most financially successful films had a British dimension.

British influence can also be seen with the 'English Cycle' of Disney animated films, which include Alice in Wonderland (1951), Peter Pan (1953), One Hundred and One Dalmatians (1961), The Sword in the Stone (1963), and The Jungle Book (1967). Disney first became interested in live-action films as a means of using financial reserves which had built up in Britain, and could not be repatriated owing to exchange controls, by making two films from Scottish and English sources. These were Treasure Island (1950) and The Story of Robin Hood and His Merrie Men (1952), which were both successes at the box office. The studio continued to draw on British source material for its animated films after Walt Disney died in 1967, with the cartoon feature films Robin Hood (1973), The Many Adventures of Winnie the Pooh and The Rescuers (both 1977), one of many Disney to draw on A. A. Milne's characters.

In the 1970s and 1980s, British studios established a reputation for great special effects in films such as Superman (1978), Alien (1979), and Batman (1989). Some of this reputation was founded on the core of talent brought together for the filming of 2001: A Space Odyssey (1968) who subsequently worked together on series and feature films for Gerry Anderson. The Bristol-based Aardman Animations is known for its stop-motion animation.

In late 1998, Channel 4 launched their free-to-air film channel Film4 – a channel specifically designed to show films. It broadcasts from 11:00 am BST and competes with pay television film network Sky Cinema.

The London-based visual effects company Framestore, with Tim Webber the visual effects supervisor, have worked on the films The Dark Knight (2008) and Gravity (2013), with new techniques involved in Gravity taking three years to complete.

=== France ===
France is the birthplace of cinema and was responsible for many of its significant contributions to the art form and the film-making process itself. Several important cinematic movements, including the Nouvelle Vague, began in the country. It is noted for having a particularly strong film industry, due in part to protections afforded by the French government.

French cinema is sometimes intertwined with the cinema of foreign nations. Directors from nations such as Poland (Roman Polanski, Krzysztof Kieślowski, and Andrzej Żuławski), Argentina (Gaspar Noé and Edgardo Cozarinsky), Russia (Alexandre Alexeieff, Anatole Litvak), Austria (Michael Haneke), and Georgia (Géla Babluani, Otar Iosseliani) are prominent in the ranks of French cinema. Conversely, some French directors have had careers in other countries, such as Luc Besson, Jacques Tourneur, or Francis Veber in the United States.

Another element supporting this fact is that Paris has the highest density of cinemas in the world, measured by the number of movie theaters per inhabitant, and that in most "downtown Paris" movie theaters, foreign movies which would be secluded to "art houses" cinemas in other places are shown alongside "mainstream" works. Philippe Binant realized, on 2 February 2000, the first digital cinema projection in Europe, with the DLP CINEMA technology developed by Texas Instruments, in Paris. Paris also boasts the Cité du cinéma, a major studio north of the city, and Disney Studio, a theme park devoted to the cinema and the third theme park near the city behind Disneyland and Parc Asterix.

In 2015, France saw a record-breaking 300 feature-length films produced. US and UK films only represented 44.9% of total admissions in 2014. This is largely due to the commercial strength of domestic productions, which accounted for 44.5% of admissions in 2014 (35.5% in 2015; and 35.3% in 2016). In the mid-2000s, the French film industry was described as being "closer to being entirely self-sufficient than any other country in Europe, recovering around 80–90% of their budget in revenues generated from the domestic market". In 2018, French films had an international box office of €237m with 40 million admissions (down 52% from 2017), with Italy being the top foreign market.

=== Japan ===
Japan has one of the oldest and largest film industries in the world; as of 2010, it was the fourth largest by number of feature films produced. Movies have been produced in Japan since 1897, when the first foreign cameramen arrived.

In a Sight & Sound list of the best films produced in Asia, Japanese works made up eight of the top 12, with Tokyo Story (1953) ranked number one. Tokyo Story also topped the 2012 Sight & Sound directors' poll of The Top 50 Greatest Films of All Time, dethroning Citizen Kane, while Akira Kurosawa's Seven Samurai (1954) was voted the greatest foreign-language film of all time in BBC's 2018 poll of 209 critics in 43 countries. Japan has won the Academy Award for the Best Foreign Language Film four times (Rashomon, Gate of Hell, Samurai I: Musashi Miyamoto, and Departures), more than any other Asian country..

=== Iran ===
The cinema of Iran (Persian: سینمای ایران) or cinema of Persia refers to the cinema and film industries in Iran which produce a variety of commercial films annually. Iranian art films have garnered international fame and now enjoy a global following.

Along with China, Iran has been lauded as one of the best exporters of cinema in the 1990s. Some critics now rank Iran as the world's most important national cinema, artistically, with a significance that invites comparison to Italian neorealism and similar movements in past decades. German filmmaker Werner Herzog has praised Iranian cinema as one of the world's most important artistic cinemas. It is notable, that Iran has won 2 Academy Awards and has been nominated 3 times, which is ranked 11th in the world cinema, second in Asia after Japan, and first in the Middle East.

=== Turkey ===
The Turkish film market stands out in the pan-European landscape as the only market where national films regularly outperform US films. In 2013, it had 1.2 million number of admissions and 87 feature films were released. Between 2004 and 2014, the estimated 12.9 million admissions generated on non-national European markets only accounted for 7% of total admissions to Turkish films in Europe (including Turkey). This was the third lowest share among the 30 European markets for which such data are available and clearly illustrates the strong dependence of Turkish films on the domestic market, a feature which is shared by Polish and Russian films.

In 2014, Kış Uykusu (Winter's Sleep) won the Cannes Film Festival Award for Best Film. In 2013, Turkey still ranked behind the Netherlands in terms of the box office with just over EUR 200 million as Europe's eight largest box office market ahead of Sweden and Switzerland with a clear gap to the top 6 markets all of which registered GBO between EUR 504 million (Spain) up to over EUR 1 billion in France, the UK, Germany and the Russian Federation. Cinema going is comparatively cheap in Turkey. In 2013 a cinema ticket cost an average of EUR 4.0 in Turkey, and this was estimated to be the lowest average ticket price – measured in Euro – in Europe, marginally cheaper than in several Central and Eastern Europe markets like Croatia, Romania, Lithuania or Bulgaria (subject to exchange rates).

=== Egypt ===
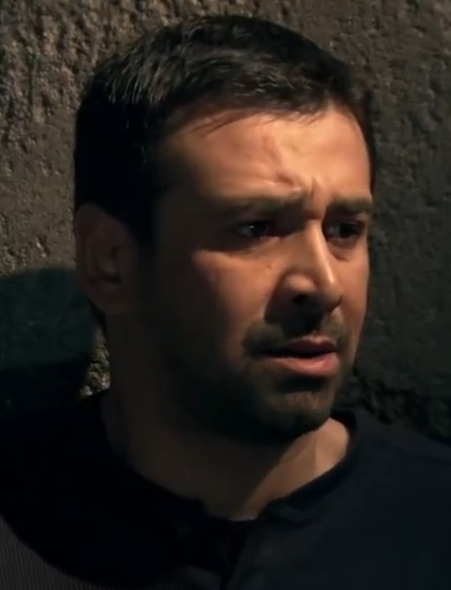
Karim Abdel Aziz

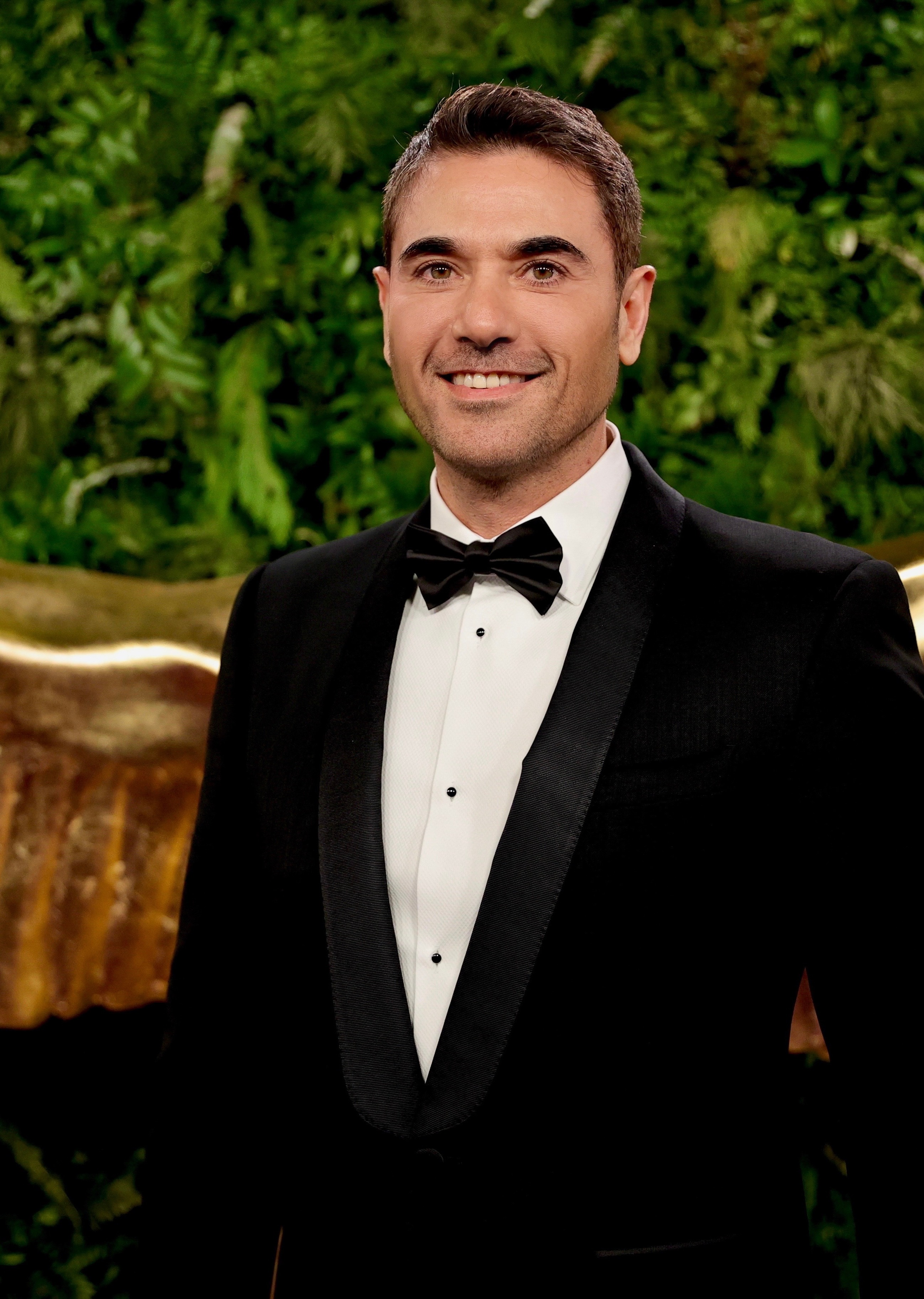
Ahmed Ezz

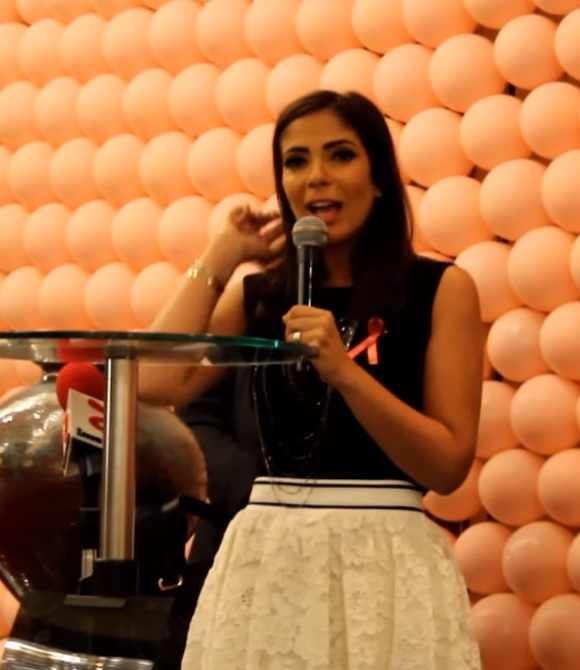
Mona Zaki

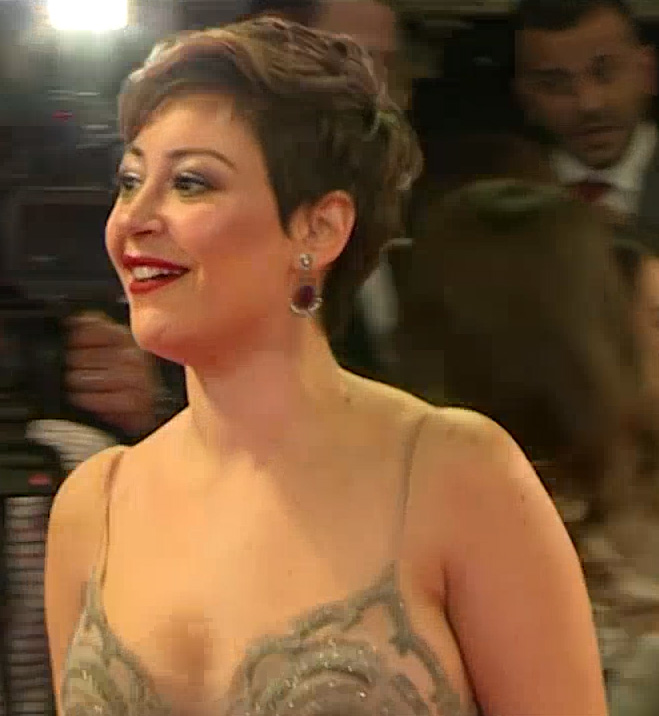
Menna Shalabi

A limited number of silent films were made in Egypt beginning in 1896; 1927's Laila was notable as the first full-length feature. Cairo's film industry became a regional force with the coming of sound. Between 1930 and 1936, various small studios produced at least 44 feature films. In 1936, Studio Misr, financed by industrialist Talaat Harb, emerged as the leading Egyptian equivalent to Hollywood's major studios, a role the company retained for three decades. Of the more than 4,000 short and feature-length films made in MENA region since 1908, more than three-quarters were Egyptian films. Egyptian films are typically spoken in the Egyptian Arabic dialect.

Since 1976, Cairo has held the annual Cairo International Film Festival (CIFF), which is accredited by the International Federation of Film Producers Association. In 1996, the Egyptian Media Production City (EMPC) was inaugurated in 6th of October City south of Cairo, although by 2001, only one of the 29 planned studios was operational. Censorship, formerly an obstacle to freedom of expression, has decreased remarkably by 2012, when the Egyptian cinema had begun to tackle boldly issues ranging from sexual issues to heavy government criticism.

The 1940s, 1950s, and 1960s are generally considered the golden age of Egyptian cinema. As in the West, films responded to the popular imagination, with most falling into predictable genres (happy endings being the norm), and many actors making careers out of playing strongly typed parts. In the words of one critic, "If an Egyptian film intended for popular audiences lacked any of these prerequisites, it constituted a betrayal of the unwritten contract with the spectator, the results of which would manifest themselves in the box office." Since the 1990s, Egypt's cinema has gone in separate directions. Smaller art films attract some international attention but sparse attendance at home. Popular films, often broad comedies such as What A Lie!, and the extremely profitable works of comedian Mohamed Saad, battle to hold audiences either drawn to Western films or, increasingly, wary of the perceived immorality of film.

=== Korean Peninsula ===
The term cinema of Korea (or Korean cinema) encompasses the motion picture industries of North and South Korea. As with all aspects of Korean life during the past century, the film industry has often been at the mercy of political events, from the late Joseon dynasty to the Korean War to domestic governmental interference. While both countries have relatively robust film industries today, only South Korean films have achieved wide international acclaim. North Korean films tend to portray their communist or revolutionary themes.

South Korean films enjoyed a "Golden age" during the late 1950s and 1960s. By 2005 South Korea had become one of few nations to watch more domestic than imported films in theaters due largely to laws placing limits on the number of foreign films able to be shown per theater per year. In the theaters, Korean films must be played for 73 days per year since 2006. On cable TV 25% domestic film quota will be reduced to 20% after KOR-US FTA. The cinema of South Korea had a total box office gross in the country in 2015 of ₩884 billion and had 113,000,000 admissions, 52% of the total admissions.

=== Poland ===
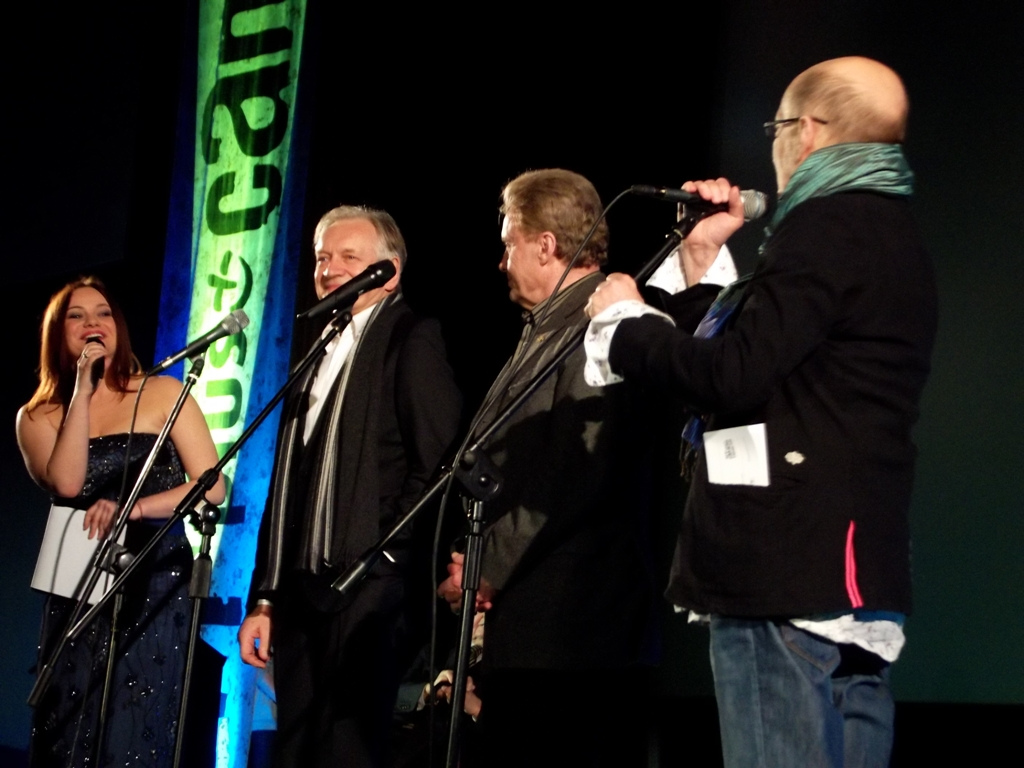
Off Plus Camera Film Festival in Kraków, 2012, with Andrzej Seweryn, Daniel Olbrychski, and Wojciech Pszoniak on stage.

The history of Cinema of Poland is almost as long as the history of cinematography, and it has universally recognized achievements, even though Polish films tend to be less commercially available than films from several other European nations.

After World War II, the communist government built an auteur-based national cinema, trained hundreds of new directors, and empowered them to make films. Filmmakers like Roman Polański, Krzysztof Kieślowski, Agnieszka Holland, Andrzej Wajda, Andrzej Żuławski, Andrzej Munk, and Jerzy Skolimowski impacted the development of Polish film-making. In more recent years, the industry has been producer-led with finance being the key to a film being made, and with many independent filmmakers of all genres, Polish productions tend to be more inspired by American film.

The Polish Film School was under the heavy influence of Italian neorealists. It took advantage of the liberal changes in Poland after 1956 Polish October to portray the complexity of Polish history during World War II and German occupation. Among the most important topics were the generation of former Home Army soldiers and their role in post-war Poland and the national tragedies like the German concentration camps and the Warsaw Uprising. The political changes allowed the group to speak more openly about the recent history of Poland. However, the rule of censorship was still strong when it came to history after 1945 and there were very few films on contemporary events. This marked the major difference between the members of the Polish Film School and Italian neorealists.

The Polish Film School was the first to underline the national character of Poles and one of the first artistic movements in Central Europe to openly oppose the official guidelines of Socialist realism. The members of the movement tend to underline the role of the individual as opposed to collectivity. There were two trends within the movement: young directors such as Andrzej Wajda generally studied the idea of heroism, while another group (the most notable being Andrzej Munk) analyzed the Polish character via irony, humor, and dissection of national myths.

=== Indonesia ===
The biggest film studio in Southeast Asia was soft opened on 5 November 2011 on 10 hectares of land in Nongsa, Batam Island, Indonesia. Infinite Frameworks (IFW) is a Singapore-based company (close to Batam Island) which is owned by a consortium, 90 percent of which is held by Indonesian businessman and film producer Mike Wiluan. In 2010–2011, due to the substantial increase in value-added tax applied to foreign films, cinemas no longer had access to many foreign films, including Oscar-winning films. Foreign films include major box offices from the West and other major film producers of the world. This caused a massive ripple effect on the country's economy. It is assumed that this increased the purchase of unlicensed DVDs. However, even copyright-violating DVDs took longer to obtain. The minimum cost to view a foreign film not screened locally was 1 million Rupiah. This was equivalent to US$100, as it includes a plane ticket to Singapore.

=== Pakistan ===
The cinema of Pakistan, or simply Pakistani cinema (Urdu: پاکستانی سنیما), refers to Pakistan's film industry. Most of the feature films shot in Pakistan are in Urdu, the national language, but may also include films in English, the official language, and regional languages such as Punjabi, Pashto, Balochi, and Sindhi. Lahore has been described as the epicenter of Pakistani cinema, giving rise to the term "Lollywood" as a portmanteau of Lahore and Hollywood.

Before the separation of Bangladesh, Pakistan had three main film production centers: Lahore, Karachi and Dhaka. The regime of Muhammad Zia-ul-Haq, VCRs, film piracy, the introduction of entertainment taxes, strict laws based upon ultra-conservative jurisprudence, was an obstacle to the industry's growth. Once thriving, the cinema in Pakistan had a sudden collapse in the 1980s and by the 2000s "an industry that once produced an average of 80 films annually was now struggling to even churn out few movies." However, the boom in the Television Industry in Karachi which gave rise to bigger privately owned media houses led to a revival of the Pakistan Film Industry in the early 2010s. Karachi, now the biggest production center of the Film Industry in Pakistan produces Urdu, English, and Sindhi language Pakistani movies. Lahore is the second big film producer now (mostly Punjabi movies) followed by Peshawar where mostly Pashto films are produced. Films are also being produced on a very small scale from Islamabad (Urdu and English movies) and Quetta (Balochi movies). Pakistani films are gaining market in the local circuit and international markets like Gulf countries, UK-Europe, US-North America, and Far-East. Many Pakistani movies made their ways to Oscars' foreign language film category i.e. The Day Shall Dawn (1959), The Veil (Ghoonghat) (1963), Zinda Bhaag (2013), Dukhtar (2014), Moor (2015), Mah-e-Mir (2016), Saawan (2017), Cake (2018), Lal Kabootar (2019). Two Pakistani documentary films won the Oscars' for the best documentary film, these are, Saving Face (2012) and A Girl in the River (2016). Pakistani movies especially Urdu movies revolve around family drama, romance, love stories, comedy, thriller, social matters, and political issues. In the contemporary era some Pakistani films have gained international acclaim, these include, Khuda Kay Liye (In the name of God), Bol, Verna, Zinda Bhaag, Load-Wedding, Wrong No., Cake, Teefa in Trouble, Lal Kabootar, Mah-e-Meer, Moor, The Legend of Maula Jatt.

Punjabi cinema is mostly themed on romance, family drama, and action while Pashto cinema revolves around action and tribal feuds.

Major Film Awards include Lux Style Awards, ARY Film Awards, Nigar Awards and National Film Awards.

=== Philippines ===
Cinema of the Philippines began with the introduction of the first moving pictures to the country on August 31, 1897, at the Salón de Pertierra in Manila. The following year, local scenes were shot on film for the first time by a Spaniard, Antonio Ramos, using the Lumiere Cinematograph. While most early filmmakers and producers in the country were mostly wealthy enterprising foreigners and expatriates, on September 12, 1919, Dalagang Bukid (Country Maiden), a movie based on a popular musical play, was the first movie made and shown by Filipino filmmaker José Nepomuceno. Dubbed the "Father of Philippine Cinema", his work marked the start of cinema as an art form in the Philippines.

=== Israel ===
Films have been made in Israel since before independence in 1948. The industry is relatively small economically but Israeli films have been nominated for more Academy Awards for Best Foreign Language Film than any other country in the Middle East. The government is attempting to attract foreign companies to film in Israel by offering subsidies for production costs.

=== Hong Kong ===
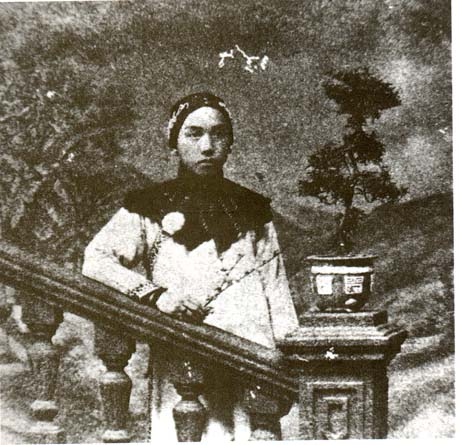
Zhuangzi Tests His Wife (1913) is credited as the first Hong Kong feature film

Hong Kong is a filmmaking hub for the Chinese-speaking world (including the worldwide diaspora) and East Asia in general. For decades it was the third-largest motion picture industry in the world (after India and the US) and the second-largest exporter of films. Despite an industry crisis starting in the mid-1990s and Hong Kong's return to Chinese sovereignty in July 1997 Hong Kong film has retained much of its distinctive identity and continues to play a prominent part on the world cinema stage. Unlike many film industries, Hong Kong has enjoyed little to no direct government support, through either subsidies or import quotas. It has always been a thoroughly commercial cinema, concentrating on crowd-pleasing genres, like comedy and action, and heavily reliant on formulas, sequels, and remakes. Typically of commercial cinemas, its heart is a highly developed star system, which in this case also features substantial overlap with the pop music industry

=== Trinidad and Tobago ===
The Trinidad and Tobago Film Company is the national agency that was established in 2006 to further the development of the film industry. Trinidad and Tobago puts on several film festivals which are organized by different committees and organizations. These include the Secondary Schools Short Film Festival and Smartphone Film Festival organized by Trinidad and Tobago Film Company. There is also an annual Trinidad and Tobago Film Festival which runs for two weeks in the latter half of September.

Trinidad and Tobago's film sector began emerging in the late 1950s to early 1960s and by the late 1970s, there were a handful of local productions, both feature film and television. The first full-length feature film to be produced in Trinidad and Tobago was The Right and the Wrong (1970) by Indian director/writer/producer, Harbance Kumar. The screenplay was written by the Trinidadian playwright, Freddie Kissoon. The rest of the 20th century saw a couple more feature films being made in the country, with Bim (1974), being singled out by Bruce Paddington as "one of the most important films to be produced in Trinidad and Tobago ... and one of the classics of Caribbean cinema." It was one of the first films to feature an almost entirely Trinidadian cast and crew. There was a rise in Trinidadian film production in the 2000s. Films such as Ivan the Terrible (2004), SistaGod (2006), I'm Santana: The Movie (2012), and God Loves the Fighter (2013) were released both locally and internationally. SistaGod had its world premiere at the 2006 Toronto International Film Festival.

=== Nepal ===
Nepali film does not have a very long film history, but the industry has its place in the cultural heritage of the country. It is often referred to as 'Nepali Chalchitra' (which translates to "Nepali films" in English). The terms Kollywood and Kallywood are also used, as a portmanteau of "Kathmandu" and "Hollywood"; "Kollywood" however is more frequently used to refer to Tamil cinema. Chhakka Panja has been considered the highest-grossing film of all time in Nepali film industry and Kohinoor the second highest. The Nepali films The Black Hen (2015) and Kagbeni (2006) received international acclaim. The Nepali feature film White Sun (Seto Surya) received the Best Film award at the 27th Singapore International Film Festival (SGIFF) in 2016.

=== Sri Lanka ===
The Sri Lankan film industry is a relatively young industry that began in 1947 with the film Kadawunu Poronduwa and has seen growth and development, particularly with the establishment of the State Film Corporation in 1971.

Sri Lankan films are usually made in Sinhala and Tamil, the dominant languages of the country.

Lester James Peries, often considered the "father" of Sri Lankan cinema, directed influential films like Rekava (1956) and The God King (1974).

Vimukthi Jayasundara's Sulanga Enu Pinisa won the Camera d'Or for best first film at the 2005 Cannes Film Festival.

The directors Asoka Handagama and Prasanna Vithanage, have won international awards. Handagama's films Asandhimitta and Alborada and Vithanage's films Gaadi and Paradise were critically acclaimed and selected for international film festivals.

In recent years, high-budget films like Aloko Udapadi, Aba and Maharaja Gemunu based on Sinhalese epic historical stories have gained huge success. Furthermore, following the drastic impact on the film industry by the ongoing COVID-19 pandemic, Adaraneeya Prarthana has emerged as one of the highest-grossing films of 2022, and Gajaman is the highest-grossing Sri Lankan film of 2023.

Chanaka Perera's film Gajaman is the first three-dimensional (3D) animation movie in Sri Lanka using motion capture technology.

Sri Lankan director Ilango Ram's film Tentigo is the first Sri Lankan film to be remade into other languages including Spanish, Italian, English, Hindi, Telugu, and Malayalam, and France and Belgium in the future. After gaining positive reviews from critics in multiple film festivals, the film won the special jury award at the Tallinn Black Nights Film Festival in 2023 and was screened at the Glasgow Film Festival and Mostra in 2024. It got selected at the 2nd Eikhoigi Imphal International Film Festival 2025 under the International Competition: Fiction section

International movies shot in Sri Lanka: Sri Lanka has been a location for international films, including The Bridge on the River Kwai.

== History ==
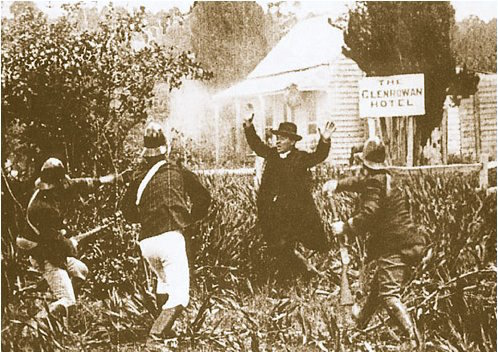
A still from The Story of the Kelly Gang (Australia, 1906; 80 min.)

Les frères Lumière released the first projection with the Cinematograph, in Paris on 28 December 1895. The French film industry in the late 19th century and early 20th century was the world's most important. Auguste and Louis Lumière invented the cinématographe and their L'Arrivée d'un train en gare de La Ciotat in Paris in 1895 is considered by many historians as the official birth of cinematography. The first feature film to be made was the 1906 Australian silent The Story of the Kelly Gang, an account of the notorious gang led by Ned Kelly that was directed and produced by the Melburnians Dan Barry and Charles Tait. It ran, continuously, for eighty minutes.

In the early 1910s, the film industry had fully emerged with D.W. Griffith's The Birth of a Nation. Also in the early 1900s motion picture production companies from New York and New Jersey started moving to California because of the good weather and longer days. Although electric lights existed at that time, none were powerful enough to adequately expose film; the best source of illumination for movie production was natural sunlight. Besides the moderate, dry climate, they were also drawn to the state because of its open spaces and wide variety of natural scenery.

=== Introduction of film industry ===
In 1900, Charles Pathé began film production under the Pathé-Frères brand, with Ferdinand Zecca hired to make the films. By 1905, Pathé was the largest film company in the world, a position it retained until World War I. Léon Gaumont began film production in 1896, supervised by Alice Guy.

From 1904 until the First World War, the Pathé group was the world leader in the film industry, far ahead of American firms. At its peak, Charles Pathé's company had almost 50% of the world film market, including in the United States.

Besides American Mutoscope, there were also numerous smaller producers in the United States, and some of them established a long-term presence in the new century. American Vitagraph, one of these minor producers, built studios in Brooklyn, and expanded its operations in 1905.

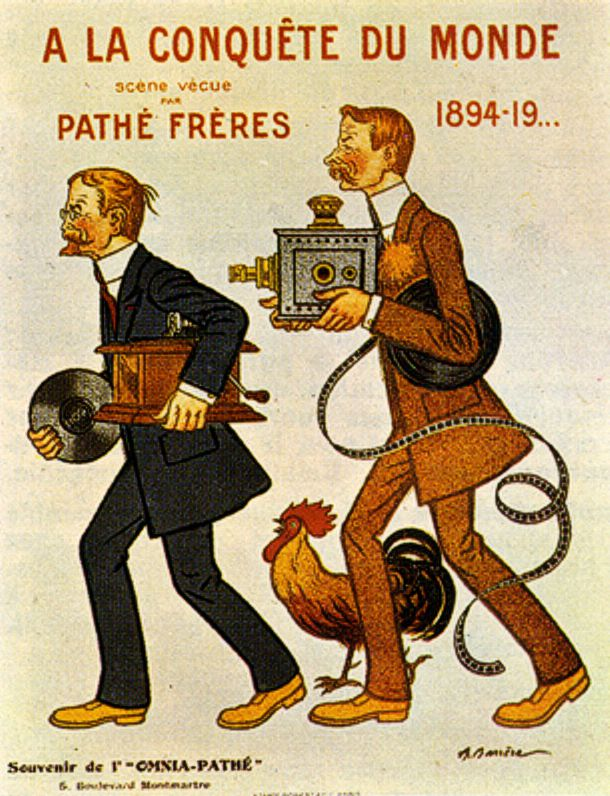
The Pathé Brothers, by Adrien Barrère.

The first successful permanent theatre showing only films was "The Nickelodeon", which was opened in Pittsburgh in 1905. By then, there were enough films several minutes long available to fill a program running for at least half an hour, and which could be changed weekly when the local audience became bored with it. Other exhibitors in the United States quickly followed suit, and within two years, there were 8,000 of these nickelodeons in operation across the United States. The American experience led to a worldwide boom in the production and exhibition of films from 1906 onwards.

Movie theaters became popular entertainment venues and social hubs in the early 20th century, much like cabarets and other theaters.

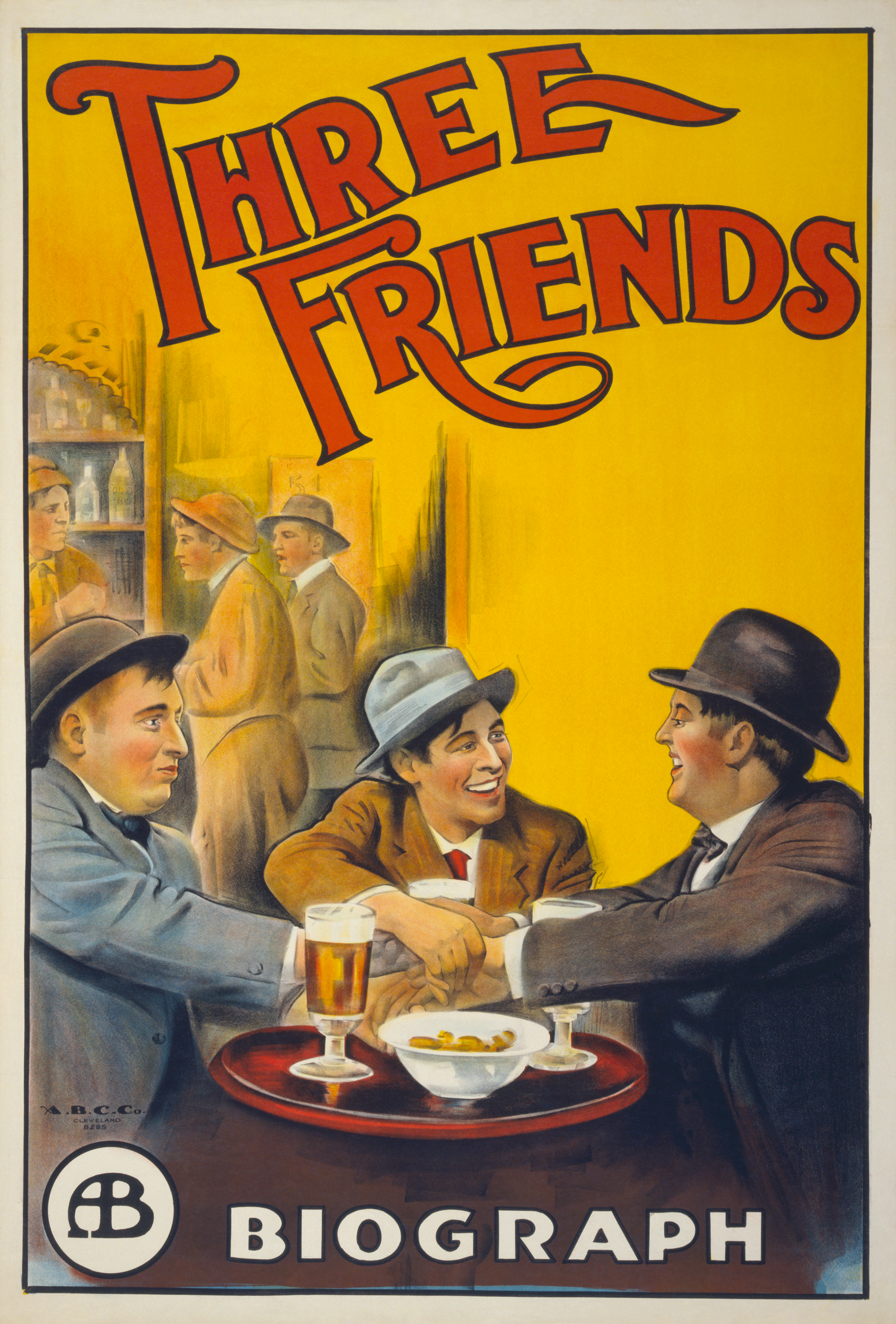
Poster for a Biograph Studios release from 1913

By 1907, purpose-built cinemas for motion pictures were being opened across the United States, Britain, and France. The films were often shown with the accompaniment of music provided by a pianist, though there could be more musicians. There were also very few larger cinemas in some of the biggest cities. Initially, the majority of films in the programs were Pathé films, but this changed fairly quickly as the American companies cranked up production. The program was made up of just a few films, and the show lasted around 30 minutes. The reel of film, of maximum length 1,000 feet (300 m), which usually contained one individual film, became the standard unit of film production and exhibition in this period. The program was changed twice or more a week but went up to five changes of program a week after a couple of years. In general, cinemas were set up in the established entertainment districts of the cities. In 1907, Pathé began renting their films to cinemas through film exchanges rather than selling the films outright.

The litigation over patents between all the major American film-making companies had continued, and at the end of 1908, they decided to pool their patents and form a trust to use them to control the American film business. The companies concerned were Pathé, Edison, Biograph, Vitagraph, Lubin, Selig, Essanay, Kalem, and the Kleine Optical Company, a major importer of European films. The George Eastman company, the only manufacturer of film stock in the United States, was also part of the combine, which was called the Motion Picture Patents Company (MPPC), and Eastman Kodak agreed to only supply the members with film stock. License fees for distributing and projecting films were extracted from all distributors and exhibitors. The producing companies that were part of the trust were allocated production quotas (two reels, i.e. films, a week for the biggest ones, one reel a week for the smaller ones), which were supposed to be enough to fill the programs of the licensed exhibitors. But the market was bigger than that, for although 6,000 exhibitors signed with the MPPC, about 2,000 others did not. A minority of the exchanges (i.e. distributors) stayed outside the MPPC, and in 1909 these independent exchanges immediately began to fund new film-producing companies. By 1911 there were enough independent and foreign films available to programme all the shows of the independent exhibitors, and in 1912 the independents had nearly half of the market. The MPPC had effectively been defeated in its plan to control the whole United States market, and the government antitrust action, which only now started against the MPPC, was not necessary to defeat it.

In the early 20th century, before Hollywood, the United States motion picture industry was mainly based in Fort Lee, New Jersey across the Hudson River from New York City. In need of a winter headquarters, moviemakers were attracted to Jacksonville, Florida due to its warm climate, exotic locations, excellent rail access, and cheaper labor, earning the city the title of "The Winter Film Capital of the World". New York-based Kalem Studios was the first to open a permanent studio in Jacksonville in 1908. over the next decade, more than 30 silent film companies established studios in town, including Metro Pictures (later MGM), Edison Studios, Majestic Films, King-Bee Film Company, Vim Comedy Company, Norman Studios, Gaumont Studios and the Lubin Manufacturing Company. The first motion picture made in Technicolor and the first feature-length color movie produced in the United States, The Gulf Between, was also filmed on location in Jacksonville in 1917.

Jacksonville was especially important to the African American film industry. One notable individual in this regard is the European American producer Richard Norman, who created a string of films starring black actors in the vein of Oscar Micheaux and the Lincoln Motion Picture Company. In contrast to the degrading parts offered in certain white films such as The Birth of a Nation, Norman and his contemporaries sought to create positive stories featuring African Americans in what he termed "splendidly assuming different roles".

Jacksonville's mostly conservative residents, however, objected to the hallmarks of the early movie industry, such as car chases in the streets, simulated bank robberies and fire alarms in public places, and even the occasional riot. In 1917, conservative Democrat John W. Martin was elected mayor on the platform of taming the city's movie industry. By that time, southern California was emerging as the major movie production center, thanks in large part to the move of film pioneers like William Selig and D.W. Griffith to the area. These factors quickly sealed the demise of Jacksonville as a major film destination.

Another factor for the industry's move west was that up until 1913, most American film production was still carried out around New York, but due to the monopoly of Thomas A. Edison, Inc.'s film patents and its litigious attempts to preserve it, many filmmakers moved to Southern California, starting with Selig in 1909. The sunshine and scenery was important for the production of Westerns, which came to form a major American film genre with the first cowboy stars, G.M. Anderson ("Broncho Billy") and Tom Mix. Selig pioneered the use of (fairly) wild animals from a zoo for a series of exotic adventures, with the actors being menaced or saved by the animals. Kalem Company sent film crews to places in America and abroad to film stories in the actual places they were supposed to have happened. Kalem also pioneered the female action heroine from 1912, with Ruth Roland playing starring roles in their Westerns.

In France, Pathé retained its dominant position, followed still by Gaumont, and then other new companies that appeared to cater to the film boom. A film company with a different approach was Film d'Art. Film d'Art was set up at the beginning of 1908 to make films of a serious artistic nature. Their declared program was to make films using only the best dramatists, artists, and actors. The first of these was L'Assassinat du Duc de Guise (The Assassination of the Duc de Guise), a historical subject set in the court of Henri III. This film used leading actors from the Comédie-Française and had a special accompanying score written by Camille Saint-Saëns. The other French majors followed suit, and this wave gave rise to the English-language description of films with artistic pretensions aimed at a sophisticated audience as "art films". By 1910, the French film companies were starting to make films as long as two, or even three reels, though most were still one reel long. This trend was followed in Italy, Denmark, and Sweden.

In Britain, the Cinematograph Act 1909 was the first primary legislation to specifically regulate the film industry. Film exhibitions often took place in temporary venues and the use of highly flammable cellulose nitrate for film, combined with limelight illumination, created a significant fire hazard. The Act specified a strict building code which required, amongst other things, that the projector be enclosed within a fire resisting enclosure.

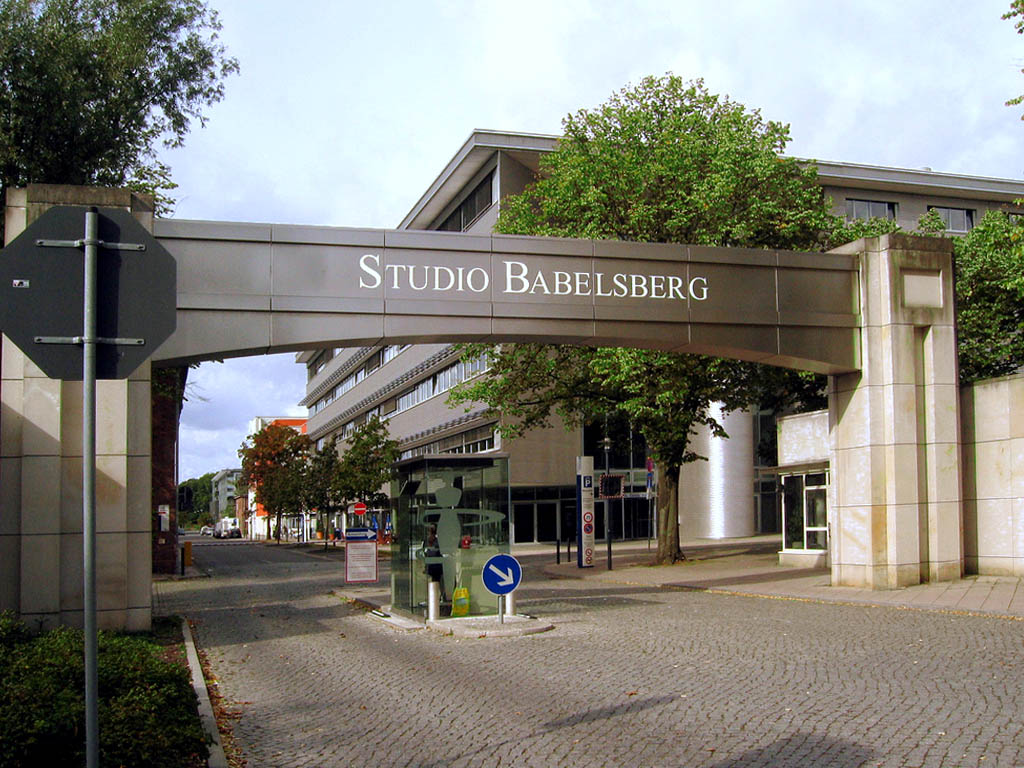
The Babelsberg Studio near Berlin was the first large-scale film studio in the world (founded 1912) and the forerunner to Hollywood. It still produces global blockbusters every year.

The Babelsberg Studio near Berlin in Germany was the first large-scale film studio in the world, founded in 1912, and the forerunner to Hollywood with its several establishments of large studios in the early 20th century.

=== Hollywood ===
The first movie studio in Hollywood area, Nestor Studios, was founded in 1911 by Al Christie for David Horsley. Other East Coast studios had already moved production to Los Angeles. Over time, Hollywood came to be so strongly associated with the film industry that the word "Hollywood" is now used colloquially to refer to the entire American film industry.

In 1913 Cecil B. DeMille, in association with Jesse Lasky, leased a barn with studio facilities in Hollywood where The Squaw Man (1914) was made. It is now the location of the Hollywood Heritage Museum.

The Charlie Chaplin Studios were built in 1917. The site was also used by Kling Studios, for the Superman TV series; Red Skelton, who used the sound stages for his CBS TV variety show; and CBS, which filmed the TV series Perry Mason there. From 1967 to 1999 it was the home of Herb Alpert's A&M Records and Tijuana Brass Enterprises. In 1969 The Los Angeles Cultural Heritage Board named it a historical cultural monument. In 2000 it became the home of the Jim Henson Company, home of the Muppets.

The noted Hollywood Sign originally read "Hollywoodland". It was erected in 1923 to advertise a new housing development in the hills above Hollywood. In 1949 the Hollywood Chamber of Commerce stepped in and removed the last four letters and repaired the others. It is a registered trademark and cannot be used without the permission of the Hollywood Chamber of Commerce.

The first Academy Awards presentation ceremony took place on 16 May 1929.

The period between the years 1927 (the effective end of the silent era) to 1948 is considered the age of the "Hollywood studio system", or the Golden Age of Hollywood. In a landmark 1948 court decision, the Supreme Court ruled that movie studios could not own theaters and play only the movies of their studio and movie stars; thus an era of Hollywood history ended.

=== Hindi cinema ===
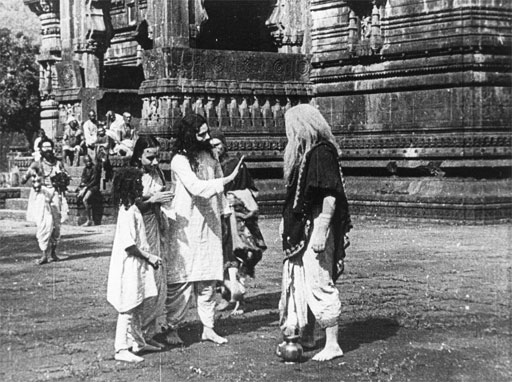
A shot from Raja Harishchandra (1913), the first film of Bollywood.

Bollywood is the Hindi-language film industry based in Mumbai (formerly known as Bombay), Maharashtra, India. The term is often incorrectly used to refer to the whole of Indian cinema; however, it is only a part of the total Indian film industry, which includes other production centers producing films in multiple languages. Bollywood is the largest film producer in India and one of the largest centers of film production in the world.

Bollywood is formally referred to as Hindi cinema. Linguistically, Bollywood films tend to use vernacular Hindustani, mutually intelligible to self-identified speakers of both Hindi and Urdu, while modern Bollywood films also increasingly incorporate elements of Hinglish.

The Wrestlers (1899) and The Man and His Monkeys (1899), directed and produced by Harischandra Sakharam Bhatawdekar (H. S. Bhatavdekar), were the first two films made by Indian filmmakers, which were both short films. He was also the first Indian filmmaker to direct and produce the first documentary and news relnews-relateditled The Landing of Sir M.M. Bhownuggree.

The 1930s and 1940s were tumultuous times: India was buffeted by the Great Depression, World War II, the Indian independence movement, and the violence of the Partition. Most Bollywood films were unabashedly escapist, but several filmmakers tackled tough social issues or used the struggle for Indian independence as a backdrop for their plots.

In 1937 Ardeshir Irani, of Alam Ara fame, made the first colour film in Hindi, Kisan Kanya. The next year, he made another color film, a version of Mother India.

Following India's independence, the period from the late 1940s to the early 1960s is regarded by film historians as the "Golden Age" of Hindi cinema. Defining key figures during this time included Raj Kapoor, Guru Dutt, Mehboob Khan, and Dilip Kumar.

The 1970s was when the name "Bollywood" was coined, and when the quintessential conventions of commercial Bollywood films were established. Key to this was the emergence of the masala film genre, which combines elements of multiple genres (action, comedy, romance, drama, melodrama, musical). The masala film was pioneered in the early 1970s by filmmaker Nasir Hussain, along with screenwriter duo Salim–Javed, pioneering the Bollywood blockbuster format.

Tollywood is the Bengali language Film Industry of India. Started by Royal Bioscope Company in 1898 by Hiralal Sen, along with Matilal Sen, Deboki Lal Sen, and Bholanath Gupta. Combining live theater performances of actors, the Bengali industry was notable for using sound as an important part of the drama in its Bioscope format whose cinematic language was extremely different from Western silent films. This was followed by Jamshedji Framji Madan of the Elphinstone Bioscope Company who also controlled Madan Theatre Company. J J Madan became managing director of Madan Theatres after the death of his father in 1923 and Madan Theatres reached a peak in the late 1920s when it owned 127 theaters and controlled half of the country's box office. Madan Theatres produced several popular and landmark films till 1937, parallel to works of '20s Bengali stars like Dhirendra Nath Ganguly who started the Indo-British Film Co. – the first Bengali-owned production company in 1918. The rise of the industry followed in the 1930s to 1940s when a diversity of films were made. Many prints were destroyed by fire. The prints and records of films from 1937 to 1947 films were majorly destroyed but this period in Bengal served as the age of political films in India which was supremely influential for the struggle for Indian Independence. After 1947, The industry saw a new era of creative studio-system collaborators who made films under the name of Agradoot. This saw a renaissance of commercial films and musicals where stars like Uttam Kumar and Suchitra Sen mesmerized the audience with their captivating screen presence and subdued performances. Ritwick Ghatak, Satyajit Ray, Tapan Sinha, Mrinal Sen, and Rituparno Ghosh were the other notable directors whose works influenced world cinema to an incomparable degree. The name of the industry was coined after the place Tollygunge, which also served as a cheeky tribute to Hollywood.

=== Cairo ===
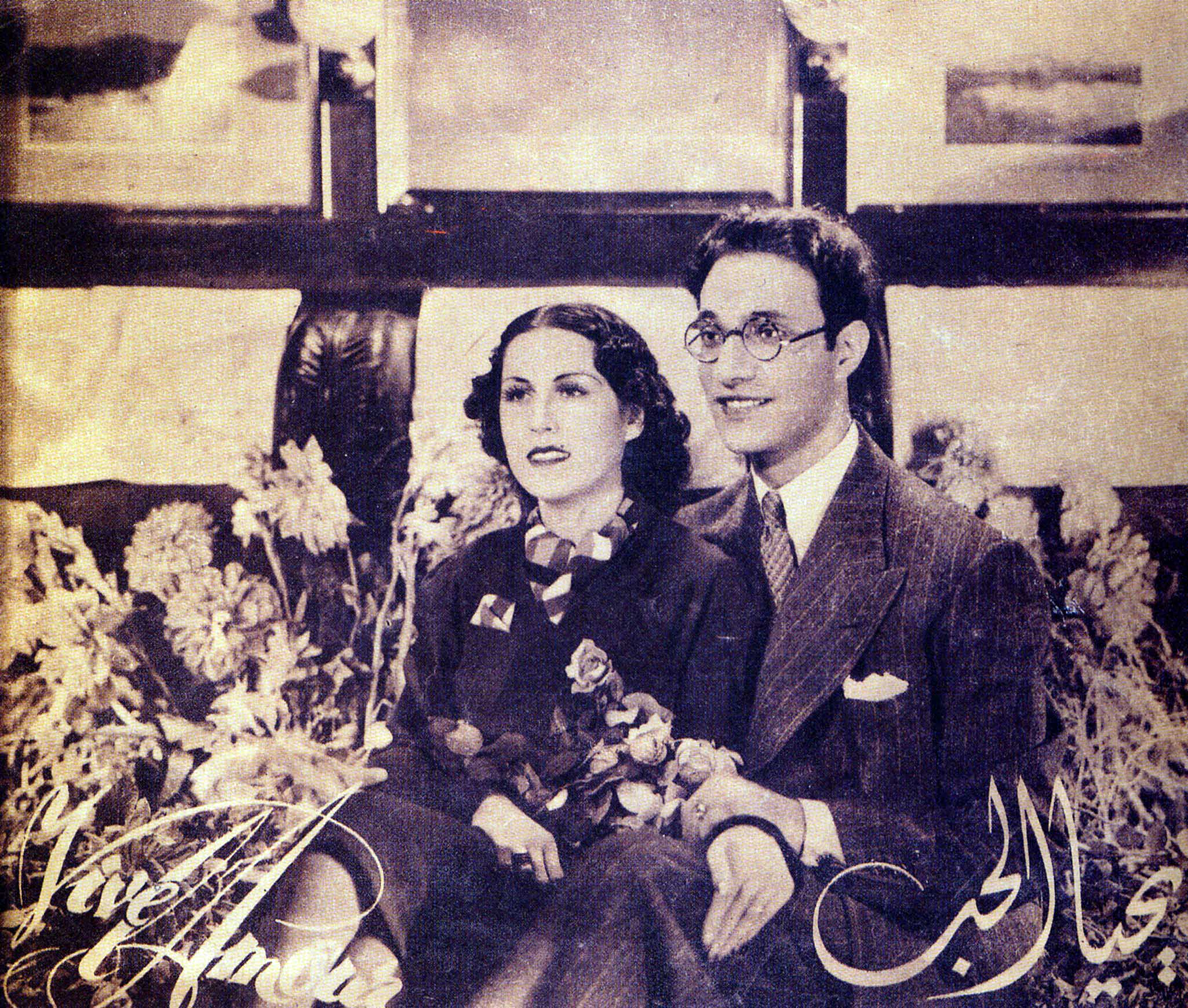
Publicity still for the Egyptian film Yahya el hub (1938)

The cinema of Egypt refers to the flourishing film industry based in Cairo which is known to be the Hollywood of the MENA region. In 1896, a limited number of silent films was made in Egypt beginning in 1896; 1927's Laila was notable as the first full-length feature. Cairo's film industry became a regional force with the coming of sound. Between 1930 and 1936, various small studios produced at least 44 feature films. In 1936, Studio Misr, financed by industrialist Talaat Harb, emerged as the leading Egyptian equivalent to Hollywood's major studios, a role the company retained for three decades.

Historians disagree in determining the beginning of cinema in Egypt. Some say in 1896 when the first film was watched in Egypt, while others date the beginning from 20 June 1907 with a short documentary film about the visit of Khedive Abbas Hilmi II to the Institute of Mursi Abul-Abbas in Alexandria. In 1917, the director Mohammed Karim established a production company in Alexandria. The company produced two films: Dead Flowers and Honor the Bedouin, which were shown in the city of Alexandria in early 1918.

Since 1976, the capital has held the annual Cairo International Film Festival, which has been accredited by the International Federation of Film Producers Associations. There is also another 12 festivals. Of the more than 4,000 short and feature-length films made in MENA region since 1908, more than three-quarters were Egyptian films.

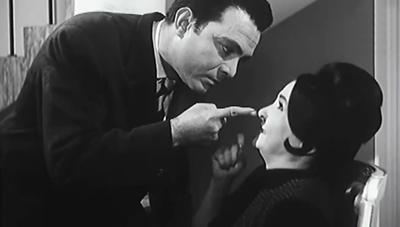
Publicity still for the Egyptian film My Wife, the Director General (1966)

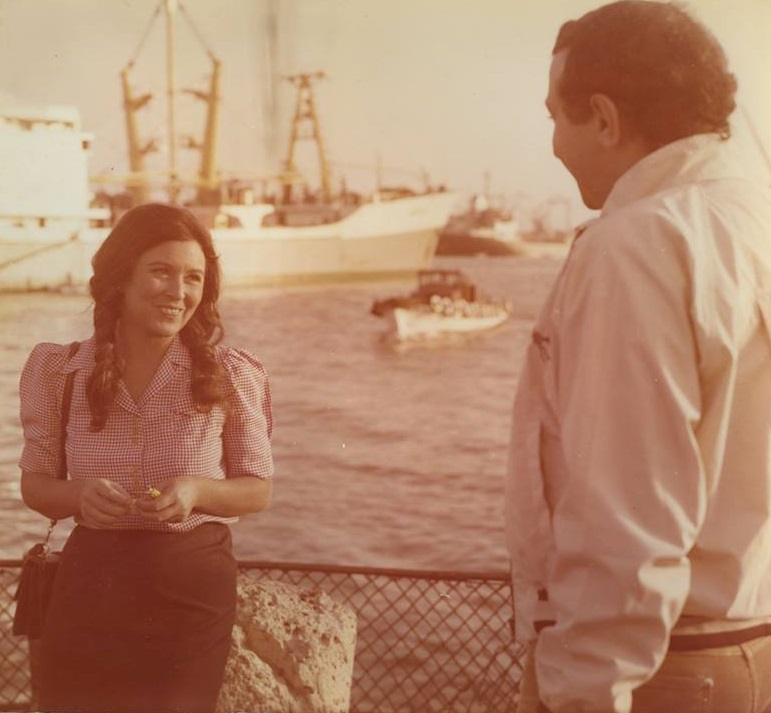
Soad Hosny and Nour El-Sherif in People on the Top (1981)

Egyptian films are typically spoken in the Egyptian Arabic dialect. Since then, more than 4,000 films have been produced in Egypt, three-quarters of the total Arab production. Historian Samir Kassir notes (2004) that Misr Studios in particular, "despite their ups and downs, were to make Cairo the third capital of the world's film industry, after Hollywood and Bombay but ahead of Italy's Cinecittà." Egypt is the most productive country in the Middle East in the field of film production, and the one with the most developed media system.

=== Nollywood ===
Nollywood is a sobriquet that originally referred to the Nigerian film industry. The origin of the term dates back to the early 2000s, traced to an article in The New York Times. Due to the history of evolving meanings and contexts, there is no clear or agreed-upon definition for the term, which has made it a subject of several controversies. The origin of the term "Nollywood" remains unclear; Jonathan Haynes traced the earliest usage of the word to a 2002 article by Matt Steinglass in the New York Times, where it was used to describe Nigerian cinema. Charles Igwe noted that Norimitsu Onishi also used the name in a September 2002 article he wrote for the New York Times. The term continues to be used in the media to refer to the Nigerian film industry, with its definition later assumed to be a portmanteau of the words "Nigeria" and "Hollywood", the American major film hub.

The definition of which films are considered Nollywood has always been a subject of debate. Alex Eyengho defined Nollywood as "the totality of activities taking place in the Nigerian film industry, be it in English, Yoruba, Hausa, Igbo, Itsekiri, Edo, Efik, Ijaw, Urhobo or any other of the over 300 Nigerian languages". He further stated that "the historical trajectory of Nollywood started since the pre and post independent Nigeria, with the theatrical (stage) and cinematic (celluloid) efforts of the likes of Chief Hubert Ogunde, Chief Amata, Baba Sala, Ade Love, Eddie Ugbomah and a few others". The Influence of the Nigerian movie industry often referred to informally as Nollywood has influenced all African countries.

By the end of 2013, the film industry reportedly hit a record-breaking revenue of ₦1.72 trillion (US$4.1 billion). As of 2014, the industry was worth ₦853.9 billion (US$5.1 billion), making it the third most valuable film industry in the world behind the United States and India. It made up about 1.4% of Nigeria's GDP; this was attributed to the increase in the number of quality films produced and more formal distribution methods.

== Economics ==
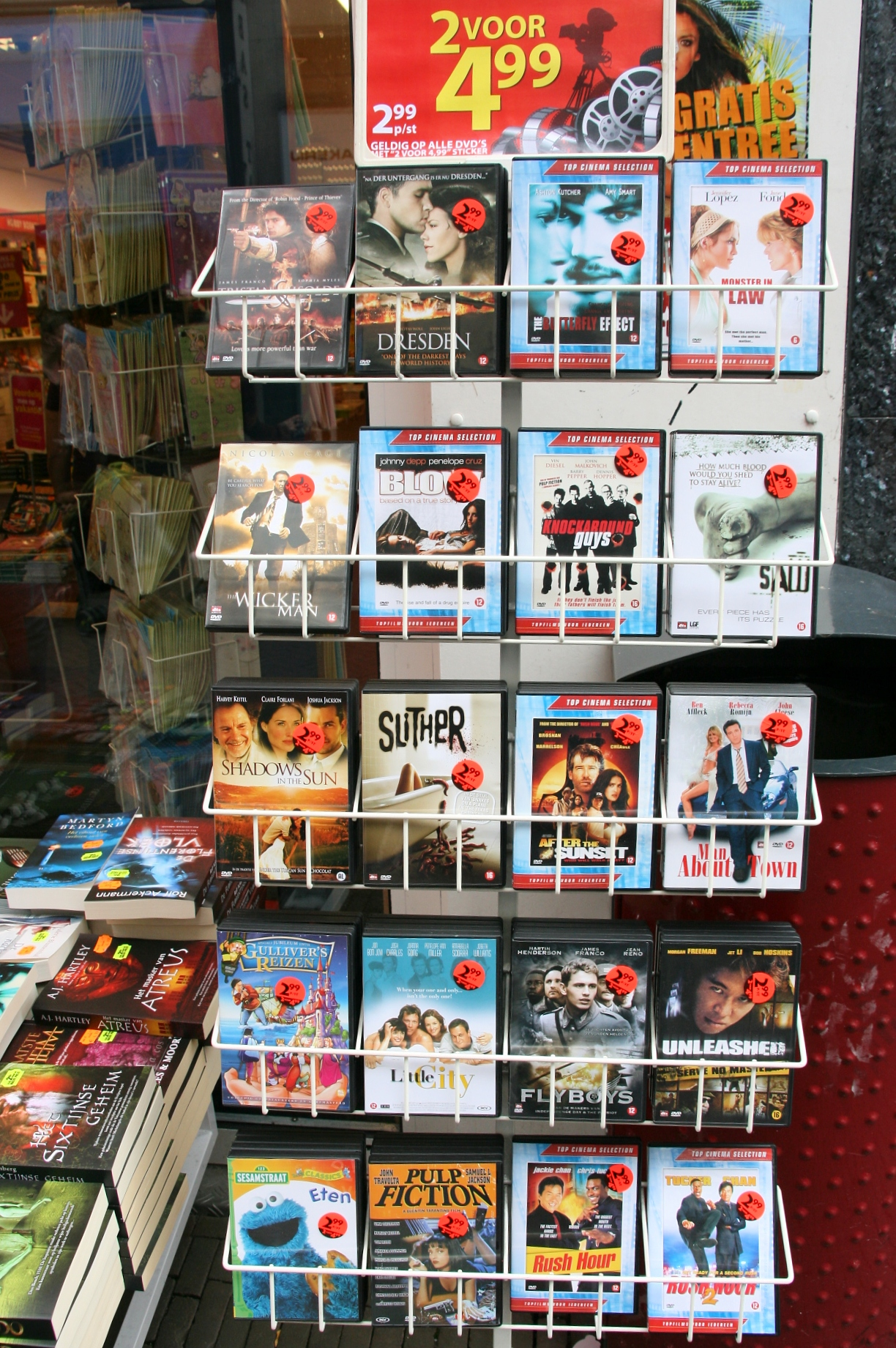
Discounted DVD home video film releases sold in the Netherlands

The profitability of a film studio is crucially dependent on picking the right film projects and involving the right management and creative teams (cast, direction, visual design, score, photography, costume, set design, editing, and many additional specialties), but it also depends heavily on choosing the right scale and approach to film promotion, control over receipts through technologies such as digital rights management (DRM), sophisticated accounting practices, and management of ancillary revenue streams; in the extreme, for a major media franchise centered on film, the film might itself be only one large component of many large contributions to total franchise revenue.

The film industry is a winner-take-all market shaped by highly volatile, nonlinear dynamics: box office revenue and market share are both among a small number of successful films and the studios that produce them. Which films or studios will dominate at any given time is difficult to predict, and market leaders "change places dramatically and often".

== Statistics ==
Theater ticket sales revenue has declined since the mid-2010s. Theater revenue did not fully recover from declines during the COVID-19 pandemic when many theaters were closed.

=== Countries with largest number of film productions ===
The following is a list of the top countries by the number of feature films produced.

Rank	Country	Films	Year	Ref
1	India	1,691	2022	
2	United States	1,361	2022	
3	Mexico	1,289	2022	
4	Japan	634	2022	
5	Spain	320	2022	
6	France	287	2022	
7	Italy	273	2022	
8	Indonesia	241	2024	
9	United Kingdom	220	2022	
10	Germany	192	2022	
11	China	174	2022	
12	Brazil	173	2022	
13	South Korea	106	2022	
14	Bangladesh	60	2022	

=== Largest markets by box office revenue ===
The following countries are the largest box office markets in terms of the gross box office revenue, according to the THEME Report 2022 by the MPA (Motion Picture Association).

Rank	Market	Revenue (US$)	Year
1	United States and Canada	$8,870,000,000	2025
2	Europe	$8,200,000,000	2024
3	China	$7,400,000,000	2025
4	India	$1,360,000,000	2024
5	France	$1,360,000,000	2024
6	Japan	$1,300,000,000	2024
7	United Kingdom and (Republic of Ireland) Ireland	$1,260,000,000	2024
8	Germany	$1,010,000,000	2023
9	South Korea	$970,000,000	2023
10	Mexico	$940,000,000	2023
11	Australia	$670,000,000	2023
12	Italy	$550,000,000	2023
13	Spain	$540,000,000	2023
	Worldwide	$33,500,000,000	2025

=== Largest markets by box office admissions ===
The following countries are the largest box office markets in terms of the number of tickets sold in 2022.

Rank	Country	Admissions (ticket sales)	Ref	Average ticket price (US$)
1	India	981,000,000		$3.61
2	China	709,000,000		$6.95
3	United States	699,000,000		$14.00
4	Mexico	182,000,000		$5.06
5	Japan	153,000,000		$12.54
6	France	148,000,000		$13.04
7	South Korea	135,000,000		$10.45
8	United Kingdom	131,000,000		$12.71
9	Brazil	111,000,000		$6.96
10	Indonesia	99,000,000		$3.18

=== Average ticket price ===
The average ticket price (ATP) is the average cost to purchase a film ticket at the box office in any given year. According to the UNESCO Institute for Statistics, the ATP is "calculated as the total revenues generated from tickets sales divided by the number of feature film tickets sold during the year of reference."

Year	Worldwide (US$)	US	UK	Australia	China	EU	France	Hong Kong	India	Japan	UAE	USSR
1950			£0.08 ($0.22)									1.75 Rbls ($0.33)
1951		$0.53	£0.08 ($0.22)									
1952			£0.08 ($0.22)									
1953		$0.60	£0.08 ($0.22)									
1954		$0.45	£0.09 ($0.25)									
1955			£0.09 ($0.25)					HK$0.95		¥63 ($0.18)		
1956		$0.50	£0.09 ($0.25)				1.22 F ($0.35)			¥62 ($0.17)		
1957			£0.10 ($0.28)				1.33 F ($0.37)			¥62 ($0.17)		
1958			£0.11 ($0.31)							¥64 ($0.18)		
1959		$0.51	£0.12 ($0.34)							¥65 ($0.18)		
1960			£0.13 ($0.36)						₹1.35 ($0.28)	¥72 ($0.20)		
1961		$0.69	£0.13 ($0.36)						₹1.35 ($0.28)	¥85 ($0.24)		
1962		$0.70	£0.14 ($0.39)						₹1.35 ($0.28)	¥115 ($0.32)		
1963		$0.85	£0.15 ($0.42)						₹1.44 ($0.30)	¥152 ($0.42)		0.25 руб ($0.28)
1964		$0.93	£0.17 ($0.48)						₹1.45 ($0.30)	¥178 ($0.49)		0.25 руб ($0.28)
1965		$1.01	£0.19 ($0.53)				3.04 F ($0.62)		₹1.46 ($0.31)	¥203 ($0.56)		0.25 руб ($0.28)
1966		$1.09	£0.24 ($0.67)				3.34 F ($0.68)		₹1.66 ($0.26)	¥219 ($0.61)		0.25 руб ($0.28)
1967		$1.20	£0.22 ($0.61)						₹1.66 ($0.22)	¥236 ($0.66)		0.25 руб ($0.28)
1968		$1.31	£0.24 ($0.58)					HK$1.98 (US$0.33)	₹1.67 ($0.22)	¥262 ($0.73)		
1969		$1.42	£0.27 ($0.65)						₹1.67 ($0.22)	¥295 ($0.82)		
1970		$1.55	£0.31 ($0.74)						₹1.89 (US$0.25)	¥324 ($0.90)		
1971		$1.65	£0.34 ($0.83)						₹1.89 (US$0.25)	¥366 ($1.04)		
1972		$1.70	£0.38 ($0.95)						₹1.96 (US$0.26)	¥411 ($1.36)		
1973		$1.77	£0.43 ($1.05)						₹2.06 (US$0.27)	¥500 ($1.84)		$0.47
1974		$1.87	£0.50 ($1.17)					HK$6 (US$1.19)	₹2.38 (US$0.3)	¥631 ($2.16)		$0.47
1975		$2.05	£0.61 ($1.35)						₹2.40 ($0.29)	¥751 ($2.53)		$0.47
1976		$2.13	£0.73 ($1.31)	A$3.30					₹2.47 (US$0.27)	¥852 ($2.87)		
1977		$2.23	£0.83 ($1.45)	A$3.50				HK$5.33 (US$1.14)	₹2.52 (US$0.29)	¥923 ($3.44)		
1978		$2.34	£0.94 ($1.80)	A$3.50					₹2.55 (US$0.31)	¥967 ($4.60)		
1979		$2.51	£1.13 ($2.39)	A$3.70	¥0.2 ($0.13)				₹2.76 (US$0.34)	¥958 ($4.37)		
1980		$2.69	£1.42 ($3.30)	A$4.00	¥0.2 ($0.13)	€1.90 ($2.56)	€2.70 ($3.64)	HK$9 (US$1.81)	₹2.92 (US$0.37)	¥1,009 ($4.45)		
1981		$2.78	£1.58 ($3.17)	A$4.50	¥0.2 ($0.12)				₹3.31 (US$0.38)	¥1,093 ($4.96)		
1982		$2.94	£1.67 ($2.92)	A$5.00	¥0.2 ($0.11)			HK$12 (US$1.98)	₹4.21 (US$0.44)	¥1,092 ($4.38)		0.50 руб ($0.72)
1983		$3.15	£1.90 ($2.88)	A$5.60	¥0.2 ($0.10)			HK$15 (US$2.06)	₹4.21 (US$0.42)	¥1,093 ($4.60)		
1984		$3.36	£1.91 ($2.54)	A$5.40	¥0.2 ($0.09)			HK$15 (US$1.92)	₹4.21 (US$0.37)	¥1,144 ($4.82)		
1985		$3.55	£1.71 ($2.19)	A$5.40		€3.10 ($2.27)	€3.70 ($2.71)		₹4.38 (US$0.35)	¥1,118 ($4.69)		
1986		$3.71	£1.88 ($2.76)	A$5.31					₹4.24 (US$0.34)	¥1,116 ($6.62)		
1987		$3.91	£2.15 ($3.51)	A$6.16					₹7 (US$0.54)	¥1,120 ($7.74)		
1988		$4.11	£2.30 ($4.09)	A$6.10	¥0.3 ($0.08)			HK$15 (US$1.92)		¥1,118 ($8.72)		
1989		$3.97	£2.33 ($3.81)	A$6.60				HK$30 (US$3.85)		¥1,161 ($8.42)		
1990		$4.23	£2.81 ($4.99)	A$6.61		€4.20 ($5.32)	€4.50 ($5.71)			¥1,177 ($8.13)		
1991		$4.21	£3.03 ($5.34)	A$6.95						¥1,181 ($8.77)		
1992		$4.15	£3.21 ($5.63)	A$7.09				HK$32 (US$4.24)		¥1,210 ($9.55)		
1993		$4.14	£3.21 ($4.81)	A$7.00					₹8.45 (US$0.27)	¥1,252 ($11.26)		
1994		$4.18	£3.25 ($4.97)	A$7.00	¥7.5 ($0.89)				₹11.05 (US$0.35)	¥1,249 ($12.22)		
1995		$4.35	£3.48 ($5.49)	A$7.17	¥7.5 ($0.89)	€4.70 ($6.26)	€5.30 ($7.06)	HK$48.9 (US$6.32)	₹14.37 (US$0.44)	¥1,243 ($13.21)		
1996		$4.42	£3.70 ($5.77)	A$7.26		€4.80 ($6.19)	€5.40 ($6.97)	US$6.25	₹15.70 (US$0.44)	¥1,245 ($11.45)		
1997		$4.59	£4.07 ($6.66)	A$7.47	$0.84	€5.00 ($5.65)	€5.30 ($5.99)	US$6.47	₹17.92 (US$0.49)	¥1,259 ($10.41)		
1998		$4.69	£4.03 ($6.67)	A$7.87	$0.84	€5.10 ($5.68)	€5.30 ($5.90)	US$6.25	₹19.66 (US$0.48)	¥1,264 ($9.66)		
1999		$5.08	£4.21 ($6.81)	A$7.93		€5.30 ($5.64)	€5.40 ($5.75)	US$6.25	₹21.51 ($0.50)	¥1,263 ($11.09)		
2000		$5.39	£4.40 ($6.66)	A$8.39	¥5 ($0.60)	€5.40 ($4.97)	€5.40 ($4.97)		₹24.07 (US$0.54)	¥1,262 ($11.71)		
2001		$5.66	£4.14 ($5.96)	A$8.78 (US$4.54)		€5.60 ($5.01)	€5.50 ($4.83)	HK$55 (US$7.05)	₹26.66 (US$0.57)	¥1,226 ($10.09)	Dh 30	
2002		$5.81	£4.29 ($6.43)	A$9.13				HK$55 (US$7.05)	₹29.98 (US$0.62)	¥1,224 ($9.76)	Dh 30	
2003		$6.03	£4.44 ($7.25)	A$9.64					₹35.77 (US$0.77)	¥1,252 ($10.8)	Dh 30	
2004		$6.21	£4.49 ($8.22)	A$9.92					₹42.14 (US$0.93)	¥1,240 ($11.46)	Dh 30	
2005		$6.41	£4.71 ($8.56)	A$9.94	¥12.7 ($1.55)		€5.90 ($7.33)		₹49.16 (US$1.11)	¥1,235 ($11.21)	Dh 30	
2006		$6.55	£4.87 ($8.96)	A$10.37	¥14.9 ($1.87)		€5.90 ($7.40)	US$7	₹53.91 (US$1.19)	¥1,233 ($10.60)	Dh 30	
2007		$6.88	£5.05 ($10.10)	A$10.57	¥16.9 ($2.22)		€5.90 ($8.07)	US$6.70	₹60.73 (US$1.47)	¥1,216 ($10.33)	Dh 35 ($7.90)	
2008		$7.18	£5.20 ($9.56)	A$11.17	¥20.1 ($2.89)		€6 ($8.82)	US$7	₹69.76 ($1.60)	¥1,214 ($11.75)	$8.40	
2009		$7.50	£5.44 ($8.47)	A$11.99	¥23.5 ($3.44)		€6.14	US$7.30	₹78.63 (US$1.62)	¥1,217 ($13.01)	$5.30	
2010		$7.89	£5.95 ($9.19)	A$12.26	¥35.1 ($5.18)		€6.33	US$7.70	₹88.60 (US$1.94)	¥1,266 ($14.42)	$7.20	
2011		$7.93	£6.06 ($9.71)	A$12.87	¥35.4 ($5.48)		€6.33		₹95.48 ($2.05)	¥1,252 ($15.69)	$8.80	
2012		$7.96	£6.37 ($10.06)	A$13.10	¥36.3 ($5.75)		€6.42	US$8.10	₹101.74	¥1,258 ($15.77)	$11	
2013		$8.13	£6.53 ($10.210)	A$13.41	¥35.6 ($5.75)		€6.46	US$8.40	₹109.75	¥1,246	$11.30	
2014	$4.74	$8.17	£6.72 ($13.30)	A$13.68	¥35.7 ($5.81)		€6.38 ($12.29)	US$8.50	₹117.89 ($3.22)	¥1,285 ($17.67)		
2015	$4.86	$8.43	£7.21	A$13.60	¥35		€6.48	US$10.70	₹125.97	¥1,303	$11.60	
2016	$4.99	$8.65	£7.41	A$13.80	¥35		€6.51	US$9.80	₹131.57	¥1,307		
2017	$5.11	$8.97	£7.49	A$14.13	¥34.5		€6.60		₹134.38	¥1,310		
2018	$5.16	$9.11	£7.22	A$13.86	¥35.3					¥1,315		
2019		$9.01	£7.11	A$14.50	¥37.1					¥1,340		
2020		$9.37	£6.75	A$14.23	¥37					¥1,350		
2021			£7.52	A$15.24	¥40.3 ($6.25)					¥1,410		
2022			£7.69	A$16.26	¥42.1					¥1,402		

=== Distributor rentals ===
Box-office figures are reported in the form of either gross receipts or distributor rentals, the latter being especially true of older films. Commonly mistaken for home video revenue, the rentals are the distributor's share of the film's theatrical revenue i.e. the box office gross less the exhibitor's cut. Historically, the rental price averaged at 30–40% when the distributors owned the theater chains, equating to just over a third of the gross being paid to the distributor of the film. As of 1997 rental fees varied greatly, depending on a number of factors, with films from the major studios averaging 43% of gross receipts.

Annual rentals % of box office gross receipts
Year	United States	United States and Canada	Japan
1939	36.4%	—N/a	—N/a
1955	—N/a	—N/a	58.4%
1956	—N/a	—N/a	56.3%
1957	—N/a	—N/a	55.2%
1958	—N/a	—N/a	54.5%
1959	—N/a	—N/a	55.0%
1960	—N/a	—N/a	54.6%
1961	—N/a	—N/a	53.2%
1962	—N/a	—N/a	50.1%
1963	—N/a	—N/a	47.2%
1964	—N/a	—N/a	44.6%
1965	27.6%	29.8%	44.7%
1966	—N/a	—N/a	42.2%
1967	—N/a	—N/a	40.9%
1968	—N/a	—N/a	40.2%
1969	—N/a	—N/a	39.9%
1970	26.7%	28.6%	37.7%
1971	—N/a	—N/a	38.4%
1972	—N/a	—N/a	37.3%
1973	—N/a	—N/a	38.0%
1974	—N/a	—N/a	38.0%
1975	29.7%	32.7%	39.4%
1976	28.3%	31.3%	39.0%
1977	36.6%	39.4%	39.9%
1978	42.4%	45.3%	41.2%
1979	37.8%	40.5%	39.0%
1980	43.0%	46.4%	38.2%
1981	39.2%	42.2%	37.9%
1982	38.9%	41.8%	38.5%
1983	34.5%	37.0%	42.3%
1984	32.6%	35.3%	39.6%
1985	29.6%	31.6%	40.0%
1986	30.7%	33.1%	40.5%
1987	29.3%	31.5%	39.5%
1988	31.7%	34.5%	40.5%
1989	35.4%	38.4%	40.3%
1990	36.4%	39.4%	41.3%
1991	38.5%	41.3%	40.7%
1992	41.2%	43.8%	41.0%
1993	38.8%	41.3%	43.9%
1994	37.8%	40.2%	41.8%
1995	43.6%	45.6%	43.4%
1996	40.9%	43.4%	42.5%
1997	41.5%	44.2%	44.3%
1998	40.1%	42.6%	45.1%
1999	41.9%	44.7%	45.3%
2000	37.2%	39.7%	—N/a

== Criticism ==
=== Censorship ===
Economic censorship happens when a company, industry, or country takes steps to ensure profitability, usually by self-censoring content to please the group wielding their economic influence. That group can be political such as the boycott of individuals or the banning or taxing by governments of certain products. This tool tends to have a broader reach beyond the borders of a government than pure political censorship. Examples include Hollywood self-censoring any negative depictions of Nazis for most of the 1930s to maintain access to German audiences and avoid upsetting anti-semites at home, or major studios self-censoring any negative depictions of China or its ruling party after 1997 to maintain access to Chinese audiences.

=== Covert advertising ===
Native advertising is information designed to persuade in more subtle ways than classic propaganda. A modern example common in the United States is copaganda, in which TV shows display unrealistically flattering portrayals of law enforcement, in part to borrow equipment and get their assistance in blocking off streets to more easily film on location. Other reputation laundering accusations have been leveled in the entertainment industry, including the burnishing the image of Mafia's Godfathers.

Product placement also has been a point of criticism, with the tobacco industry promoting smoking on screen. The Centers for Disease Control cites that 51% of teen smokers would not start smoking if films with smoking were automatically given an 'R' rating, which would save one million lives.

== See also ==
- List of cinema of the world
- List of entertainment industry dynasties
- Independent film
- Outline of film
- Television

== Bibliography ==
- Allen J. Scott (2005) On Hollywood: The Place The Industry, Princeton University Press
- Robertson, Patrick (1988) The Guinness Book of Movie Facts & Feats. London: Guinness Publishing Limited
- Arnab Jan Deka (27 October 1996) Fathers of Indian Cinema Bhatawdekar and Torney, Dainik Asam
- Sanjit Narwekar (1995) Marathi Cinema : In Retrospect, Maharashtra Film, Stage & Cultural Development Corporation Ltd
- Firoze Rangoonwalla (1979) A Pictorial History of Indian Cinema, The Hamlyn Publishing Group Limited
- Barkin, Jordan. 25 April 2021. "When you enjoy Oscar Night, America Wins". USA Today.
