= The Grasshopper and the Ant (1913 film) =

- Film poster
- Russian: Стрекоза и муравей
- Directed by: Ladislas Starevich
- Written by: Ladislas Starevich
- Color process: Black and white
- Release date: 1913
- Running time: 4 minutes and 49 seconds
- Country: Russian Empire
- Language: Silent

The Grasshopper and the Ant (1913)

The Grasshopper and the Ant (Russian: Стрекоза и муравей) is a 1913 Russian silent short animated film directed and written by Ladislas Starevich. The film is based on the classic fable by the same name by the Greek fabulist Aesop as adapted by I. Krylov. A copy of the film was presented to Alexei Nikolaevich, Tsarevich of Russia as a gift.

Though the Russian title literally translates to "The Dragonfly and the Ant", the insect depicted is a grasshopper; the word "стрекоза" was used for both species in the 19th century, when Krylov's adaptation was published.

== Plot ==
The Ant is hard at work gathering food on a wheelbarrow, while the Grasshopper does nothing but play the fiddle, dance, and drink with its friend the Stag Beetle. At one point the Grasshopper even kicks the Ant away as it passes by the Grasshopper's table.

Winter comes and the Grasshopper and the Stag Beetle have nowhere to go nor anything to eat. The Stag Beetle dies. The Grasshopper begs the Ant to take it in and feed it, "just until spring". The Ant merely replies that when the Grasshopper is done crying, it can go dance some more. The Ant closes the door on the Grasshopper, who eventually dies from cold and hunger.
