= La Reine des Papillons =

- Directed by: Ladislas Starevich
- Written by: Ladislas Starevich
- Starring: Nina Star
- Release date: 1927
- Running time: 23 minutes
- Country: France
- Languages: Silent film French intertitles

La Reine des Papillons (French for The Queen of the Butterflies) is a 1927 French stop-motion animated short film created by Ladislas Starevich. The film combines live-action sequences starring his daughter Jeanne (aka Nina Star) with puppet animation. Full of special effects, as with Starevich's previous films he used deceased insects as the protagonists of the film.

== Synopsis ==
A little girl working as a carnival dancer is given a gift of a caterpillar as a joke. She spares the caterpillar's life, and becomes the Queen of the Butterflies.

== Cast ==
- Nina Star as the Queen of the Butterflies

== DVD release ==
The film was released on DVD in 2013 by Doriane Films alongside four of Starevich's other films that also star Nina.
