= Ladislas Starevich =

Polish-Russian stop-motion animator (1882–1965)

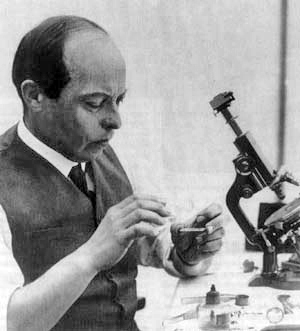
- Born: Władysław Starewicz; August 8, 1882; Moscow, Russian Empire
- Died: February 26, 1965 (aged 82); Fontenay-sous-Bois, France
- Occupations: Film director, stop motion animator

Ladislas Starevich (Russian: Владислав Александрович Старевич; Polish: Władysław Starewicz; August 8, 1882 – February 26, 1965) was a Polish-Russian stop-motion animator notable as the author of what was long believed to be the first puppet-animated film The Beautiful Leukanida (1912). Newer research attributes dancer and choreographer Alexander Shiryaev with the first puppet-animations (ca.1906). Starevich also used dead insects and other animals as protagonists of his films. Following the Russian Revolution, Starevich settled in France.

== Early career ==
The Cameraman's Revenge (1912)

The Grasshopper and the Ant (1913)

Władysław Starewicz was born in Moscow to ethnic Polish parents from present-day Lithuania. His father, Aleksander Starewicz, was from Surviliškis near Kėdainiai and his mother, Antonina Legęcka, from Kaunas. Both belonged to lesser nobility and were in hiding after the failed January Uprising against the Tsarist Russian domination. Due to his mother's death, he was raised by his grandmother in Kaunas, then the capital of Kaunas Governorate within the Russian Empire. He attended Gymnasium in Dorpat (today Tartu, Estonia), where he worked painting postcards and illustrations for local magazines. Starewicz pursued an artistic career despite the protest of his family, and enrolled in a painting school.

Starewicz had interests in a number of different areas; by 1910 he had been named Director of the Museum of Natural History in Kaunas, Kovno Governorate (now Lithuania). There he made four short live-action documentaries for the museum. For the fifth film, Starewicz wished to record the battle of two stag beetles, but was stymied by the fact that the nocturnal creatures stopped moving or died due to the heat whenever the stage lighting was turned on. Inspired by a viewing of Les allumettes animées [Animated Matches] (1908) by Arthur Melbourne Cooper, Starewicz decided to re-create the fight through stop-motion animation: by replacing the beetles' legs with wire, attached with sealing wax to their thorax, he is able to create articulated insect puppets. The result was the short film Lucanus Cervus (1910), apparently the first animated puppet film and the natal hour of Russian animation.

In 1911, Starewicz moved to Moscow and began work with the film company of Aleksandr Khanzhonkov. There he made two dozen films, most of them puppet animations using dead animals. Of these, The Beautiful Leukanida (1912; the first puppet film with a plot), inspired in the story of Agamemnon and Menelaus, earned international acclaim (one British reviewer thought the stars were live trained insects), while The Grasshopper and the Ant (1913) got Starewicz decorated by the czar. But the best-known film of this period was The Cameraman's Revenge (1912), a cynical work about infidelity and jealousy among the insects. Some of the films made for Khanzhonkov feature live-action/animation interaction. In some cases, the live action consisted of footage of Starewicz's daughter Irina. Particularly worthy of note is Starevich's 41-minute 1913 film The Night Before Christmas, an adaptation of the Nikolai Gogol story of the same name. The 1913 film Terrible Vengeance won the Gold Medal at an international festival in Milan in 1914, being just one of five films which won awards among 1005 contestants.

During World War I, Starewicz worked for several film companies, directing 60 live-action features, some of which were fairly successful. After the October Revolution of 1917, the film community largely sided with the White Army and moved from Moscow to Yalta on the Black Sea. After a brief stay, Starewicz and his family fled before the Red Army could capture the Crimea, stopping in Italy for a while before joining other émigrés in Paris.

== After World War I ==
At this time, Władysław Starewicz changed his name to Ladislas Starevich, as it was easier to pronounce in French. He first established his family in Joinville-le-Pont, while he worked as a cameraman there. He rapidly returned to make puppet films. He made Le mariage de Babylas (Midnight Wedding), L'épouvantail (The Scarecrow, 1921 ), Les grenouilles qui demandent un roi (alternately called Frogland and The Frogs Who Wanted a King, 1922), Amour noir et blanc (Love in Black and White, 1923), La voix du rossignol (The Voice of the Nightingale, 1923) and La petite chateuse des rues (The Little Street Singer, 1924). His family worked with him to produce these films. These were his daughter Irina (who had changed her name to Irène) who collaborated in all his films and defended his rights, his wife Anna Zimermann, who made the costumes for the puppets and Jeanne Starewitch (aka Nina Star) who acted in some of the films (The Little Street Singer, The Queen of the Butterflies, The Voice of the Nightingale, The Magical clock, and others)

In 1924, Starevich moved to Fontenay-sous-Bois, where he lived until his death in 1965. There he made the rest of his films. Among the most notable are The Eyes of the Dragon (1925), a Chinese tale with complex and wonderful sets and character design, in which Starevich shows his talent as an artist and in set decoration as well as ingenious trick photography, The Town Rat and the Country Rat (1927), a parody of American slapstick films, The Magical Clock (1928), a fairy tale with amazing middle-age puppets and sets, starring Nina Star with music by Paul Dessau, The Little Parade, from Hans Christian Andersen's tale The Steadfast Tin Soldier. Six weeks after the premiere of The Little Parade, sound was added by Louis Nalpas' company. Starevich started a collaboration with him, wishing to make a feature full-length film: Le Roman de Renard. All his 1920s films are available on DVD.

== Le Roman de Renard ==
Often mentioned as being among his best work, The Tale of the Fox (French: Le Roman de Renard; German: Reinicke Fuchs) was also his first animated feature. It was entirely made by Starevich and his daughter, Irène. Production took place in Fontenay-sous-Bois from 1929 to 1930. When the film was ready, the producer, Louis Nalpas, decided to add sound using disc support but this system failed and the film was not released. The German film studio UFA became interested in showing the film in two parts. Sound was added in German and it premiered in Berlin in 1937. Later, in 1941, Roger Richebé (Paris Cinéma Location) produced a French sound version, which premiered in April 1941. It was the third animated feature film to have sound, after Quirino Cristiani's Peludópolis (1931) and The New Gulliver (1935) from the Soviet Union.

== The Fétiche series ==
In 1933 Ladislas and Irene Starevich produced and directed a film of about 1000 meters, initially titled LS 18. Under pressure from distributors, the length was greatly reduced. It became the film Fétiche Mascotte (The Mascot), about 600 meters, distributed in 1934. Starevich had a contract with Marc Gelbart (Gelma Films) to make a series with this character. Twelve episodes were planned, but for economic reasons, only five were made between 1934 and 1937 and distributed worldwide. These are Fétiche prestidigitateur (The Ringmaster, 1934), Fétiche se marie (The Mascot's Wedding, 1935), Fétiche en voyage de noces (The Navigator, 1936) and Fétiche et les sirènes (The Mascot and the Mermaids, 1937) which was not released because sound could not be added. There is an unfinished film, Fétiche père de famille (The Mascot and His Family, 1938). In 1954, L. Starevich conceived The Hangover, using images not included in The Mascot. A reconstruction of the original LS 18 was produced by 2012.

== During World War II ==
During this period (1937–1946), Starevich ceased producing films. He had expressed some intent to make commercial films, but none are known to have been produced during the war.

== After World War II ==
In 1946 he tried to make A Midsummer Night's Dream but abandoned the project due to financial problems. The following year, he made Zanzabelle a Paris adapted from a story by Sonika Bo. The script and direction of this film are credited to Irène. In 1949, he met Alexandre Kamenka (Alkam Films), an old Russian friend, who produced Starevich's first colour film Fleur de fougère (Fern Flower). It was based on an Eastern European story, in which a child goes to the forest to collect a fern flower, which grows during the night of Saint-Jean, and makes wishes come true. In 1950, Fern Flower won the first prize as an animated film in the 11th International Children Film Festival in Venice Biennale. Then he started a collaboration with Sonika Bo to adapt another of her stories, Gazouilly petit oiseau, followed by Un dimanche de Gazouillis (Gazouillis's Sunday picnic).

Again produced by Alkam films, Starevich made Nose to Wind, which tells the adventures of Patapouf, a bear who escapes from school to play with his friends the rabbit and the fox. The same year, 1958, his wife Anna died. Due to the success of the previous film, Winter Carousel was made, starring the bear Patapouf and the rabbit going through seasons. This was his last completed film. All his family co-labored on it, as remembers his granddaughter Martin-Starewitch, whose hands can be seen in animation tests from Like Dog and Cat, Starevich's unfinished film.

Ladislas Starevich died on February 26, 1965, while working on Comme chien et chat (Like Dog and Cat). He was one of the few European animators to be known by name in the United States before the 1960s, largely on account of La Voix du rossignol and Fétiche Mascotte (The Tale of the Fox was not widely distributed in the US). His Russian films were known for their dark humor. He kept every puppet he made, so stars in one film tended to turn up as supporting characters in later works (the frogs from The Frogs Who Wanted a King are the oldest of these). For example, in Fétiche mascotte (1933) the viewer can see puppets from The Scarecrow, The Little Parade, and The Magical Clock. The films have shown incredible imagination and also development of techniques including motion blur, replacement animation, multiple frame exposure, and reverse shooting.

== Posterity ==
Since 1991, Leona Beatrice Martin-Starewitch, Ladislas Starevich's granddaughter and her husband, François Martin, have restored and distributed her grandfather's films.

Filmmaker Terry Gilliam ranked The Mascot among the ten best animated movies of all time.

In 2005, Xavier Kawa-Topor and Jean Rubak joined three Starevich short films together to make a feature film, with music by Jean-Marie Senia. The film, entitled Tales of the Magical Clock, contributed to recognition by the press and the public of Starewitch Engineering.

In 2009, Wes Anderson paid homage to Le Roman de Renard in Fantastic Mr. Fox.

In 2012 a full reconstruction of LS18 to the original length and content of 1933 had been reconstructed, called Fetish 33-12. This was done by Léona Béatrice Martin-Starewitch, his granddaughter, and her husband, François Martin, owners of the rights to the films made by Starevich and his family. The reconstruction used multiple original copies of "The Mascot" (distributed in the United Kingdom and the United States of America), a negative of The Hangover and material from the archives of Ladislas Starevich.

In 2014, the town of Fontenay-sous-Bois and service Documentation Archive with the family Martin-Starewich organized projections of Ladislas Starewich films in municipal Kosmos cinema with the release of all the preserved films, more than 7 hours on two projection days.

== Filmography ==
=== Films directed in Kaunas (1909–1910) ===
(with original titles in Polish)

- Nad Niemnem (1909) – Beyond the River Nemunas
- Życie ważek (1909) – The Life of the Dragonflies
- Walka żuków (1909) – The Battle of the Stag Beetles
- Piękna Lukanida (1910) – The Beautiful Leukanida (the first puppet animation film)

These films except for The Beautiful Leukanida are currently considered lost.

=== Films directed in Russia (1911–1918) ===
(with original titles in Russian)

- Lucanus Cervus (1910) – Lucanus Cervus
- Rozhdyestvo Obitatelei Lyesa (1911) – The Insects' Christmas
- Aviacionnaya Nedelya Nasekomykh (1912) – Insects' Aviation Week
- Strashnaia Myest (1912) – The Terrible Vengeance
- Noch' Pered Rozhdestvom (1912) – The Night Before Christmas
- Veselye Scenki Iz Zhizni Zhivotnykh (1912) – Amusing Scenes from the Life of Insects
- Miest Kinomatograficheskovo Operatora (1912) – The Cameraman's Revenge
- Puteshestvie Na Lunu (1912) – A Journey to the Moon
- Ruslan I Ludmilla. (1913) – Ruslan and Ludmilla
- Strekoza I Muravei (1913) – The Grasshopper and the Ant
- Snegurochka (1914) – The Snow Maiden
- Pasynok Marsa (1914) – Mars's Stepson
- Kayser-Gogiel-Mogiel (1914) – Gogel-Mogel General
- Troika (1914) – Troika
- Fleurs Fanees 1914 – Faded Flowers
- Le Chant Du Bagnard (1915) – The Convict's Song
- Portret (1915) (May Be Produced By The Skobeliew Committee) – The Portrait
- Liliya Bel'gii (1915) – The Lily of Belgium
- Eto Tyebye Prinadlezhit (1915) – It's Fine for You
- Eros I Psyche (1915) – Eros and Psyche
- Dvye Vstryechi (1916) – Two Meetings
- Le Faune En Laisse (1916) – The Chained Faun
- O Chom Shumielo Morie (1916) – The Murmuring Sea
- Taman (1916) – Taman
- Na Varshavskom Trakte (1916) – On the Warsaw Highway
- Pan Twardowski (in Polish)(1917) – Mister Twardowski
- Sashka-Naezdnik (1917) – Sashka the Horseman
- K Narodnoi Vlasti (1917) – Towards People's Power
- Kaliostro (1918) – Cagliostro
- Yola (1918) – Iola
- Wij (1918) – Vij
- Sorotchinskaia Yarmaka (1918) – The Sorotchninsk Fair
- Maiskaya Noch (1918) – May Night
- Stella Maris (1918) – Starfish

=== Films directed in France (1920–1965) ===
(with original titles in French)

- Dans les Griffes de L'araignée (1920) – In The Claws of the Spider
- Le Mariage de Babylas (1921) – Babylas's Marriage
- L’épouvantail (1921) – The Scarecrow
- Les Grenouilles qui Demandent un Roi (1922) – Frogland
- La Voix du Rossignol (1923) – The Voice of the Nightingale
- Amour Noir et Blanc (1923) – Love In Black and White
- La Petite Chanteuse des Rues (1924) – The Little Street Singer
- Les Yeux du Dragon (1925) – The Eyes of the Dragon
- Le Rat de Ville et le Rat Des Champs (1926) – The Town Rat and the Country Rat
- La Cigale et la Fourmi (1927) – The Ant and the Grasshopper
- La Reine des Papillons (1927) – The Queen of the Butterflies
- L'horloge Magique (1928) – The Magic Clock
- La Petite Parade (1928) – The Little Parade
- Le Lion et le Moucheron (1932) – The Lion and the Fly
- Le Lion Devenu Vieux (1932) – The Old Lion
- Fétiche Mascotte (1933) – The Mascot
- Fétiche Prestidigitateur (1934) – The Ringmaster
- Fétiche se Marie (1935) – The Mascot's Marriage
- Fétiche en Voyage De Noces (1936) – The Navigator
- Fétiche Chez les Sirènes (1937) – The Mascot and the Mermaids
- Le Roman de Renard (1930–1939) – The Tale of the Fox
- Zanzabelle a Paris (1947) – Zanzabelle in Paris
- Fleur de Fougère (1949) – Fern Flowers
- Gazouilly Petit Oiseau (1953) – Little Bird Gazouilly
- Gueule de Bois (1954) – Hangover
- Un Dimanche de Gazouilly (1955) – Gazouilly's Sunday Picnic
- Nez au Vent (1956) – Nose to the Wind
- Carrousel Boréal (1958) – Winter Carousel
- Comme Chien et Chat (1965) – Like Dog and Cat

A documentary about Starevich called The Bug Trainer was made in 2008.

=== DVD editions ===
- Le monde magique de Ladislas Starewitch, Doriane Films, 2000.

Content: The Old Lion, The Town Rat and the Country Rat (1932 sound version) The mascot and Fern Flowers.

Bonus: The Town Rat and the Country Rat (1926 silent version)

- Le Roman de Renard (The Tale of the Fox), Doriane Films, 2005.

Bonus: The Navigator

- Les Contes de l'horloge magique, Éditions Montparnasse, 2005.

Content: The Little Street Singer, The Little Parade and The Magic Clock.

- The Cameraman's Revenge and Other Fantastic Tales, Milestone, Image Entertainment, 2005

Content: The Cameraman's Revenge, The Insect's Christmas, The Frogs who Wanted a King (short version), The Voice of the Nightingale, The Mascot and Winter Carrousel.

- Les Fables de Starewitch d'aprés la Fontaine, Doriane Films, 2011.

Content: The Lion and the Fly, The Town Rat and the Country Rat (1926), The Frogs who Wanted a King (original version), The Ant and the Grasshopper (1927 version), The Old Lion and Comment naît et s'anime une ciné-marionnette (How Cinema-Marionnettes Are Born and Brought to Life).

Bonus: The Old Lion (French narrated version) and The Town Rat and the Country Rat (1932 version)

- Nina Star, Doriane Films, 2013.

Content: The Scarecrow, The Babylas's Wedding, The Voice of the Nightingale, The Queen of the Butterflies.

Bonus: The Babylas's Wedding (tinted colours), The Queen of the Butterflies (United Kingdom version), Comment naît et s'anime une ciné-marionnette.

- L'homme des confins, Doriane Films, 2013.

Content: In the Spider's Claws, The Eyes of the Dragon, Love Black and White

Bonus: The Eyes of the Dragon (1932 sound version), Love Black and White (1932 sound version), Comment naît et s'anime une ciné-marionnette

- Fétiche 33-12, Doriane Films, 2013

Bonus: The Mascot, Gueule de bois, Comment naît et s'anime une ciné marionnette.
