= Lucanus Cervus (film) =

- Russian: Жук-олень
- Directed by: Ladislas Starevich
- Release date: 1910
- Country: Russian Empire

Lucanus Cervus (Russian: Жук-олень) is a 1910 Lithuanian short film directed by Ladislas Starevich. It was the first puppet stop motion animation in history, consisting of two preserved male stag beetles (Lucanus cervus) their legs replaced by wire, animated fighting one another over a mate.

== Production ==
Starevich created Lucanus Cervus in 1910 while he was director of the Museum of Natural History in Kaunas, Lithuania. He had been commissioned to produce four nature documentaries.

Starevich had originally intended to film live stag beetles rutting over a mate, but the stage lighting in use at the time would quickly kill the nocturnal insects. Instead, Starevich experimented with making articulated puppets out of dried stag beetle specimens. He fitted them with wires glued to their abdomens by sealing wax, replacing their legs. He drew each position of movement and composed each position before shooting the insects with a frequency of sixteen frames per second, the maximum at the time. Starevich animated these puppets with stop-motion to recreate their fighting behavior as accurately as possible.

The result was not only the first recorded use of puppetry in film, but the first use of dead insects as stop-motion puppets. Starevich would make widespread use of stop-motion throughout his career as a filmmaker and animator. The unusual idea was reportedly inspired by the short film Les allumettes Animées (The Animated Matches) (1908) by French animator Émile Cohl.
