= The Beautiful Leukanida =

1912 film by Władysław Starewicz

- Russian: Прекрасная Люканида, или Война усачей с рогачами
- Directed by: Władysław Starewicz
- Written by: Władysław Starewicz
- Cinematography: Władysław Starewicz
- Release date: 1912
- Country: Russian Empire

The Beautiful Leukanida (Russian: Прекрасная Люканида, или Война усачей с рогачами) is a 1912 Russian short film directed and written by Władysław Starewicz.

== Plot ==
The film speaks of two bugs which fight over a beautiful female bug.

== Restoration ==
In 2012 Gosfilmofond of Russia restored the cartoon. The author of the version was Nikolai Izvolov. In addition to restoring the image, the voice-over narration of the events on the screen was performed by Alexander Negreba.

"Sentimental Waltz" by Pyotr Tchaikovsky (1881) was used as the musical background. The premiere screening of the restored version took place as part of the 16th White Pillars Archival Film Festival 2012, held from January 30 to February 3, 2012.
