= The Cameraman's Revenge =

1912 Russian short film

- Russian: Месть кинематографического оператора
- Directed by: Ladislas Starevich
- Written by: Ladislas Starevich
- Produced by: Aleksandr Khanzhonkov
- Production company: Khanzhonkov Trading House
- Release date: October 27, 1912
- Running time: 12 minutes
- Country: Russia

The Cameraman's Revenge (1912)

The Cameraman's Revenge (Russian: Месть кинематографического оператора, romanized: Mest' kinematograficheskogo operatora) is a 1912 Russian short film written and directed by Ladislas Starevich. It, along with other works by Starevich, stands out in the history of stop-motion animation for its use of actual dried insect specimens (beetles, grasshoppers, dragonflies, etc.) as articulated stop-motion puppets portraying all of the characters.

The film is a humorous look at adultery, voyeurism, hypocrisy, and revenge porn. A married man cheats on his wife with a nightclub's dancer. A cameraman is secretly filming their amorous encounter. During a date with his wife at a movie theater, the man discovers that his supposedly private moments are on display at the theater.

== Plot ==
Mr. and Mrs. Beetle are a married couple. Even though husband and wife have a seemingly normal life, Mr. Beetle frequently goes to the city to do "business". But Mr. Beetle's real reason for his travels is to have an affair with his mistress, a dragonfly dancer at the Gay Dragonfly nightclub. However, a grasshopper also lusts after the dancer and gets beaten up by Mr. Beetle. In revenge, the grasshopper, who happens to be a cameraman, secretly follows Mr. Beetle and his mistress to a hotel and films them having sex.

Unbeknownst to Mr. Beetle, Mrs. Beetle is also adulterous. She quickly invites her own lover, a male cricket artist who gives her a painting of herself. Mrs. Beetle and her lover are making out when Mr. Beetle suddenly comes home. In a rage, he destroys the painting and throws the artist out of his house. Mr. Beetle forgives his wife, who is clueless to his own affair, and takes her to the movie theater. Unfortunately for Mr. Beetle, the same cameraman is also the film projectionist. When the Beetles sit down, the cameraman projects Mr. Beetle's tryst. Furious, Mrs. Beetle beats her husband with her umbrella, causing him to run into the projection screen and sending it crashing down on the audience. Mr. Beetle then runs into the projectionist's booth, still chased by Mrs. Beetle, and tackles the cameraman, damaging the film projector and starting a fire.

Mr. and Mrs. Beetle are imprisoned for burning down the movie theater and they reconcile inside their shared prison cell.

== Production ==
The film was one the last Starevich made in Russia.

== Home video ==
A DVD version of the short exists.

== Reception ==
The film was described as "Starevich's most famous Russian production" and his "most ambitious film".

== Analysis ==
According to Giannalberto Bendazzi, "The Cameraman’s Revenge is a perfect example of young Starewitch’s unsentimental, unmoralistic style. The story is perfectly suited for animal characters. As in Aesop and Phaedrus’ fables, it is universal because its protagonists are animals – i.e. symbols. Mr. and Mrs. Beetle are a typical middle-class couple bored by family life. Starewitch’s characters are also good actors: The spectator has fun and identifies himself in the incoherent and very realistic Mr. Beetle. His acting is, again, a balanced mix between human and animal action: His human feelings are clear but, at the same time, his features and anatomical structure are scientifically correct."
