= List of Soviet films of 1917–1921 =

A list of films produced in the Soviet Union between 1917 and 1921:

== 1918 ==
Title	Original title	Director	Cast	Genre	Notes
1918
Be Silent, My Sorrow, Be Silent	Молчи, грусть...молчи	Pyotr Chardynin	Vera Kholodnaya, Pyotr Chardynin, Ossip Runitsch, Vitold Polonsky, Vladimir Maksimov	Drama	
Cinema Week	Kino-nedelya	Dziga Vertov		News-reel	
Cohabitation	Уплотнение	Anatoli Dolinov, Donat Pashkovskiy and Aleksandr Panteleyev			
Father Sergius	Отец Сергий	Yakov Protazanov	Ivan Mosjoukine, Nathalie Lissenko	Biopic	
The Lady and the Hooligan	Барышня и хулиган	Vladimir Mayakovsky, Yevgeni Slavinsky	Vladimir Mayakovsky, Aleksandra Rebikova, Fyodor Dunaev	Drama	
The Last Tango	Последнее танго	Vyacheslav Viskovsky			
The Project of Engineer Prite	Проект инженера Прайта	Lev Kuleshov			
Tale of Priest Pankrat	Сказка о попе Панкрате	Olga Preobrazhenskaya			

== 1919 ==
Title	Russian title	Director	Cast	Genre	Notes
1919
Ave Caesar!	Аве, Цезарь!	Alexander Korda	Gábor Rajnay, María Corda, Oscar Beregi, Sr.	Drama	Hungarian Soviet Republic
Comrade Abram	Товарищ Абрам	Aleksandr Razumny			
People Die for Metal	Люди гибнут за металл	Alexandre Volkoff	Zoia Karabanova		
The Iron Heel	Железная пята	Vladimir Gardin	Olga Bonus, Anatoli Gorchilin, Aleksandra Khokhlova	Drama	
White Rose	Белая роза	Alexander Korda	María Corda, Gyula Bartos, Emil Fenyvessy, Helene von Bolváry, Gyula Szőreghy	Drama	Hungarian Soviet Republic
Yamata	Ямата	Alexander Korda	Emil Fenyvessy, Ila Lóth, Gábor Rajnay, Gusztáv Vándory	Drama	Hungarian Soviet Republic

== 1920 ==
Title	Original title	Director	Cast	Genre	Notes
1920
In the Days of Struggle	В дни борьбы	Ivane Perestiani	Andrei Gorchilin, Vsevolod Pudovkin	Drama	Lost film
On the Red Front	На красном фронте	Lev Kuleshov	Aleksandra Khokhlova, Lev Kuleshov, Leonid Obolensky, A. Reich	Adventure	
Story of Seven Who Were Hanged	Рассказ о семи повешенных	Pyotr Chardynin, Nikolai Saltykov	Dora Chitorina, Nikolai Saltykov, Yakov Morin, Karl Tomsky, Sergei Tsenin	Drama	Lost film

== 1921 ==
Title	Original title	Director	Cast	Genre	Notes
1921
Hunger... Hunger... Hunger...	Голод… голод… голод	Vladimir Gardin and Vsevolod Pudovkin			
The Murder of General Gryaznov		Ivan Perestiani	Mikheil Chiaureli	Action	Georgian SSR
Sickle and Hammer	Серп и молот	Vladimir Gardin	Aleksandr Gromov, Anatoli Gorchilin, N. Zubova, Vsevolod Pudovkin	Drama	
