= Drama in a Gypsy Camp near Moscow =

- Russian: Драма в таборе подмосковных цыган
- Directed by: Vladimir Siversen
- Written by: Vladimir Siversen
- Produced by: Aleksandr Khanzhonkov
- Starring: Pyotr Chardynin
- Cinematography: Vladimir Siversen
- Production company: Khanzhonkov Trading House
- Release date: 1909
- Country: Russian Empire

Drama in a Gypsy Camp near Moscow (Russian: Драма в таборе подмосковных цыган, romanized: Drama v tabore podmoskovnykh tsygan) is a 1909 Russian black and white silent short film directed and written by Vladimir Siversen. Only a fragment survived, without subtitles.

The survived fragment of the film

== Plot ==
In 1908, the Russian film magazine Cine-Phono described the plot as follows.

In Moscow suburbs, near Kuntsevo Park, there is a gypsy camp. The beauty of the camp, the gypsy Aza, has two admirers. One of them, Aleko, manages to see her alone, and he learns that she reciprocates his feelings. Returning from a date, Aza meets near the camp another admirer who demands a decisive answer to his proposal. Pushing him away, Aza tells him that she has already given her word to another. Happy Aleko sends matchmakers to Aza's parents, receives consent, and the wedding celebration begins in the camp. In the midst of the fun, the rejected rival, knowing Aleko's passion for card games, sends his comrade to him with an offer to play cards. Then he joins the players. Aleko is amazingly unlucky; having lost all his money, he bets his last possession - a horse. The cards are thrown - and the horse goes to his rival. With grief, Aleko says goodbye to his faithful comrade. He has lost everything, and only one joy remains - his young wife. But a cunning rival offers him one last bet - his young wife. The passion for the game and the desire to get back what he has lost make Aleko decide to put his wife on the bet. In vain does the young wife beg him to abandon this crazy act, it is too late, the card is swept away, and the card is lost. With a desperate cry, Aleko throws himself on the ground. The camp is alarmed and, having learned what is going on, indignantly expels the unfortunate player. Such a shameful incident has never happened in their camp. Night has descended on the earth. After a noisy day, the camp has fallen into a deep sleep. Aleko carefully creeps up to the camp and looks for Aza. He wakes her up and begs her to go with him and listen to him. After much hesitation, she agrees. Leaving the camp, Aleko begs his wife to run away with him, he swears that he will work honestly and that the camp will accept him again, but Aza cannot forgive the insult: losing her at cards - and does not want to leave her new husband and her native camp. But Aleko could not agree that his wife belong to another. The southern blood boiled in him, and, snatching a dagger from his belt, he plunged it into Aza's heart. She only screamed, fell dead. Aleko rushed away. Having reached the steep bank of the Moscow River, he threw himself off the cliff, and the first rays of the rising sun illuminated the corpse of the unfortunate Aleko - the victim of the demon of gambling.

== History ==
Khanzhonkov wrote that the film was planned to be "the first Russian everyday drama". For authenticity, the real gypsy camp was used, without props. However the film suffered from poor acting of the gypsies in front of the camera.
