= The Power of Darkness (1909 film) =

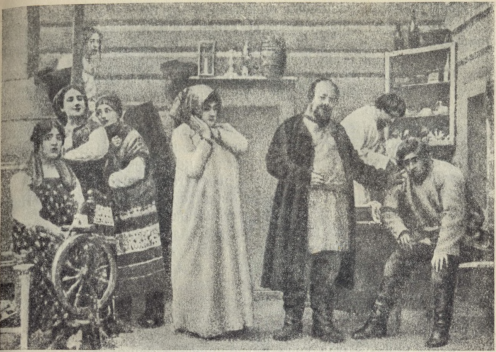
- Production still from the film
- Russian: Власть тьмы
- Directed by: Pyotr Chardynin
- Produced by: Aleksandr Khanzhonkov
- Starring: Pyotr Chardynin; Aleksandra Goncharova
- Cinematography: Vladimir Siversen
- Production company: A. Khanzhonkov and Co.
- Release date: 14 November 1909
- Running time: 20 min. (365 meters)
- Country: Russian Empire
- Language: Silent (Russian intertitles)

The Power of Darkness (Russian: Власть тьмы) is a 1909 Russian short silent film. It is a film adaptation of the eponymous 1886 play by Leo Tolstoy, starring Pyotr Chardynin and Aleksandra Goncharova, and directed by Chardynin in his directorial debut.

Like most Russian films of the era, it is considered lost.

== Plot ==
Nikita is a Russian peasant working for a married couple with two children. The wife, Anisya, is dissastified in her marriage, and with the help of Nikita's mother, poisons her husband to death in order to be with Nikita instead. However, after they are married, Nikita spurns her for her daughter (and his step-daughter) Akulina. Akulina becomes bethrothed to a neighbor, but has also become pregnant by Nikita. After the baby is born in secret, Nikita murders it at the urging of both his wife and mother, but he is consumed by guilt over his sins. He confesses to the police on the day of Akulina's wedding, and is taken away.

== Cast ==
The cast for this film was recruited from Vvedensky People's House, Moscow (now the Yauza Palace), which staged the play in 1908.

- Pyotr Chardynin as Nikita
- Aleksandra Goncharova

== Production ==
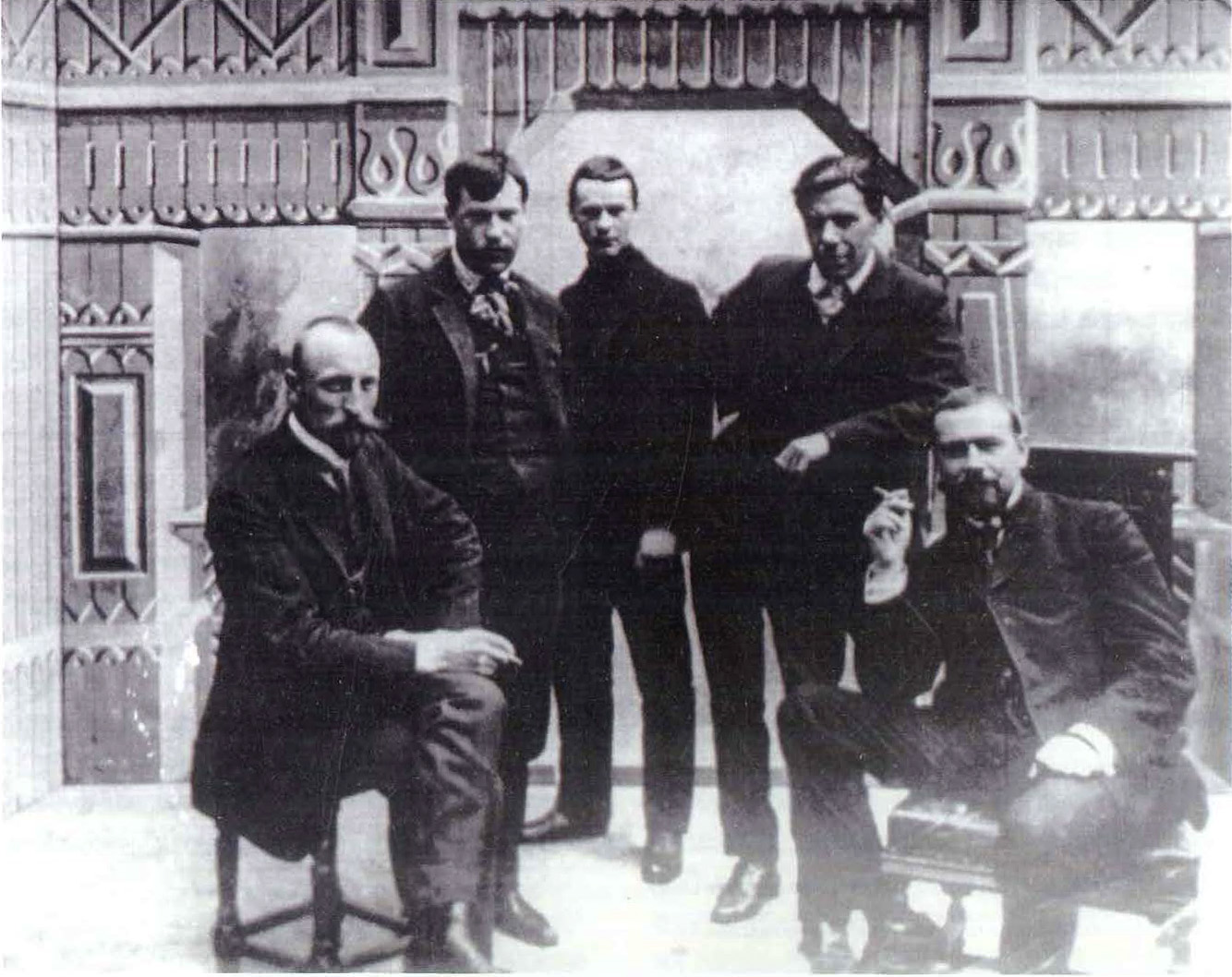
Siversen (left), Chardynin (second from right), Khanzhonkov (far right), and two unidentified men at Khanzhonkov's studio

During the early 20th century, the film market in the Russian Empire was largely controlled by foreign films, especially those produced by the French company Pathé. Their adaptation of Resurrection was the first film based on the works of Leo Tolstoy to play in Russian theaters, in October 1909. However, these foreign films met with local criticism for inaccurate portrayals of Russian life.

Film producer Aleksandr Khanzhonkov selected The Power of Darkness to begin a series of domestically-produced film adaptations of Tolstoy's works. Many of the personnel he selected for this production would remain fixtures of Khanzhonkov's company, including cinematographer Vladimir Siversen and several actors from the Vvedensky People's House troupe, including Pyotr Chardynin. This film also marked Chardynin's directorial debut, a role he continued to fill in Khanzhonkov's films for several years.

All of the Khanzhonkov Tolstoy films shared similar stylistic elements. They were intended for audiences already familiar with the adapted works, and presented only a selection of key scenes without any context or transitions. The intention was to illustrate the play in a manner similar to lubok literature, rather than present the entire play on film. For The Power of Darkness, seven scenes were filmed. These scenes occupied 365 meters of film, giving it a run-time of about twenty minutes, and making it the longest domestically produced Russian film at the time of its première on 14 November 1909.

== Reception and legacy ==
The Russian trade journal Cine-Phono gave the film a positive review. The film was also a financial success, with Khanzhonkov later writing that it was one of the three most successful of the 1909–10 film season. (Note: The others were the 1909 Ermak Timofeevich, the Vanquisher of Siberia and the 1910 Peddlers.)

Most Russian films of this era, including all of Khanzhonkov's Tolstoy adaptations, are believed lost.

== Bibliography ==
- Khanzhonkov, Aleksandr Aleksejevich (1937). "Создание производственной базы" [Creation of production base]. In Semyu, P. (ed.). Первые Годы Русской Кинематографии: Воспоминания [The First Years of Russian Cinematography: Memoirs] (in Russian). Iskusstvo. pp. 30–47. OCLC 7902385.
- Lebedev, Nikolai Alekseevich (1965) [1947]. Очерки истории кино СССР: Немое кино (1918–1934) [Essay on the History of Cinema of the USSR: Silent Movies (1918–1934)] (in Russian) (2nd ed.). Iskusstvo. OCLC 236214496.
- Vishnevskiy, Ven. (1937). "Фильмография кинопроизводство А. А. Ханжонков" [A. A. Khanzhonkov Production Filmography]. In Semyu, P. (ed.). Первые Годы Русской Кинематографии: Воспоминания [The First Years of Russian Cinematography: Memoirs] (in Russian). Iskusstvo. pp. 143–173. OCLC 7902385.
