= By the Fireplace =

1917 Russian drama film

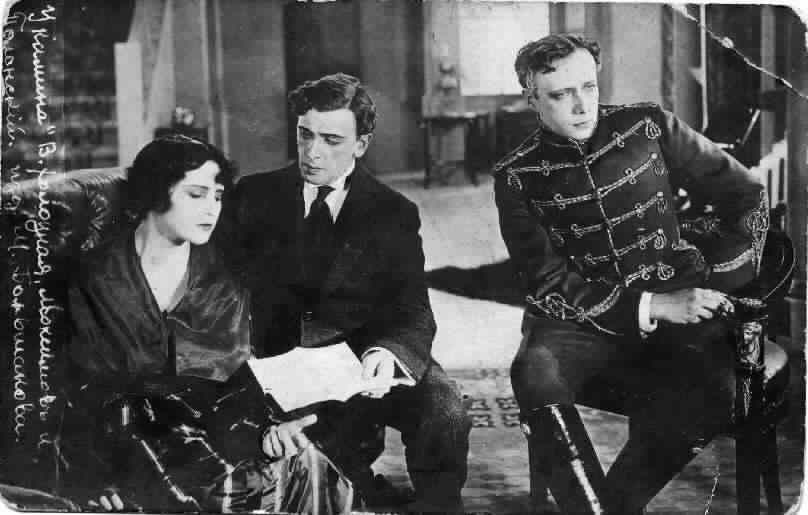
- Russian: У камина
- Directed by: Pyotr Chardynin
- Starring: Vera Kholodnaya; Vladimir Maksimov; Vitold Polonsky
- Cinematography: Pyotr Chardynin
- Production company: Kharitonov Trading House
- Release date: 1917
- Country: Russian Empire
- Language: Russian

By the Fireplace (Russian: У камина) is a 1917 Russian silent black and white love triangle melodrama film directed by Pyotr Chardynin.

== Plot ==
Lydia Lanina (played by Vera Kholodnaya) is a beautiful woman happily married to her devoted husband (played by Witold Polonsky). Lydia often sings by the piano while her husband listens, sitting by the fireplace.

During a dinner party, Lydia performs a romance song at the piano. Midway through the evening, her husband receives orders to leave on a business trip. As the guests depart, the only one who remains is a handsome prince (played by Vladimir Maksimov), a longtime family friend who is hopelessly in love with Lydia. Overcome with passion, he declares his love for her and tries to seduce her. Lydia barely manages to escape his advances.

The prince, filled with guilt and despair, contemplates suicide. Feeling pity for him, Lydia agrees to a private meeting. In a moment of weakness, she is unfaithful to her husband. Upon his return, Lydia confesses everything. Shocked and heartbroken, her husband agrees to a divorce.

The aftermath leaves all three characters in emotional torment. Lydia, consumed by shame and sorrow, takes her own life. Her husband and the prince, both overwhelmed with grief, meet at her funeral. Though once rivals, they blame only themselves for her tragic end.

The film begins and ends with a scene of Lydia’s husband as an old man, sitting by the fireplace, gazing at the dying embers and reminiscing about his lost happiness—giving the film its title.

== Cast ==
- Vera Kholodnaya as Lydia
- Vladimir Maksimov as Prince Peshchersky
- Vitold Polonsky as Lanin

== Commentary ==
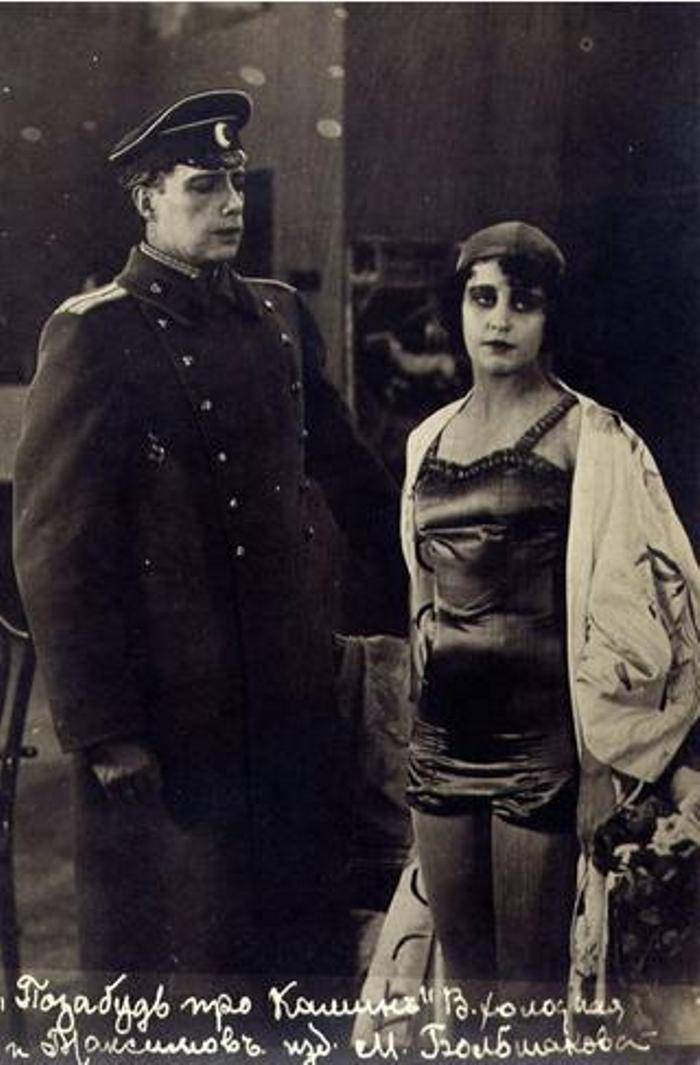
A scene from "Forget about the Fireplace" with Maksimov and Kholodnaya

Due to the commercial success of the film, the same year Chardynin shot its sequel, an equally melodramatic Forget about the Fireplace, Its Fire is Gone, with even larger success. Some time after the death of his lover, the protagonist sees a girl strikingly resembling his passion. She is a circus actress, and she tragically dies in the end.
