= Mirages (1915 film) =

- Russian: Миражи
- Directed by: Pyotr Chardynin
- Written by: Lidiya Charskaya (novel); Ekaterina Tissova
- Starring: Arsenii Bibikov; Tamara Gedevanova; Andrej Gromov; Aleksandr Kheruvimov; Vera Kholodnaya; Vitold Polonsky; Olga Rakhmanova
- Release date: 1915
- Country: Russian Empire

Mirages (Russian: Миражи, romanized: Mirazhi) is a 1915 short film directed by Pyotr Chardynin.

== Plot ==
Mirages (1915)

The film is based on the novel by Lidiya Charskaya.

A young and beautiful girl Marianna from a poor family is hired as a reader by an elderly millionaire Dymov. She lives in a family with her mother and other family members, plays in performances, she has a fiancé Sergei.

Dymov's son begins courting the beautiful reader. The girl feels a craving in her soul for wealth and luxury. After the death of the elder Dymov, she receives a large amount of money from him.

Young Dymov dissuades her from marrying Sergei. He manages to seduce Marianne with “the tinsel of a rich life; the heroine converges with him, breaks with the family, refuses her fiancé”. The girl writes a letter to her mother that she has found what her soul has been looking for a long time, and the everyday gray atmosphere of life with Sergey would be unbearable for her. Marianna breaks with her fiancé and leaves the family, becoming the mistress of the handsome Dymov.

But a little time passes, and the “handsome seducer” gets tired of his passion. Marianne finds out that her seducer is not going to marry her, and realizes “how mirage her happiness was”.

== Starring ==
- Arsenii Bibikov as Dymov, The Millionaire
- Tamara Gedevanova as Marianna's Sister
- Andrej Gromov
- Aleksandr Kheruvimov as Theater director
- Vera Kholodnaya as Marianna
- Vitold Polonsky as Dymov Jr.
- Olga Rakhmanova as Marianna's Mother
