= Dekabrist (disambiguation) =

A Dekabrist ("Decembrist") was a participant in the Russian Decembrist revolt of 1825.

It can also refer to:

- Soviet ship Dekabrist, several vessels of the former Soviet Union
- Dekabrist (flower), the common Russian term for a Christmas cactus

== See also ==
- Dekabristy, a 1927 Russian film
- Dekabristov Island, a riverine island in St Petersburg
- Decembrist (disambiguation)
