= The Project of Engineer Prite =

1918 Russian short film by Lev Kuleshov

- Russian: Проект инженера Прайта
- Directed by: Lev Kuleshov
- Written by: Boris Kuleshov
- Produced by: Aleksandr Khanzhonkov
- Starring: N. Gardy; Yelena Komarova; Boris Kuleshov; Eduard Kulganek; L. Polevoy
- Cinematography: Mark Izrailson-Naletnyy
- Production company: A. Khanzhonkov and Co.
- Release date: 1918
- Country: Soviet Russia

The Project of Engineer Prite (Russian: Проект инженера Прайта) is a 1918 short film directed by Lev Kuleshov.

== Plot ==
Two power plants compete for the extraction of peat.

== Starring ==
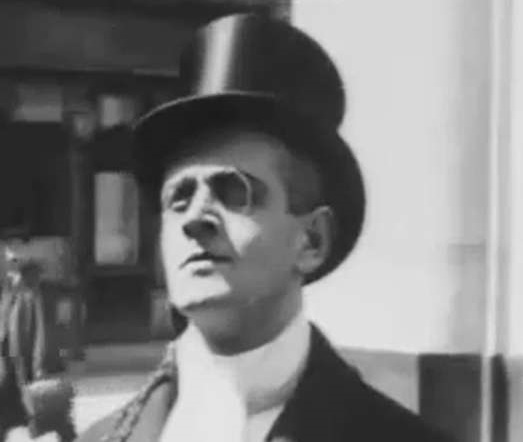
L. Polevoy in the film

- N. Gardy
- Yelena Komarova
- Boris Kuleshov
- Eduard Kulganek
- L. Polevoy
