= Siversen =

Siversen is a surname.

- Louise Siversen, Australian actress
- Vladimir Siversen, (1873–?) Russian pioneering cinematographer and film director
