= Infinite Sorrow =

1922 film

- Directed by: Aleksandr Panteleyev
- Written by: Andrei Zarin
- Starring: Pyotr Kirillov
- Cinematography: Nikolai Kozlovsky
- Production company: Sevzapkino
- Release date: 4 May 1922
- Running time: 80 minutes
- Country: Soviet Union
- Language: Silent film

Infinite Sorrow (Russian: Скорбь бесконечная, romanized: Skorb beskonechnaya) is a 1922 Soviet drama film directed by Aleksandr Panteleyev about the Russian famine of 1921.

== Cast ==
- Pyotr Kirillov
- Ursula Krug
- Vladimir Maksimov
- Yelena Chaika
- Georgii Fedorov
