= Decembrists (disambiguation) =

Decembrist(s) or The Decembrist(s) may refer to:

== Culture ==
- The Decembrists, Leo Tolstoy's 1884 unfinished sequel to War and Peace
- The Decembrists (film), 1927 Soviet silent historical drama directed by Aleksandr Ivanovsky
- The Decembrists (opera), 1953 opera by Yuri Shaporin
- The Decemberists, an American indie rock band formed in 2000
- "The Decembrist" (The Blacklist), episode 8 of season 2 of The Blacklist, aired in 2014

== Events ==
- Decembrist revolt or Dekabrist revolt, failed Russian uprising in December 1825
- Decembrist revolution (Argentina), coup by Juan Lavalle in December 1828

== Places ==
- Decembrists Square, former name for Senate Square, Saint Petersburg, Russia
- Decembrists' Island or Dekabristov Island, Saint Petersburg, Russia

== See also ==
- Dekabrist (disambiguation)
