= Vladimir Maksimov (actor) =

Russian actor (1880–1937)

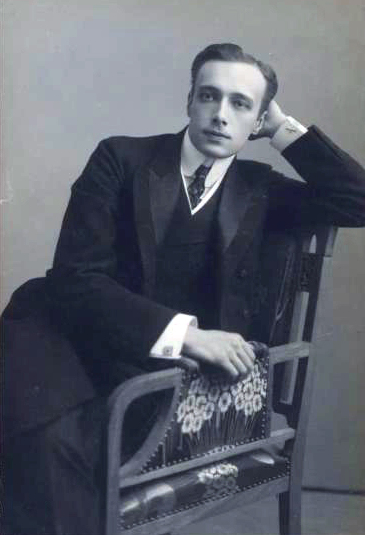
- Born: Vladimir Vasilievich Maksimov; 27 July 1880; Moscow, Russian Empire
- Died: 22 March 1937 (aged 56); Moscow, Soviet Union
- Occupation: Actor
- Years active: 1904–1937

Vladimir Vasilyevich Maksimov (Russian: Влади́мир Васи́льевич Макси́мов) was a Russian stage and silent film actor.

== Filmography ==
- The Decembrists as Emperor Alexander I (1927)
- Man Is Man's Enemy as Kraev (1923)
- Locksmith and Chancellor as Frank Frey (1923)
- Infinite Sorrow (1922)
- Be Silent, My Sorrow, Be Silent (short) as Volyntsev, an artist (1918)
- Zhenshchina, kotoraya izobrela lyubov (1918)
- Zhivoy trup (1918)
- By the Fireplace as Peshchersky (1917)
- Forget about the Fireplace, Its Fire is Gone as Peshchersky (1917)
- Vor (1916)
- Peterburgskiye trushchobi (1915)
- Das Haus ohne Tür (1914)
- Anfisa (1912)
- Kashirskaya starina (1911)
- Oborona Sevastopolya (1911)
- V polnoch na kladbishche (short) (1910)

== See also ==
- Ossip Runitsch
- Vitold Polonsky
- Vera Kholodnaya
