= The Last Tango =

- Russian: Последнее танго
- Directed by: Vyacheslav Viskovsky
- Written by: Iza Kremer
- Starring: A. Aleksandrov; Vera Kholodnaya; Ivan Khudoleyev; Ossip Runitsch
- Cinematography: Vladimir Siversen
- Production company: Kharitonov Trading House
- Release date: 1918
- Running time: 10 minute
- Country: Russian Empire
- Language: Russian

The Last Tango (Russian: Последнее танго) is a 1918 Russian silent film directed by Vyacheslav Viskovsky.

== Plot ==
A surviving fragment from The Last Tango

The film is based on the words of a song performed by Iza Kremer in Odessa.

== Starring ==
- A. Aleksandrov as Kellner
- Vera Kholodnaya as Chloe
- Ivan Khudoleyev as Sir Stone
- Ossip Runitsch as Joe
