= The Power of Darkness =

Russian play by Leo Tolstoy

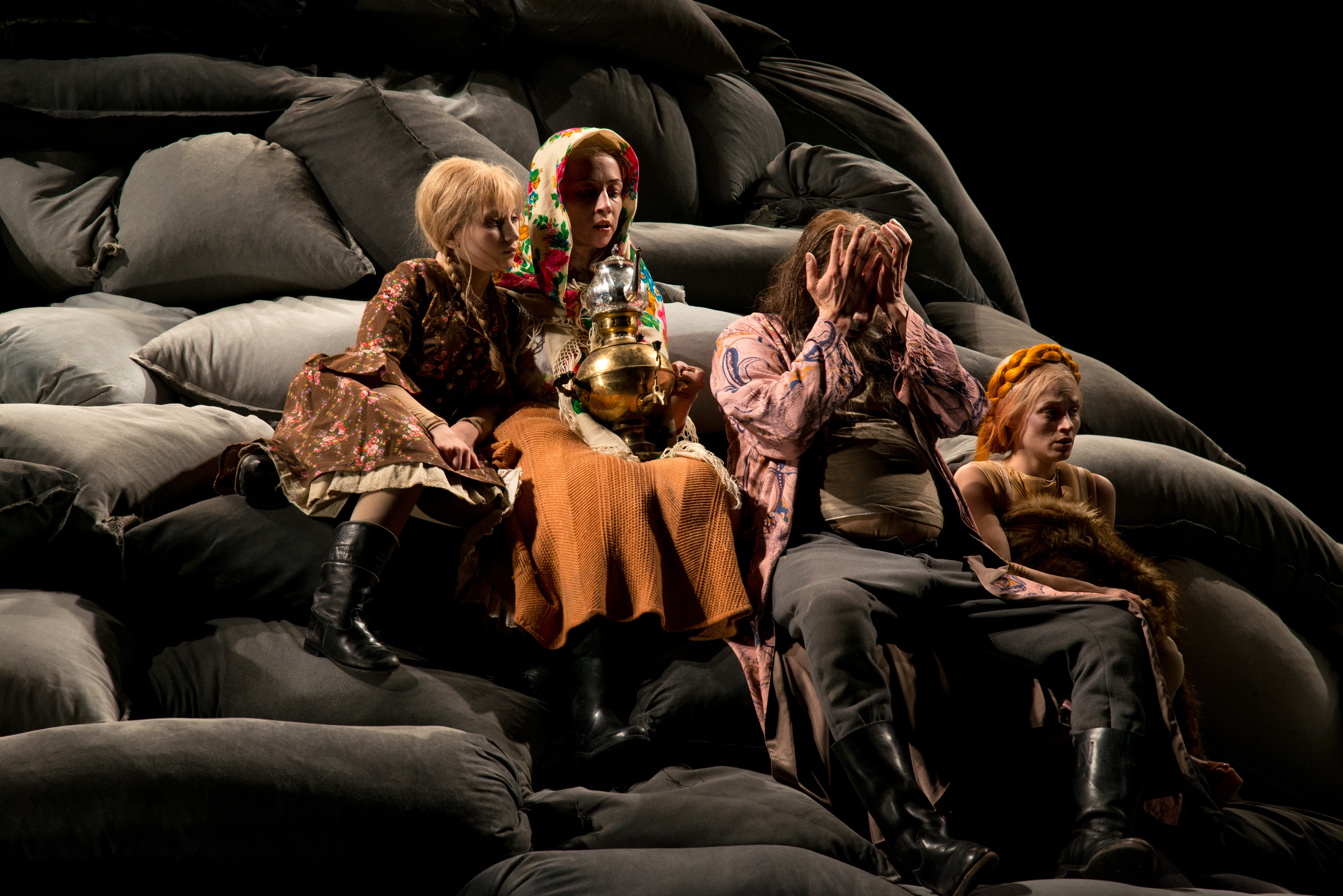
- Die Macht der Finsternis, Akademietheater Vienna, 2015
- Original language: Russian
- Written by: Leo Tolstoy
- Genre: Naturalistic drama

The Power of Darkness (Russian: Власть тьмы, Vlast′ t′my) is a five-act drama by Leo Tolstoy. Written in 1886, the play's production was banned in Russia until 1902, mainly through the influence of Konstantin Pobedonostsev. In spite of the ban, the play was unofficially produced and read numerous times.

== Overview ==
A peasant, Nikita, a farmhand of another wealthy peasant seduces a young orphan girl and abandons her for the wife of his master, Anisya, who poisons her already sick husband to marry Nikita. At the same time he has an affair with Anisya's daughter and eventually impregnates her (i.e., his new stepdaughter). Under his wife's and mother's influence, he murders the newborn. On the day of his stepdaughter's marriage, he surrenders himself and confesses to the police.

== Production history ==
French theatre pioneer André Antoine staged La Puissance des Ténèbres—a French translation of the play, by Pavlovsky and Oscar Méténier—in Paris at the Théâtre Montparnasse on 10 February 1888 to great acclaim. Constantin Stanislavski, the Russian theatre practitioner, had wanted to stage the play in 1895; he had persuaded Tolstoy to rewrite act four along lines that Stanislavski had suggested, but the production did not materialise. He eventually staged it with his Moscow Art Theatre in 1902. That production opened on 5 December and enjoyed some success. Stanislavski, however, was scathingly critical, particularly of his own performance as Mitrich. Years later, in his autobiography My Life in Art, he wrote:

Realism only becomes Naturalism when it is not justified by the artist from within. [...] [T]he external realism of the production of The Power of Darkness revealed the absence of inner justification in those of us who were acting in it. The stage was taken over by things, objects, banal outward events [...] which crushed the inner meaning of the play and characters.

Actor Jacob Adler had a New York hit in 1904 with his own Yiddish translation—the first successful production of a Tolstoy play in the United States.

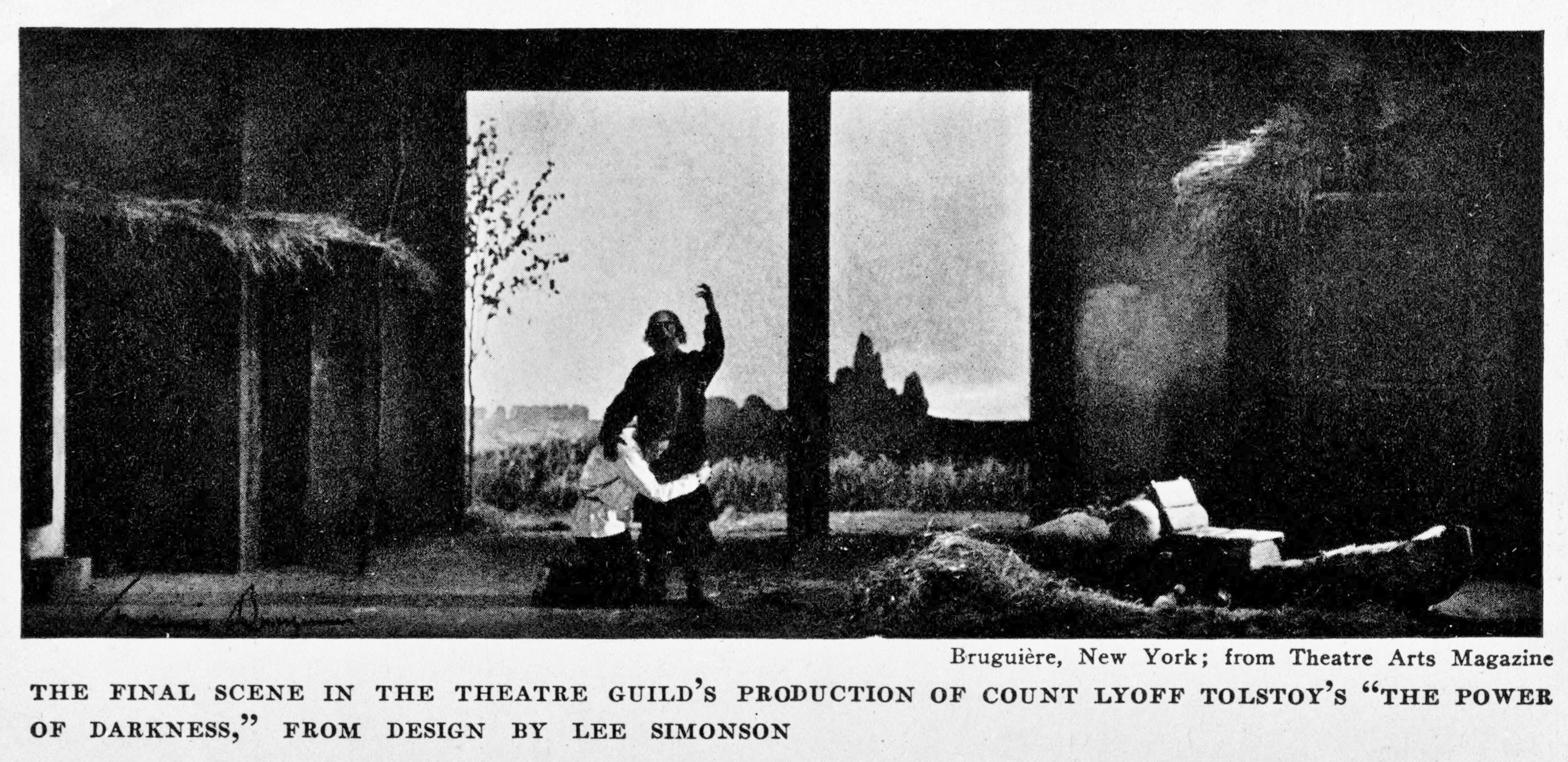
The final scene, 1922

In 1923, the German epic theatre director Erwin Piscator staged the play at his "proletarian Volksbühne" (a rival to the Volksbühne), in Berlin. "Our intention," Piscator writes, "was to move toward a political message from a broad artistic base." The production opened on 19 January at the Central-Theater on the Alte Jakob Strasse. Having aimed for "the greatest possible realism in acting and decor," Piscator described his production as "thoroughly naturalistic." Herbert Ihering approved of its attempt to bring serious drama at low ticket-prices to working-class audiences, though he thought that its attention to naturalistic detail distracted from the core meaning of the play.

Mint Theater Company staged a production of the play in New York City in 2007. They used a new translation by director Martin Platt.

== Film ==
In addition to worldwide staging, the play was put to film several times.

- The Power of Darkness (1909 film), lost silent Russian film directed by Pyotr Chardynin, who also played Nikita. Chardynin filmed another version, in 1915, also lost.
- In 1918 it was filmed by Arthur Wellin, titled Die Macht der Finsternis with Aleksandër Moisiu as Nikita.
- The Power of Darkness (1924 film), silent German film directed by Conrad Wiene

== Works cited ==
- Adler, Jacob. 1999. A Life on the Stage: A Memoir. Translated by Lulla Rosenfeld. New York: Knopf. ISBN 0-679-41351-0.
- Benedetti, Jean. 1999. Stanislavski: His Life and Art. Revised edition. Original edition published in 1988. London: Methuen. ISBN 0-413-52520-1.
- Piscator, Erwin. 1980. The Political Theatre. Trans. Hugh Rorrison. London: Methuen. ISBN 0-413-33500-3. Originally published in 1929; revised edition 1963.
- Rorrison, Hugh. 1980. Editorial notes. In Piscator (1980).
- Willett, John. 1978. The Theatre of Erwin Piscator: Half a Century of Politics in the Theatre. London: Methuen. ISBN 0-413-37810-1.
