= Vladimir Maksimov =

Vladimir Maksimov may also refer to:

- Vladimir Maksimov (actor) (1880–1937), Russian and Soviet actor
- Vladimir Maksimov (writer) (1930–1995), Soviet and Russian writer
- Vladimir Maksimov (handballer) (born 1945), Soviet and Russian handball player and coach
