= Nikolay Borisov =

Nikolay Andreyevich Borisov (Russian: Николай Андреевич Борисов, Ukrainian: Микола Андрійович Борисов; October 11, 1889 - September 3, 1937) was a Soviet Ukrainian writer best known for an adventure novel Ukrasia which was the base of the popular 1925 film Ukrasia directed by Pyotr Chardynin. He wrote his books in Russian, but they were immediately translated in Ukrainian.

He graduated from the Yaroslavl Cadet Corps, and Kiev Military School and fought in World War I, earning military decorations. During the Russian Civil War, for a short time he was with White Army, then joined the Red Army.

He wrote adventure novels he dubbed "cine-novels" (cinema novels), a popular form in these times. In 1920s he worked as a screenwriter in film studios of Odesa and Yalta. He knew several foreign languages and was a fan of Esperanto, which was a pretext for his ill fate. He was arrested and executed in 1937, accused of participation in the "counter-revolutionary Trotskyite organization among Esperantists".

== Works ==
- 1925: "Укразия" (Ukraziya, Ukrasia), cine-novel (cinema novel, Кино-роман)
- 1925: Генерал с того света, a lost short film, co-authored the screenplay with Vladimir Vajnshtok
  time slip genre: a Russian Imperial Army general wakes up in the Soviet Union
- 1927: Green Apples: A Collective Novel
  pseudotranslation "from American language by Nikolay Borisov", allegedly written by a Kornelius Krok; in fact it was a "bouts-rimés-novel", a collage of excerpts of translations of 17 popular novels
  The subtitle "Collective Novel" is a parody on the real tradition of the crowdwritten collective novels of the time
- 1927: Слово за наганом., cine-novel
  Subtitled "Из жизни белогвардейского поручика в период гражданской войны 1918 г." [From the life of a White Guard lieutenant during the civil war of 1918]
- 1928: Vive la commune! A novel from the epoch of 1871
- 1929: "Четверги мистера Дройда", cine-novel, a sequel to "Ukrasia" set in near future
  The story is set in a future capitalist country where total mind control has been invented, and the citizens are controlled by the "Committee for Human Salvation"
