= The Doll Maker of Kiang-Ning =

1923 film directed by Robert Wiene

- Directed by: Robert Wiene
- Written by: Carl Mayer
- Produced by: Robert Wiene
- Starring: Werner Krauss; Lia Eibenschütz; Ossip Runitsch
- Cinematography: Willy Hameister
- Production company: Lionardo Film
- Distributed by: Deitz & Co]
- Release date: 1923
- Country: Germany
- Languages: Silent; German intertitles

The Doll Maker of Kiang-Ning (German: Der Puppenmacher von Kiang-Ning) is a 1923 German silent fantasy film directed by Robert Wiene and starring Werner Krauss, Lia Eibenschütz, and Ossip Runitsch.

== Plot ==
A doll maker in Kiangning (modern Nanjing), China crafts a puppet which he is convinced is lifelike. He takes it to exhibit at a public event, but is outraged to find an even more convincing and beautiful doll there. It is in fact a real woman pretending to be a doll, but he becomes so obsessed he attempts to steal her and the film ends with her rescue and his tragic death.

== Premiere ==
The film had its premiere in Berlin in November 1923. It received a universally negative reception from critics who were particularly unimpressed by the attempt to portray Chinese culture using German actors. The film continues a wider theme in the director Robert Wiene's work which contrasts Western and Eastern cultures.

== Cast ==
- Werner Krauss
- Lia Eibenschütz
- Ossip Runitsch
- Lucie Mannheim
- Julius Falkenstein
- Fritz Achterberg
- Hans Schweikart
- Eugen Rex
- Yuri Yurovsky
- Alexander Alexandrowski

== Bibliography ==
- Jung, Uli; Schatzberg, Walter (1999). Beyond Caligari: The Films of Robert Wiene. New York: Berghahn Books. ISBN 978-1-57181-156-1.
