= Locksmith and Chancellor =

1923 film

- Directed by: Vladimir Gardin
- Written by: Vladimir Gardin; Anatoli Lunacharsky (play); Vsevolod Pudovkin
- Cinematography: Yevgeni Slavinsky
- Production company: VUFKU
- Release date: 1923
- Country: Soviet Union
- Languages: Silent; Russian intertitles

Locksmith and Chancellor (Russian: Слесарь и Канцлер, romanized: Slesar i kantsler) is a 1923 Soviet silent film directed by Vladimir Gardin based on the play of Anatoli Lunacharsky.

The film's art direction was by Vladimir Yegorov.

== Synopsis ==
The Government of the fictional country Norland has unleashed a war with the neighboring Galikania and is suffering one defeat after another. A group of conspirators who were dissatisfied with this state of affairs, led by the Social Democrat Frank Frey arrange a coup to overthrew the emperor of Norland. But the working class does not like the new order either. Workers expose Frank Frey's policy of continuing the war and a revolution breaks out in the country. The leader of the socialist revolution becomes a mechanic of the name Franz Stark.

== Cast ==
- Ivan Khudoleyev as Emperor of Norland
- Nikolai Panov as Chancellor von Turau
- N. Tairova as von Turau's wife
- Vladimir Gardin as Gammer
- Vladimir Maksimov as Frank Frey, lawyer
- Zoya Barantsevich as Countess Mitsi
- Iona Talanov as Berenberg
- Nikolai Saltykov as Franz Stark, locksmith
- Lidiya Iskritskaya-Gardina as Anna
- Oleg Frelikh as Leo von Turau
- Ivan Kapralov as Robert von Turau
- V. Valitskaya as Lora von Turau, Robert's wife
- Olga Bystritskaya as Anna, Leo's lover
- A. Semyonov as Netli, chancellor's secretary
- M. Arnazi
- Aleksandra Rebikova
- Evgeniy Gryaznov
- Karl Tomski
- Nikolay Popov
- Stepan Kuznetsov
- Olga Preobrazhenskaya

== Bibliography ==
- Sargeant, Amy. Vsevolod Pudovkin: Classic Films of the Soviet Avant-garde. I.B.Tauris, 2001.
