= Vladimir Siversen =

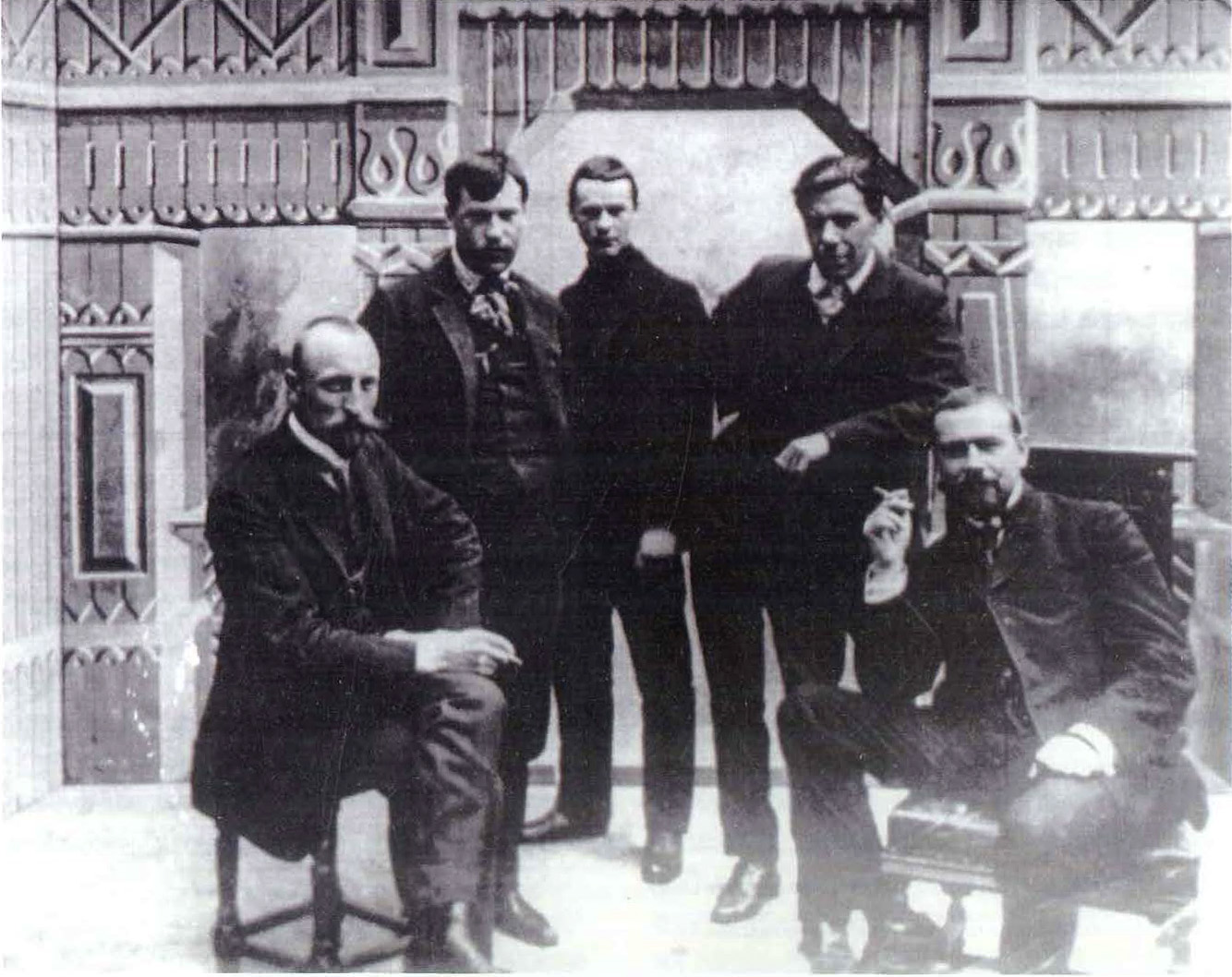
Siversen (leftmost), Chardynin (second from the right), Khanzhonkin (rightmost), 1917

Vladimir Siversen (Russian: Сиверсен, Владимир Фёдорович) was a pioneering Russian cinematographer and film director of German descent. Until 1917 he was mostly known for his work in the film studio of Aleksandr Khanzhonkov.

== Filmography ==
- 1908: Drama in a Gypsy Camp near Moscow
- 1908: ru:Песнь про купца Калашникова (фильм)
- 1909: Boyarin Orsha (film)
- 1909: ru:Чародейка (фильм, 1909)
- 1909: Vanka the Steward
- 1909: The Power of Darkness (1909 film)
- 1909: Mazeppa (1909 film)
- 1909: Dead Souls (1909 film)
- 1909: 16th Century Russian Wedding
- 1910: The Water Nymph (1910 film)
- 1910: Vadim (1910 film)
- 1918: Be Silent, My Sorrow, Be Silent
- 1918: The Last Tango
