= The Kreutzer Sonata (1911 film) =

1911 film

- Directed by: Pyotr Chardynin
- Written by: Pyotr Chardynin; Leo Tolstoy (story)
- Starring: Ivan Mozzhukhin
- Cinematography: Louis Forestier
- Production company: Khanzhonkov
- Release date: 1 October 1911
- Country: Russian Empire
- Languages: Silent; Russian intertitles

The Kreutzer Sonata (Russian: Крейцерова соната, romanized: Kreytserova sonata) is a 1911 Russian silent film directed by Pyotr Chardynin. The film is considered lost.

== Cast ==
- Pyotr Chardynin
- Ivan Mozzhukhin as Trukhachevski
- Lyubov Varyagina

== Bibliography ==
- Christie, Ian & Taylor, Richard. The Film Factory: Russian and Soviet Cinema in Documents 1896-1939. Routledge, 2012.
