= Monument to Aleksandr Khanzhonkov =

Coordinates: 47°13′37″N 39°42′15″E

Monument to Aleskandr Khanzhonkov
- Памятник Александру Ханжонкову
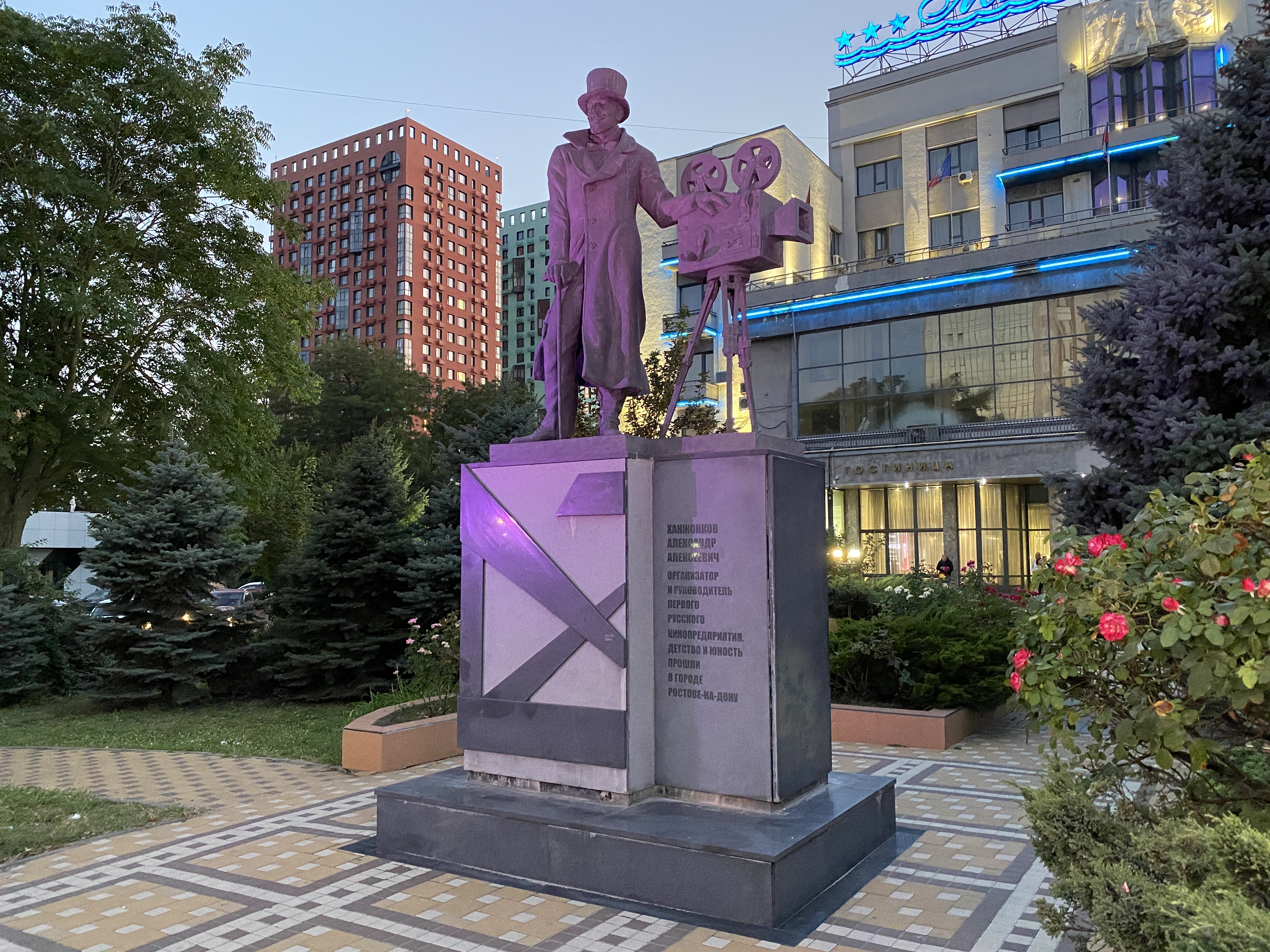
- Interactive map of Monument to Aleskandr Khanzhonkov
- Location: 104 Krasnoarmeyskaya Street
- Designer: Sergey Oleshnya, Yury Dvornikov
- Type: monument
- Material: bronze
- Height: 2,5 m
- Opening date: 2016
- Dedicated to: Aleksandr Khanzhonkov

The Monument to Aleksandr Khanzhonkov is a bronze statue that is situated at Budyonnovky Prospect and Krasnoarmeyskaya Street intersection, near Marins Park Hotel, in Rostov-on-Don and commemorates Russian cinematographer Aleksandr Khanzhonkov. Statue was made by Rostov-on-Don's sculptor and academician of Russian Academy of Arts Sergey Oleshnya. and unveiled on 24 August 2016.

== History ==
Lyubov Surkova first proposed a monument to Khanzhonkov. She contacted the municipal administration and garnered additional support. Decision to memorialize pioneer of Russian cinematography was adopted in early 2016. Soon the work on sketches started – out of two created sketches, one was implemented. Sergey Oleshnya and Yury Yakovlevich Dvornikov were chosen as lead sculptor and creator of the pedestal respectively. Other sculptors and architects also contributed to the creation of the monument.

The statue is situated in front of the Alekseevskaya gymnasium where Aleksandr Khanzhonkov studied. Near the area is a film studio. Two plaques will be placed in locations frequented by Khanzhonkov – on the building where the director spent his school days and where he watched a film for the first time.

Figure of Aleksandr Khanzhonkov with an old camera was forged out of bronze. The height of the pedestal reaches 2 meters; the statue's height is 2,5 meters. The statue was unveiled during International Motivational Film Festival Bridge of Arts and attended by several television presenters and actors.
