= Ivan Khudoleyev =

Russian actor

Ivan Nikolaevich Khudoleyev (Russian: Иван Николаевич Худолеев; 24 September 1875 – 19 May 1932) was a Soviet silent film actor.

== Selected filmography ==
- Be Silent, My Sorrow, Be Silent (1918)
- The Last Tango (1918)
- The Iron Heel (1919)
- Locksmith and Chancellor (1923)
- The Decembrists (1927)
- The Poet and the Tsar (1927)
- Kastus Kalinovskiy (1928)
