= The Headless Horseman (1973 film) =

1973 film

- Directed by: Vladimir Vajnshtok
- Written by: Vladimir Vajnshtok; Pavel Finn
- Starring: Oleg Vidov; Ludmila Savelyeva; Aarne Üksküla; Ivan Ivanovich Petrov
- Music by: Nikita Bogoslovsky
- Production company: Lenfilm
- Release date: 1973
- Running time: 104 minutes
- Countries: Soviet Union; Cuba
- Language: Russian
- Box office: 51,7 million tickets sold

The Headless Horseman (Russian: Всадник без головы, romanized: Vsadnik bez golovy) is a 1973 Soviet-Cuban Red Western film directed by Vladimir Vajnshtok based on the eponymous novel by Thomas Mayne Reid. The film was the first Soviet Western. It was a box office success, 51,7 million tickets were sold and the picture holds the 33rd place in terms of cinema attendance in the Soviet Union.

== Plot ==
The film takes place in 1850, Texas, United States. Louise, daughter of the wealthy plantation owner Poindexter, master of the hacienda Casa del Corvo, falls in love with a poor mustanger Maurice Gerald. The night their secret rendezvous happens, her brother Henry disappears. Suspicion in murder falls on Gerald, who was found covered in blood, with signs of struggle on the body and on Henry's cloak. One more minute, and an angry crowd would have Gerald lynched, but then the mysterious Headless Horseman appears...

== Cast ==
- Oleg Vidov as Maurice Gerald (voiced by Eduard Izotov)
- Ludmila Savelyeva as Louise Poindexter
- Eslinda Núñez as Isidora Cavarubio
- Enrique Santiesteban as El Coyote (voiced by Aleksandr Belyavsky)
- Alejandro Lugo as Woodley Poindexter (voiced by Felix Yavorsky)
- Aarne Üksküla as Cassius Calhoun (voiced by Aleksey Konsovsky)
- Ivan Ivanovich Petrov as Zeb Stump
- Rolando Dias Reyes as Major (voiced by Aleksandr Belyavsky)
- Aleksandr Milokosty as Henry Poindexter (voiced by Aleksei Zolotnitsky)
- Platon Leslie as Pluton (voiced by Daniil Netrebin)

== Production ==
The picture was filmed in Crimea and Azerbaijan; Yalta, Bilohirsk and Khizi served as the locations. The manes and tails of horses were painted with silver. Cotton fields were created by decorators scattering ordinary cotton around and the cacti were plastic. The slaves were played by Cuban medical students from Simferopol. Many actors spoke Spanish and the mouth movements do not always match the Russian dubbing.
