= Playing with Fire (1921 German film) =

1921 German film

- Directed by: Robert Wiene; Georg Kroll
- Written by: Alexander Engel; Julius Horst
- Produced by: Erich Pommer
- Starring: Diana Karenne; Vasilij Vronski; Ossip Runitsch; Anton Edthofer; Hans Junkermann
- Cinematography: Fritz Arno Wagner
- Production company: Decla-Bioscop
- Distributed by: Decla-Bioscop
- Release date: May 1921
- Country: Germany
- Languages: Silent; German intertitles

Playing with Fire (German: Das Spiel mit dem Feuer) is a 1921 German silent comedy-drama film directed by Georg Kroll and Robert Wiene and starring Diana Karenne, Vasilij Vronski, Ossip Runitsch, and Anton Edthofer. It was shot at the Babelsberg Studios in Berlin. The film received a generally positive reception from critics, although some were doubtful about the blending of farce and tragedy.

== Synopsis ==
A method actress likes living out the roles she is playing in real life. To prepare for her new play, she enters the criminal underworld and ends up being implicated in a burglary of a Duke who is one of her suitors.

== Cast ==
- Diana Karenne
- Vasilij Vronski
- Ossip Runitsch
- Anton Edthofer
- Hans Junkermann
- Emil Biron
- Viktor Blum
- Leonhard Haskel
- Emil Heyse
- Max Kronert
- Karl Platen
- Lucia Tosti
- Otto Treptow

== Bibliography ==
- Jung, Uli; Schatzberg, Walter (1999). Beyond Caligari: The Films of Robert Wiene. New York: Berghahn Books. ISBN 978-1-57181-156-1.
