= Emil Lind =

Austrian actor

- Born: 14 August 1872; Vienna, Austria-Hungary
- Died: 7 April 1948 (aged 75); Vienna, Austria
- Occupations: Actor, theatre director, drama teacher
- Years active: 1918-1927

Emil Lind (14 August 1872 – 7 April 1948) was an Austrian actor, theatre director and drama teacher on German-speaking stages.

== Selected filmography ==
- The Story of Dida Ibsen (1918)
- Die Arche (1919)
- Prostitution (1919)
- Humanity Unleashed (1920)
- The Infernal Power (1922)
- I.N.R.I. (1923)
- Superfluous People (1926)
- Mata Hari (1927)
- The Weavers (1927)
- Bigamie (1927)

== Bibliography ==
- Jung, Uli & Schatzberg, Walter. Beyond Caligari: The Films of Robert Wiene. Berghahn Books, 1999.
