= The Infernal Power =

1922 film directed by Robert Wiene

- German: Die höllische Macht
- Directed by: Robert Wiene
- Starring: Thea Kasten; Emil Lind; Ossip Runitsch
- Production company: Lionardo Film
- Release date: 1922
- Country: Germany
- Languages: Silent; German intertitles

The Infernal Power (German: Die höllische Macht) is a 1922 German silent film directed by Robert Wiene and starring Thea Kasten, Emil Lind and Ossip Runitsch. The film is now a lost film, and virtually nothing is known of its plot or genre.

== Cast ==
- Thea Kasten
- Emil Lind
- Ossip Runitsch
- Hans Schweikart

== Bibliography ==
- Jung, Uli & Schatzberg, Walter. Beyond Caligari: The Films of Robert Wiene. Berghahn Books, 1999.
