= Be Silent, My Sorrow, Be Silent =

1918 film

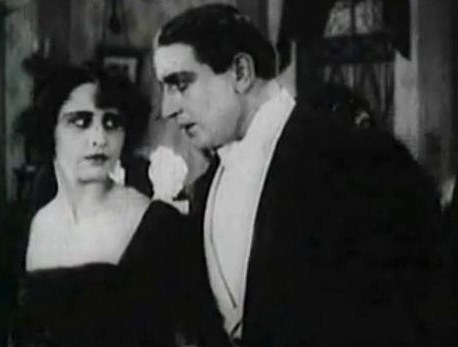
- Paula and Zaritskiy
- Russian: Молчи, грусть, молчи
- Directed by: Pyotr Chardynin
- Written by: Pyotr Chardynin
- Starring: Vera Kholodnaya; Pyotr Chardynin; Ossip Runitsch; Vitold Polonsky; Vladimir Maksimov
- Cinematography: Vladimir Siversen
- Production company: Kharitonov Trading House
- Release date: 1918
- Running time: 81 minutes
- Country: Soviet Russia
- Language: Silent film (Russian intertitles)

Be Silent, My Sorrow, Be Silent or Still, Sadness, Still (Russian: Молчи, грусть, молчи, romanized: Molchi, grust, molchi) is a 1918 Soviet melodramatic silent film (Russian intertitles) directed by Pyotr Chardynin, and starring Vera Kholodnaya, Ossip Runitsch, Vitold Polonsky and Vladimir Maksimov. The film is in two parts, but only the first part (44 minutes) survived. It was also known under the title Сказка любви дорогой. (Note: Both titles are lines from a 1915 Russian romance, lyrics by Anatoly D'Aktil, music by Grigory Berezovsky. Notable performers include Vera Kholodnaya and Eduard Khil. Молчи, грусть, молчи! Не тронь старых ран, Сказки любви дорогой Не вернуть никогда, никогда.)

== Plot ==
Be Silent, My Sorrow, Be Silent (1918)

Paula is a circus performer married to clown-acrobat Lorio. Lorio drinks heavily, and eventually he is critically injured when he performs drunk. The crippled Lorio and Paula are forced to become street musicians.

A group of wealthy young men who had previously seen Paula at the circus decide to invite the two to perform at their private "bachelor" party, at which Paula is the main attraction. The young men vie for her attention, give her an expensive necklace and offer Lorio money to turn her over to them. Outraged, Paula leaves and refuses to return to the streets to perform. But when they are truly destitute, she returns to offer herself to one of the gentlemen, the artist Volyntsev.

As Lorio sinks deeper into poverty, Paula enjoys her life as a rich man's mistress – for a while. Her lover becomes too possessive for her taste, and eventually tires of her. When Volyntsev attempts to offer her to a younger rival, Telepnev, Paula leaves him for another young man – Zaritskiy, who is deeply in love with her. Zaritskiy is an inveterate gambler, and playing against Telepnev, he has lost a huge sum of money. Desperate, he devises a plot to steal a cheque he gave to Telepnev. While Paula unwittingly serves as decoy, distracting the party by singing for the guests, her lover sets off the alarm as he attempts to break into the safe. Telepnev doesn't recognise Zaritskiy in the dark room, and shoots him, thus concluding the first part.

The second part is considered to be lost, but its plot is known from film reviews. Zarnitsky's death forces Paula to reunite with Telepnev. He commissions Volyntsev to paint Pola's portrait, and the artist and model fall in love. Telepnev wounds the artist in a duel. Volyntsev proposes to Paula, but the hypnotist and illusionist Prasvich tells Volyntsev's mother about Paula's dubious past. She convinces Paula to leave her son. Paula accompanies Prasvich, who has a hypnotic effect on her, on a foreign tour. Volyntsev and Lorio join forces to free Paula from Prasvich, but Paula, exhausted by her ordeal, dies.

== Commentary ==
Film critic Lidiya Zaytseva remarks that the film put together all stereotypes of the Russian cinematography of the time: "Considering its unique synthesis of genre forms, as well as the vast theatrical and literary experience it draws upon, Be Silent, My Sorrow, Be Silent should be considered a truly remarkable work, a kind of 'summary'. It offers a comprehensive overview of the path cinema has traveled as a whole."

== Cast ==
- Vera Kholodnaya – Paula, a circus artiste
- Pyotr Chardynin – Lorio, a clown-acrobat
- Ossip Runitsch – Zaritskiy, a barrister
- Vitold Polonsky – Telepnev, a rich gentleman
- Vladimir Maksimov – Volyntsev, an artist
- Konstantin Khokhlov – Olekso Presvich, a hypnotist and illusionist
- Ivan Khudoleyev – Prakhov, a merchant
- M. Masin – Innokentiy, Prakhov's valet
- Yanina Mirato – A lady of the demi-monde
- Olga Rakhmanova – Volyntsev's mother
