= Vladimir Vajnshtok =

Soviet film director and screenwriter (1908–1978)

- Born: Vladimir Petrovich Vajnshtok; 11 March 1908; Saint Petersburg, Russian Empire
- Died: 18 October 1978 (aged 70); Moscow, Soviet Union
- Resting place: Kuntsevo Cemetery, Moscow
- Occupations: Film director, screenwriter
- Notable work: The Headless Horseman (1973)

Vladimir Petrovich Vajnshtok (Russian: Владимир Петрович Вайншток; 11 March 1908 – 18 October 1978) was a Soviet film director and, under the name Vladimir Vladimirov, screenwriter.

== Selected filmography ==
=== Director ===
- Rubicon (Рубикон) (1931)
- Storm (Ураган) (1932)
- The Children of Captain Grant (Дети капитана Гранта) (1936)
- Treasure Island (Остров сокровищ) (1938)
- The Headless Horseman (Всадник без головы) (1973)
- Armed and Dangerous (Вооружен и очень опасен) (1977)

=== Screenwriter ===
- 1925: Генерал с того света, a time slip film directed by Pyotr Chardynin, screenplay by Nikolay Borisov and Vladimir Vajnshtok
- Rubicon (Рубикон) (1931)
- Treasure Island (Остров сокровищ) (1938)
- Dead Season (1968)
- The Headless Horseman (Всадник без головы) (1973)
- Armed and Dangerous (Вооружен и очень опасен) (1977)
- Twenty Six Days from the Life of Dostoyevsky (Двадцать шесть дней из жизни Достоевского) (1980)
