= Aleksandra Rebikova =

Russian actress

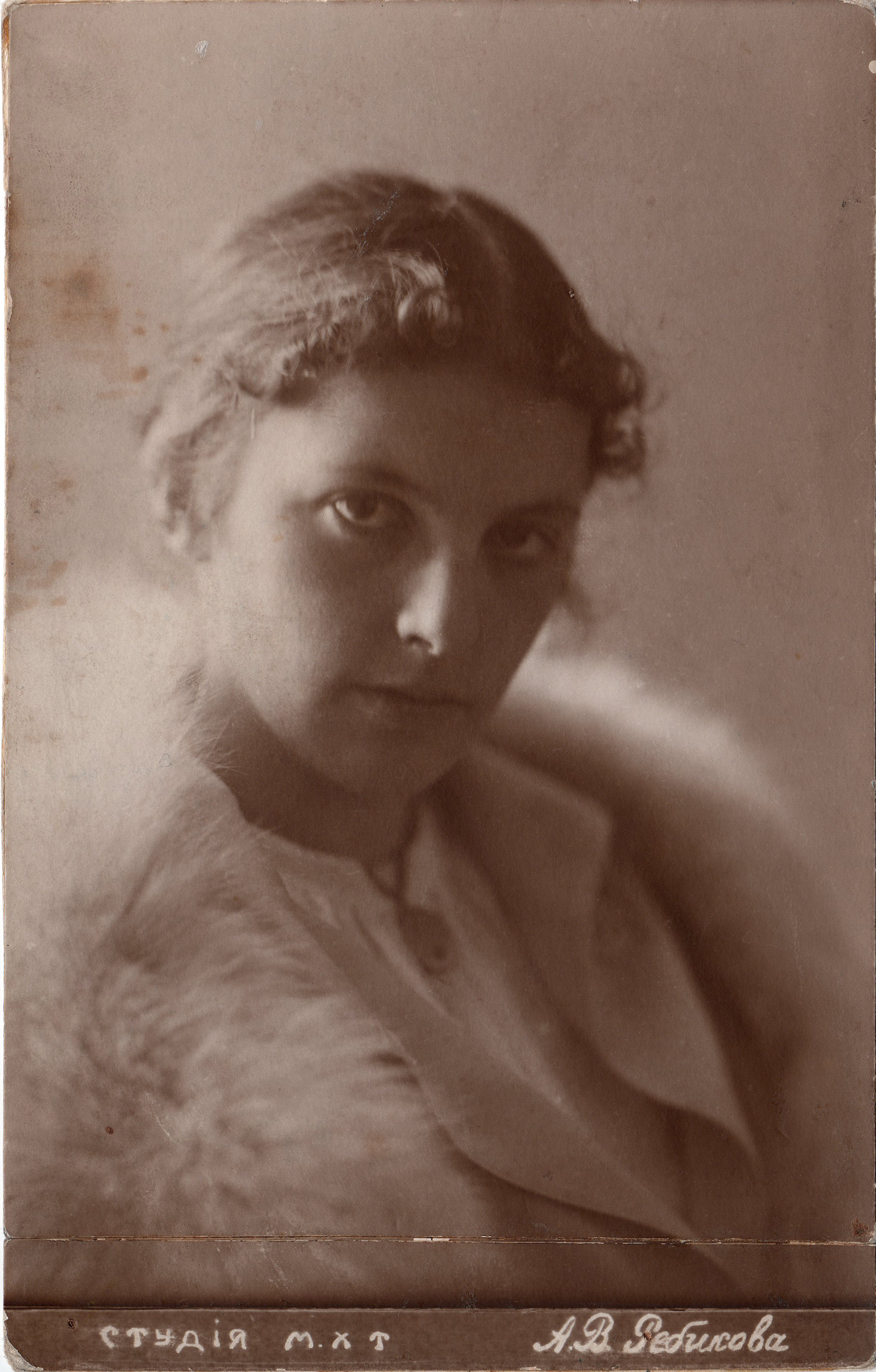
- Rebikova in 1910.
- Born: Aleksandra Rebikova; 1896
- Died: 1957 (aged 60–61)
- Occupation: actress
- Years active: 1915–1923

Aleksandra Rebikova (Russian: Александра Ребикова) was a Russian film actress.

== Selected filmography ==
- 1916 — Dikaya sila
- 1916 — Yamshchik, ne goni loshadey
- 1918 — The Lady and the Hooligan
