= Soviet ship Dekabrist =

Soviet ship Dekabrist can refer to several vessels of the former Soviet Union

- Soviet submarine Dekabrist, a pre-World War II submarine, lead vessel in her class
- Soviet destroyer Dekabrist, built as Japanese destroyer Hibiki, and seized after World War II
- SS Dekabrist, a Russian merchant ship sunk during World War II
- SS Dekabrist (1943), a Liberty ship transferred to Soviet service during World War II
