= The Lady and the Hooligan =

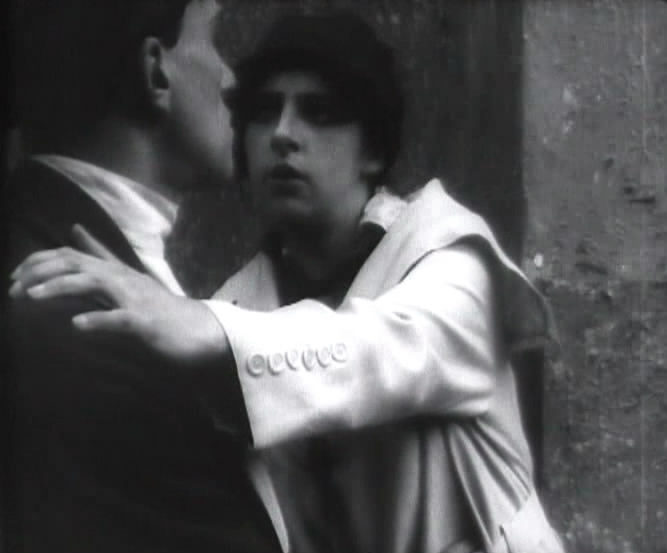
- Directed by: Vladimir Mayakovsky; Yevgeni Slavinsky
- Written by: Vladimir Mayakovsky
- Based on: La maestrina degli operai by Edmondo De Amicis
- Starring: Vladimir Mayakovsky; Aleksandra Rebikova; Fyodor Dunayev
- Cinematography: Yevgeni Slavinsky
- Production company: Neptun-Film
- Release date: 1918
- Running time: 43 minutes
- Country: Russia
- Languages: Silent film with Russian intertitles

The Lady and the Hooligan

The Lady and the Hooligan (Russian: Барышня и хулиган, romanized: Baryshnya i khuligan) is a 1918 Russian silent film co-directed by Vladimir Mayakovsky and Yevgeni Slavinsky. The script, written by Mayakovsky, is based on the story La maestrina degli operai (The Workers' Young Schoolmistress) by Edmondo De Amicis.

== Plot summary ==
A young schoolmistress arrives in a small village to teach reading and writing to boys and men. A hooligan sees her on the street and falls in love with her. Soon he begins to attend her classes. When one lesson is disturbed by one of the students, he beats him. The student seeks revenge with the help of his father and some of his friends. The hooligan is stabbed to death in a fight. Before dying, he asks his mother to call the schoolmistress. After the schoolmistress has kissed him on the lips, he closes his eyes and dies.

== Cast ==
- Vladimir Mayakovsky—Lava, the hooligan
- Aleksandra Rebikova—the schoolmistress
- Fyodor Dunaev—the director of the school
- Yan Nevinskiy—the hooligan's classmate

== Distribution ==
On 1 May (May Day), 1919, the film was shown in mass viewings in Moscow and Leningrad.

== Analysis and Significance ==
The film includes "fast-paced editing and (limited) shot-reverse-shot editing patterns."
