= Andrei Zarin =

Russian writer

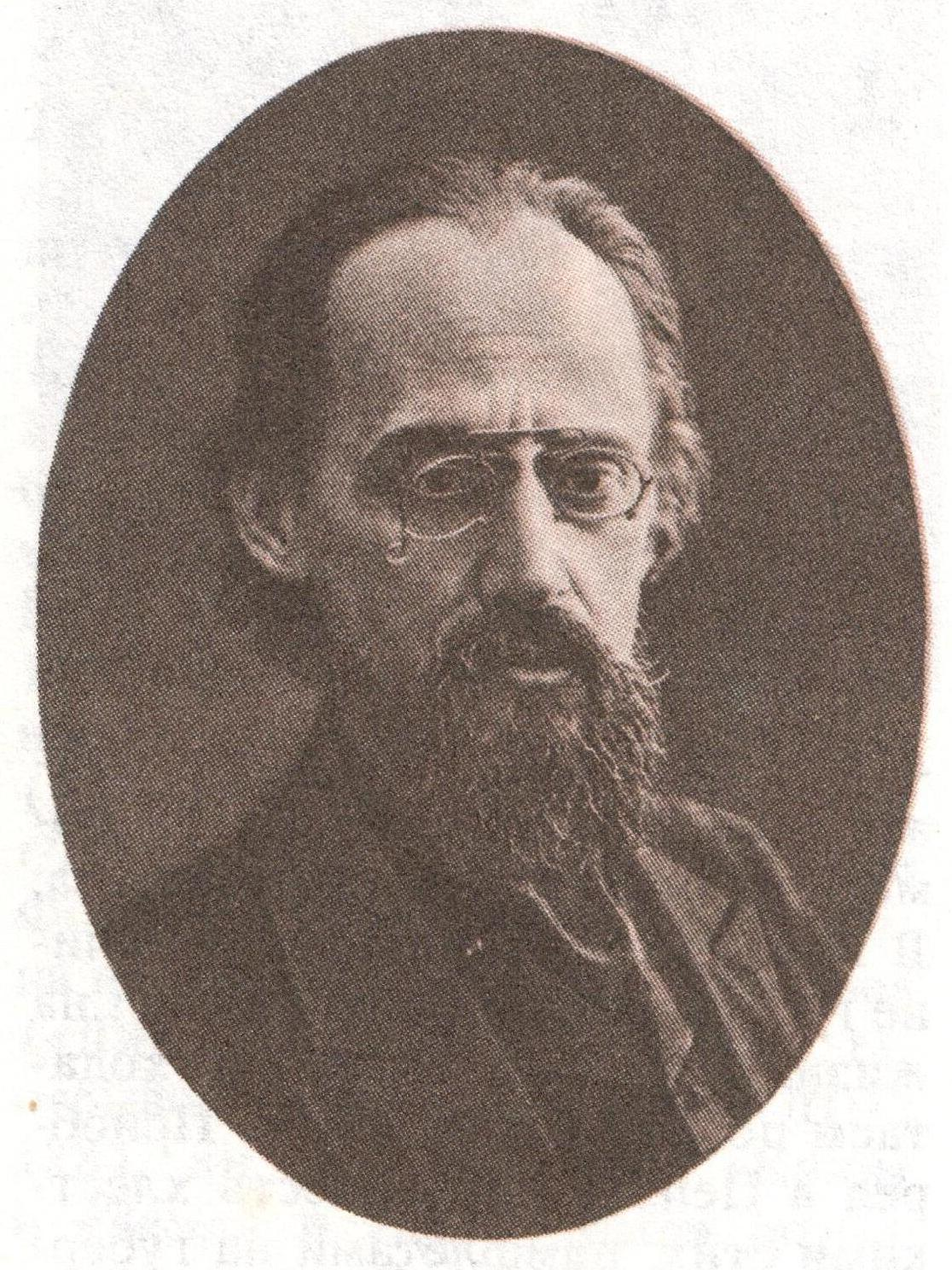
- Born: Andrei Yefimovich Zarin; 28 May 1862 Saint Petersburg, Russian Empire
- Died: 1929 USSR
- Occupation: Writer

Andrei Yefimovich Zarin (Russian: Андрей Ефимович Зарин; 28 May 1862 – 1929) was a Russian writer of popular novels and short stories, including crime fiction, in the late 19th and early 20th century. He was born in St Petersburg in the Russian Empire, graduating from the gymnasium and entering into Vilnius University in modern-day Lithuania in 1879. His first publications were economic articles in the Vilnius Gazette. He started publishing fiction in 1881. He was the editor of the journal Stars and Pictorial Review.

Most of Zarin's crime fiction focuses on the ingenuity of the detective in solving the crime, although his novella "In Search of a Murderer", first published in serial form in 1915, is notable for its unusually explicit for the time depiction of violence against women.

Like other popular Fin de siècle Russian novelists, Zarin deployed Spiritualist and Occult themes in his work, including in Spirit (1902) and Dar Satany (1906).

In 1906 he was imprisoned for one and a half years. He died in 1929.

== Works ==
=== Novels ===
- «Жизнь и сон» (Life and Dreaming) (1891),
- «Дочь пожарного» (Daughter of Fire) (1892),
- «Серые герои» (The Grey Hero) (1893),
- «Силуэты» (Silhouettes) (1897);
- «Призвание» (The Calling) (1897)

=== Short story collections ===
- «Говорящая голова» (Talking Head) (1896),
- «Повести и рассказы» (Tales and Stories) (1896),
- «Ложный след» (False Trail) (1896),
- «По призванию» (By Vocation) (1897),
- «Под корень» (Under the Root) (1895),
- «Тотализатор» (Totalisator) (1891),
- «Сорные травы» (Weeds) (1890),
- «Верное сердце» (Faithful Heart) (1897).
