= The Decembrists (film) =

1927 film

- Directed by: Aleksandr Ivanovsky
- Written by: Aleksandr Ivanovsky; Pavel Shchyogolev
- Cinematography: Ivan Frolov
- Production company: Leningradkino
- Release date: 8 February 1927
- Country: Soviet Union
- Languages: Silent; Russian intertitles

The Decembrists (Russian: Декабристы, romanized: Dekabristy) is a 1927 Soviet silent historical drama film directed by Aleksandr Ivanovsky.

== Plot ==
The film recreates the history of the movement of the Decembrists: an outbreak of peasant revolts, organization of nobility circles and the actual uprising; against the background of these events unfolds the romantic love story of the Decembrist Ivan Annenkov and French milliner Pauline Gueble.

== Cast ==
- Vladimir Maksimov as Emperor Alexander I
- Yevgeni Boronikhin as Emperor Nicholas I
- Varvara Annenkova as Polina Gebl-Annenkova
- Boris Tamarin as Decembrist Ivan Alexandrovich Annenkov
- Tamara Godlevskaya as Countess Ekaterina Ivanovna Trubetskaya
- Gennadiy Michurin as Count Sergei Trubetskoy
- Sergei Shishko as Decembrist Kondraty Ryleyev
- Valentin Lebedev as Count Obolensky
- Ivan Khudoleyev as Yakoby, relative of the Annenkovys
- Olga Spirova as Natalia Rileeva

== Bibliography ==
- Christie, Ian & Taylor, Richard. The Film Factory: Russian and Soviet Cinema in Documents 1896-1939. Routledge, 2012.
