= Pyotr Chardynin =

Russian film director

- Пётр Чардынин
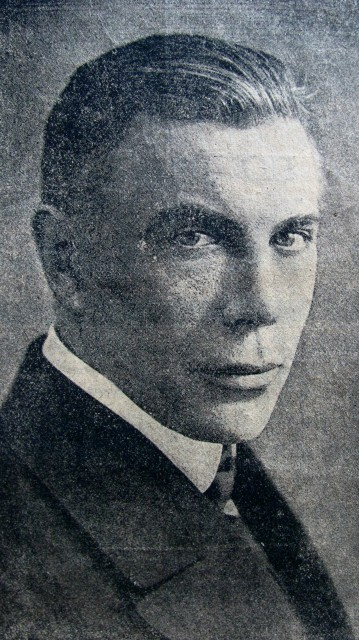
- Born: Pyotr Ivanovich Krasavtsev; 10 February 1873; Simbirsk, Russian Empire
- Died: 14 August 1934 (aged 61); Odessa, Ukrainian SSR, Soviet Union
- Occupations: Film director; screenwriter; actor
- Years active: 1909–1928

Pyotr Ivanovich Chardynin (Russian: Пётр Иванович Чардынин; 10 February [O.S. 29 January] 1873 – 14 August 1934) was a Russian and Soviet film director, screenwriter and actor. One of the pioneers of the film industry in the Russian Empire, Chardynin directed over a hundred silent films during his career.

== Biography ==
Chardynin was born Pyotr Ivanovich Krasavtsev on 10 February 1873 in Simbirsk, Russia (now Ulyanovsk). In 1890, he was admitted to the Drama School of Moscow Philharmonic Society, where he studied under Vladimir Nemirovich-Danchenko from 1891. After graduating, he adopted stage name of Chardynin and started both acting and directing career in provincial Russian theatres in Belgorod, Orekhovo-Zuevo, Uralsk and Vologda.

He first began experimenting with short films in 1907. In 1908, Chardynin joined the troupe at Vvedensky Narodny Dom in Moscow and, as a part of it, started his film acting career in A 16th Century Russian Wedding and Song About the Merchant Kalashnikov. In 1909, Chardynin debuted as a director with The Power of Darkness and soon become the principal director for Aleksandr Khanzhonkov's film company. In 1916, however, facing the serious competition from Yevgeni Bauer, he left the Khanzhonkov and, together with Vera Kholodnaya and several other leading actors, joined Dmitriy Kharitonov's studio in Odesa. There, Chardynin made several successful films including Be Silent, My Sorrow, Be Silent. Being one of the most productive Russian filmmakers, he directed about 120 or 200 films by 1918, mainly specializing on literary adaptations.

From 1920 to 1923, Chardynin lived and worked in Italy, France, Germany and Latvia. In 1923, he returned to the Soviet Union to work at Odessa Film Studio, where he directed several costume dramas and epics about the history of Ukraine. During the early 1930s, Chardynin was banned from directing by Soviet authorities and died in 1934 from liver cancer.

== Personal life ==
One of Chardynin's several marriages was to director Margarita Barskaia (Chardynina), who worked as an assistant director on eleven of his films in the 1920s.

== Filmography ==
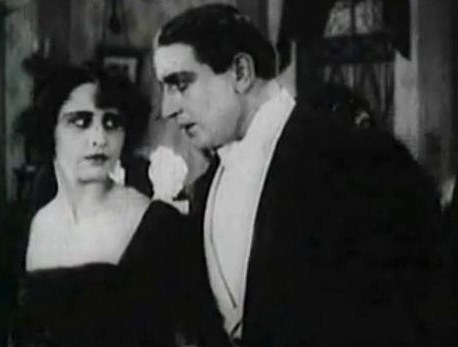
Vera Kholodnaya and Ossip Runitsch in Chardynin's Be Silent, My Sorrow, Be Silent (1918)

- The Power of Darkness (short), 1909
- Dead Souls (short), 1909
- Charodeyka (The Enchantress) (short), 1909
- Boyarin Orsha (short), 1910
- Idiot (short), 1910
- The Queen of Spades (short), 1910
- Vadim (short), 1910
- Na boykom meste, 1911
- The Kreutzer Sonata, 1911
- Rabochaya slobodka (short), 1912
- Voyna i mir (short), 1913
- Uncle's Apartment (co-director), 1913
- 1613 (co-director), 1913
- Obryv, 1913
- The Little House in Kolomna (short), 1913
- V rukakh besposhchadnogo roka (short), 1914
- Ty pomnish' li?, 1914
- Revnost (short), 1914
- Zhenshchina zavtrashevo dnya, 1914
- Sorvanets, 1914
- Chrysanthemums, 1914
- Vlast tmy (short), 1915
- Ubogaya i naryadnaya, 1915
- Komediya smerti (short), 1915
- Katyusha Maslova, 1915
- Hromonozhka, 1915
- Peterburgskiye trushchobi (co-director), 1915
- Natasha Rostova, 1915
- Potop, 1915
- Teni grekha, 1915
- Venetziansky chulok, 1915
- Lyubov statskogo sovetnika, 1915
- Drakonovskiy kontrakt, 1915
- Mirages (short), 1915
- By the Fireplace, 1917
- Forget about the Fireplace, Its Fire is Gone, 1917
- Be Silent, My Sorrow, Be Silent, 1918
- Rasskaz o semi poveshennykh, 1920
- Dubrowsky, der Räuber Ataman (as Peter Tschardin), 1921
- Ukrasia, 1925, based on the "cine-novel" with the same name by Nikolay Borisov
- 1925: Генерал с того света, a time slip lost short film, screenplay by Nikolay Borisov and Vladimir Vajnshtok
- Taras Shevchenko, 1926

== See also ==
- Vera Kholodnaya
- Ossip Runitsch
- Vitold Polonsky
- Vsevolod Meyerhold
