= Ossip Runitsch =

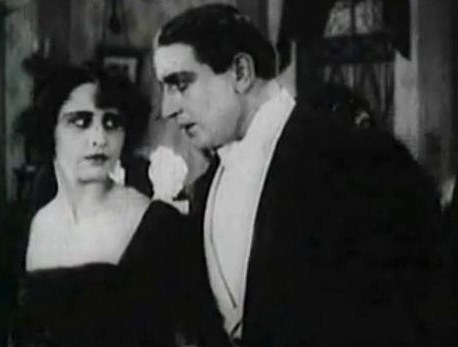
- Vera Kholodnaya and Ossip Runitsch
- Born: Osip Fradkin; 1889; Russian Empire
- Died: 6 April 1947 (aged 57–58); Johannesburg, South Africa
- Other names: Ossip Runitch; Osip Runich; Giuseppe Runitsch
- Occupations: Actor, director, producer
- Years active: 1914–1947
- Spouse: Nina Pavlishcheva (m. 1925)

Ossip Iliych Runitsch (Russian: Осип Ильич Рунич, IPA: [ˈosʲɪp ɨˈlʲjitɕ rʊˈnʲitɕ]; born Osip Fradkin, 1889 – 6 April 1947) was a Russian silent film actor, producer and stage director.

He was one of the biggest stars of Russian silent cinema and one of the first iconic figures of Russian cinematograph. In 1915–1919 he starred in some successful silent films of that time as Molchi, grust... molchi and Posledneiye tango with other film stars such as Vera Kholodnaya, Vitold Polonsky and Pyotr Chardynin.

== Biography ==
Runitsch was a long time admirer of his co-star Kholodnaya and after her death in 1919 during Russian Civil War, he fled Russia and left for Italy where he took part in a number of films. Later, he moved to Germany where he starred together with Emil Jannings and other famous German actors.

In 1925, he married Nina Pavlishcheva, a courtier ballet dancer.

By the late 1930s, he was living in Riga, Latvia, where he played in the troupe of Russian Drama Theatre. Apparently, when he realised that the World War II was inevitable, he accepted an invitation to tour South Africa from his local Jewish friends. He stayed in South Africa and became a founder of one of the first professional theatre companies in a country. He also produced operas for the State Theatre in the mid 1940s.

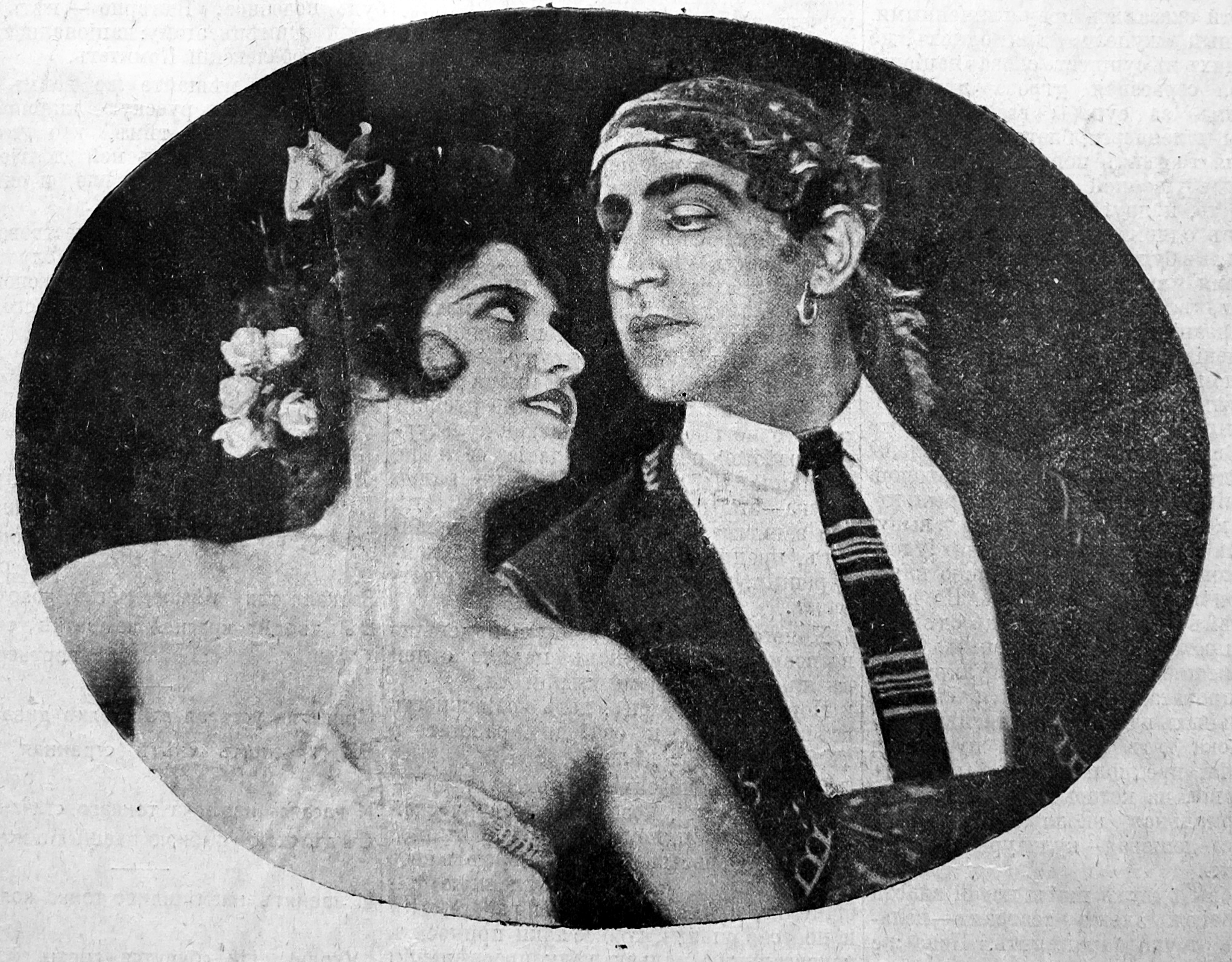
Vera Kholodnaya and Ossip Runitch in the Last Tango (Posledneye Tango), 1918.

== Filmography ==
- Война и Мир (Voyna i mir) (1915) as Nikolai Rostov
- Песнь торжествующей любви (Pesn torzhestvuyushchey lyubvi) (1915)
- Обожженные крылья (Obozhzhenniye krylya) (1915)
- Истерзанные души (Isterzannye dushi) (1917) as Ingenieur Karin
- Человек-зверь (Chelovek - zver) (1917)
- Живой труп (Zhivoy trup) (1918)
- Женщина,которая изобрела любовь (Zhenshchina, kotoraya izobrela lyubov) (1918)
- Молчи, грусть... молчи... (Molchi, grust... molchi) (1918) as Zaritskii, a barrister
- Последнее танго (Posledneiye tango) (1918) as Joe
- Die Bestie im Menschen (1920) as Jacques Lantier
- L'orchidea fatale (1920)
- Lord Bluff (1920)
- La catena (1920)
- L'automobile errante (1921)
- Danton (1921) as Desmoulins
- Playing with Fire (1921)
- Dubrowsky, der Räuber Ataman (1921)
- The Infernal Power (1922)
- Marie Antoinette - Das Leben einer Königin (1922)
- Psicha, die Tänzerin Katherina (1923)
- The Doll Maker of Kiang-Ning (1923)
- Düstere Schatten, strahlendes Glück (1924) as F. C. Morland
- Frühlingsfluten (1924)
- Prater (1924) as Graf Rynon
- The Golden Calf (1925) as Leibgardist
- Diary of a Coquette (1929) as Hoteldirektor Lambert
- Sensation im Wintergarten (1929) as Zirkusdirektor
- Das Donkosakenlied (1930) as Basmanoff

== See also ==
- Aleksandr Khanzhonkov
- Vera Kholodnaya
- Vitold Polonsky
- Igor Ilyinsky
- Emil Jannings
