= Vera Kholodnaya =

Russian actress

- Вера Холодная
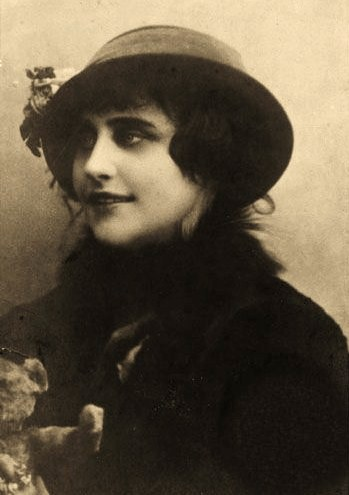
- Born: Vera Vasilyevna Levchenko; 5 August 1893; Poltava, Russian Empire
- Died: 16 February 1919 (aged 25); Odessa, Ukrainian People's Republic
- Occupation: Actress
- Years active: 1914–1918
- Spouse: Vladimir Kholodny (m. 1910)
- Children: 2

Vera Vasilyevna Kholodnaya (née Levchenko; Russian: Вера Васильевна Холодная; Ukrainian: Віра Василівна Холодна; 5 August 1893 – 16 February 1919) was a Russian cinema actress. She was the first star of Imperial Russian silent cinema. Only five of her films still exist, and the total number she acted in is unknown, with speculation ranging from 50 to 100.

She predominantly acted in the genres of drama, melodrama, and short films, working with directors such as Yevgeni Bauer, Pyotr Chardynin, and others. Her co-stars included Vitold Polonsky, Vladimir Maksimov, and Osip Runich.

She gained fame for her roles in films such as The Song of Triumphant Love (1915), Mirages (1915), A Life for a Life (1916), Forget the Fireplace... (1917), and many others. Only five films featuring Vera Kholodnaya have survived, though the actual number of her films may range from 50 to 100. Even after her death at the age of 25, her popularity endured during the Russian Revolution of 1917 and the Civil War. The official cause of her death was Spanish flu, but it sparked numerous rumors and myths.

== Early life ==
Born in Poltava (Russian Empire, now Ukraine), she went to live in Moscow with her widowed grandmother at the age of 2. As a girl, she dreamed of a career in classical ballet and enrolled at the Bolshoi Theatre ballet school. From early childhood. Vera participated in family theatricals. When she was age 10, Vera was sent to the famous Perepelkina's grammar school.

== Personal life ==
At the graduation prom she met Vladimir Kholodny, who was then a student, an editor of a daily sport newspaper and a race-driver, said to be one of the early Russian car racers. They got married in 1910 despite disapproval of both families. Vera often accompanied him in races, which resulted in road accidents. She also adopted his surname, which translates to "the cold one". Later, many took it for a well-chosen pseudonym. Their daughter Evgeniya was born in 1912, and they adopted a girl, Nata, a year later.

== Career rise ==
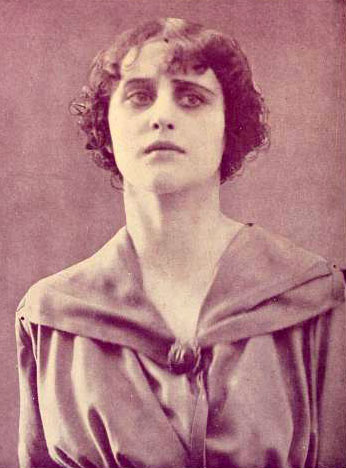
Vera Kholodnaya

In 1908, Vera attended a performance of Francesca da Rimini, with Vera Komissarzhevskaya in the title role. She was deeply impressed with Komissarzhevskaya's artistry and decided to venture in film acting. She approached Vladimir Gardin, a leading Russian film director, who cast her in a minor role in his grand production of Anna Karenina.

In 1915 Yevgeni Bauer was to direct the film Song of Triumphant Love (Pesn Torzhestvuyushchey Lyubvi), a mystical love drama (after Turgenev) and was searching for an actress of outstanding beauty. When Vera Kholodnaya was introduced to Bauer, he at once approved her for the role, being impressed by her beauty.

Song of Triumphant Love was an enormous success and Yevgeni Bauer immediately started shooting his another movie starring Kholodnaya. It was a melodrama Flame of the Sky (Plamya Neba) about guilty love of a young woman married off to an old widower, and his son. Although Flame of the Sky was shot after Song of Triumphant Love, it was the first to go on screen and so brought fame to Vera Kholodnaya.

At first, it was hard for Vera to convey complex psychological nuances, so she imitated the acting of Asta Nielsen and gradually developed her own style. Known for her distinctive costumes and large gray eyes, she became a prominent film actress in Imperial Russia.

Her next picture was The Children of the Age (Deti veka), aired in 1915, a drama with pretensions to revealing social problems.

Tremendous success was Pyotr Chardynin's tragic melodrama The Mirages (1916), followed by the 'fancy drama' Beauty Must Reign in the World by Yevgeni Bauer, melodrama Fiery Devil, and another melodrama A Life for a Life, which turned one of the most popular films in Vera Kholodnaya's career and brought her the title 'the Queen of Screen'. The author of this title was Alexander Vertinsky who venerated the actress and frequented her house. In 1916 Khanzhonkov's company started making the film Pierrot with Vertinsky and Kholodnaya playing the leads. Unfortunately, the film was not completed.

In the beginning of 1917 was released of one of the best films with Vera Kholodnaya, namely By the Fireplace (U kamina), based on a popular romance. The tragic film about a family broken by a rich lover ended with the death of the protagonist played by Vera Kholodnaya. The triumph of the drama exceeded all the films shot in Russia before that. It was so until 1918 when the movie Be Silent, My Sorrow, Be Silent (Molchi, grust, molchi) aired and received even great acceptance. Like many of her films, it was based on a Russian traditional love song. At the same time there was probably no other film so much criticized, especially after the revolution. By the middle of 1918 Vera Kholodnaya turned from just a popular and admired actress into a real phenomenon of the Russian cinema.

Her latest movies were Krasnaya zarya (1918), Zhivoy trup (1918), The Last Tango (1918).

However, only five works with Kholodnaya have been preserved. The Children of the Age was the earliest of them. The other four extant films are: The Mirages (1916), A Life for a Life (1916), A Corpse Living (1918), and Be Silent, My Sorrow, Be Silent (1918).

A Life for a Life was the film that definitively established Kholodnaya's star status.

== World War I and the Russian Revolution ==
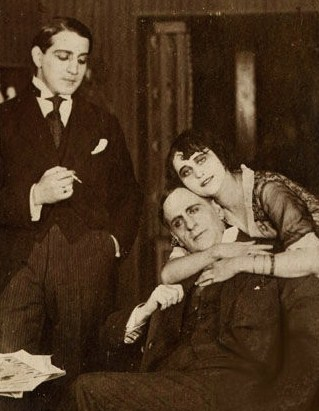
Ossip Runitsch, Ivan Khudoleev and Vera Kholodnaya

After her husband was drafted to fight in World War I, Kholodnaya signed with a rival Khanzhonkov studio.

During World War I, Kholodnaya took part in charity concerts, selling gifts to support soldiers and their families. Soldiers worshipped Kholodnaya, calling her "our Verochka". In breaks between shooting sessions, Kholodnaya travelled to the front to visit her husband.

By the time of the Russian Revolution, a new Kholodnaya film was released every third week. At the Fire Side (1917) was her massive commercial success: the movie was run in cinemas until 1924, when the Soviet authorities ordered many of the Kholodnaya features destroyed. At the Fire Side was a drama based on a love triangle. The film's success prompted its director Petr Chardynin to make a sequel, Forget about the Fire, the Flame's Gone Out (1917), which was released during the October revolution. Forget about the Fire, together with another film, Be Silent, My Sorrow, Be Silent (1918) – both with a circus theme – broke all commercial records for Russian pre-revolutionary cinema.

During the Russian Civil War, the Bolshevik authorities requested film companies to produce less melodrama and more adaptations of classics. Accordingly, Kholodnaya was cast in a screen version of Tolstoy's The Living Corpse. Her acting abilities in this film were applauded by Konstantin Stanislavski, who welcomed Vera to join the troupe of the Moscow Art Theatre.

By this time, the actress had determined to move with her film company to Odessa, where she died at the age of 25 in the 1918 flu pandemic. On learning about her death, Alexander Vertinsky, wrote one of his most poignant songs, "Your fingers smell of church incense, and your lashes sleep in grief..." A director with whom she had worked for several years filmed her large funeral. Ironically, this seems to be her best known film today.

== Circumstances of her death ==
Official Russian records state that Vera Kholodnaya died of the Spanish flu during the pandemic of 1919. While that seems quite likely, there is much speculation around her death. Other stories claim she was poisoned by the French ambassador with whom she reportedly had an affair and who believed that she was a spy for the Bolsheviks.

During her funeral in Odesa, a large number of people gathered to pay their final respects to Kholodnaya. She was buried on February 19 at the First Christian Cemetery of Odesa. In 1937, the cemetery was demolished by the Communist authorities. In its place, the "Park of Ilyich" with amusement attractions was established, and part of the territory was transferred to the local zoo. Today, only a few reburials from the old cemetery are known with certainty, and there is no confirmed information regarding the reburial of Kholodnaya.

Vladimir Kholodnyy lived only a few months and died of typhus.

Many people refused to believe that the great actress had died. Others were shocked by her skin, which had turned bluish due to the embalming fluid. The star’s death gave rise to numerous rumors and a host of legends. According to one version, she was executed as a French spy; another claimed she suffocated from the scent of poisoned white lilies allegedly sent by French consul Enno; a third suggested that Kholodnaya was strangled by a jealous lover. The rumors intensified after the arrest and execution of Kholodnaya’s husband, but her family and close friends confirmed the official cause of death—Spanish flu.

There were also whispers that the doctor had been blackmailed into signing off on the Spanish flu diagnosis. Some even claimed that the woman buried was not Vera Kholodnaya at all, but an unknown woman, and that the actress had faked her death and fled abroad due to the threat of her secret mission being exposed. Another rumor alleged she had been kidnapped because she was wearing a large amount of jewelry. No evidence has ever been found to support any of these theories.

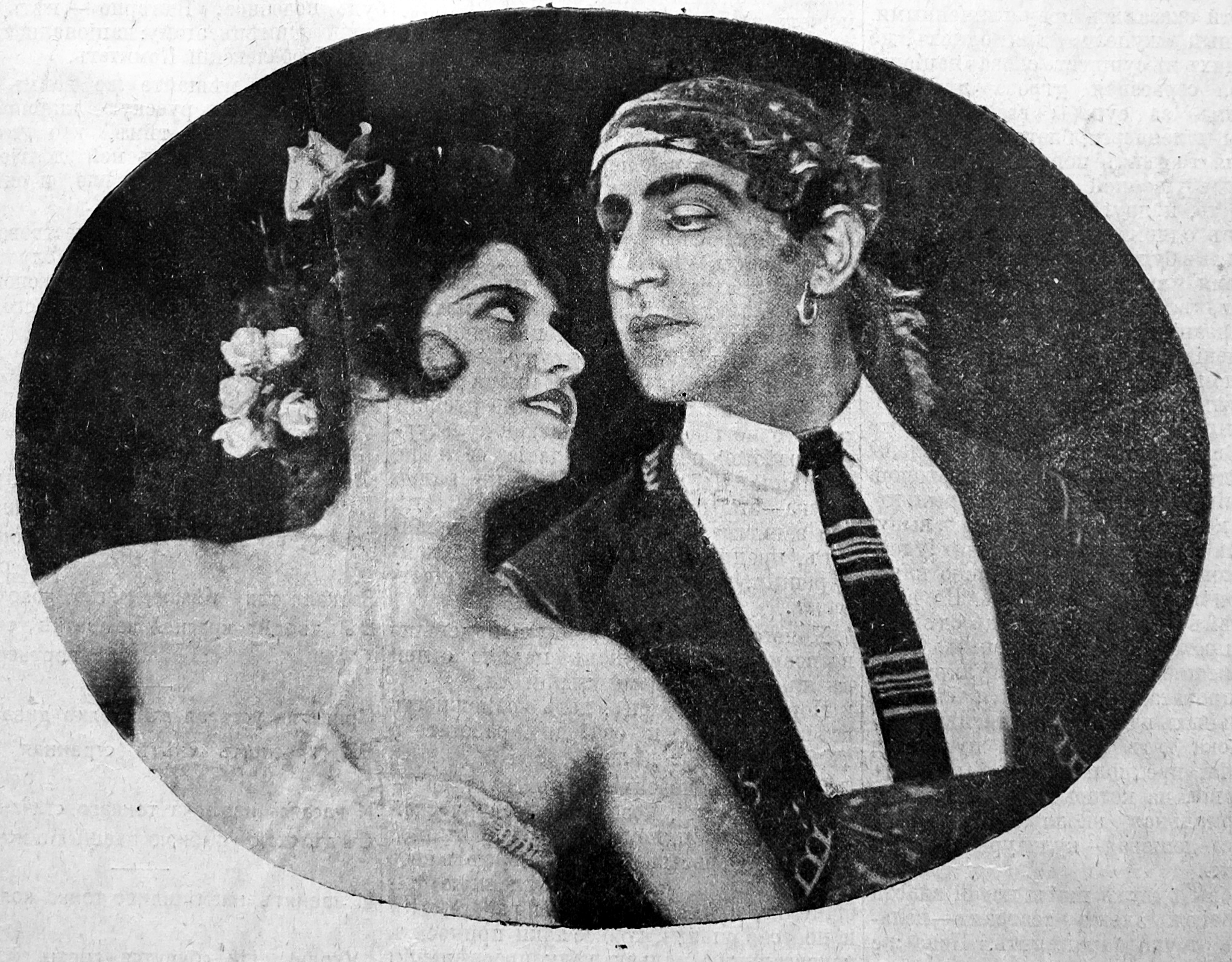
Vera Kholodnaya and Ossip Runitch in The Last Tango, 1918

== Legacy ==
Her life was dramatised in Nikita Mikhalkov's film A Slave of Love (1976). A documentary on her life was filmed in 1992. A year later, her image was depicted on a postage stamp and in 2003 a life-size bronze statue of her was erected in Odessa, created by the artist Alexander P. Tokarev.

- Director Vadim Tsalikov created a documentary film titled Farewell Beauty, dedicated to the actress.
- A feature film inspired by the life and film career of Vera Kholodnaya, A Slave of Love (1975), was directed by Nikita Mikhalkov. The lead role was played by Elena Solovey, who later emigrated to the United States.
- In February 1996, a small square at the corner of Bunin and Preobrazhenskaya Streets in Odesa was renamed in honor of Vera Kholodnaya.
- In 2003, a monument was erected near the house in Odesa where the actress lived and died.
- In 2010, Odesa hosted the silent film and contemporary music festival Silent Nights, with one of the sets dedicated to Vera Kholodnaya.
- In 2017, Yulia Sak created a short artistic film dedicated to Vera Kholodnaya, titled Elegy of Love: Vera Kholodnaya.
- In 2022, Marshal Rokossovsky Street in the city of Kremenchuk was renamed Vera Kholodnaya Street as part of the de-Russification process.

== Filmography ==
Only eight of Kholodnaya's films have survived, in part or in whole:

Year	Title
1914	Anna Karenina
1915	Children of the Age
1916	Mirages
1916	A Life for a Life
1917	Tormented Souls (Izterzannye dushi)
1918	Be Silent, My Sorrow, Be Silent
1918	Skazka liubvi dorogoi
1918	The Last Tango

=== Lost films ===
Year	Title
1915	Vaniushin's Children (Deti Vaniushina)
1915	Flame of the Sky (Plamia neba)
1915	Song of Triumphant Love (Pesn' torzhestvuiushchei liubvi)
1915	Nakazannyi Antosha
1915	Probuzhdenie
1916	Beauty Must Rule the World (V mir dolzhna tsarit' krasota)
1916	Odna iz mnogikh
1916	Lunnaia krasavitsa
1916	Shakhmaty zhizni
1916	Razorvannye tsepi
1917	Stolichnyi iad
1917	Radi schast'ia
1917	Pytka molchaniia
1917	By the Fireplace
1917	Forget about the Fireplace, Its Fire is Gone
1917	Izterzannye dushi
1917	Pochemu ia bezumno liubliu
1917	Kak oni lgut
1917	Na altar' krasoty
1917	Toboi kaznennye
1917	Bluzhdaiushchie ogni
1917	Pozabud' pro kamin, v nem pogasli ogni
1917	Chelovek-zver'
1918	Zhivoi trup
1918	Ternistyi slavy put'
1918	The Woman who Invented Love (Zhenshchina, kotoraia izobrela liubov')
1918	Meshchanskaia tragediia
1919	Azra
1919	Krasnaia zaria
1919	V tiskakh liubvi
1919	Pesn' Persii
1919	Kira Zubova

=== Films that were never released ===
Year	Title
1918	Kniazhna Tarakanova
1918	Ispoved' monakhini
1919	Tsyganka Aza
1919	Dama s kameliiami

== See also ==
- Vsevolod Meyerhold
- Vitold Polonsky
- Ossip Runitsch
