= Vitold Polonsky =

Russian actor

Vitold Alfonsovich Polonsky (Витольд Альфонсович Полонский)
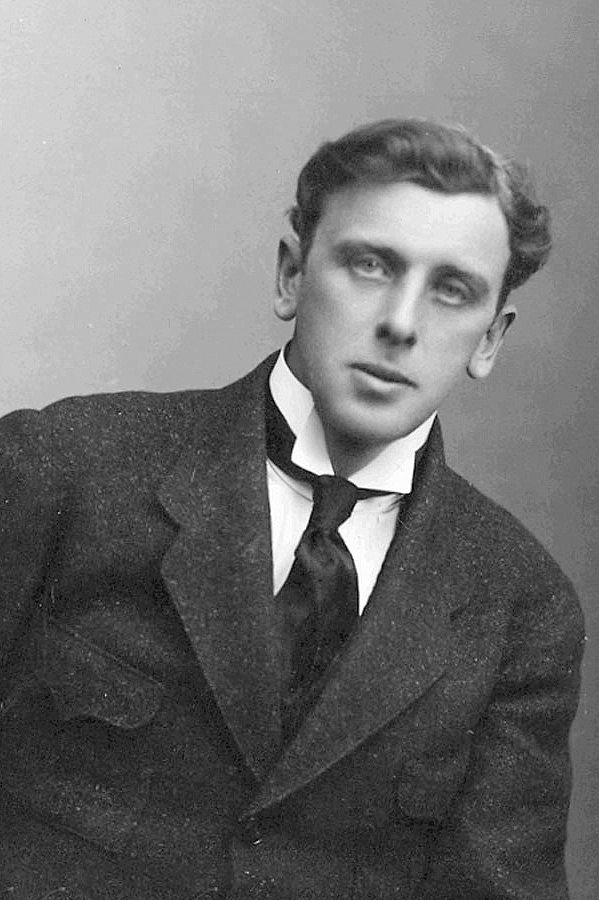
- Born: 1879; Moscow, Russian Empire
- Died: 5 January 1919 (aged 39); Odessa, Ukrainian People's Republic
- Occupation: Actor
- Years active: 1907–1919
- Spouse(s): Vera Pashennaya (divorced); Olga Gladkova
- Children: 2

Vitold Alfonsovich Polonsky (Russian: Витольд Альфонсович Полонский; 1879 – 5 January 1919) was a Russian silent film actor.

== Biography ==
The son of a nobleman, Polonsky took drama courses in the Moscow theatre school, graduating in 1907.

He acted in the Maly Theatre (Moscow) until 1916. He was one of the most popular actors in pre-Revolutionary Russian cinema. His first role was that of Prince Andrey Bolkonsky in the 1915 film Natasha Rostova. He played several hero-lover roles including Boris in The Brothers Boris and Gleb; Boris in Irina Kirsanova; Evgeny in The Song of Tumultuous Love; Andrey Bargov in After Death; Vladislav Zaritsky in Shadows of Sin (all 1915); Prince Baratynsky in A Life for a Life (1916); Lanin in By The Fireplace (1917) and Prince Mirsky in Evening Sacrifice.

Polonsky was married twice. His first wife was the Maly Theatre actress Vera Nikolaevna Pashennaya (1887–1962), who became a National Artist of the USSR, a State Laureate and Lenin Prize winner. They had one daughter, Irina Polonskaya.

His second wife was Maly Theatre actress Olga Gladkova. They had one daughter, Veronika Polonskaya, who also became an actress.

In the summer of 1918, the film director Pyotr Chardynin and the Moscow cinema entrepreneur Dmitry Kharitonov requested the State Commissar for Education, Lunacharsky, to aid a group of cinema workers to travel to Odessa to film. They received a permit, and the group travelled to Odessa. Polonsky was part of the group along with Vera Kholodnaya and Ivan Mozzukhin. In November 1918, however, Odessa was occupied by the Entente forces. A few months later, in January 1919, Polonsky died from food poisoning.

== Filmography ==
- Molchi, grust... molchi (short) as Telepnev, a rich gentleman (1918)
- Bal gospoden (1918)
- Bog mesti (1918)
- Pesn lyubvi nedopetaya (1918)
- Umirayushchii lebed as Viktor Krasovsky (1917)
- Idi za mnoi (1917)
- U kamina as Lanin (1917)
- Zhizn za zhizn as Prince Vladimir Bartinsky (1916)
- Koroleva ekrana (1916)
- Mirazhi (short) as Dymov Jr. (1916)
- Schastye vechnoy nochi as Vadim (1915)
- Obozhzhenniye krylya (1915)
- Pesn torzhestvuyushchey lyubvi (1915)
- Teni grekha (1915)
- Natasha Rostova (1915)
- Posle smerti as Andrei Bagrov (1915)

== See also ==
- Ossip Runitsch
- Vera Kholodnaya
- Pyotr Chardynin
- Aleksandr Khanzhonkov
