= Film studios of the Russian Empire =

The Khanzhonkov Trading House was established in Moscow in 1906 by Aleksandr Khanzhonkov under the name Э. Ош и А. Ханжонков, later renamed to А. Ханжонков и К° (A. Khanzhonkov & Co) for doing business in cinema. Эмиль Ош, Emil Osh, 'Émile Auché' was a clerk from Pathé, who promised to arrange financing (but failed). Khanzhonkov's first films were shot in 1909.

The Russian office of the French film company Pathé in Moscow shot several films about Russia during 1908-1913.

The Drankov Trading House was established in 1907 by Alexander Drankov, with first films (documentaries) released in 1908.

The Thiemann & Reinhardt trading house (P. Thiemann, F. Reinhardt, and S. Osipov (Russian: П. Тиман, Ф. Рейнгардт и С. Осипов)) was established in Moscow in 1909 by film entrepreneur Paul Thiemann with the partnership of the tobacco businessman F. Reinhardt. It bought the Gloria film company. In 1915 it suffered from anti-German pogroms due to World War I. The same year Thiemann, being an ethnic German was deported to Ufa and soon the company was closed.

The Minotaur Film Factory was established in St. Petersburg in 1909 by Александр Дмитриевич Мин.

The Yermolyev Partnership was established in Moscow in 1915 by Joseph N. Ermolieff (Russian: Иосиф Николаевич Ермольев, romanized: Iosif Nikolayevich Yermolyev, 1889–1962).

The Rus Trading House was established in Moscow in 1915 by a merchant Mikhail Trofimov. By 1924 the main shareholder of the studio was Workers International Relief (known as Mezhrabpom in Soviet Russian and in 1924 Rus and Mezhrabpom's film studio merged into Mezhrabpom-Rus. In 1928, the company was known as Mezhrabpomfilm (1928-1936).

The Kharitonov Trading House of cinema entrepreneur Dmitry Kharitonov, who cooperated wints several Russian film studio, established its own first film studio in 1916, in Moscow.
