= Aleksandr Khanzhonkov =

Russian filmmaker

- Александр Ханжонков
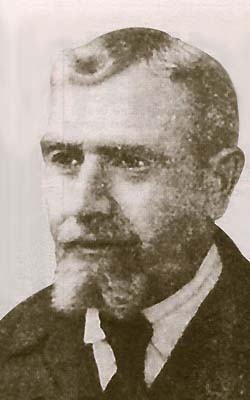
- Born: 8 August 1877; Khanzhonkovka, Don Host Oblast, Russian Empire
- Died: 26 September 1945 (aged 68); Yalta, Crimean Oblast, Soviet Union
- Occupations: Film producer; film director
- Years active: 1905–1926

Aleksandr Alekseevich Khanzhonkov (Russian: Александр Алексеевич Ханжонков, IPA: [ɐlʲɪˈksandr ɐlʲɪˈksʲejɪvʲɪtɕ xənˈʐonkəf]; 8 August [O.S. 27 July] 1877 — 26 September 1945) was a pioneering Russian cinema entrepreneur, film director and screenwriter. He is known for producing Defence of Sevastopol, Russia's first feature film, as well as Ladislas Starevich's ground-breaking stop motion animation. Most of his career was in Russian Empire. During 1923-1926 he worked in the Soviet Union, where his career ended with a financial scandal, however his past achievements earned him a personal pension and an apartment from the state.

== Early years ==
Khanzhonkov was born in the small village of Khanzhonkova (modern-day Nizhnyaya Krynka, Donetsk Oblast) into a noble family of Don Cossacks. His father Alexei Petrovich Khanzhonkov was a landlord who went bankrupt. His mother Paraskeva Sergeevna Khanzhonkova (née Dmitrieva) came from a colonel's family who owned a Singer shop in Moscow. The noble title was first granted to Aleksandr's great-grandfather Vasily Khanzhonkov.

He studied in the Novocherkassk Cossack School and was sent to serve in the Moscow host after his graduation in 1886. He took part in the Russo-Japanese War which undermined his health. In 1905, upon a discharge from military training due to health issues, Khanzhonkov sat in on a screening of Train Pulling into a Station by the Lumiere Brothers.

== Career ==
In 1906 Khanzhonkov founded Russia's first cinema factory, A. Khanzhonkov and Co., whose main financial backer was Ivan Ozerov, an influential banker and member of the Russian State Council. Initial productions were shot on stage in the vein of Méliès and were overshadowed by the work of Alexander Drankov. Known for his unabashed commercialism, Drankov would remain a competitor up to the revolution of 1917.

It wasn't until 1911 that Khanzhonkov's factory would receive widespread acclaim with the release of Defence of Sevastopol. One of the earliest full length Russian feature films, it was equally notable for its technical aspects. By the end of 1912, Khanzhonkov had established a permanent studio in Moscow and went on to produce over a hundred films over the course of the next several years. Much of Khanzhonkov's work during this time period went "virtually unseen by the Russian masses" and often took aim at aristocratic sensibilities or adapted great Russian novels of the 19th century. Nonetheless, Khanzhonov helped create many standards in Russian cinema production; the first confirmed use of artificial light in the Russian film industry takes place in a Khanzhonkov documentary piece.

During the Russian Revolution, Khanzhonkov fled Russia to Constantinople and Vienna, and, despite previous affiliation with the royal family, returned upon invitation to the USSR in 1923 and was appointed director of the new Soviet studio Proletkino and later as a production consultant for Goskino. His career in the Soviet Union ended in 1926: he was forced to abdicate after a corruption scandal struck Proletkino, and never worked in cinema again. Khanzhonkov spent the rest of his life in Yalta, living on a personal pension from the state. There he survived the Nazi occupation of Crimea in 1941–1944, and died in Yalta after many years of declining health on September 26, 1945.

== Legacy ==
- Monument to Aleksandr Khanzhonkov

== Bibliography ==
- Aleksandr Khanzhonkov (1937). First Years of Russian Cinema. Memoirs. — Moscow/Leningrad: Iskusstvo // Moscow: Karamzin, 254 pages ISBN 978-5-00071-404-1
- M. Kuznetsova. Aleksandr Khanzhonkov: Life Behind the Frame article from Profile magazine № 29, 1997 ISSN 1726-0639
- Rashit Yangirov. An addition to A. A. Khanzhonkov's biography: New angle article from Cinema Historian's Notes magazine № 55, 2011 ISSN 0235-8212
- Tetiana Avdashkova. Ukrainian Cossack that made it in Hollywood article from The Day newspaper № 43, 9 August 2012

== See also ==
- Vera Kholodnaya
- Ossip Runitsch
- Vitold Polonsky
