= Minor (surname) =

Minor is a surname shared by several notable people:

== A ==
- Anne Rogers Minor (1864–1947), American clubwoman

== B ==
- Barbara Haviland Minor, American chemical engineer
- Benjamin Blake Minor (1818–1905), American lawyer and academic
- Bill Minor (1922–2017), American journalist
- Billy Minor (born 1970), American football player
- Blas Minor (born 1966), American baseball player
- Brandon Minor (born 1988), American football player
- Brienne Minor (born 1997), American tennis player
- B. Pagels-Minor (born 1985), American business consultant and activist

== C ==
- Charles Minor (educator) (1835–1903), American academic
- Charles Minor (Arkansas politician) (1841–1881), American lawyer and politician from Arkansas
- Charles A. Minor (born 1942), Liberian diplomat
- Claudie Minor (born 1951), American football player
- Clorinda S. Minor (1806–1855), American settler in Palestine

== D ==
- Damon Minor (born 1974), American baseball player and coach
- Dan Minor (1909–1982), American jazz musician
- Dave Minor (1922–1998), American basketball player
- Deon Minor (born 1973), American track and field athlete

== E ==
- Edward S. Minor (1840–1924), American politician from Wisconsin
- Ethel Minor, American civil rights activist

== F ==
- Flor Minor (born 1961), Mexican sculptor
- Florence Minor (1949–2024), American writer and film editor
- Francis Minor (1820–1892), American lawyer and suffragist, husband of Virginia Minor
- Fred Hawthorne Minor (1888–1976), American politician and lawyer

== G ==
- George Minor (1845–1904), American naval officer and composer
- George Minor (baseball) (1919–1973), American baseball player
- Gerry Minor (born 1958), Canadian ice hockey player
- Grace Minor (born 1942), Liberian politician
- Greg Minor (born 1971), American basketball player
- Gregory Minor (died 1999), American engineer and activist

== H ==
- Halsey Minor (born 1964), American businessman
- Harold B. Minor (1902–1984), American diplomat
- Harry Minor (1928–2017), American baseball player and manager
- Henry Minor (1783–1839), American judge

== I ==
- Ilka Minor (born 1975), Austrian rally co-driver
- Inge Minor (born 1929), German figure skater

== J ==
- Jacqueline Minor, British European Commission official
- Jakob Minor (1855–1912), Austrian literary historian
- James T. Minor, American sociologist and academic administrator
- Jane Minor (c.1792–1858), African-American healer and slave emancipator
- Janet E. Minor, Canadian barrister
- Jason Temujin Minor (born 1971), American comic book artist
- Jerry Minor, American actor and comedian
- John Minor (politician) (1761–1816), American lawyer and politician from Virginia
- John B. Minor (1813–1895), American jurist and academic
- Jordan Minor (born 2000), American basketball player
- José Pablo Minor, Mexican actor, TV host and model

== K ==
- Keija Minor (born 1972), American lawyer and magazine editor
- Kobee Minor (born 2002), American football player
- Kory Minor (born 1976), American football player
- Kyle Minor (born 1976), American writer

== L ==
- Lazar Solomonovich Minor (1855–1942), Russian neurologist
- Lewis J. Minor (1914–2002), American chef and businessman
- Lloyd B. Minor (born 1957), American surgeon and academic

== M ==
- Mark Minor (born 1950), American basketball player
- Melissa Minor-Brown (born 1984), American politician from Delaware
- Michael Minor (1940–1987), American illustrator and art director
- Mike Minor (actor) (1940–2016), American actor
- Mike Minor (baseball) (born 1987), American baseball player
- Mike Minor (snowboarder) (born 1990), American Paralympic snowboarder

== N ==
- Nannie Jacquelin Minor (1871–1934), American public health nurse

== O ==
- Osip Minor (1861–1932), Russian revolutionary

== P ==
- Pauline Oberdorfer Minor (c.1885–1963), American singer

== R ==
- Raleigh Colston Minor (1869–1923), American legal scholar
- Rickey Minor (born 1957), American bassist and composer
- Robert Minor (1884–1952), American cartoonist
- Robert Crannell Minor (1839–1904), American artist
- Robert Lee Minor (born 1944), American stuntman and actor
- Ross Minor (born 1998), American accessibility content creator
- Rüdiger Rainer Minor (1939–2017), German bishop of the United Methodist Church
- Ryan Minor (1974–2023), American baseball player

== S ==
- Shane Minor (born 1968), American singer-songwriter
- Shanika Minor (born 1991), American criminal
- Sheila Minor (born 1946/7), American environmental technician
- Sheri Minor, American politician from New Hampshire
- Solomon Zalkind Minor (1826/7–1900), Lithuanian-Russian rabbi and writer
- Stephen Minor (1760–1815), American governor and banker

== T ==
- Ted Minor (born 1974), American stock racing driver
- Thomas Minor (1608–1690), Early New England settler
- Thomas T. Minor (1844–1889), American politician in Washington State
- Travis Minor (born 1979), American football player

== V ==
- Vic Minor (born 1958), American football player
- Virginia Minor (1824–1894), American suffragist

== W ==
- Wesley Lyng Minor (1851–1935), American architect
- William Chester Minor (1834–1920), American surgeon and lexicographer
- William J. Minor (1808–1869), American enslaver and banker
- William T. Minor (1815–1889), American judge and politician from Connecticut
- William Minor (poet) (born 1969), American poet
- Wilma Frances Minor, American writer and literary forger
- Wladek Minor (born 1946), Polish-American structural biologist

== See also ==
- Audax Minor (1887–1979), pen name of Canadian writer George F. T. Ryall
- Miner (surname)
