= Minor =

Minor may refer to:

== Common meanings ==
- Minor (law), a person under the age of certain legal activities.
- Academic minor, a secondary field of study in undergraduate education

== Mathematics ==
- Minor (graph theory), a relation of one graph to another
- Minor (matroid theory), a relation of one matroid to another
- Minor (linear algebra), the determinant of a square submatrix

== Music ==
- Minor chord
- Minor interval
- Minor key
- Minor scale
- Minor (EP), extended play by Gracie Abrams

== People ==
- Minor (given name), a masculine given name
- Minor (surname), a surname

== Places in the United States ==
- Minor, Alabama, a census-designated place
- Minor, Virginia, an unincorporated community
- Minor Creek (California)
- Minor Creek (Missouri)
- Minor Glacier, Wyoming

== Sports ==
- Minor, a grade in Gaelic games; also, a person who qualifies to play in that grade
- Minor league, a sports league not regarded as a premier league
  - Minor League Baseball or "the minors", the North American professional baseball leagues affiliated to but below Major League Baseball
- Minor penalty in ice hockey

== Vehicles ==
- Morris Minor, a British automobile brand
- Jawa Minor, a Czech automobile introduced 1937
- Aero Minor, a Czech automobile from Jawa Motors, 1946–1952

== Other uses ==
- Minor, a chocolate brand owned by Maestrani
- Minor Hotels, a Thailand-based multinational hotel chain, a subsidiary of Minor International
- Minor International, a Thailand-based multinational restaurant, hotel and retail company
- Minor suit or minors in contract bridge, namely clubs and diamonds
- The Minor (Foote play), 1760
- The Minor (Fonvizin play), 1782
- Minor Theater in Arcata, California, United States
- Minor v. Happersett, a case appealed to the US Supreme Court concerning the right to vote
