= Charles Minor =

Charles Minor may refer to:

- Charles Minor (educator) (1835–1903)), president of the Maryland Agricultural College, and of the Virginia Agricultural and Mechanical College
- Charles A. Minor (born 1942), Liberian ambassador to the United States
- Charles Minor (Arkansas politician) (1841–1881), member of the Arkansas House of Representatives

== See also ==
- Charles Miner (disambiguation)
