= Miner (disambiguation) =

A miner is the principal occupation in mining of mineral resources.

Miner may also refer to:

== Biology ==
- Miner, Australian birds of the genus Manorina in the honeyeater family
- Miner, South American birds of the genus Geositta in the ovenbird family
- Leaf miner, the larva of an insect that lives in and eats the leaf tissue of plants

== Places ==
- Miner, Missouri, a city in Missouri, US
- Miner County, South Dakota, US

== Arts and entertainment ==
- The Miner, a novel by the Japanese author Natsume Sōseki
- The Miner (film), a 2017 film
- Miners (poem), a poem by Wilfred Owen
- The Miner, an abbreviated name for the Arizona Miner

== People with the surname ==
- Miner (surname)

== Other uses ==
- Ballarat Miners, Australian basketball team
- Kongsberg Miners, Norwegian basketball team
- Mining (military), an occupation in tunnel warfare
- UTEP Miners and Lady Miners, the Athletics teams representing the University of Texas at El Paso
- George Miner Elementary School, US
- Miner, an entity that performs cryptocurrency mining, for example bitcoin mining

== Distinguish from ==
- Minor (disambiguation)
- Myna, a bird of the starling family (Sturnidae)
