= Miner (surname) =

Miner is a surname, and may refer to:

== A ==
- Ahiman Louis Miner (1804–1886), American politician from Vermont
- AC Miner (Alexis Ciarra Lopez Miner; born 2003), Filipino volleyball player
- Allen H. Miner (1917–2004), American television director and screenwriter
- Allison Miner (1949–1995), American music manager
- Alonzo Ames Miner (1814–1895), American universalist and university president
- Asher Miner (1860–1924), American businessman and military officer

== B ==
- Bill Miner (1846–1913), American bandit
- Bob Miner (1941–1994), American businessman
- Brian Miner (born 1981), American comedian

== C ==
- Charles Miner (1780–1865), American abolitionist and politician
- Charles Abbott Miner (1830–1903), American industrialist and politician from Pennsylvania
- Charles Wright Miner (1840–1928), United States Army general
- Charles W. Miner (1866–1912), American photographer
- Craig Miner, American politician from Connecticut
- Cyrus Miner (1827–1899), American businessman and politician from Wisconsin

== D ==
- David Miner (musician) (born 1945), American singer
- David Miner (television producer) (born 1969), American television producer
- David Manly Miner (born 1937), Canadian farmer and politician from Saskatchewan
- David M. Miner (born 1962), American politician from North Carolina
- Doris Miner (born 1936), American politician from South Dakota
- Dorothy Miner (historian) (1904–1973), American art historian
- Dorothy Miner (attorney) (1936–2008), American lawyer
- Dwight C. Miner (1904–1978), American historian and academic
- Dylan Miner (born 1976, American printmaker and academic

== E ==
- Earl Miner (1927–2004), American orientalist and academic
- Eliphalet S. Miner (1818–1890), American politician merchant and politician from Wisconsin
- Eliza Gratia Campbell Miner (1805–1891), American artist
- Eunice Thomas Miner (1899–1993), American administrator and advocate for science

== H ==
- Harold Miner (born 1971), American basketball player
- Harry Miner (1891–1918), Canadian soldier, posthumous Victoria Cross
- Hazel Miner (1904–1920), American blizzard victim
- Henry C. Miner (1842–1900), American impresario and politician from New York State
- Horace Mitchell Miner (1912–1993), American anthropologist

== J ==
- Jack Miner (1865–1944), Canadian conservationist
- James Harvey Miner (1830–1913), American lawyer and politician from Wisconsin
- Jan Miner (1917–2004), American actress
- Jay Miner (1932–1994), American chip designer
- John Miner (attorney) (1918–2011), American prosecutor
- John Miner (ice hockey) (born 1965), Canadian ice hockey player
- John Miner (musician), American rock and jazz guitarist
- John B. Minor (1813–1895), American jurist and academic
- John O. Miner (1910–1999), United States Navy officer
- Josef Miner (1914–1944, German boxer
- Julius Howard Miner (1896–1963), American judge from Illinois
- J. R. Miner (Wilbert Miner; 1926–1990), American baseball coach and manager

== K ==
- Kate Miner (actress), American actress, model and musician
- Kate Miner (musician), American singer and songwriter

== L ==
- Laurence Miner, American politicia from New Hampshire
- Leigh Richmond Miner (1864–1935), American photographer
- Loring Miner (1860–1935), American physician
- Luella Miner (1861–1935), American educator and missionary in China

== M ==
- Margaret Miner (1938–2024), American writer and environmentalist
- Matt Miner, American comic writer and activist
- Mary Anne Fackelman-Miner (born c.1947), American photojournalist
- Myrtilla Miner (1815–1864), American educator and abolitionist

== P ==
- Pablo Gamboa Miner (born 1986), Mexican politician
- Patti Miner (born 1955), American singer and songwriter
- Paul Miner (born 1976), American musician
- Phineas Miner (1777–1839), American politician from Connecticut

== R ==
- Rachel Miner (born 1980), American actress
- Ray Miner (1897–1963), American baseball player
- Rich Miner (born 1964), American businessman
- Rick Miner, Canadian educator and college president
- Robert G. Miner (1911–1990), American diplomat
- Roger Miner (1934–2012), American judge
- Ross Miner (born 1991), American figure skater and coach
- Roy Waldo Miner (1875–1955), American marine biologist
- Russ Miner, American politician from Montana

== S ==
- Sara Isadore Sutherland Miner, maiden name of Pauline Periwinkle, American journalist
- Stephanie Miner (born 1970), American politician and attorney from New York State
- Steve Miner (born 1951), American film and television director

== T ==
- Tim Miner, American songwriter
- Tom Miner (1932–1988), American football player
- Trent Miner (born 2001), Canadian ice hockey player

== V ==
- Valerie Miner (born 1947), American novelist

== W ==
- Wayne Miner (died 1918), American soldier
- William H. Miner (c.1862–1930), American entrepreneur
- Worthington Miner (1900–1982), American actor

== Z ==
- Zach Miner (born 1982), American baseball player

== See also ==
- Mina (surname)
- Minor (surname)
