= Charles Miner (disambiguation) =

Charles Miner (1780–1865) was an American politician, member of the U.S. House of Representatives from Pennsylvania.

Charles Miner may also refer to:

- Charles Abbott Miner (1830–1903), American politician, member of the Pennsylvania House of Representatives
- Charles W. Miner (1866–1912), American photographer
- Charles Wright Miner (1840–1928), US Army brigadier general
- Charles Miner, a fictional character in the American television series The Office
