= Solomon Zalkind Minor =

Lithuanian-Russian rabbi and writer (1826/7–1900)

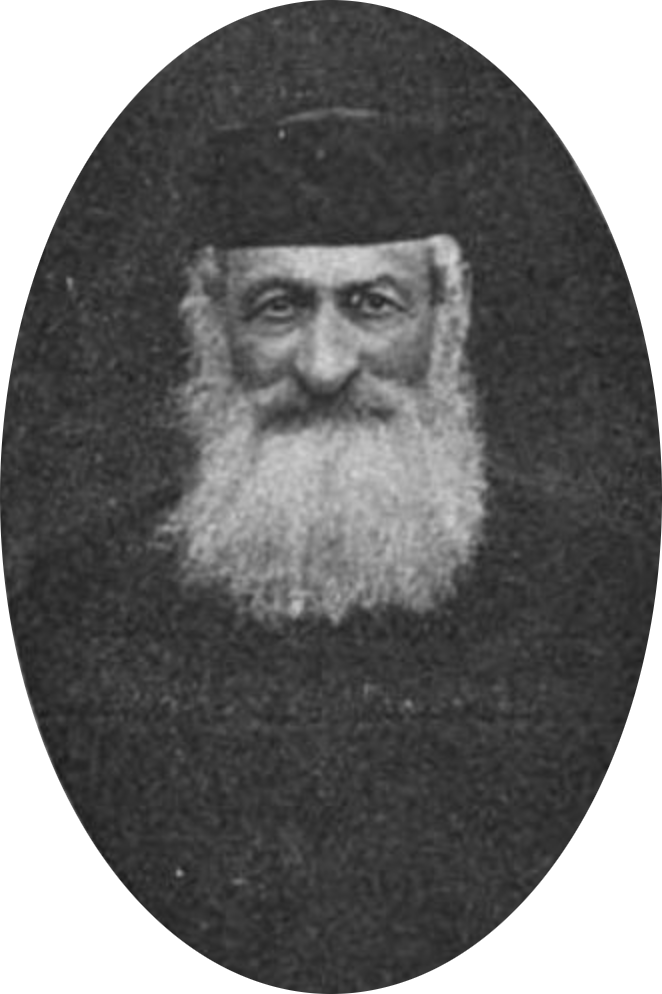
- Born: 1826 or 1827; Vilna, Vilna Governorate, Russian Empire
- Died: January 21, 1900; Vilna, Vilna Governorate, Russian Empire
- Education: Vilna Rabbinical School
- Children: Osip Minor; Lazar Minor
- Writing career
- Pen name: Remez

Solomon Zalkind Minor (Hebrew: שלמה זלקינד מינאר; 1826 or 1827 – January 21, 1900) was a Lithuanian-Russian rabbi and writer.

== Biography ==
Minor was born in Vilna in 1827. He received his elementary education from his father, Jekuthiel, a well-known Talmudist. At the age of twelve Minor took up the study of Biblical and rabbinical subjects, but without the aid of a teacher. In 1849 the Vilna Rabbinical School was established, and Minor was one of its first two graduates.

In 1854, he became instructor in Talmud and rabbinical literature in that institution, and, in 1856, was appointed special adviser on Jewish affairs in the office of the governor-general of Vilna. In 1859 Minor was appointed rabbi at Minsk. Owing to his efforts a Hebrew school and a night school for artisans were opened (1861), and a library for the Jewish community was established (1862).

In 1869, Minor was called to Moscow, where a Jewish congregation had recently been formed. There he succeeded in obtaining from the government the right to establish an independent Jewish religious organization, a right which the community of Moscow had, till then, never enjoyed. At the same time he received permission to build a synagogue and other communal institutions, such as a Hebrew free school, an industrial school, and an orphan asylum. He also taught the Jewish religion at the high school for girls. In 1891, when the expulsion of Moscow Jews began, Minor was banished by governor-general Sergei Alexandrovich to his native town, Vilna, where he remained in seclusion until his death.

Minor wrote articles for the Russian supplement to Ha-Karmel, and for Yevreiskaya Biblioteka, and was a regular contributor to other Hebrew and Russian periodicals (mostly under the pen name "Remez"). He was a friend of Count Leo Tolstoy, whose studies in Hebrew and in the Old Testament he directed. Minor also corresponded with many of the prominent Maskilim of his time.

== Sermons ==
In his younger days Minor delivered his sermons in German. Among the sermons he delivered during his time in the Vilna seminary was Der Rabbiner und der Lehrer (Vilna, 1858). It pictures the ideal rabbi as a devoted guardian of the spiritual interests of his flock and as the advocate of his people.

At Minsk and Moscow he began delivering sermons in Russian—the first rabbi to do so—and frequently had many Christians among his hearers. His sermons served as models for synagogal discourses in Russia, and were published in Moscow in three volumes between 1875 and 1889. They consisted largely of elucidations of the principles of Judaism, explanations of historical events concerning the Jews, and homilies on the duties of the Jews as Russian citizens.

== Publications ==
- Der Rabbiner und der Lehrer, was sie ihrem Volke sein sollen. Vilna: Joseph Zawadzky. 1858.
- Rabbi Ippolit Lutostanski. Moscow. 1879. Directed against Lutostanski's anti-Semitic book The Jews and the Talmud.
- An outline of the history of the Jewish people, after the German of M. Elkan (Moscow, 1880; 2d ed., 1881)
- Poslye Pogromov. Moscow. 1882. On the anti-Jewish riots in Russia.
- Biblia Ob Utotrebleniye Vina. Moscow. 1882. On the teaching of the Bible in regard to alcoholic beverages.
