= Monument to Grand Duke Sergey Alexandrovich =

Monument to Grand Duke Sergei Alexandrovich
- Памятник великому князю Сергею Александровичу
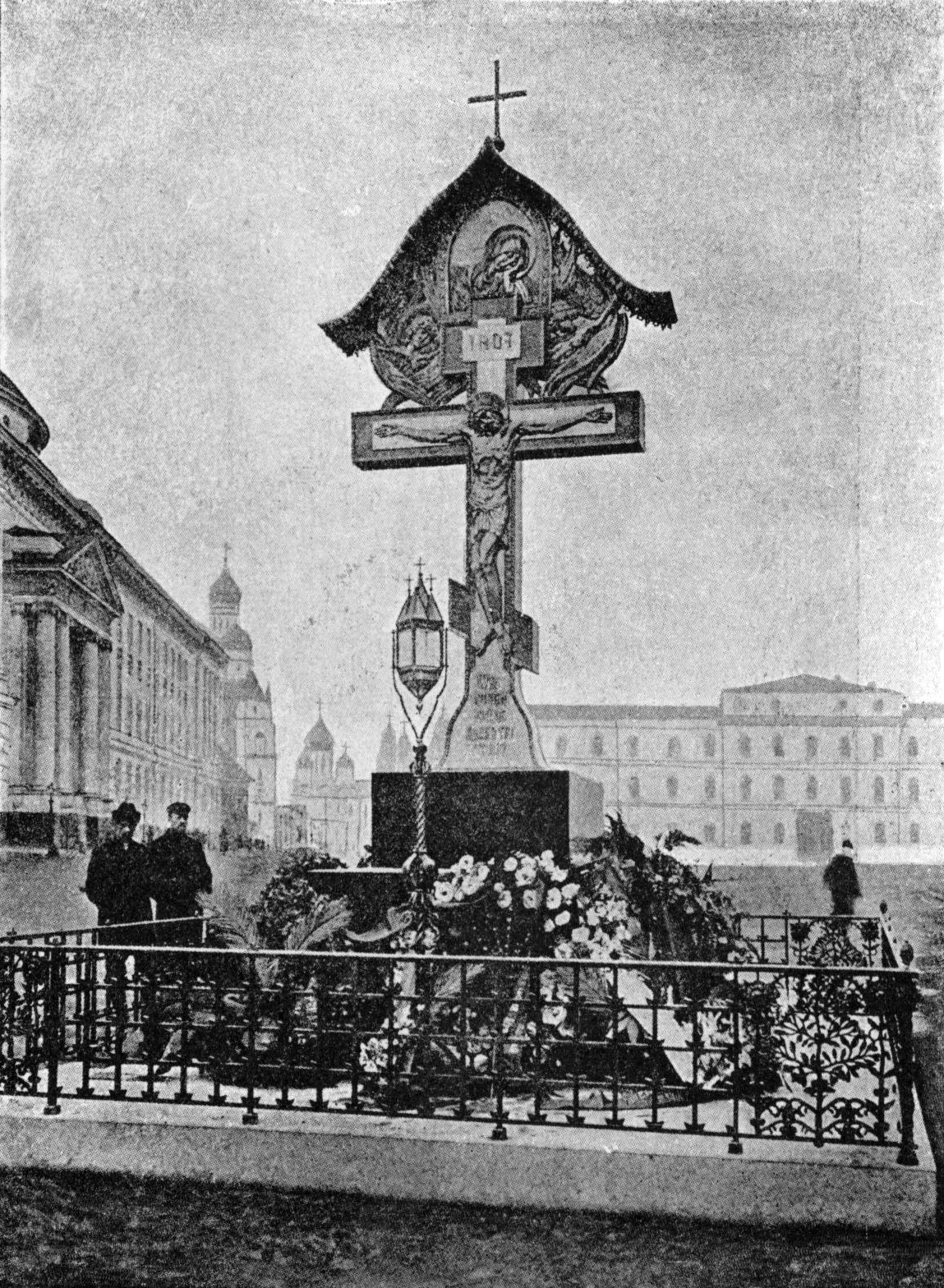
- Original monument
- Interactive map of Monument to Grand Duke Sergei Alexandrovich
- Location: Moscow Kremlin, Russia
- Coordinates: 55°45′14″N 37°37′03″E
- Designer: Viktor Vasnetsov
- Type: Memorial
- Completion date: April 2, 1908 (Original); May 4, 2017 (Restored)
- Dedicated to: Grand Duke Sergei Alexandrovich of Russia

The Monument to Grand Duke Sergei Alexandrovich (Russian: Памятник великому князю Сергею Александровичу) is a monument dedicated to Sergei Alexandrovich, it was consecrated on April 2, 1908, in the exact spot of his assassination. After the Bolshevik Revolution, the monument was destroyed in 1918, but was restored in 1998 in the Novospassky Monastery, where Sergei's remains are buried. The second restored monument was consecrated in the Moscow Kremlin in 2017, where the original monument once stood.

== History ==
In 1905, Grand Duke Sergei Alexandrovich was assassinated right next to the Kremlin Senate and Nikolskaya Tower, when a terrorist threw a nitroglycerin bomb directly into Sergei's lap, killing him instantly. A monument was later built in 1908 on the exact spot of his assassination, and was later destroyed in 1918 by the Bolsheviks. In 2017, Vladimir Putin made a speech at the unveiling of the reconsecrated monument commemorating Sergei Alexandrovich's assassination. Putin then addressed the history behind the monument, and willingness of the Russian people, especially from Russian artist Viktor Vasnetsov, the original designer of the monument.

== Artistic features ==
The original bronze monument, set on a stepped pedestal of dark green Labrador, was an example of 'Church Art Nouveau'. Its prototype was the obituary crosses of the Russian North. On the obverse of the sculpture, there were enamel inserts. Above the crucifix under the wavy-curved roof was the image of the Mother of God in mourning and two cherubs. On the backside were placed images of the Saviour Not Made by hands, Venerable Sergius of Radonezh The unquenchable lamp was placed in front of the monument.

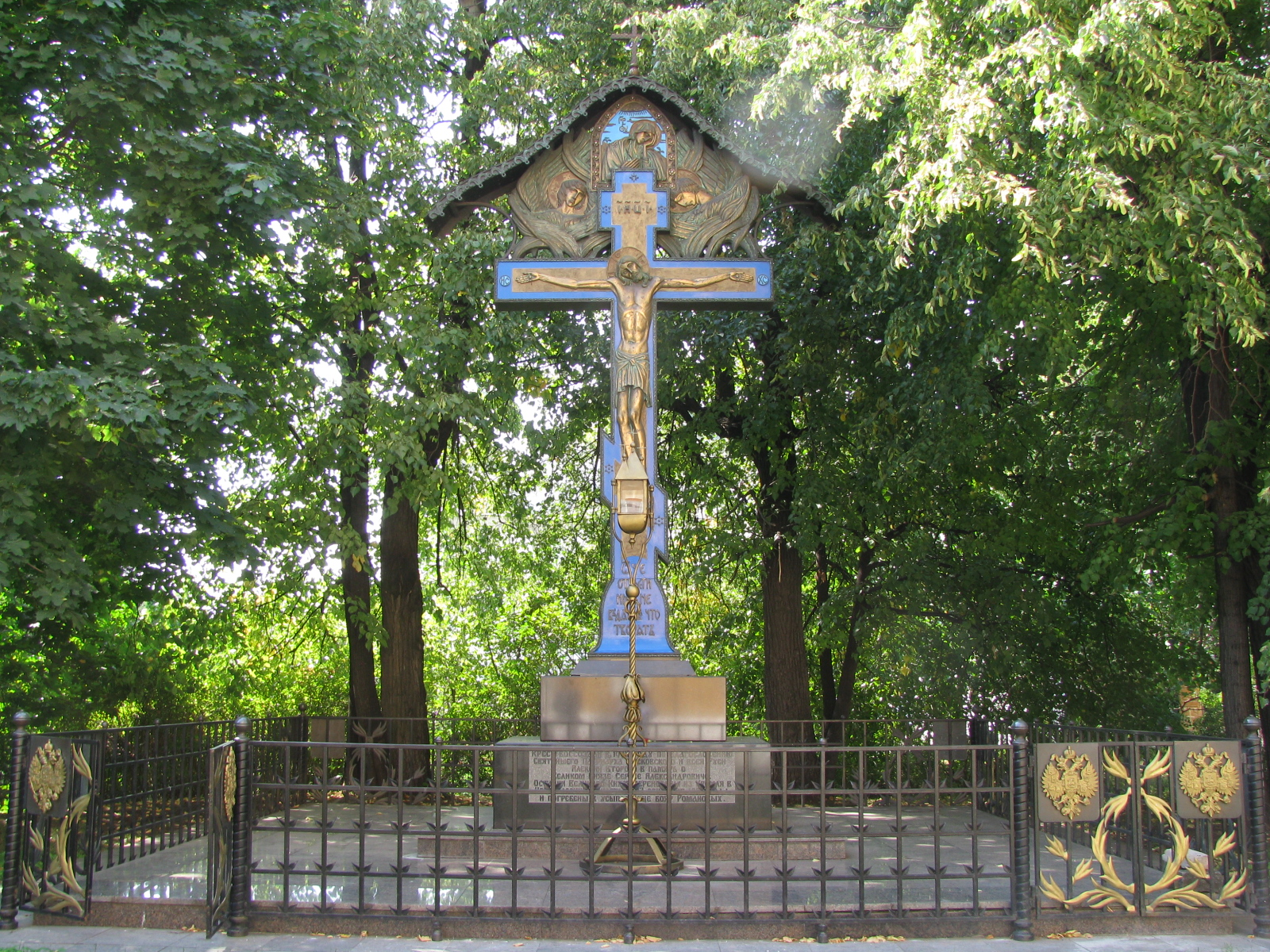
The first reconstructed monument to Grand Duke Sergei Alexandrovich was built in the Novospassky Monastery in 1998

The reconstructed memorials erected in the Novospassky Monastery and on the site of the murder of the Grand Duke in the Kremlin are made according to the surviving sketches of Viktor Vasnetsov and are exact copies of the original.

== Gallery ==
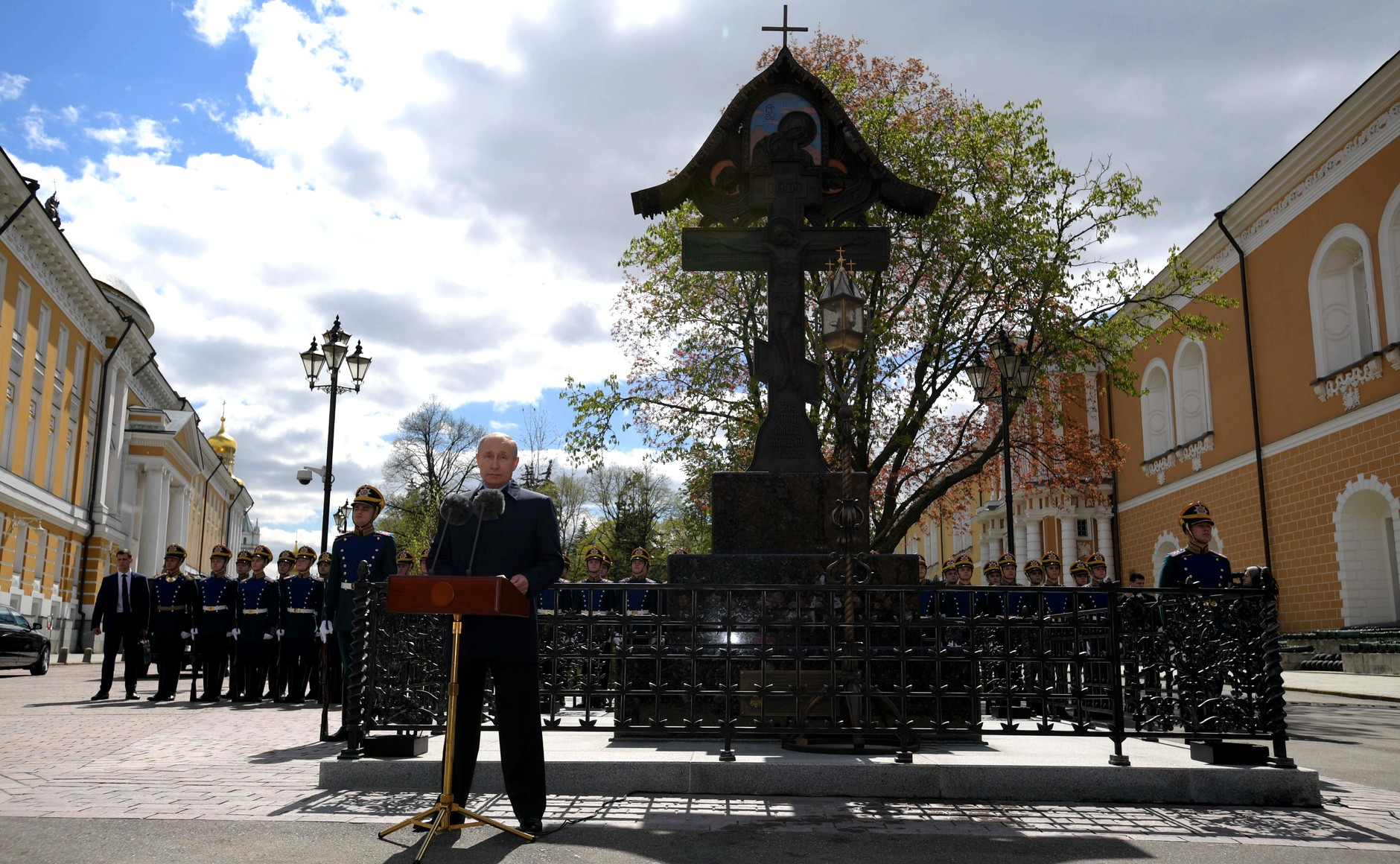
Putin's official speech in front of the news press and Russian orthodox church on the unveiling of the monument

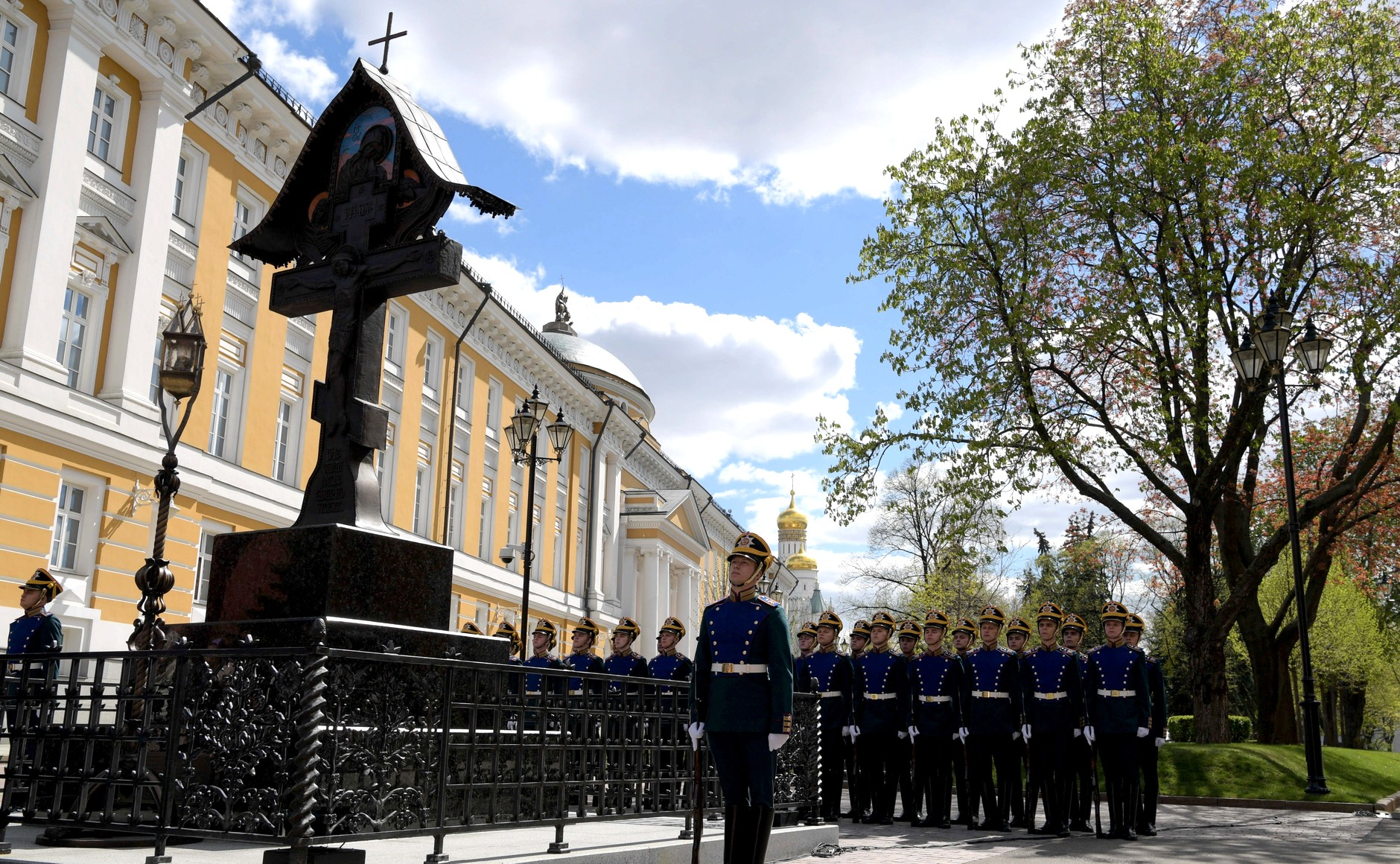
Honor Guards of the Kremlin Regiment in formation behind the monument

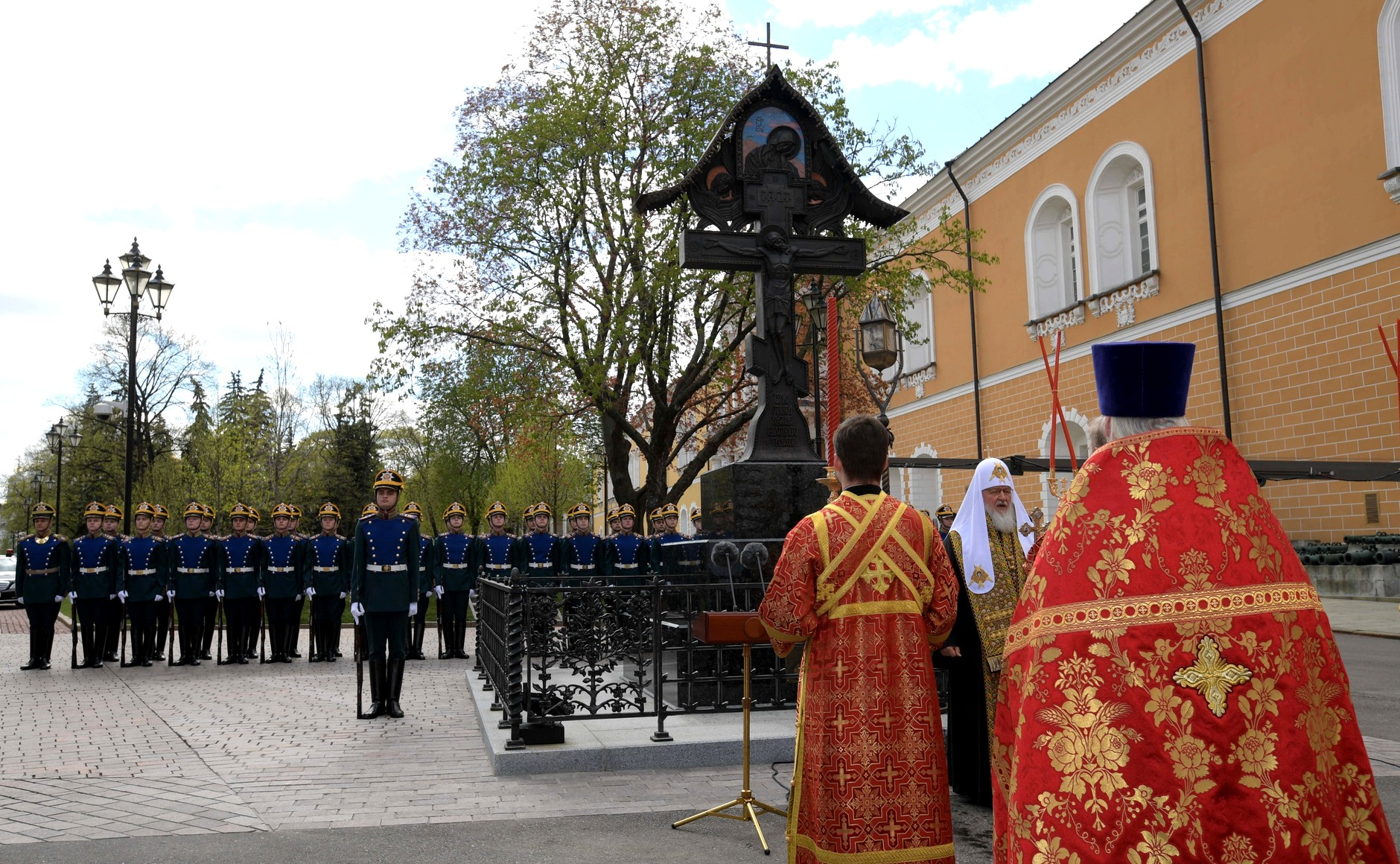
Orthodox priests taking part in the opening ceremony

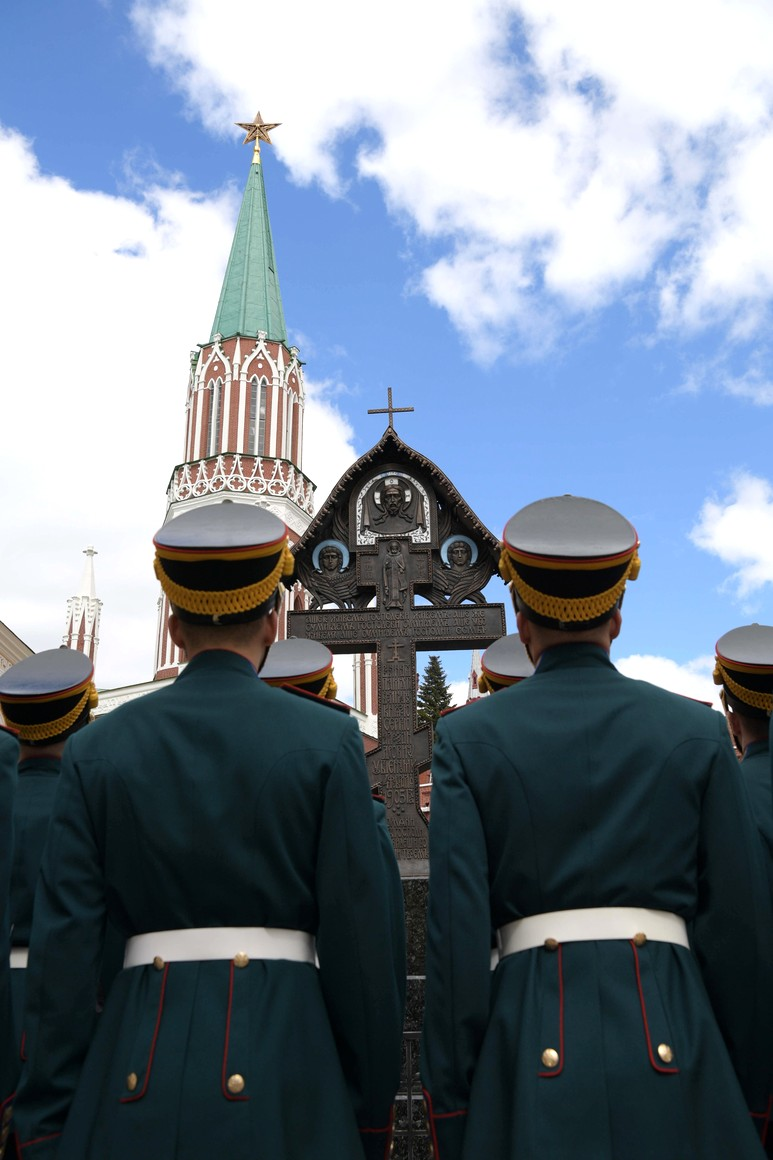
Honor guards in frame of the cross

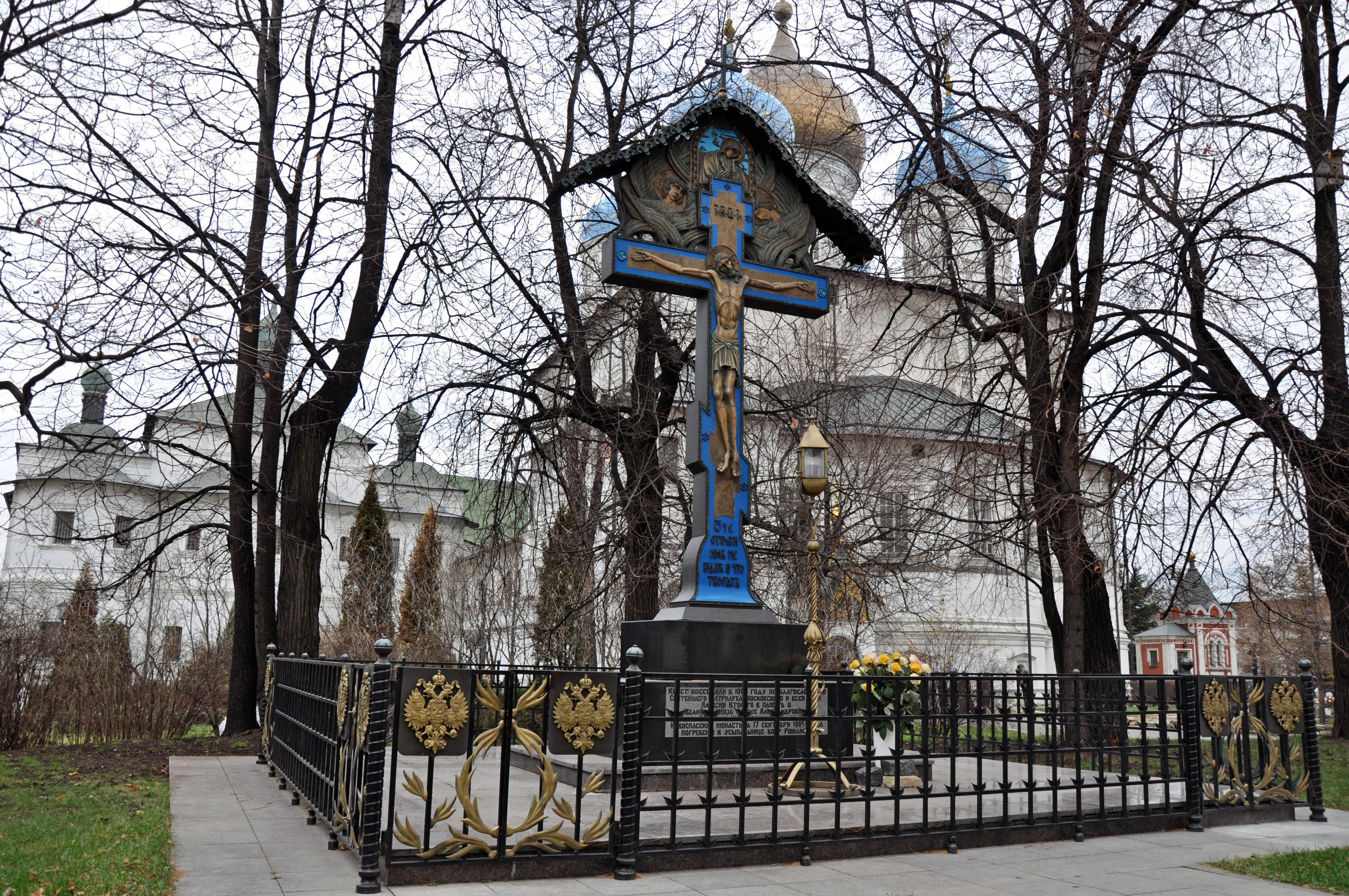
Monument at the Novospassky Monastery
