= Minor (given name) =

Minor is a masculine given name. Notable people with this name include:

- Minor J. Coon (1921–2018), American biochemist
- Minor Hall (1897–1959), American jazz drummer
- Minor Cooper Keith (1848–1929), American businessman
- Minor Watson (1889–1965), American character actor
- Minor White (1908–1976), American photographer

== See also ==
- Minor (surname)
