= Wilma Frances Minor =

American writer and literary forger

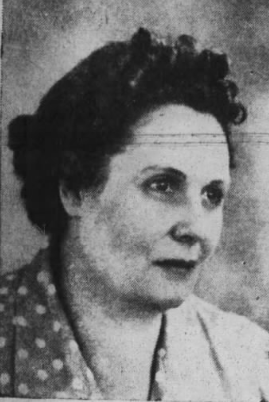
Wilma Frances Minor, 15 Aug 1941, The Chula Vista Star

Wilma Frances Minor Meredith was a novelist, short story writer and biographer. In 1928 she was involved in "one of the most notorious journalistic forgeries of the twentieth century", faking and publishing letters and a diary "proving" the love and relationship between Abraham Lincoln and Ann Rutledge.

== Early life ==
Wilma Frances Minor was a native of California, the daughter of Cora de Boyer.

== Career ==
She was a novelist, short story writer, and biographer as well as a feature writer for the San Diego Union. She was also an associate editor of the Southwest Magazine.

She was an actress, playing for a number of years in drama, vaudeville and musical comedies, principally in the B. C. Whitney productions and for two years she was leading the Selig Polyscope Company under the direction of Otis Turner, during which time she featured in a number of productions requiring expert riding and swimming in which she was expert. She was the scenarist for Selig, American Standard Film Company, and Mirror Films; her scenarios included: "The Song of Courage", "The Desert Rat", "Mothers of Men", "The Wraith", "Of the Blue Lagoon", "In Wrong Sims", "Meeting Mother", "Atonea of Old Castle", and the "Foxicus" series.

She was a protege of Marie Corelli; she contributed to the Children's Page of the San Francisco Call at the age of ten.

She was very much interested in the restoration of old missions and landmarks. She was also interested in allied arts and athletics.

She authored: "The Splendid Release", "Love Affairs of the Virgin Queen", "Life of Tzu Hsi— Empress of China," "Life of Madame Schumann-Heink", and "Love of Abe Lincoln and Ann Rutledge, with Original Letters". In 1928 she was involved in "one of the most notorious journalistic forgeries of the twentieth century," faking and publishing in the Atlantic Monthly letters and diary proving the love and relationship between Abraham Lincoln and Ann Rutledge.

After the scandal Wilma Frances Minor used the pen-name of Wilma Minor Meredith, her husband being Ernest Meredith of Chula Vista, California. In 1941 she started a collaboration with The Chula Vista Star where she interviewed business, professional and outstanding citizens of Chula Vista.

== Personal life ==
Wilma Frances Minor lived in New York City and Chicago, and moved to San Diego in 1923 and lived at Casa Caldiego, 4020 Forty-seventh St., San Diego, California. She married Ernest L. Meredith (died 1956), a chef at Fredericka Home, Chula Vista, for eleven years, and then owner of the Bonita Cafe. They first lived in Chula Vista and after 20 years moved to Atascadero, California.
