= Sheila Minor =

American environmental technician (born 1946/7)

- Born: Sheila Diane Minor
- Education: George Mason University
- Occupations: Scientist; biologist; technician
- Scientific career
- Fields: Biology, environmental science
- Workplaces: United States Fish and Wildlife Service; Smithsonian Institution; United States Department of the Interior

Sheila D. Minor (born 1946 or 1947 (age 79–80)), formerly Sheila Jones (now Sheila Minor Huff), is a former Biological Research Technician whose 35-year career included positions at the Environmental Protection Agency, the Department of the Interior, and the Smithsonian Institution.

== Life and career ==
Minor earned her bachelor's degree in biological sciences and worked for Clyde Jones at the United States Fish and Wildlife Service. When Minor applied for her first job, at the Bureau of Sport Fisheries and Wildlife, the company insisted she had to be a secretary. Knowing the worth of her knowledge, Minor didn't take that position.

She spent two years researching the mammals of Poplar Island, and presented this work at the American Society of Mammalogists meeting in 1975. She earned a master's degree in environmental science at George Mason University and worked with K-12 schools on science education.

She ran a Department of Interior office in Chicago.

Minor served on the Smithsonian Women's Council. She had a 35-year-long career at various federal bureaus including the Environmental Protection Agency, where she was responsible for assessing environmental impact statements for many projects, ranging from hydroelectric dams to noise abatement procedures. At retirement in 2006, Minor was a senior employee in the Department of the Interior.

As of 2018, Huff lives in Virginia, where she is an active member of her church and belly dances for a hobby.

== International Conference on the Biology of Whales ==
Minor's story became a matter of public interest in 2018, when a photograph of conference attendees appeared on Twitter. Sheila Minor was the only woman in the conference's group photo, and the only person labelled as 'not identified'. Candace Jean Anderson, an artist and writer from Salt Lake City, Utah, came across the photograph whilst researching a picture book on the Marine Mammal Protection Act. She took to Twitter to find out who the unidentified woman was, and the tweet went viral. Eventually over 11,000 people answered her initial call for help, including the Smithsonian Institution's Deborah Shapiro. Anderson reached out to Minor on Facebook and the two spoke for a few hours.

The photograph was taken at the 1971 International Conference on the Biology of Whales. The conference was attended by almost 40 international scientists and conservationists, and co-organised by Matilene Berryman and Suzanne Montgomery Contos, who were also uncovered in the Twitter conversation. The photograph was taken by G. Carleton Ray, who remembered Minor by name but had assumed she was an assistant administrator. The story of the "mystery whale scientist" was covered extensively in the media. Minor's story has drawn comparisons between her and the women in Margot Lee Shetterly's Hidden Figures.

== Personal life ==
Minor lives in Virginia and has five grandchildren.
