= Jacqueline Minor =

British European Commission official

Jacqueline Minor was appointed the European Commission's Head of Representation in the United Kingdom in 2013. Minor was described by the Huffington Post in 2013 as ‘the woman with the hardest job in Britain’ because, one month after her appointment, British Prime Minister David Cameron announced that he would seek to renegotiate Britain's membership of the European Union and would hold a referendum on EU membership in 2017.

Jacqueline Minor was brought up in Northampton in England. Minor graduated from Birmingham University with an LLB degree in law in 1977. She was a lecturer in law at Leicester University before working for the European Court of Justice in Luxembourg and the European Commission in Brussels. In 2003 she was appointed a Director in the European Commission. Minor became the European Commission's Director for Consumer Policy in 2008. Minor took office as the European Commission's Head of Representation in the United Kingdom in February 2013. As Head of Representation, Minor is the European Commission's spokesperson in the UK. The head office of the UK Representation is based in London, co-ordinates the European Commission's activities in the UK and takes specific responsibility for England.
