= Raleigh Colston Minor =

American legal scholar (1869–1923)

- Born: Raleigh Colston Minor; 24 January 1869; United States
- Died: 14 June 1923 (aged 54); Virginia, United States
- Education: University of Virginia
- Occupation: legal scholar
- Scientific career
- Fields: Property law

Raleigh Colston Minor (24 January 1869 – 14 June 1923) was an American legal scholar who specialized in property laws and taxation.

== Life ==
He was born on 24 January 1869.

His parents were John B. Minor and Anne Fisher Colston.

He died on 14 June 1923 in Virginia, United States.

== Education ==
He received three degrees from the University of Virginia — B.A. in 1887, M.S. in 1888, and LL.B. in 1890.

== Career ==
He practiced law in Richmond, Virginia for three years before joining the University of Virginia faculty.

He served as a Member of Law Faculty at the University of Virginia from 1893 to 1923.

== Bibliography ==
He is the author of a number of books:

- Notes on the Science of Government and the Relations of the States to the United States
- The Law of Real Property (Based on Minor's Institutes)
- A Republic of Nations: A Study of the Organization of a Federal League of Nations New York, Oxford university press, American branch 1918
- Conflict of Laws; or, Private International Law
- The Law of Tax Titles in Virginia

== See also ==
- University of Virginia
