= Wladek Minor =

Polish-American structural biologist (born 1946)

Władysław Minor
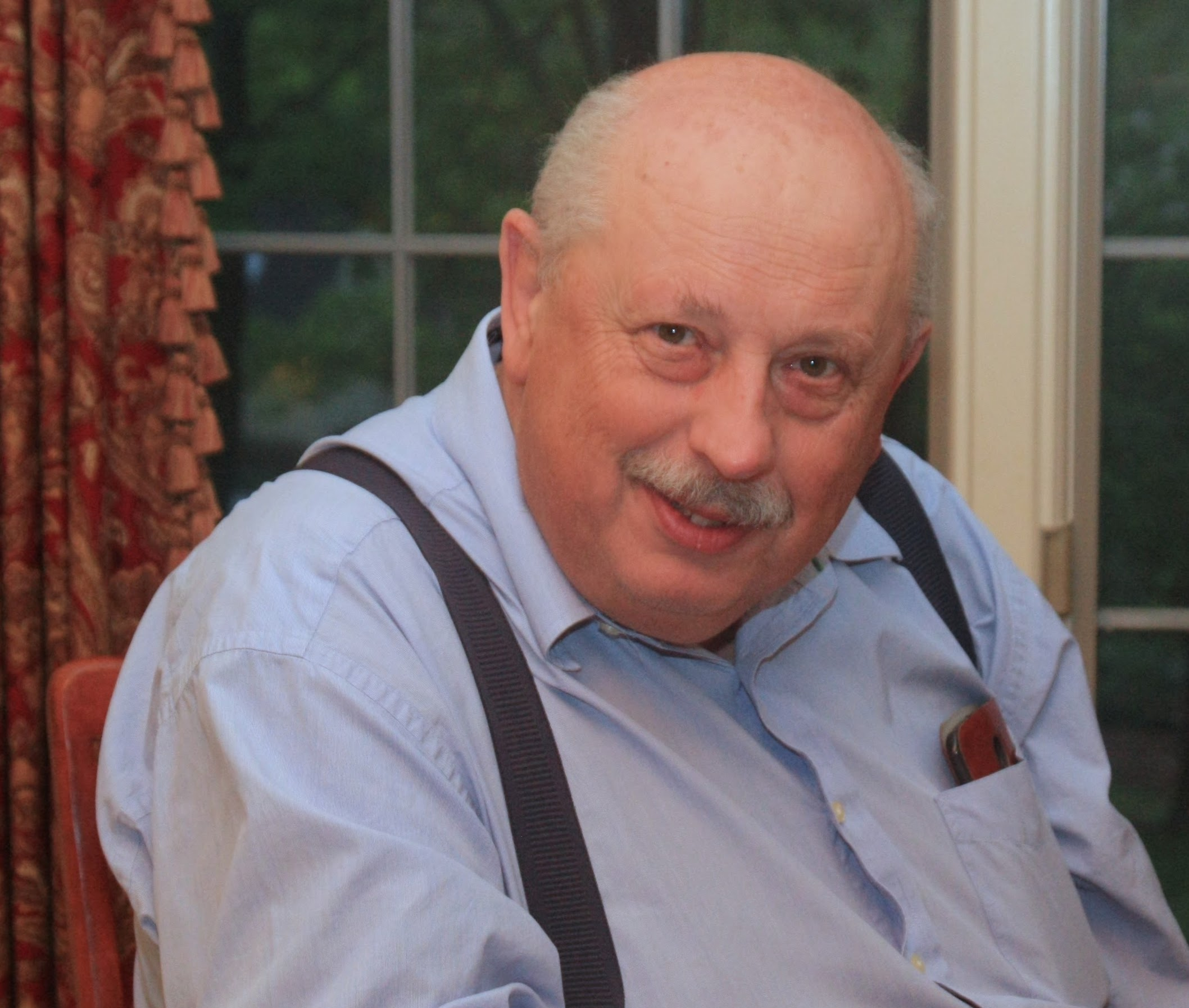
- Wladek Minor in 2016
- Born: May 1946 (age 80)
- Education: University of Warsaw (MA) University of Warsaw (PhD)
- Occupation: biophysicist
- Known for: research on structural biology and protein crystallography
- Awards: Fellow of the American Association for the Advancement of Science (2018); Fellow of the American Crystallographic Association (2018); Recipient of the PIASA Tadeusz Sendzimir Applied Science Award (2020)
- Website: minorlab.org

Władysław Minor also known as Wladek Minor (born 1946) is a Polish-American biophysicist, a specialist in structural biology and protein crystallography. He is a Harrison Distinguished Professor of Molecular Physiology and Biological Physics at the University of Virginia. Minor is a co-author of HKL2000/HKL3000 – crystallographic data processing and structure solution software used to process data and solve structures of macromolecules, as well as small molecules. He is a co-founder of HKL Research, a company that distributes the software. He is also a co-author of a public repository of diffraction images (proteindiffraction.org) for some of the protein structures available in the Protein Data Bank and other software tools for structural biology.

== Early life and education ==
Władysław Minor was born in Poland in May 1946. He obtained his M.Sc. degree in 1969 (supervisor - Bronisław Buras) and his Ph.D. degree in 1977 (supervisor - Izabela Sosnowska) from the Physics Department at the University of Warsaw. He moved to the United States in 1985 at the age of 39.

== Career and research ==
Minor's main focus of interest during the Ph.D. studies was solid-state physics. For several years after receiving his Ph.D. from the University of Warsaw, he continued to work in this area of research.

After moving to the United States in 1985 and working with Michael Rossmann at Purdue University, he gradually switched into the field of macromolecular crystallography. While at Purdue, Minor started a collaboration with Zbyszek Otwinowski, with whom they developed software for processing X-ray diffraction data (Denzo, Scalepack, XDisplayF). Their paper “Processing of X-ray diffraction data collected in oscillation mode” published in 1997 was listed as number 23 in the list of 100 most-cited research papers of all times. As of 2021, this paper has been cited over 41000 times (according to Google Scholar).

In 1995, Minor joined the University of Virginia as a faculty member. Around the same time, he and Zbyszek Otwinowski founded HKL Research.

Starting from 2000, his lab was a part of two Protein Structure Initiative centers: the Midwest Center for Structural Genomic (MSCG) and the New York Structural Genomics Research Consortium (NYSGRC). The lab was also a part of the Center for Structural Genomics of Infectious Diseases (CSGID) and the Enzyme Function Initiative. The Minor lab developed and maintained data management and structure solution tools, as well as performed quality control of the crystal structures and conducted determination of some of the structures.

The Minor lab has developed many other software tools for structural biology, including proteindiffraction.org (a public repository of diffraction images), CMM (a server for validation of metal-binding sites in macromolecular structures), CheckMyBlob (a machine learning system that automatically detects and validates ligands in X-ray electron density map), and LabDB (a laboratory information management system for structural biology).

During the COVID-19 pandemic, Wladek Minor became involved in the improvement of SARS-Cov-2 macromolecular crystal structures and published several scientific publications on the subject, as well as a publication on molecular determinants of vascular transport of dexamethasone in COVID-19 therapy. His research on COVID-19 has been reported by multiple media outlets.

Minor's lab has produced over 240 scientific publications and over 450 crystal structures of proteins. As of 2021, his papers were cited over 55000 times (according to Google Scholar).

== Awards and honors ==
- The Tadeusz Sendzimir Applied Sciences Award – 2020 2020
- Fellow of the American Association for the Advancement of Science – 2018
- Fellow of the American Crystallographic Association – 2018
- American Friends of UW joint award - University of Warsaw - 2018
- Inventor of the Year Award - University of Virginia - 2007

== Personal life ==
Wladek Minor is married to Iwona Minor. They have two sons.
