= Wayne Miner =

American soldier (died 1918)

Wayman "Wayne" Miner
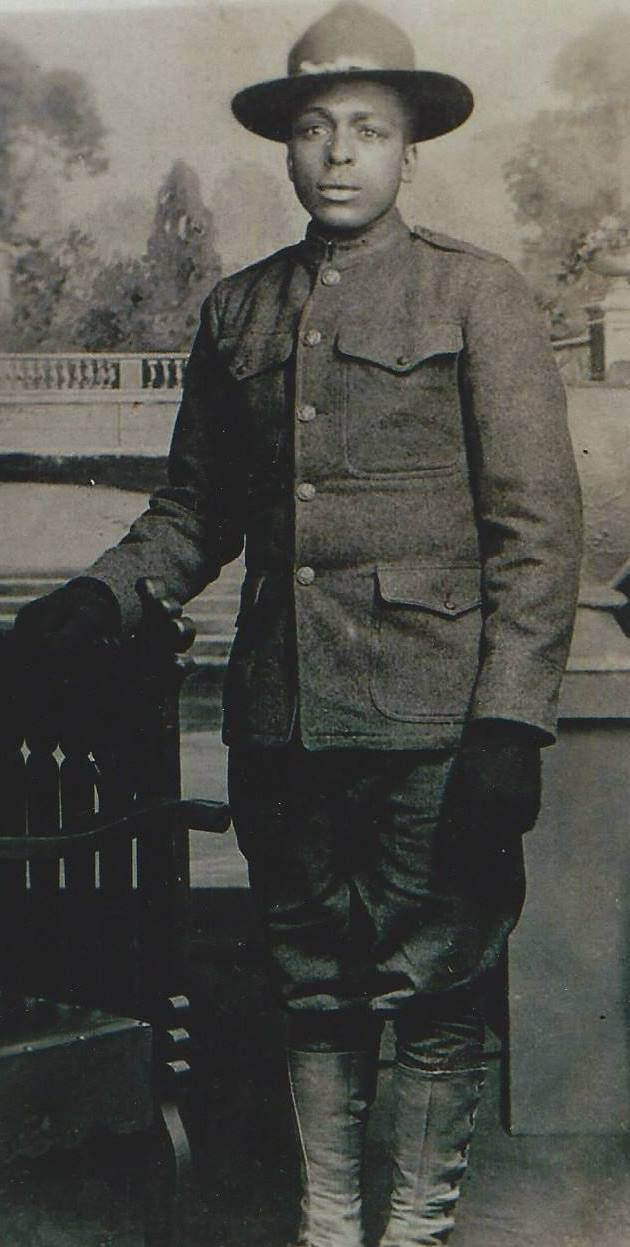
- Born: Wayman Minor; Henry County, Missouri, U.S.
- Died: November 11, 1918; France
- Cause of death: Shrapnel
- Burial place: St. Mihiel American Cemetery and Memorial
- Military career
- Allegiance: United States
- Branch: Army
- Service years: 1917–1918
- Unit: 366th Infantry Regiment
- Conflicts: Meuse-Argonne Offensive

Wayman Miner (died November 11, 1918) was an American soldier who fought in the Buffalo Soldier regiment during the First World War. He died in the hours between the signing of the Armistice and the symbolic 11 a.m. time it was set to go into effect, after volunteering for a mission to carry ammunition to a machine gun nest.

== Early life ==
Wayman "Wayne" Miner was born in the early 1890s in Henry County, Missouri, to Ned and Emily Minor, both former slaves. The family later moved to Appanoose County, Iowa, where Miner worked as a coal miner before enlisting in the army. Miner married Belle Carter sometime between 1910 and 1918.

== Service ==
Miner enlisted in the U.S. Army in October 1917 in Kansas City, Missouri. He completed his basic training at Camp Dodge, Iowa. On June 15, 1918, he was deployed to France with Company A, 366th Infantry Regiment, 92nd Division. This was a segregated African American combat unit, known as the "Buffalo Soldiers", whose shoulder patch insignia featured a charging buffalo and whose motto was "Deeds, Not Words." The 92nd Division was one of two segregated African American combat divisions in the American Expeditionary Forces.

== Death ==
During the Meuse-Argonne Offensive on November 11, 1918, Miner volunteered alongside three other soldiers to supply ammunition to a machine gun nest which was under fire. Miner died carrying out that mission, reportedly from shrapnel. His death came after the Armistice was signed but before it went into effect, as the cession of fighting was delayed six hours to coincide with "the eleventh hour of the eleventh day of the eleventh month."

Miner was buried in the St. Mihiel American Cemetery in Thiaucourt, France.

== Dedications and media ==
The Wayne Miner American Legion Post 149—dedicated to Miner—is the second-oldest African-American legion in the nation, with over one-hundred members. Miner also gave his name to the Wayne Miner Community Center and the Wayne Minor Court housing project, which was demolished in 1987.
