= Osip Minor =

Russian revolutionary (1861–1932)

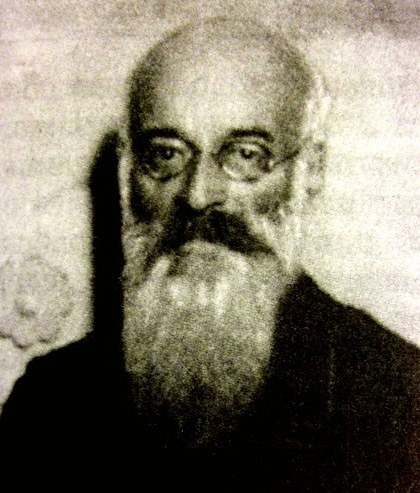
Osip Minor.

Osip Solomonovich Minor (Belarusian: Осіп Саламонавіч Мінор; Russian: Осип Соломонович Минор; 8 December 1861 – 24 September 1932) was a Russian revolutionary and member of the Socialist-Revolutionary Party.

Minor was born in Minsk (now in Belarus, then part of Minsk Governorate, Russian Empire). His father was Rabbi Solomon Minor, and many of his ancestors had been rabbis as well.

== Revolutionary politics ==
Minor became involved in revolutionary politics while studying at the University of Moscow. He joined the party of 'People's Will' in the early 1880s. In 1883 he was arrested for the first time, and again in 1885. In 1887 he received a sentence of ten years hard labour in Siberia. On 22 March 1889 he participated in a prisoners' uprising in Yakutsk and was condemned to death by hanging, but the sentence was commuted to hard labour for life.

In 1896 he was released but forbidden to live in European Russia. That restriction was eased in 1898; he was merely forbidden to live in St. Petersburg or Moscow.

== Vilna revolutionary movement ==
Around 1900 he settled in Vilna (now Vilnius in Lithuania). He became active in the revolutionary movement in Vilna, but gravitated toward Narodnik circles rather than to the Marxist Bund because they seemed to him to be more revolutionary. He was affiliated with the mainly Jewish Socialist-Revolutionary Workers' Party for the Political Liberation of Russia, organised by Mark Natanson.

== PSR ==
In 1901, Minor travelled abroad and assisted in the unification of various Socialist-Revolutionary groups in the Socialist-Revolutionary Party (PSR). He returned to Russia and worked for the PSR in various capacities and participated in the Revolution of 1905. In 1909, Evno Azev, head of the PSR's 'Combat Organisation' and an agent of the Okhrana (secret police), betrayed Minor and had him arrested again, but by 1913 Minor had escaped from Siberia and was in Geneva, Switzerland, working with the organisation of Russian Socialist-Revolutionaries Abroad. He seems to have returned to Russia but was captured. He was freed by the February Revolution of 1917.

== World War I ==
During the First World War Minor took a Defencist position, which put him at odds with the PSR leader Viktor Chernov and with his old associate Natanson.

In 1917 Minor became president of the Moscow City Duma. He opposed the Bolshevik October Revolution and supported attempts to set up an anti-Bolshevik democratic government.

== Later years ==
Minor left Russia in 1919. He settled in Paris, remained active in the community of Russian exiles and edited the journal Volia Rossii (Russian Will), together with V. M. Zenzinov and V. I. Lebedev.

In 1921 he was one of the authors of an exposé of the Kronstadt rebellion and its suppression by the Bolsheviks, The Truth about Kronstadt. Minor also served as chairman of the Society for Assistance to Exiles and Political Prisoners in Russia. Among his close friends was Ilya Fondaminsky ('Bunakov'), a veteran SR who later converted from Judaism to Orthodox Christianity and was murdered in the Auschwitz concentration camp in 1942. He wrote his memoirs, Eto Bylo Davno (It was Long Ago), covering the pre-war period; they were published posthumously in 1933.
