= Grand Duke Sergei Alexandrovich of Russia =

Russian noble (1857–1905)

Grand Duke Sergei Alexandrovich
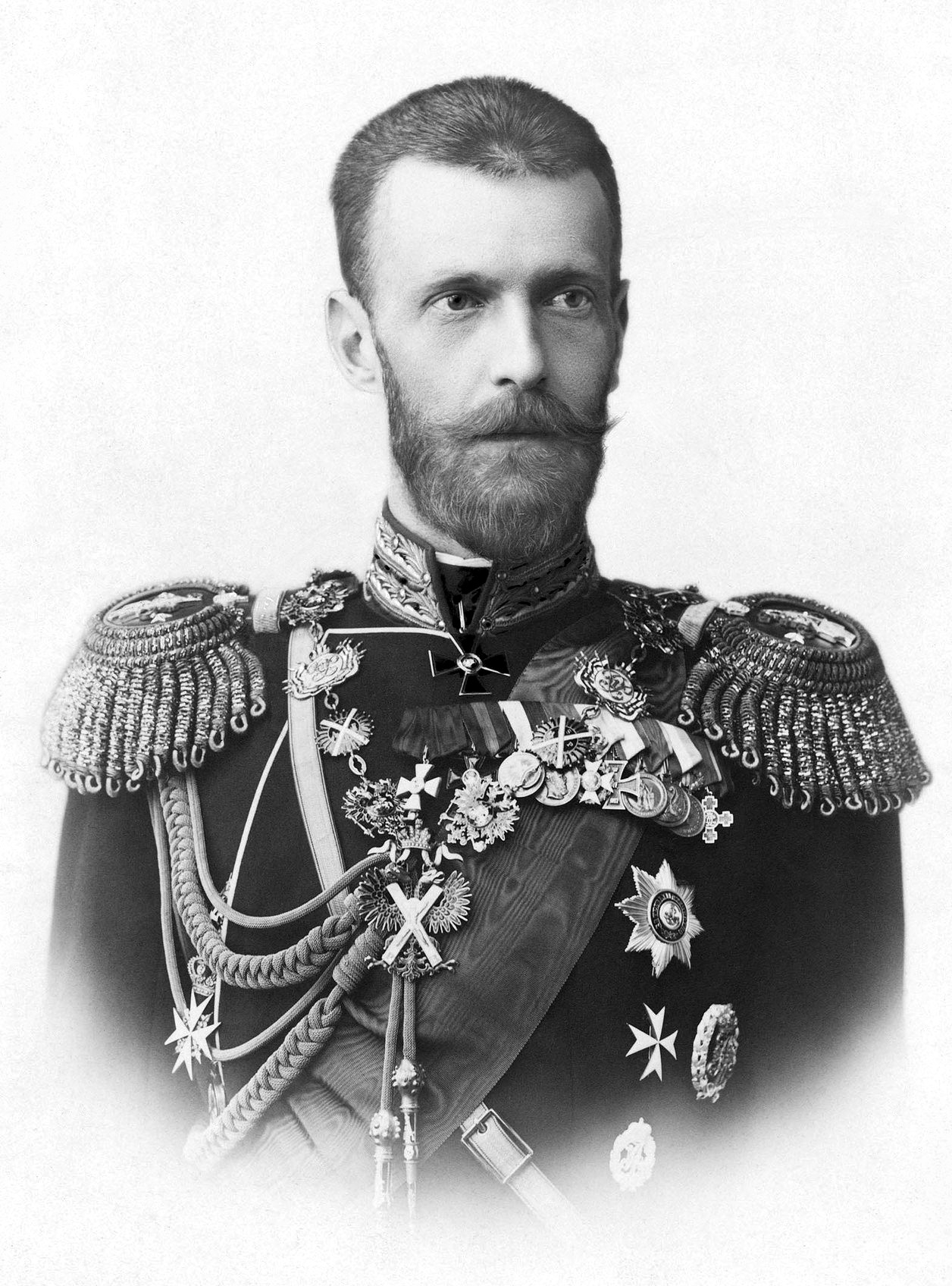
- Photograph by Sergey Levitsky, c. 1894

48th Governor-General of Moscow
- In office 1891 – 17 February 1905
- Monarchs: Alexander III; Nicholas II
- Preceded by: Vladimir Dolgorukov
- Succeeded by: Alexander Kozlov
- Born: 11 May 1857; Catherine Palace, Tsarskoye Selo, St. Petersburg, Russian Empire
- Died: 17 February 1905 (aged 47); Moscow Kremlin, Moscow, Moscow Governorate, Russian Empire
- Burial: Chudov Monastery (original burial place); Novospassky Monastery, Moscow (since 1995)
- Spouse: Princess Elisabeth of Hesse and by Rhine (m. 1884)
Names
- Sergei Alexandrovich Romanov
- House: Holstein-Gottorp-Romanov
- Father: Alexander II of Russia
- Mother: Marie of Hesse and by Rhine
- Religion: Russian Orthodox

Grand Duke Sergei Alexandrovich of Russia (Russian: Сергей Александрович; 11 May 1857 – 17 February 1905) was the fifth son and seventh child of Emperor Alexander II of Russia. He was an influential figure during the reigns of his brother Emperor Alexander III of Russia and his nephew Emperor Nicholas II, who was also his brother-in-law through Sergei's marriage to Elisabeth, the sister of Empress Alexandra.

Grand Duke Sergei's education gave him lifelong interests in culture and the arts. Like all male members of the Romanov dynasty, he followed a military career, and fought in the Russo-Turkish War of 1877–78, receiving the Order of St George for courage and bravery in action. In 1882, his brother, Tsar Alexander III, appointed him commander of the 1st Battalion Preobrazhensky Life Guard Regiment, a position he held until 1891. In 1889, Grand Duke Sergei was promoted to the rank of major general. In 1884, Sergei married Princess Elisabeth of Hesse and by Rhine, a granddaughter of Queen Victoria. Their marriage remained childless, but they became the guardians of the two children of his brother, Grand Duke Paul Alexandrovich of Russia: Grand Duchess Maria, and Grand Duke Dmitri. Grand Duke Sergei Alexandrovich and his wife promoted the marriage of Sergei's nephew, Tsar Nicholas II, with Princess Alix of Hesse, Elisabeth's youngest surviving sister.

Between 1891 and 1905, Grand Duke Sergei served as Governor-General of Moscow. His reputation was initially tarnished as he was partially blamed for the Khodynka Tragedy during the festivities following the coronation of Emperor Nicholas II. As Governor of Moscow, he pursued very conservative policies that made him a polarizing figure. At the start of his tenure, he expelled Moscow's 20,000 Jews and repressed a student movement to prevent the spread of revolutionary ideas. Because of this, he was often regarded as a reactionary. In 1894, Grand Duke Sergei was made a member of the State Council. In 1896, he was promoted to lieutenant general and appointed as commander of Moscow Military District. After thirteen years of service, Grand Duke Sergei resigned from the Governorship on 1 January 1905, though he remained head of the Moscow Military District. Targeted by the SR Combat Organization, he was assassinated later that year by a terrorist bomb at the Kremlin during the 1905 Russian Revolution.

== Early life ==
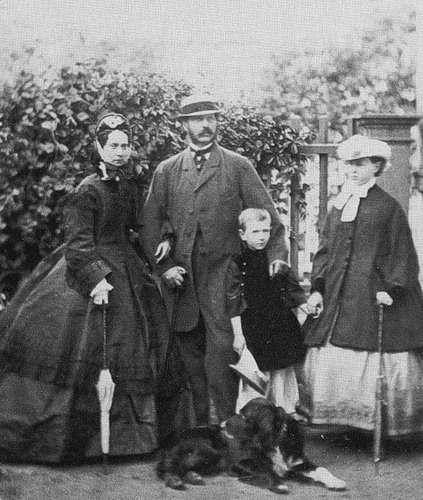
Grand Duke Sergei with his parents and his sister, Grand Duchess Maria Alexandrovna

Grand Duke Sergei Alexandrovich was born on 11 May [O.S. 29 April] 1857 in the Zubov wing of the Catherine Palace at Tsarskoye Selo. He was the seventh child and fifth son among the eight children of Alexander II of Russia and his first wife Maria Alexandrovna, née Princess Marie of Hesse and by Rhine.

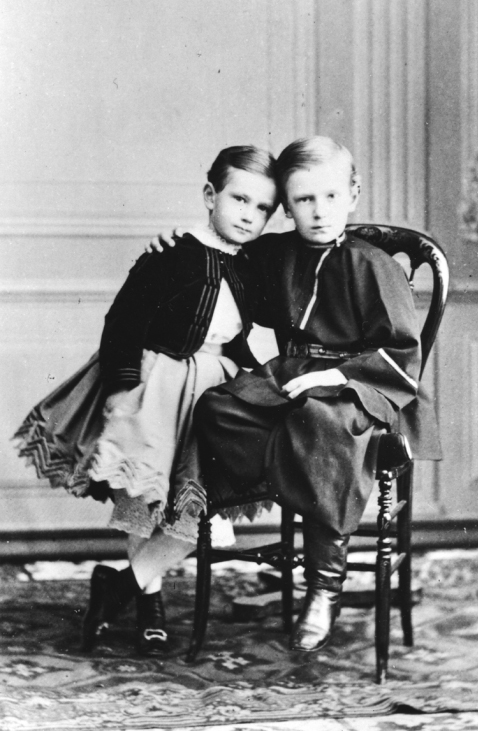
Grand Duke Sergei with his younger brother Grand Duke Paul

Until he was old enough to begin lessons, Sergei's earlier years were spent with his younger brother Paul, from whom he was inseparable, and their sister at Livadia, the family's Crimean retreat, at Tsarskoye Selo, and at the Winter Palace in Saint Petersburg. By the time Sergei was born, his mother was already in declining health. Although she was not a particularly affectionate mother, except to her daughter, her three youngest children, Marie, Sergei and Paul, were close to her and especially to one another. Marie adored him and called him "an exceptionally nice young man... and can be recommended one very possible way, not because he is my brother, but because he is an exception among princes." As time passed and the Empress's health made it necessary for her to avoid the harsh Russian climate, they spent long sojourns abroad in Jugenheim outside Darmstadt and winters in the South of France. A family tragedy hit them there. In April 1865, shortly before Sergei's eighth birthday, his eldest brother and godfather Nicholas, the heir to the crown, died in Nice. As a child, Sergei was shy, studious, and withdrawn. Under the influence of his mother, whose reserved character he resembled, he became very religious.

From the 1870s, Sergei and his younger brother Paul were kept in Russia by their studies. They were destined to follow a military career, but their tutor, Admiral Arseniev, encouraged Sergei's linguistic, artistic, and musical abilities. He was fluent in several languages and learned Italian in order to read Dante in the original. His interest in Italian art and culture intensified as he grew older. He painted well and was musical, playing the flute in an amateur orchestra. He enjoyed acting and steeped himself in the early history, culture, and traditions of Russia. He liked to read and in time came to know many of Russia's great writers personally, among them Tolstoy and Dostoevsky, whose work the Grand Duke read and admired. He met Dostoevsky over dinner at the Winter Palace where he was invited by Sergei's professor.

== Military career ==
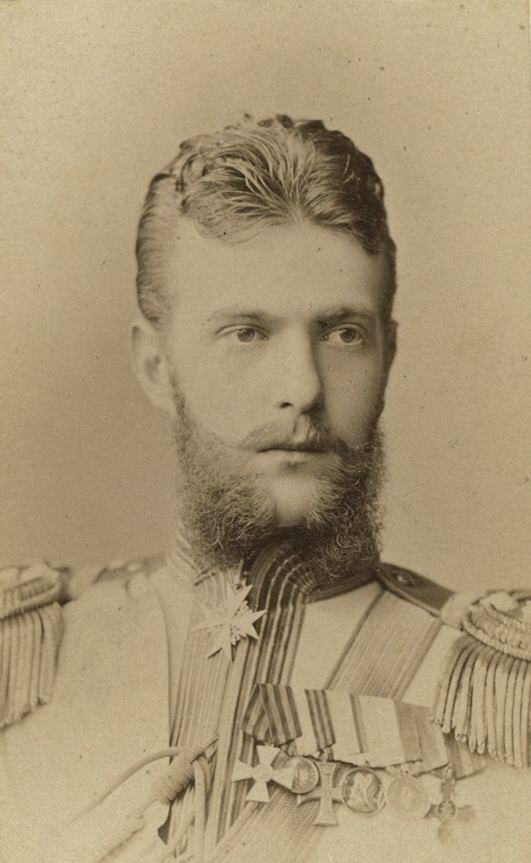
Grand Duke Sergei Alexandrovich in his youth

Grand Duke Sergei Alexandrovich started a military career early in his life. He was from birth colonel-in-chief of the 38th Tobolsk Infantry Regiment; he also became colonel-in-chief of the 2nd Battalion Guards Rifles and, towards the end of his life, Colonel-in-Chief of the 5th Kievsky Grenadier Regiment. On his twentieth birthday on 29 April 1877, the Grand Duke took the solemn oath of allegiance to the Emperor. An educational tour that had been proposed for him was postponed upon the outbreak of the Russo-Turkish War of 1877–78. Sergei took part in the war with his father and brothers, the Tsarevich Alexander and Grand Dukes Vladimir and Alexei. He spent the greater part of his time serving as Poruchik in the Leib Guard under the Tsarevich in southeast Romania. He was consequently promoted to colonel. On 12 October, following the battle of Meyk, the Emperor decorated him with the Order of St George, for courage and bravery in action with the enemy, for a reconnaissance expedition at Kara Loma near Koshev. At the end of December 1877, Sergei Alexandrovich returned to Saint Petersburg with his father.

Alexander II had started a new family with his mistress and Sergei sided with his neglected mother in the breaking of the family's harmony. Empress Maria died in June 1880, and in March 1881 Alexander II, who had married his mistress, Princess Catherine Dolgoruki, was assassinated by terrorists. Sergei was then in Italy with his brother Paul and Admiral Arseniev. Three months later, in June 1881, the Grand Duke went to Palestine accompanied by Paul and his cousin Grand Duke Constantine Constantinovich. They visited Jerusalem and the sacred sites. He helped to found the Imperial Orthodox Palestine Society dedicated to the upkeep of Orthodox shrines in the Holy Land and the provision of services to Russian pilgrims. He became its chairman, and his status as patron of the Russian presence in Jerusalem is believed to have given him more pleasure than any of his other duties.

From 1882 on, Sergei's military career, which occupied an increasing amount of his time in Saint Petersburg and on maneuvers at Krasnoe Selo, advanced still further. On 15 January 1882, his brother, Alexander III, appointed him commander of the 1st Battalion Preobrazhensky Life Guard Regiment, the elite regiment founded by Peter the Great, with the rank of colonel. Seven years later, he was promoted to the rank of major general. On 26 February 1891, he was made adjutant general of the H. I. M. Retinue. He became the commanding officer in the village of Preobrazhenskoy. Sergei commanded this regiment until 1891, when his brother the Emperor appointed him Governor-General of Moscow.

== A Russian Grand Duke ==
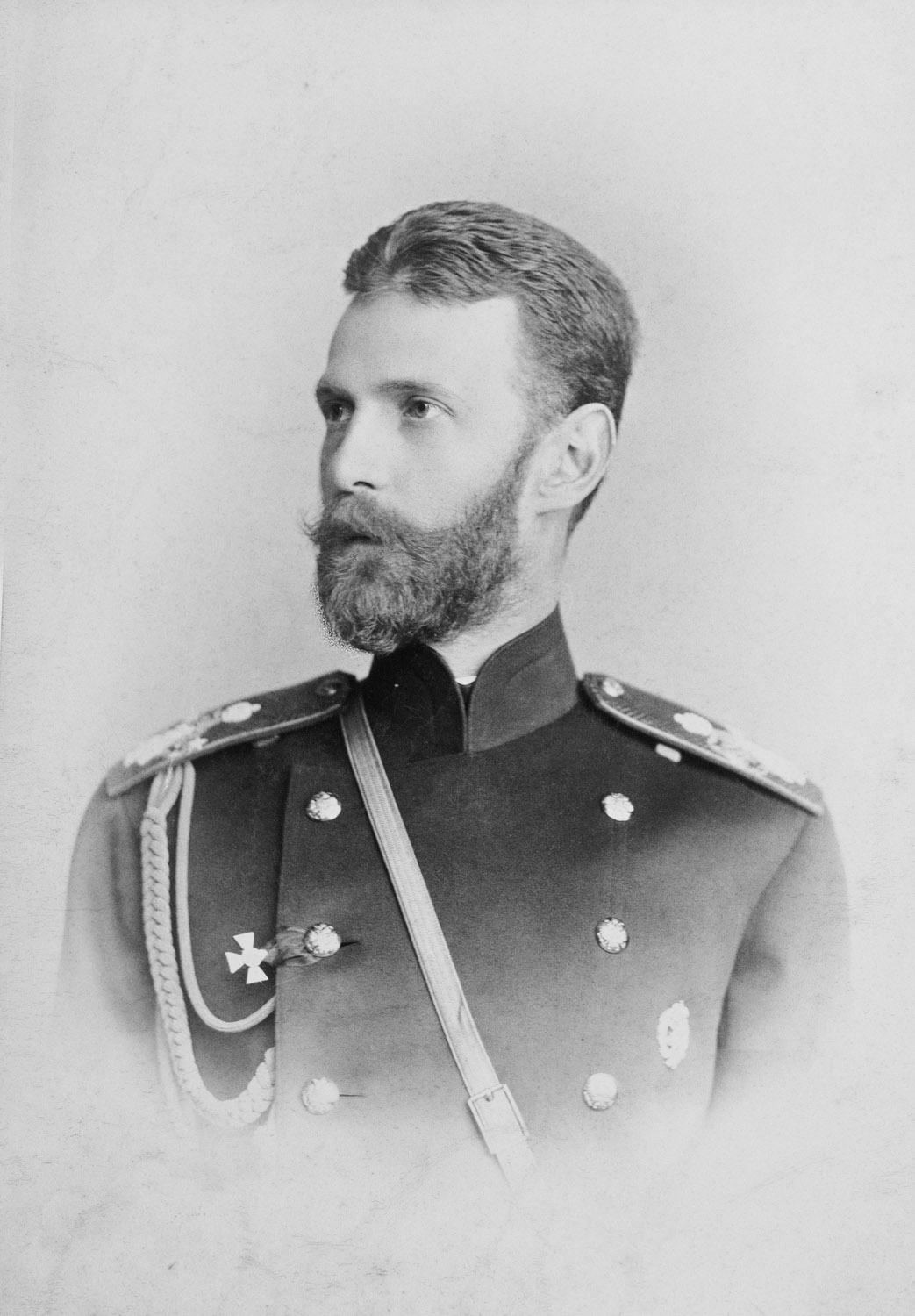
Grand Duke Sergei Alexandrovich of Russia

At twenty-six, the fair-haired Grand Duke was described as reserved, intelligent, well-read and refined. Over six feet tall, his slim figure was accentuated by a corset, worn in the manner of Prussian officers.

With his closely cropped hair and neat beard, Sergei Alexandrovich cut an impressive figure. When Consuelo Vanderbilt, then Duchess of Marlborough, met him in Moscow, she considered him to be "One of the most handsome men I have ever seen". He was described by his brother-in-law Ernest Louis, Grand Duke of Hesse, as "tall and fair with delicate features and beautiful light green eyes". Very self-conscious, he held himself very stiffly and with a hard expression in his eyes.

His health was seriously compromised as he suffered from osteoarticular tuberculosis, a condition he strove to conceal, but it caused all his joints to waste away. He had to take salts and hot baths to get some relief. He could not ride a horse and had to wear a spinal corset at all times. He stood very straight and had a habit of playing with one of his jeweled rings, turning it around his finger. He kept his feelings rigidly in check, and many mistook his reserve for pride. Few had the chance to know him well. He was noted for his adherence to the Church, took a deep interest in Russian antiques and art treasures, and was interested in archaeology, music and acting and sometimes chairing meetings of the Archaeological Congress.

While shy and reserved, he made no secret of his disapproval of fashionable society and its lax ways, and he defied all criticism. He found it hard to cope with opposition and easily lost his temper. In his home, he demanded tidiness, order, and discipline, and he expected to be obeyed. His niece, Marie, Queen of the Romanians, remembered him: "Dry, nervous, short of speech, impatient, he had none of the rather careless good humor of his three elder brothers ... but for all that we loved him, felt irresistibly attracted to him, hard though he could be. Few perhaps cherish his memory, but I do." Many other family members, including his nephew Kiril, Princess Marie of Greece and Prince Gabriel, included their good impressions of him in their memoirs.

== Marriage ==
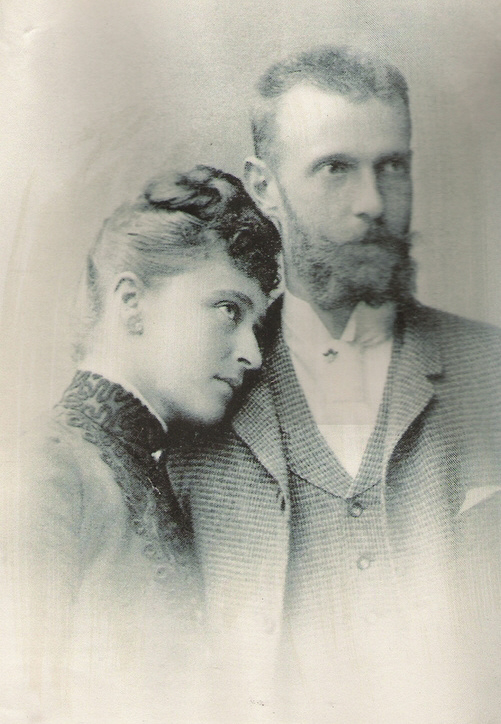
Grand Duke Sergei and his wife, Grand Duchess Elizabeth Feodorovna

In 1881 there had been talks of a possible marriage to Princess Caroline Mathilde of Schleswig-Holstein. Emperor Alexander II had hoped that at least one of his sons would marry a princess of Hesse as he had done. Sergei eventually chose as his bride Princess Elizabeth of Hesse, a daughter of Ludwig IV, Grand Duke of Hesse and by Rhine and Princess Alice of the United Kingdom. She was an older sister of both Ernst Ludwig, Grand Duke of Hesse and by Rhine and Alix of Hesse, later the Empress consort of Nicholas II of Russia and a niece of Prince Alfred, Duke of Edinburgh, who married his older sister Grand Duchess Maria Alexandrovna of Russia. They were first cousins once removed (i.e., Elizabeth's great-grandfather, her father's paternal grandfather, Louis II, Grand Duke of Hesse, was Sergei's maternal grandfather) and had known each other all their lives. There were hesitations on both sides and Elizabeth first rejected his proposal of marriage. Queen Victoria, who had anti-Russian sentiments, opposed the marriage of her motherless granddaughter. Elizabeth and her sisters were not pressured into following political marriages; they were allowed to follow their own inclination. After the couple spent some time together at Schloss Wolfsgarten in Darmstadt in September 1883, Elizabeth agreed to marry him. Their engagement was announced publicly on 26 February 1884 when Sergei returned to visit her in Darmstadt. Upon her marriage, Princess Elizabeth took the name of Grand Duchess Elizabeth Feodorovna of Russia. The wedding took place on 15 June 1884 in the Winter Palace.

They spent their honeymoon in Ilinskoye, Sergei's 2,400-acre (9.7 km^{2}) country estate forty miles west of Moscow on the left bank of the Moskva River, that he inherited from his mother. The couple later settled in Saint Petersburg in a mansion occupying the southeast corner of the Fontanka Canal and the Nevsky Prospekt, a short drive from his former apartments in the Winter Palace. The Beloselsky Belozersky mansion, bought by Sergei to live with his wife, was renamed Sergeivsky Palace. The couple also had Ferme, a villa located in the grounds of Peterhof that Sergei had inherited from his mother. They usually entertained at Ilinskoe during the summer months, with guests occupying various wooden villas dotted around the park. There was also Usovo, a substantial stone and brick house with an innovative central heating, that Sergei had built on the opposite bank of the Moskva River.

The couple was close to Alexander III and Maria Feodorovna, and the Tsar trusted Sergei more than his other brothers. In 1886, Alexander III appointed him commander of the Preobrazhensky Life Guard Regiment, entrusting him with introducing the Tsarevich (the future Nicholas II) to army life. Sergei and Ella represented Russia in 1887 during Queen Victoria's Golden Jubilee and in 1888, they were sent to the Holy Land on the occasion of the consecration of the Church of Mary Magdalene in Jerusalem built in memory of Empress Maria Alexandrovna. By 1892, eight years into the marriage, Sergei was already certain that they would not have children and he left a will making the children of his brother Paul his heirs after his and his wife's deaths.

=== Alleged Sexuality ===
It was likely that Sergei was gay or bisexual. Count Witte wrote that Sergei "was always surrounded by comparatively young men, who were excessively affectionate towards him." In her memoirs, Countess Lily de Nostitz said: "It was well known that the Grand Duke Sergei was one of those unhappy men cursed with the failing of loving only their own sex."

The diary of prominent St. Petersburg hostess Alexandra Bogdanovich refers to Sergei's alleged affairs with his aide-de-camps Martynov and Balyasny; while after Sergei was appointed Governor of Moscow, Count Vladimir Lamsdorf punned: "Moscow used to stand on seven hills, and now it has to stand on one hillock" – (the Russian word for 'hillock' sounding similar to the French word for bugger). Some reports suggest his sexuality might have conflicted with his intense religious beliefs and the expectations of his position.

== Governor of Moscow ==
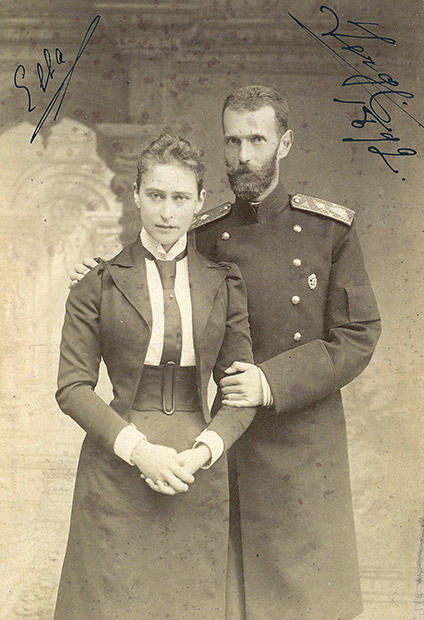
Grand Duke Sergei and his wife, 1892

Emperor Alexander III adopted a policy of repression, and he wanted a like mind at the helm of Imperial Russia's second city and former capital. Thus, in spring 1891, the tsar appointed Sergei as governor general of Moscow. Although it was a great honour, Grand Duke Sergei accepted his new appointment with reluctance. He had hoped to stay longer in command of the Preobrazhensky, where he was popular; and he and his wife loved the quiet life they were living in Saint Petersburg.

The vice-regal role of Governor-General ruling Prince of Moscow was one that was answerable only to the emperor. Grand Duke Sergei was a political hardliner who shared his brother's inalienable belief in strong, nationalist government. Sergei's tenure began with the expulsion of Moscow's 20,000 Jews. It started four weeks before he arrived in person, after the publication of an imperial ukase by the Minister of the Interior Ivan Durnovo, by which all Jews of lower social stance (artisans, minor traders and so on) had to be expelled from Moscow. On 29 March, the first day of Passover, the city's Jewish population learned of the new decree that called for their expulsion. In three carefully planned phases over the next twelve months, Moscow's Jews were expelled. Those first to go were the unmarried, the childless, and those who had lived in the city for less than three years. Next, it was the turn of apprentices, of families with up to four children, and those with less than six years residency. Last of all, it was the turn of the old Jewish settlers with large families and/or numerous employees, some of whom had lived in Moscow for forty years. Young Jewish women were made to register as prostitutes if they wanted to stay in the city.

During the expulsion, homes were surrounded by mounted Cossacks in the middle of the night while policemen ransacked every house. In January 1892, in a temperature of 30 degrees below zero, Brest station was packed with Jews of all ages and sexes, all in rags and surrounded by meager remnants of households goods, all leaving voluntarily rather than face deportation. Sergei as governor-general was petitioned by the police commissioners to stop the expulsions until the weather conditions improved. While he agreed, the order was not published until the expulsions were over. Some of them moved to southern and western regions of the empire although there were many who decided to emigrate. In counting the cost, Moscow lost 100 million rubles in trade and production, 25,000 Russians employed by Jewish firms lost their livelihoods, while the manufacture of silk, one of the city's most lucrative industries, was all but wiped out.

To meet the needs of students, Sergei ordered the start of the construction of new dormitories in the city. At the same time, however, severe restrictions were imposed on the students and professors in the universities as a part of the state's policy of conspiracy prevention and elimination of revolutionary ideas. This made Sergei Alexandrovich very unpopular in Moscow among intelligentsia, though the more conservative citizens were pleased. The Muscovite nobility and merchants despised him because he was rough and lacked tact while attempting to fight commercial fraud and enforce strict policy measures. However, he did significantly improve general living conditions during his tenure and was extremely conscientious in carrying out his duties: “Even in the country when he was supposed to be resting," his niece remembered, "he was constantly receiving couriers from Moscow and giving audiences.” He paid much attention to detail, attending personally to matters that could easily have been left to subordinates, punishing corruption and fraud. At times, he would go about the city incognito to see conditions for himself. In private, he and his wife were concerned about the poverty they saw in Moscow and the surrounding countryside, discussing ways to improve it.

Welfare organizations and charities always attracted Sergei's attention and he became either chairman or patron of scores of them. He was, for example, chairman of the Moscow Society for the Care, Upbringing, and Education of Blind Children; of the Society for Homeless, Neglected Children, and Convicted Adolescents; and the Moscow Department of the Russian Department Society of National Health Protection. In addition, he was a patron of organizations as diverse as the Moscow and Saint Petersburg Universities, The Printer's Mutual Aid Fund, the Society of Care for Aged Actors, the Pskov Non-Classical Secondary School, and Prince Nikola's Alm Houses. He was also chairman of the Academies of both Arts and Science, the Moscow Archeological Society, the Society of Agriculture, the Russian Musical Society, the Historical Museum in Moscow, and the Moscow Theological Academy among others.

== Khodynka Tragedy ==
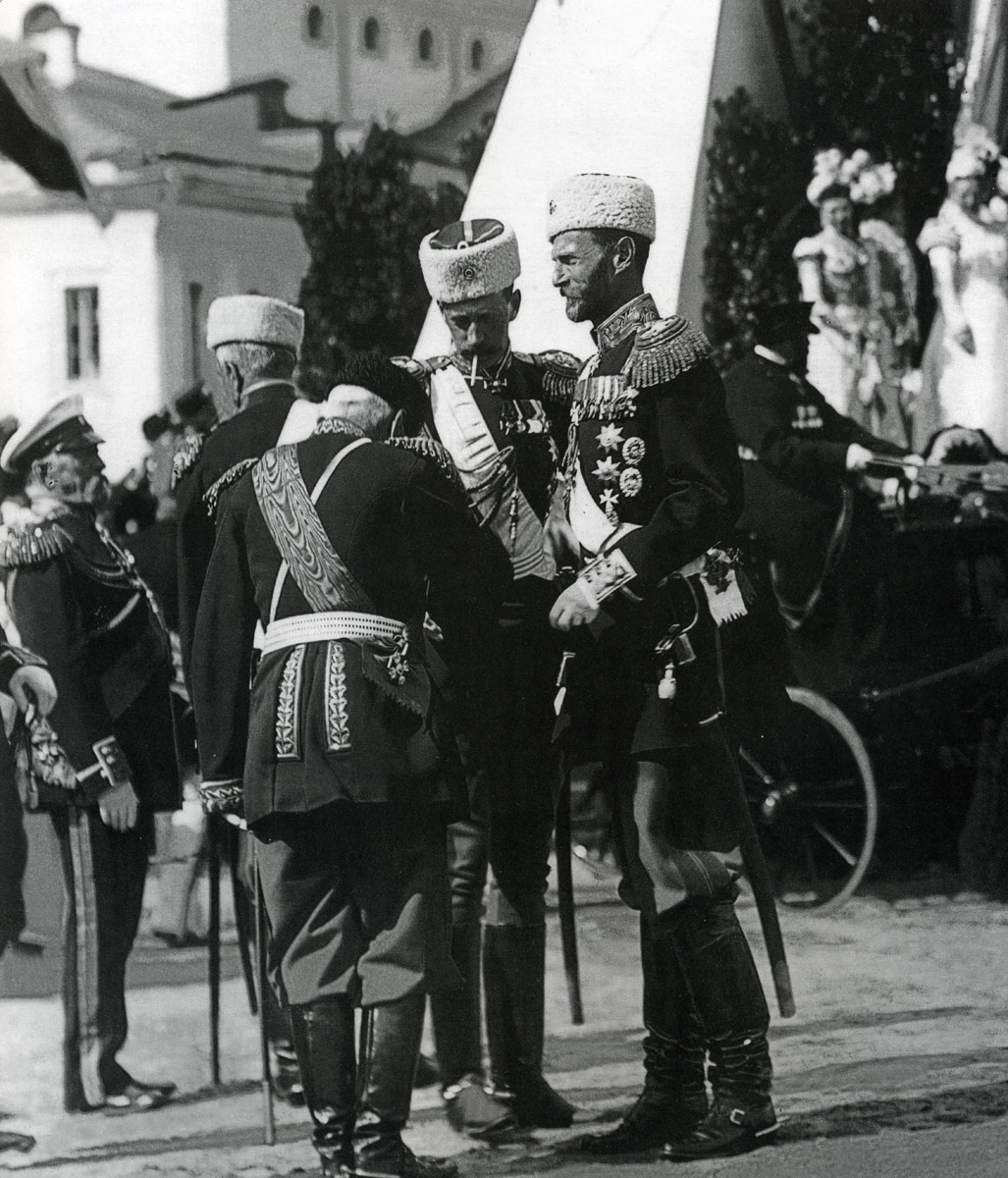
Grand Duke Sergei Alexandrovich (right) with his brother Grand Duke Paul Alexandrovich (center, smoking) on 14 May 1896, coronation of Nicholas II

Tsar Alexander III died on 1 November [O.S. 20 October] 1894 and his son Nicholas II ascended to the Russian throne. The relationship between Grand Duke Sergei and his nephew, who had served under his command in the Preobrazhensky Life Guard Regiment, was close and it became stronger with Nicholas II's marriage to Princess Alix of Hesse, the youngest sister of Sergei's wife—a union that Sergei and Elizabeth Feodorovna had helped to promote.

The coronation ceremonies of the new Emperor and his wife, as tradition demanded, took place in Moscow, and Sergei, as Governor General of the City, was in charge of overseeing the arrangements. As part of the preparations, Sergei had introduced the novelty of electric light to Moscow. Towards the end of the festivities, according to custom, every newly crowned Tsar presented gifts to the populace; Khodynka Field, on the outskirts of Moscow, was where the distribution had been held since the coronation of Tsar Alexander II. The choice was questionable, as the field was normally used as a military training ground and was crisscrossed with ditches. Nevertheless, Sergei, as Governor General approved the plans. Although a crowd of nearly half a million was expected from all over Russia, only one squadron of Cossacks and a small detachment of police were sent to maintain order.

Early in the morning of 30 May [O.S. 18 May] 1896, families began to gather outside the frail wooden fence that protected the field, watching carts laden with beer, and the eagerly sought after gifts. Around 6 am, a rumor swept through the massive crowd that the booths had already opened and the souvenirs were being given out. Suddenly moving as one, that great body of people began to surge forward in the direction of the booths. As it did so, men, women and children, hundreds of whom had no idea what was happening, fell or slipped on the uneven ground and were crushed and trampled underfoot. Others suffocated in the mayhem. The police, far too few in numbers, were helpless to do much and even the Cossacks when they arrived were unable to stop the catastrophe. One thousand three hundred people, many hideously mutilated and unrecognizable, were killed and twice that number were seriously injured.

While Grand Duke Sergei had not directly participated in the planning for Khodynka Field, he was blamed for the lack of foresight and as Governor-General, held as ultimately responsible. However, he did not assume his part of the responsibility for the tragedy. He laid the blame on others, most notably on Ilarion Count Voronzov-Dashkov, head of the Ministry of the Imperial Court, with whom there had been some dispute over the management of the coronation festivities, and Colonel Alexander Vlasovsky (1842–1899), the city of Moscow's Chief of Police. In the eyes of public opinion Sergei had done himself great harm by not going to the scene of the incident or at least putting in appearances at the victims' funerals, though it also reported that Sergei did feel deeply saddened by the disaster.

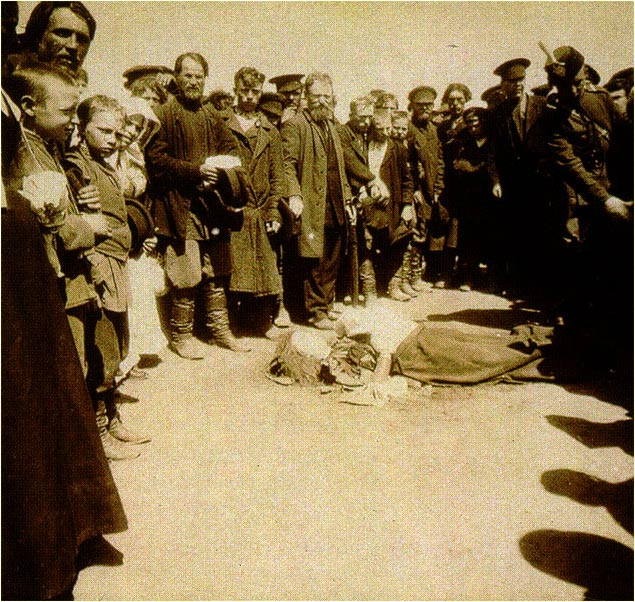
Victims of the stampede at Khodynka

After the tragedy, many members of the Romanov family, headed by Grand Duke Nicholas Mikhailovich and his brothers, thought that the remaining festivities should be canceled. On the other hand, Sergei Alexandrovich and his brothers thought that a historical event, such as a coronation, should not be disrupted or marred by a conspicuous period of mourning. The latter opinion believed that the crowds who came long distances should not be disappointed and that the tightly scheduled events for foreign dignitaries not be slighted and should go forward. There was also division among the Romanov family as to whether Grand Duke Sergei should have resigned. Grand Duke Nicholas Mikhailovich and his brothers called for his resignation, while Sergei's own brothers Grand Dukes Vladimir Alexandrovich and Alexei Alexandrovich closed ranks supporting him and threatened to retire from public life if Sergei was made the scapegoat for the Khodynka tragedy. Ultimately, Sergei offered to resign while Vorontzov-Dashkov did not. In the end, the Tsar did not support a thoroughly proposed investigation, the Chief of Police was dismissed, and Grand Duke Sergei retained his office.

The night of the tragedy Tsar Nicholas II, for diplomatic reasons, attended a ball in honor of the French; because of that, his reputation also suffered for what was perceived to be his lack of sympathy for the victims.

== Controversy ==
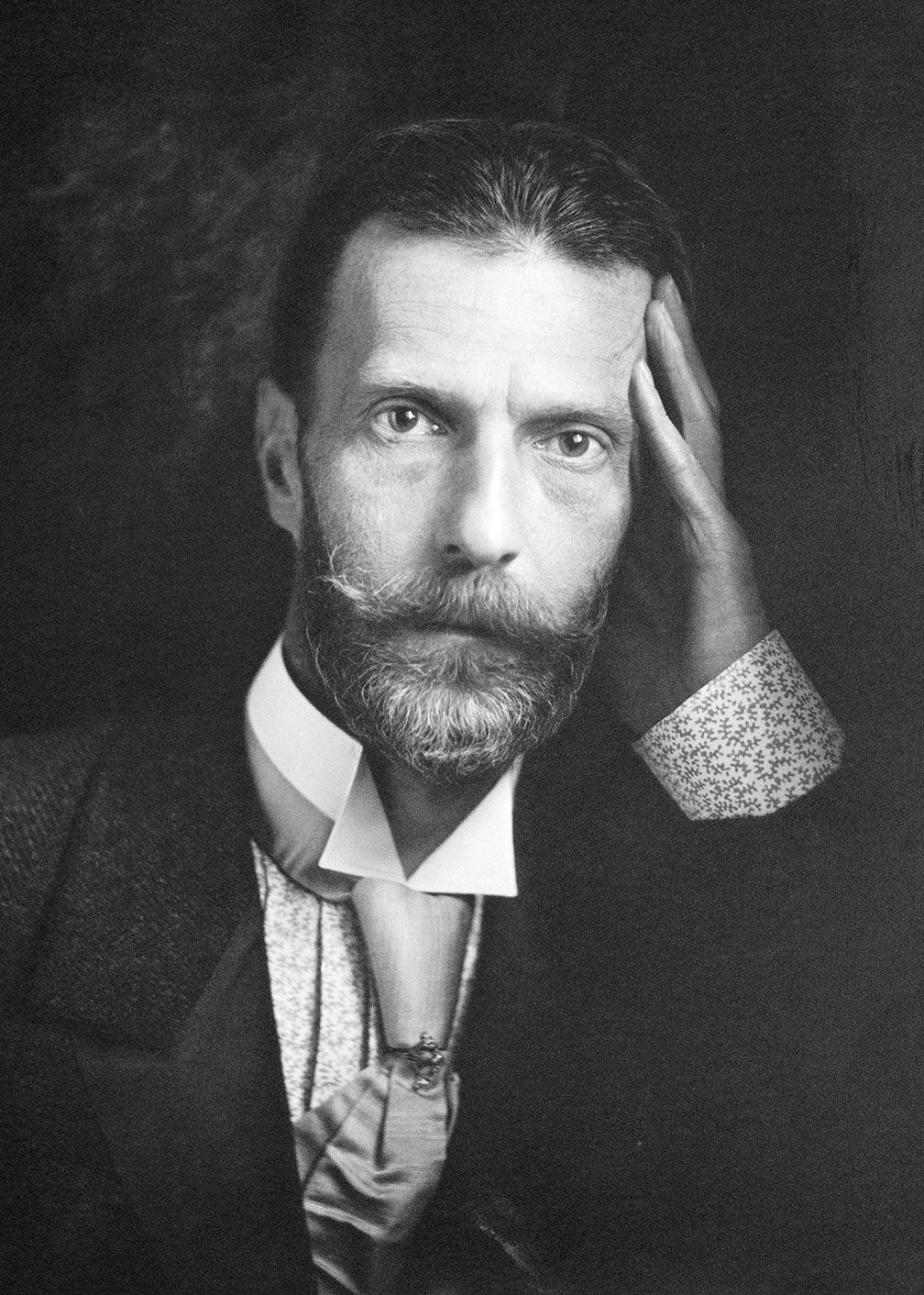
Grand Duke Sergei Alexandrovich

In 1894 Sergei was made a member of the State Council. In 1896, he was promoted to lieutenant general and appointed as Commander of Moscow military district. Because Sergei was devoted to the policies of his nephew, the Tsar regarded him as a useful counterweight to some of his ministers and officials and would always readily take his side. When, in 1896, disturbances broke out in the universities, Nicholas II was grateful for his prompt action and that of the authorities that quickly restored order.

Although Sergei was often condemned as a complete reactionary during his governorship, according to his brother-in-law Ernest, Grand Duke of Hesse, he wanted and strove for improvements, which angered conservatives, but blocked revolutionary reforms, which infuriated radicals, because he considered them impractical or thought that Russia was not ready for them.

Sergei's enigmatic personality and harsh manners made him appear arrogant and disagreeable. Shy by nature, he dreaded personal contact. When courtesy demanded a handshake, he solved the problem by wearing a white glove. Puritan and humourless, at least in public, he had a total disregard for public opinion. He never seemed to be at ease with himself and others. He became a focus for serious opponents of the regime as well as for malicious gossip. His cousin Grand Duke Alexander Mikhailovich left a damaging description about him: "Try as I will", he wrote, "I cannot find a single redeeming feature in his character… Obstinate, arrogant, disagreeable, he flaunted his many peculiarities in the face of the entire nation…". Later writers have accused him of sadism.

A great deal of controversy around Sergei Alexandrovich has centered on the nature of his personal life. Conjecture about the perhaps unhappy nature of the relationship with his wife has abounded.

Sergei's marriage is barely documented. His private papers, including his correspondence with his wife, have not survived, and the evidence that does exist in the Moscow State Archives, the most important repository of Romanov papers, is open to interpretation. Contrary to this belief, the marriage was happy, in its own way. They slept in the same bed for all of their married life. Forced to defend Sergei against rumors of discord, Elizabeth Feodorovna was devoted to her husband and treasured his memory after his death. Sergei's niece and foster-daughter Maria wrote about them: "she [Ella] and my uncle seemed never very intimate. They met for the most part only at meals and by day avoided being alone together. They slept, however, up to the last year of their life together, in the same great bed."

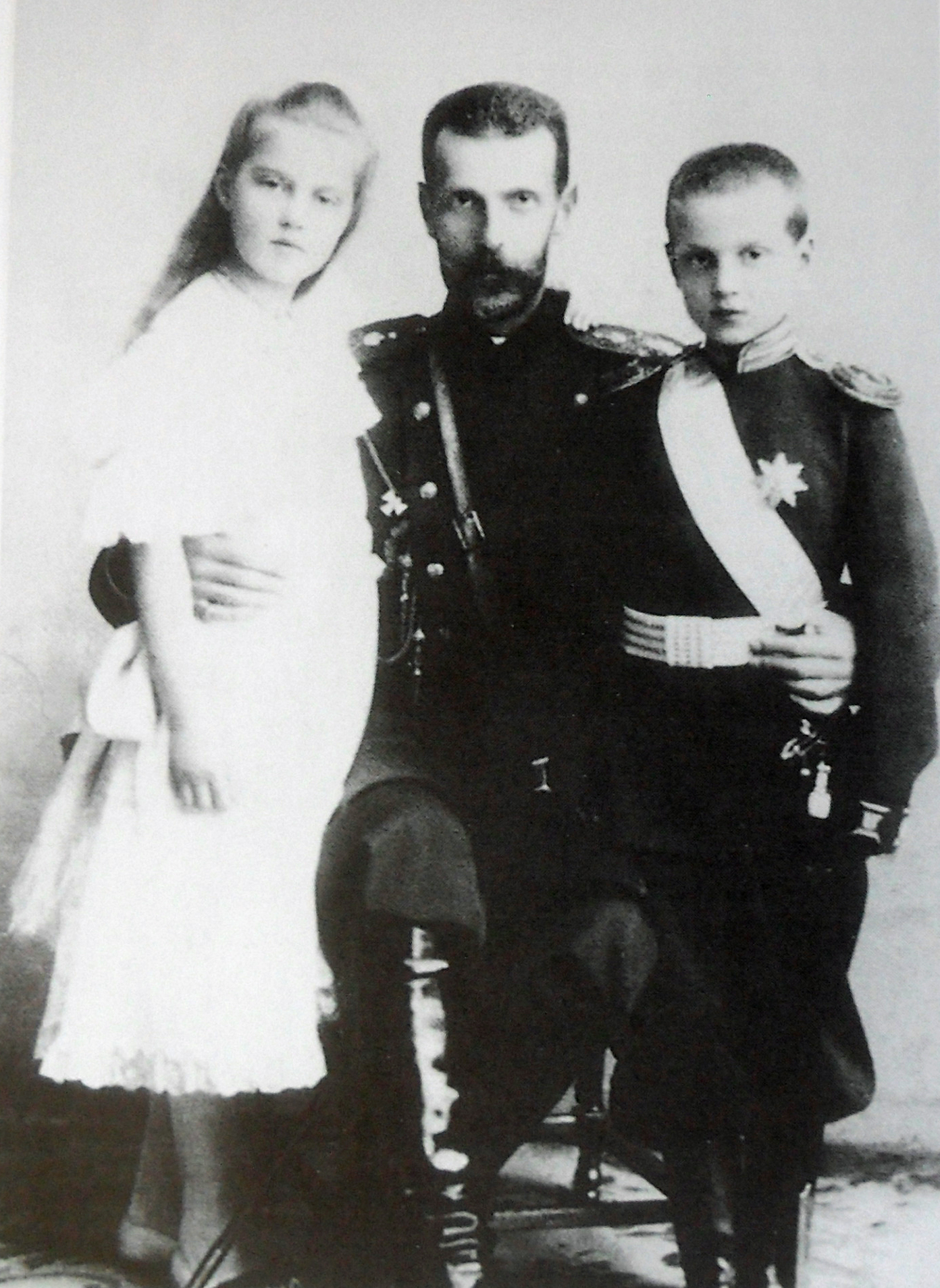
Grand Duke Sergei Alexandrovich of Russia with his foster children: Grand Duchess Maria Pavlovna Jr. and Grand Duke Dimitri Pavlovich

Although their marriage remained childless, the two children of Grand Duke Paul, Grand Duchess Maria and Grand Duke Dimitri, often joined their household, spending Christmases and later some summer holidays with Sergei and his wife. The couple set aside a playroom and bedrooms for the youngsters at their home. In 1902, Paul was banished from living in Russia after he contracted a morganatic marriage and Sergei asked for and obtained the guardianship of his niece and nephew. As a foster father, Sergei was strict and demanding, but devoted and affectionate towards the children. Nevertheless, Maria and Dimitri resented their aunt and uncle, blaming them for the forced separation from their real father, who had abandoned them. While Sergei had their best interests at heart, his preoccupation with the smallest detail of their education and upbringing were not appealing to the two difficult adolescents, especially the obstinate Maria.

By the end of 1904, Russia had suffered disastrously in the Russo-Japanese War and the country was in turmoil. As discontent and demonstration multiplied, so did the pressure on Sergei to maintain order. He was of the opinion that only the utmost severity could put an end to the revolutionary ferment, but in the wake of civil disorder Nicholas II was forced to make concessions. Sergei did not support the Tsar's security policies of vacillations and evasions. According to Marie Pavlovna, "it appeared to my uncle little less than monstrous ... he expressed deep sorrow for the state of affairs in Russia, of the necessity for serious measures, and of the criminal weakness of the Tsar's ministers and councilors". Thoroughly disillusioned with the whole situation and deciding it was the right time to retire into private life, he informed the Tsar that new times needed new faces. After thirteen years of service, Sergei resigned from the governorship on 1 January 1905 and was succeeded by Dmitri Feodorovich Trepov. However, he continued as commander of the Moscow military district.

== Assassination ==
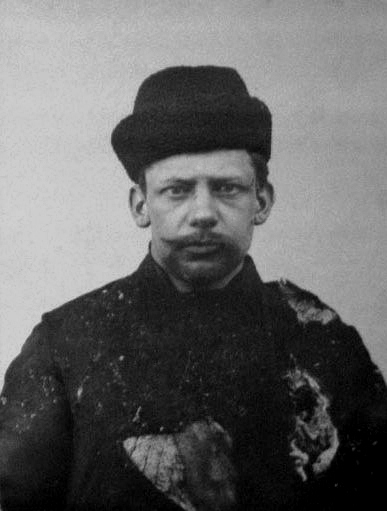
Assassin Ivan Kalyayev

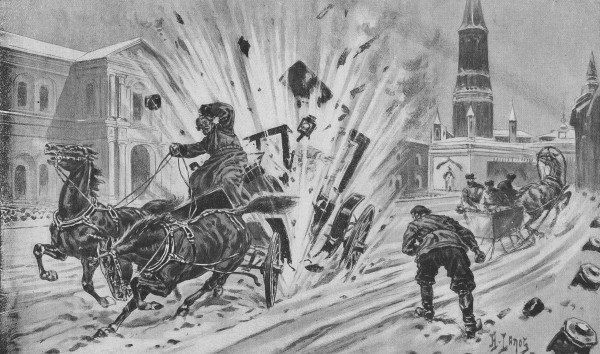
The assassination

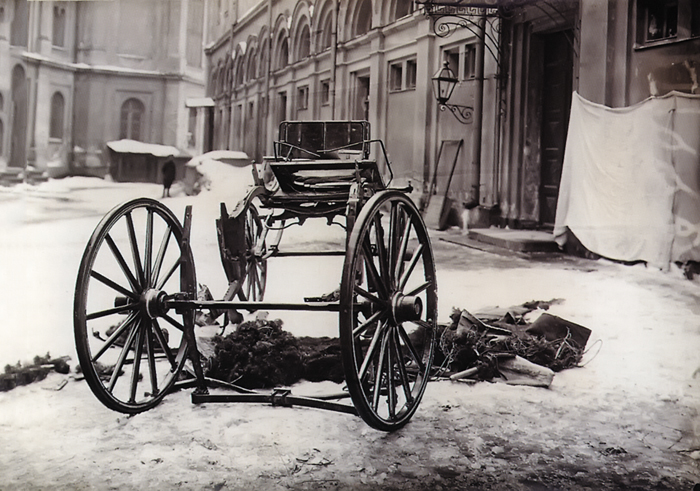
Remains of the carriage

Following his resignation, Grand Duke Sergei moved to the Neskuchnoye Palace with his wife and foster children. Shortly thereafter, they moved to the Nicholas Palace within the safety of the Kremlin, under the cover of night. Sergei took every precaution advised by his detectives. Sergei and his wife rarely ventured outside. At home, they only received their closest friends. Like his father, Alexander II, Sergei was firm of the belief that unless it was the will of God, no attempt on his life would succeed. If it were the will of God, no amount of security would prevent it. One precaution he did take was for the benefit of his adjutants, whom he would no longer allow to travel with him.

On 15 February 1905, the family attended a concert at the Bolshoi Theatre in aid of Elizabeth Feodorovna's Red Cross War charities. A terrorist organization that knew his route, the Socialist Revolutionary Party's combat detachment, had planned to assassinate him that day. However, one of their members, Ivan Kalyayev, noticed the children in the carriage and decided to call off their attack. To kill the Grand Duchess and the children would surely have sparked a wave of apprehension throughout the empire, and would have set back the revolutionary cause by years. Having had lunch with his wife at Nicholas Palace on 17 February, Sergei left unaccompanied for the Governor General's mansion. Because of the looming threat, Sergei had refused to take his adjutant, Alexei, since he was married and a father. The arrival of the Grand Duke's recognizable carriage, drawn by a pair of horses and driven by his coachman Andrei Rudinkin, alerted the terrorist who had been waiting in the Kremlin with a bomb wrapped in newspapers.

Just before 14:45, the carriage of the Grand Duke passed through the gate of Nikolskaya Tower of the Kremlin and turned the corner of the Chudov Monastery into Senatskaya Square. From a distance no more than four feet (1.2 m) away and still some 60 feet (18 m) inside the Nikolsky Gate, Ivan Kalyayev stepped forward and threw a nitroglycerin bomb directly into Sergei's lap. The explosion disintegrated the carriage and the Grand Duke died immediately. Scattered all over the bloodstained snow lay pieces of scorched cloth, fur, and leather. The body of the Grand Duke was mutilated, with the head, the upper part of the chest, and the left shoulder and arm blown off and completely destroyed. Some of the Grand Duke's fingers, still adorned with the rings he habitually wore, were found on the roof of a nearby building.

On impact, the carriage horses had bolted towards the Nikolsky Gate, dragging with them the front wheels and coachbox as well as the semi-conscious and badly burned driver, Rudinkin, whose back had been riddled with bits of bomb and stones. He was rushed to the nearest hospital, where he died three days later. Kalyayev, who by his own testimony had expected to die in the explosion, survived. Sucked into the vortex of the explosion, he ended up by the remains of the rear wheels. His face was peppered by splinters, pouring with blood. Kalyayev was immediately arrested, sentenced to death, and hanged two months later. The Grand Duchess rushed to the scene of the explosion. Stunned but perfectly controlled, she gave instructions, and, kneeling in the snow, helped to gather up Sergei's remains. The remains were placed on a stretcher and covered with an army greatcoat.

== Aftermath ==
According to Edvard Radzinsky, during the trial of Kalyayev:

Elizabeth spent all the days before the burial in ceaseless prayer. On her husband's tombstone she wrote: "Father, release them, they know not what they do." She understood the words of the Gospels heart and soul, and on the eve of the funeral she demanded to be taken to the prison where Kalyayev was being held. Brought into his cell, she asked, "Why did you kill my husband?" "I killed Sergei Alexandrovich because he was a weapon of tyranny. I was taking revenge for the people." "Do not listen to your pride. Repent... and I will beg the Sovereign to give you your life. I will ask him for you. I myself have already forgiven you." On the eve of revolution, she had already found a way out; forgiveness! Forgive through the impossible pain and blood -- and thereby stop it then, at the beginning, this bloody wheel. By her example, poor Ella appealed to society, calling upon the people to live in Christian faith. 'No!" replied Kalyayev. "I do not repent. I must die for my deed and I will... My death will be more useful to my cause than Sergei Alexandrovich's death." Kalyayev was sentenced to death. "I am pleased with your sentence,' he told the judges. 'I hope that you will carry it out just as openly and publicly as I carried out the sentence of the Socialist Revolutionary Party. Learn to look the advancing revolution right in the face."

Deeply affected by the Grand Duke's death, Grand Duchess Elizabeth Feodorovna retired from the royal family and founded the Russian Orthodox convent of Martha and Mary, where she dedicated herself to the care of Moscow's poor and suffering. Part of the obligations of the sisters of the Martha and Mary convent was to make an annual pilgrimage to the sepulchral church in memory of the Grand Duke on the day of his repose, 4 February. Elizabeth Feodorovna was murdered during the Russian Civil War in 1918, together with many other Romanov relatives. Her body and that of a fellow nun was smuggled to China and eventually reached Jerusalem. The wooden coffins were met at the railway station by the deputy British governor, Sir Harry Charles Luke, and taken for burial at the Church of Mary Magdalene on the Mount of Olives.

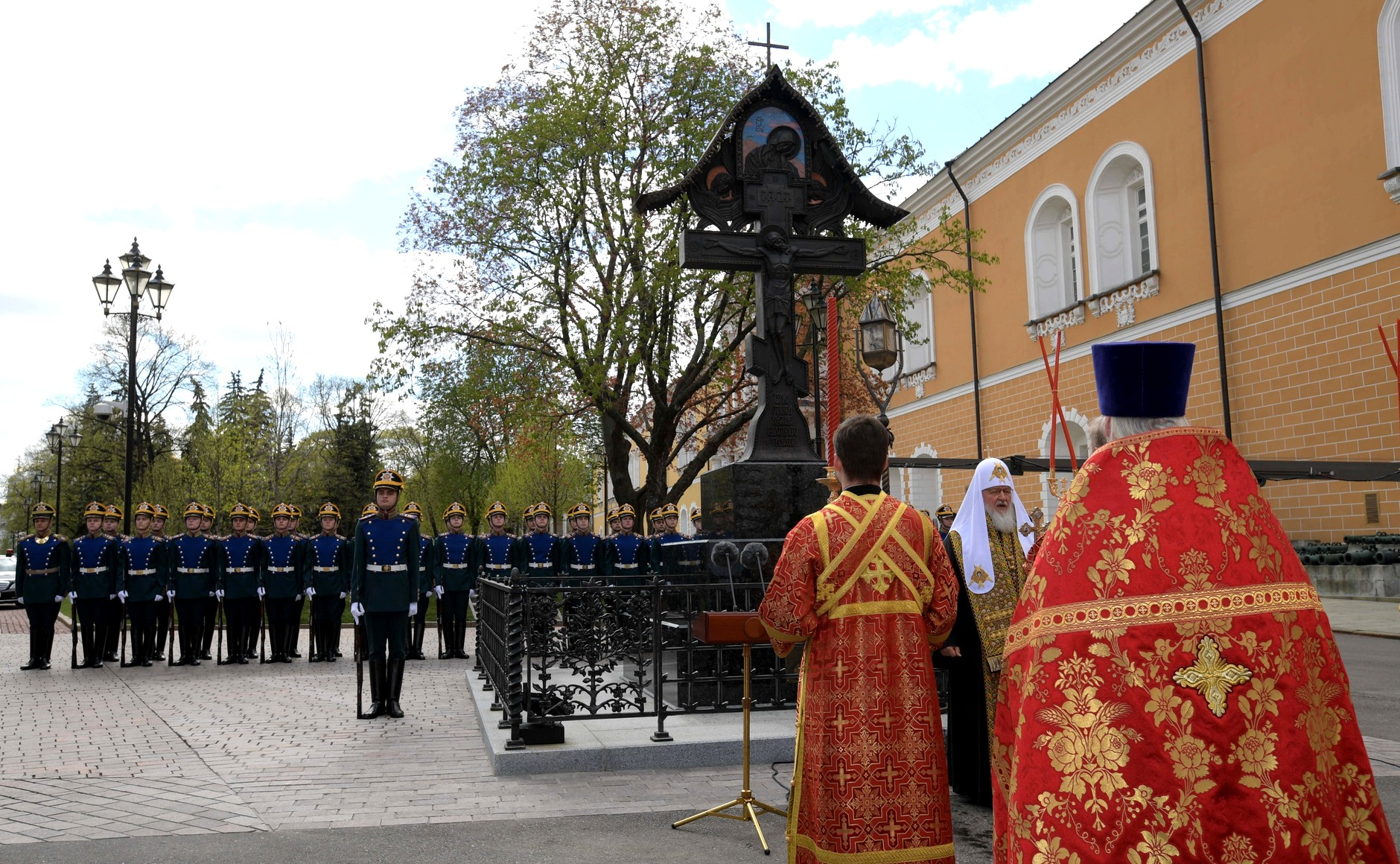
Rededication of the memorial, 4 May 2017

Grand Duke Sergei's body was buried in a crypt of the Chudov Monastery within the precincts of the Moscow Kremlin. A memorial cross, created from public donations, was erected on the spot where he was killed in 1908. After the downfall of the Romanovs, the cross was destroyed with the personal participation of Vladimir Lenin.

Chudov Monastery was demolished in 1928, and the Presidium of the Supreme Soviet was built on the site. The burial crypt of the Grand Duke was located in a courtyard of that building, which had been used as a parking lot. In 1990, building workers in the Kremlin discovered the blocked up entrance of the burial vault. The coffin was examined and found to contain the Grand Duke's remains, covered with the military greatcoat of the Kiev regiment, decorations, and an icon. He had left written instructions that he was to be buried in the Preobrazhensky Lifeguard regiment uniform, but as his body was so badly mutilated this proved impossible. In 1995, the coffin was officially exhumed, and after a Panikhida in the Kremlin Cathedral of the Archangel, it was reburied in a vault of the Novospassky Monastery in Moscow on 17 September 1995.

On 4 May 2017, Sergei's memorial cross was restored in a ceremony that was attended by President Vladimir Putin and Patriarch Kirill of Moscow.

== Orders and decorations ==
National

- Knight of St. Andrew, 1857
- Knight of St. Alexander Nevsky, 1857
- Knight of the White Eagle, 1857
- Knight of St. Anna, 1st Class, 1857
- Knight of St. Stanislaus, 1st Class, 11 June 1865
- Knight of St. George, 4th Class, 20 October 1877
- Knight of St. Vladimir, 4th Class, 15 May 1883; 3rd Class, 30 August 1890; 1st Class, 15 May 1893
- Silver Commemorative Medal for the Reign of Emperor Alexander III, 17 March 1896
- Commemorative Medal for the Coronation of Emperor Nicholas II, 13 June 1896

Foreign

- Austria-Hungary:
  - Grand Cross of St. Stephen, 1874
  - Commemoration Medal for the Golden Jubilee of Emperor Franz Joseph I
- Bavaria: Knight of St. Hubert
- Belgium: Grand Cordon of the Order of Leopold
- Bukhara:
  - Order of Noble Bukhara, in Diamonds
  - Order of the Sun of Alexander
- Bulgaria: Grand Cross of St. Alexander
- Denmark: Knight of the Elephant, 3 August 1876
- (Saxe-Coburg and Gotha) (Duchy of Saxe-Altenburg) (Saxe-Meiningen) Ernestine duchies: Grand Cross of the Saxe-Ernestine House Order, 1878
- Ethiopia: Grand Cross of the Seal of Solomon
- France: Grand Cross of the Legion of Honour, 20 June 1891
- Greece: Grand Cross of the Redeemer
- Hesse and by Rhine:
  - Grand Cross of the Ludwig Order, 8 June 1857
  - Knight of the Golden Lion, 15 June 1884
- Italy: Knight of the Annunciation, 15 April 1881
- Sovereign Military Order of Malta: Bailiff Grand Cross of Honour and Devotion
- Japan: Grand Cordon of the Order of the Chrysanthemum, 8 September 1900
- Mecklenburg:
  - Grand Cross of the Wendish Crown, with Crown in Ore
  - Military Merit Cross, 1st Class (Schwerin)
- Montenegro: Grand Cross of the Order of Prince Danilo I
- Netherlands: Grand Cross of the Netherlands Lion
- Oldenburg: Grand Cross of the Order of Duke Peter Friedrich Ludwig, with Golden Crown and Collar
- Ottoman Empire: Order of Osmanieh, 1st Class with Diamonds
- Prussia:
  - Knight of the Black Eagle, 10 June 1871
  - Pour le Mérite (military), 22 March 1879
  - Service Medal for Officers (25 years)
- Persian Empire: Order of the August Portrait
- Romania:
  - Grand Cross of the Star of Romania
  - Commemoration Medal for the Russo-Turkish War
  - Crossing of the Danube Cross (military)
- Saxe-Weimar-Eisenach: Grand Cross of the White Falcon, 1873
- Serbia: Grand Cross of the White Eagle
- (Thailand) Siam: Knight of the Order of the Royal House of Chakri, 4 July 1897
- Sweden-Norway: Knight of the Seraphim, 19 July 1875
- United Kingdom:
  - Honorary Grand Cross of the Bath (civil), 21 June 1887
  - Commemoration Medal for the Golden Jubilee of Queen Victoria
- Württemberg: Grand Cross of the Württemberg Crown, 1871

== See also ==
- Bibliography of the Russian Revolution and Civil War
- Outline of the Russian Revolution and Civil War
- Index of articles related to the Russian Revolution and Civil War
- Russian Compound

== Bibliography ==
- Alexander, Grand Duke of Russia. Once a Grand Duke, Cassell, London, 1932.
- Chavchavadze, David. The Grand Dukes, Atlantic, 1989, ISBN 0-938311-11-5
- Cowles, Virginia. The Romanovs, Harper & Row, 1971, ISBN 0-06-010908-4
- Croft, Christina. Most Beautiful Princess Hilliard & Croft 2008, ISBN 0-9559853-0-7
- King, Greg. The Court of the Last Tsar, Wiley, 2006, ISBN 978-0-471-72763-7.
- King, Greg. The Last Empress, Citadel Press Book, 1994. ISBN 0-8065-1761-1
- Mager, Hugo. Elizabeth: Grand Duchess of Russia, Da Capo Press, 1999, ISBN 0-7867-0678-3
- Lincoln, W. Bruce. The Romanovs: Autocrats of All the Russias, Anchor, ISBN 0-385-27908-6.
- Mikhailova, Valeria. Elizabeth and Sergei: A Story of Love, A History of Lies. Royal Russia. N 10, 2016. ISBN 978-1-927604-20-5.
- Marie, Grand Duchess of Russia. Education of a Princess, Viking Press, 1931; ISBN 1-4179-3316-X
- Maylunas, Andrei and Mironenko, Sergei. A Lifelong Passion: Nicholas and Alexandra Their Own Story Dukes, Doubleday, 1997, ISBN 0-385-48673-1.
- Perry, John and Pleshakov, Constantine. The Flight of the Romanovs, Basic Books, 1999, ISBN 0-465-02462-9.
- Van der Kiste, John. The Romanovs 1818–1959, Sutton Publishing, 1999, ISBN 0-7509-2275-3.
- Warwick, Christopher. Ella: Princess, Saint and Martyr, Wiley, 2007 ISBN 0-470-87063-X
- Zeepvat, Charlotte. The Camera and the Tsars, Sutton Publishing, 2004, ISBN 0-7509-3049-7.
- Zeepvat, Charlotte. Romanov Autumn: stories from the last century of Imperial Russia. Sutton Publishing, 2000. ISBN 9780750923378
