= Charles Abbott Miner =

American industrialist and politician from Pennsylvania (1830–1903)

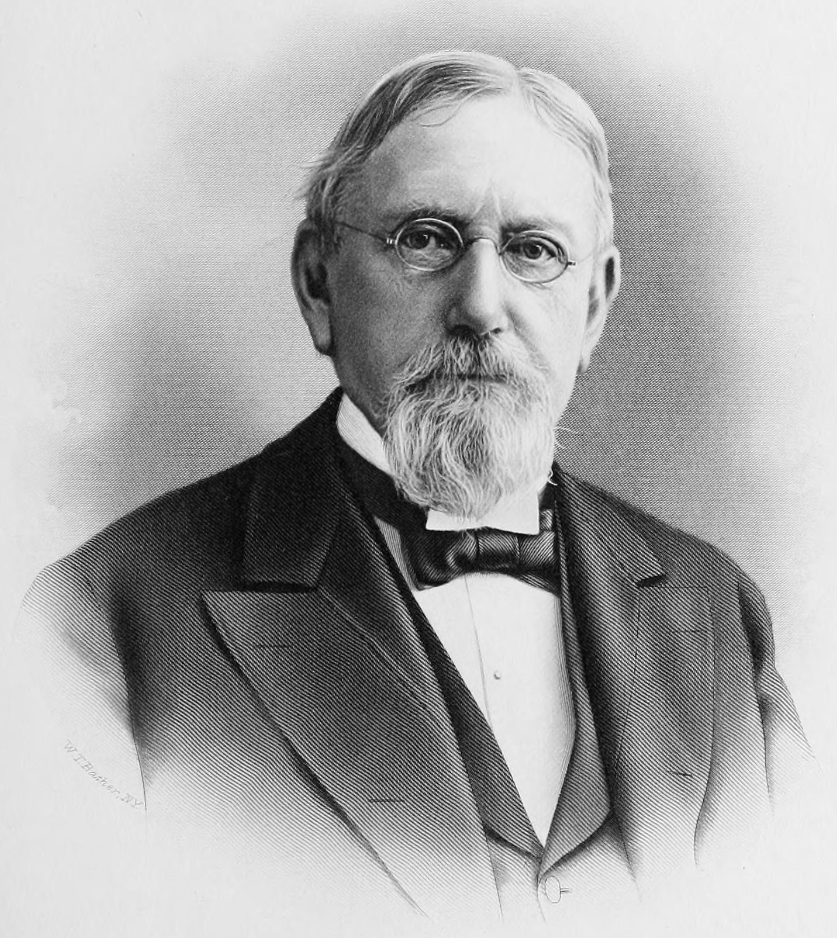

Member of the Pennsylvania House of Representatives
- In office 1875–1880
- Constituency: Wilkes-Barre

Personal details
- Born: August 30, 1830 Plains Township, Pennsylvania, U.S.
- Died: July 25, 1903 (aged 72) Wilkes-Barre, Pennsylvania, U.S.
- Party: Republican
- Spouse: Eliza Ross Atherton (m. 1853)
- Children: 6
- Occupation: Industrialist, politician

Charles Abbott Miner (August 30, 1830 – July 25, 1903) was an American industrialist and politician. He was affiliated with the Republican Party and served three terms (1875–1880) in the Pennsylvania House of Representatives as a state legislator from Wilkes-Barre.

== Biography ==
Charles Abbott Miner was born in Plains Township, Pennsylvania on August 30, 1830.

He married Eliza Ross Atherton on January 19, 1853, and they had six children.

He died at his home in Wilkes-Barre, Pennsylvania on July 25, 1903.
