= Charles Minor (Arkansas politician) =

American lawyer and politician from Arkansas (1841–1881)

Charles Minor (September 27, 1841 – February 27, 1881) was a lawyer and politician in Arkansas. He served in the Arkansas House of Representatives. He served two terms in the Arkansas House. He testified he lived in Jackson County.

== Early life ==
Minor was born September 27, 1841 in Charlottesville, Virginia to Dr Charles and Lucy Minor. He went to the University of Virginia before signing up to the Confederate Army to serve first as a private in the Rockbridge Artillery and then as a Lieutenant in the Engineer Corps until the end of the American Civil War.

== Law career and marriage ==
He moved to Jacksonport, Arkansas in October 1866. He studied law and was admitted to the Arkansas bar in 1868 and started practice as a lawyer. He married Kate Board June 8, 1869 and he remained with her until his death.

== Political career ==
Minor was elected to serve in the Arkansas House of Representatives and served from 1873 until 1879. He was involved in the impeachment of Powell Clayton. He voted to impeach Chief Justice John McClure.

== Death ==
Minor died February 27, 1881 at the house of John B. Minor at the University of Virginia.
