= Charles W. Miner =

American photographer (1866–1912)

Charles Winslow Miner
- Born: January 26, 1866; Columbia City, Indiana, U.S.
- Died: May 22, 1912 (aged 46); Fort Wayne, Indiana, U.S.
- Occupation: Photographer
- Years active: Late 1880s–1912
- Known for: Studio portraits and commercial photographs of Fort Wayne, Indiana landmarks
- Spouse: Mary S. Criswell (m. 1905)
- Children: Two daughters: Sarah and Mildred

Charles Winslow Miner (January 26, 1866 – May 22, 1912) was a well-known Fort Wayne, Indiana, photographer in the late 1890s and early 1900s. A native of Columbia City, Indiana, Miner moved to Fort Wayne around 1887 and established Miner's Studio on West Wayne Street in downtown Fort Wayne. Miner is best known for his studio portraits and commercial photographs of landmarks in Allen County, Indiana, especially the Allen County Courthouse and notable Fort Wayne businesses. His photographs were published in Fort Wayne booster books in the early 1900s.

== Early life and career ==
Miner was born on January 26, 1866, in Columbia City, Indiana. He was the son of Simon P. and Melissa Miner, Ohio natives who moved to Columbia City in the mid-1800s. Charles became interested in photography at an early age, and was apprenticed to Columbia City photographer Levi Monroe "Roe" Jones, who was known for his large-size portraits. Jones trained Miner to run a photography studio, handle clients, and the technical processes for "toning, developing, enlarging, printing, and framing" photographs.

Miner began work as a traveling photographer at the age of seventeen, and spent time in Canada as a landscape photographer. Around 1887, when he was in his early twenties, Miner moved to Fort Wayne, where he resided for the remainder of his life and continued his career as a photographer.

== Marriage and family ==
Miner married Mary S. Criswell, an Ohio native and resident of Fort Wayne, on November 28, 1905. The couple had two daughters, Sarah, who was born around 1908, and Mildred, born around 1912.

== Photography studio ==
After his move to Fort Wayne around 1887, Miner spent a few years working in the photography studio of Felix Schanz, "an established and influential Fort Wayne photographer," whose studio was located at 112 Calhoun Street. (The address was later changed to 922 Calhoun Street.)

In 1893 Miner established a photography business with William G. Dexter as his partner. The following year the two men opened Miner and Dexter Studio at 44 Calhoun Street in Fort Wayne. Three years later Miner bought out his partner and established his own studio in the 700 block of Calhoun Street above a dry-goods store.

In 1898, after nearly a decade in Fort Wayne, Miner moved his growing business to 23 West Wayne Street. (The street address was renumbered as 102 West Wayne Street in 1902, and changed to 121 West Street around 1910.) The photo studio was located in a busy downtown Fort Wayne business district near the intersection of West Wayne and South Calhoun Streets. Miner designed the new studio according to his own plans and installed the latest equipment. He renamed the business Miner's Studio in 1909.

Miner established his reputation by photographing notable local figures, and became known for his portraits, photo enlargements, and "color work." He was also known for his commercial photography of Fort Wayne architecture. Miner's photographs were used to promote the city's economic and business development in the early 1900s. In addition to his photography business, Miner was active in the local Elks Lodge and a member of the Knights of Pythias.

Following Miner's death in 1912, his wife, Mary, continued to operate the studio with the assistance of Estella Miner, who was one of Charles's cousins, and John D. Albrecht, who was Miner's technical assistant. After Mary's death a year later, a Japanese-born photographer named Henry Yoshinobu Ozaki, who once worked for Miner, became the studio's proprietor. Ozaki took over the business in 1917 and renamed the studio to his own name, but continued to operate at the same location until 1921.

== Works ==
- A photo mural of John Bass (a Fort Wayne industrialist) is installed in the John H. Bass Mansion (known as Brookside) at the University of Saint Francis in Fort Wayne.
- Miner's photography appears in:
  - The Beautiful City of Fort Wayne (1906).
  - Fort Wayne with Might and Main (1911).

== Death and legacy ==
Miner suffered a severe asthma attack in November 1911, and his health declined in subsequent months. Miner died at his home on East Wayne Street in Fort Wayne on May 22, 1912. He was forty-six years old. Miner's wife, Mary, who suffered from a lung ailment (probably tuberculosis), died on May 3, 1913. Their two daughters were raised by relatives.

Miner's work is found in the collections of the Allen County-Fort Wayne Historical Society and the Indiana Historical Society. The IHS re-created the interior of Miner's Studio, ca. 1904, as part of its "You Are There" exhibitions at the Eugene and Marilyn Glick Indiana History Center in Indianapolis.
