= Joseph B. Rose =

American urban planner and real estate developer

- Born: Joseph Benedict Rose; 1959 (age 66–67); New York City, U.S.
- Education: Yale University (BA)
- Occupations: Urban planner, real estate developer, professor
- Years active: 1981–present
- Spouse: Wendi Rose (m. 1996; div. 2010)
- Children: 2
- Parent(s): Daniel Rose; Joanna Semel Rose
- Relatives: David S. Rose (brother); Gideon Rose (brother); Frederick P. Rose (uncle); Jonathan F. P. Rose (cousin); David Rose (great uncle)

Joseph Benedict Rose (born 1959) is an American urban planner, real estate developer and academic. From 1994 to 2002 he chaired the New York City Planning Commission while simultaneously directing the New York City Department of City Planning, serving throughout the mayoralty of Rudolph Giuliani. He subsequently moved into private development, first as a general partner of The Georgetown Company and later through Rose Urban Strategies, a firm he founded. He has taught at the Yale School of Architecture since 2022.

== Early life and education ==
Rose was born in New York City in 1959, one of four children of the real estate developer and essayist Daniel Rose and the philanthropist Joanna Semel Rose. He grew up in Manhattan in a family with a long history of involvement in the city's civic life.

Rose attended P.S. 6, the Dalton School, and the Horace Mann School, graduating from Horace Mann in 1977, and received his undergraduate degree from Yale University; he went on to graduate study in government at Harvard University. His interest in the workings of the city surfaced early. His senior-year independent project at Horace Mann examined the construction of City Water Tunnel No. 3, the third of the city's water tunnels, and at Yale his focus on housing and planning was sharpened by a seminar with Roger Starr—the city's former housing administrator, then a New York Times editorial writer, and a family friend—and by "Introduction to the Study of the City," the Yale College course taught by Alexander Garvin, whom Rose would later appoint to the Planning Commission in 1995.

== Early career and civic work ==
Rose began his career at the Democratic National Committee, then spent 1981 to 1983 on the staff of Senator Daniel Patrick Moynihan of New York, handling urban policy as a special assistant. During the 1980s he chaired Manhattan Community Board 5, whose district covers Midtown, for three terms, and while in that role started the Midtown Children's Project, a charity bringing educational and recreational activities to homeless families. In 1988 he made an unsuccessful run for the New York State Senate, losing a Democratic primary to the incumbent Senate minority leader Manfred Ohrenstein.

He then led the Citizens Housing and Planning Council (CHPC), a housing and planning policy nonprofit, as its executive director from 1989 to 1993. During those years he directed research into the city's vast holdings of in rem buildings—properties New York had taken over from tax-delinquent owners—and the resulting study mapped a strategy for working through the backlog while helping to unlock federal money for the construction of affordable housing. In 2019, CHPC gave Rose its Roger Starr Public Service Award—named for his onetime teacher, who had himself run the council decades earlier.

== New York City Planning Commission ==
When Rudolph Giuliani became mayor in January 1994, he named Rose to the twin posts of Planning Commission chairman and City Planning Department director. The New York City charter assigns the offices he held "primary responsibility for the growth, improvement and future development of the city." Rose held both jobs for the administration's full eight years; when he stepped down in 2002, no chairman in the commission's history had served longer.

Despite a reputation as "an unlikely foil to the city's development interests," Rose pushed rezonings across large stretches of the five boroughs designed to raise the volume of homebuilding, a policy CHPC credits with helping the city's yearly housing output to triple. His department drew up the earliest official plans to extend the Midtown business core westward toward the Hudson rail yards—the area later developed as Hudson Yards—and to bring the No. 7 subway there, proposing that the new line be paid for out of tax revenue generated by the growth it would enable, an application of value capture financing. Other measures adopted on his watch included New York's first zoning controls on the spread of adult entertainment businesses, the city's first mixed-use zoning districts, and a preservation program for the Broadway theaters built around a reworked form of transferable development rights. His office also carried out the land-use planning that created Hudson River Park. In Lower Manhattan, where office vacancies had soared following the recession of the early 1990s, incentive and regulatory programs backed by the commission drew investment into aging Financial District towers and enabled many to be remade as apartment buildings.

Rose was the city's lead planner and negotiator on the rebuilding of Columbus Circle, which produced the Time Warner Center, gave Jazz at Lincoln Center its performance home, and remade the circle's roadways and pedestrian spaces. He was also involved in the Museum of Modern Art's expansion, the minor-league ballparks built in Coney Island and on Staten Island, and the effort to secure a permanent building for the Alvin Ailey American Dance Theater.

In 1999, Rose delivered a zoning-reform speech—described as proposing the first major overhaul of the city's zoning laws in 40 years—that called for height limits on tall buildings while allowing exceptions for buildings of high architectural quality. The proposal was prompted in part by Donald Trump's plans for a 90-story apartment tower on Manhattan's East Side. That December his department released the formal plan, the "Unified Bulk Program," a comprehensive rewrite of the rules governing the height and shape of buildings that would, for the first time, have set height limits in every neighborhood outside the central business districts. Rose sought to have the package adopted by the City Council before the end of the Giuliani administration, in the New York Observer's words "achieving the rare feat of uniting the Municipal Art Society and the Real Estate Board of New York in opposition".

== Private-sector real estate development ==
Rose left city government in 2002 for The Georgetown Company, where he became a general partner. His best-known project there was the IAC Building, the headquarters that IAC built on the waterfront in West Chelsea. Completed in 2007 to a Frank Gehry design—the first work of architecture Gehry built in New York—it is credited with spurring the redevelopment of the surrounding blocks. Rose later established his own firm, Rose Urban Strategies, and has developed and invested in commercial, residential, and recreational real estate around the country.

== Academic career ==
Since 2022 Rose has been a Lecturer at the Yale School of Architecture, teaching "Introduction to Planning and Development," a course on how considerations of financial and political feasibility mold buildings and the built environment. The course had long been taught by his mentor Alexander Garvin (1941–2021), a member of the Yale faculty for more than five decades, and Rose took it over following Garvin's death. His earlier academic appointments included an adjunct assistant professorship in Columbia University's architecture and planning school and a visiting scholar position at New York University's Wagner School. Beyond those appointments, he has given lectures at the Urban Land Institute, Princeton University, the Harvard Graduate School of Design, and NYU's law school. His writing on cities and planning has appeared in the Journal of the American Planning Association and in National Affairs, The New Republic, The Public Interest, City Journal, and The New York Times.

== Non-profit and civic activity ==
Rose helped organize the Daniel Rose Center for Public Leadership—created in 2008 through a gift honoring his father, and operated by the Urban Land Institute together with the National League of Cities—and chairs its advisory board; the center runs fellowships that coach mayors and their senior officials in land-use leadership. Among the other charities he has helped start are the Hilltop Cares Foundation and the Gateway School's center for educational enrichment, in addition to the Midtown Children's Project of his community-board years.

His board and trustee service has included the Madison Square Park Conservancy, the Urban Land Institute, the Hudson River Park Trust and its philanthropic affiliate Hudson River Park Friends, and the business improvement district for the Flatiron and NoMad neighborhoods. He also holds a seat on the Village of East Hampton's zoning board of appeals. At Yale, he serves on the architecture school's Dean's Council and is a fellow of Yale's Davenport College. He also belongs to the Council on Foreign Relations.

== Personal life ==
Rose married Wendi B. Rose, the daughter of the New York real estate developer Marshall Rose—who was not a blood relation—in 1996; the couple separated in 2010 and later divorced, and they have two adult children.

Government offices
Preceded by Richard L. Schaffer	Chair of the New York City Planning Commission; Director of the New York City Department of City Planning; 1994–2002	Succeeded by Amanda Burden
