= Jonathan F. P. Rose =

American property developer (born 1952)

- Born: 1952 (age 73–74); New Rochelle, New York
- Education: B.A. Yale University; MRP University of Pennsylvania
- Occupations: Planner, Real Estate Developer, Author
- Known for: Founder and president of Jonathan Rose Companies; Founded Gramavision Records; co-founded Garrison Institute, author of The Well-Tempered City
- Spouse: Diana Calthorpe Rose
- Children: 2
- Parent(s): Sandra Priest Rose; Frederick P. Rose
- Family: David Rose (great-uncle); Daniel Rose (uncle); Elihu Rose (uncle); Deborah Rose (sister); Adam R. Rose (brother); David S. Rose (cousin); Gideon Rose (cousin); Amy Rose Silverman (cousin)

Jonathan Frederick Phinneas Rose (born 1952) is an American urban planner and real estate developer. Through his corporation Jonathan Rose Companies, he is known for developing communities that are considered affordable and environmentally-responsible. Apart from his involvement in various aspects of property, Rose has founded Gramavision Records, a jazz and New Music label. Rose has written several books including The Well Tempered City: What Modern Science, Ancient Civilizations and Human Behavior Teach Us About the Future of Urban Life.

== Early life and education ==
Rose was born in New Rochelle, New York, the son of Sandra (née Priest) and Frederick P. Rose of Harrison, New York, a Jewish family; he was raised in Scarsdale, New York. His grandfather, Samuel B. Rose, and great-uncle, David Rose, founded the real estate development company Rose Associates in 1928 and built small apartment buildings in the Bronx and then in Manhattan in the 1930s. His father, Frederick P. Rose, who later served as the chairman of Rose Associates, expanded the company with his two brothers, Daniel and Elihu. Rose attended the Horace Mann School and graduated in 1974 from Yale University with a B.A. in Psychology and Philosophy. In 1980, he earned a Masters in Regional Planning from the University of Pennsylvania

== Career ==
After graduate school, Rose joined his family's real estate company, Rose Associates, in 1976 to learn the practice of development. In 1979-80, he developed the American Thread Building, a live/work residential community that included computers and a data bank in each unit. When New York City's Mayor Koch called for assistance in developing affordable housing, Rose Associates obtained development rights for the area around the Atlantic Terminal. Rose was named project developer. In 1984, Rose oversaw the design and approvals of the project, Atlantic Center, conceived of as a large scale green mixed-use, mixed-income communities, with moderate-income housing units to be built under the New York City Partnership New Homes program. Prior to the start of construction, the project was sold to Bruce Ratner's firm, Forest City/Ratner.

In 1979, Rose founded Gramavision Records, now a subsidiary of Rykodisc, producing over 75 jazz and new music recordings of artists including Taj Mahal, the Kronos Quartet, and John Scofield. In 1986, he became a founding board member for Jazz at Lincoln Center and was in charge of the design and construction of its home, the Frederick P. Rose Hall.

In 1989, he left Rose Associates and founded Jonathan Rose Companies, a national development, owners' representative and investment firm. The firm is a developer of green, affordable and mix-income housing, known for its Via Verde housing project in the South Bronx, a joint venture with Phipps Houses, and Highlands' Garden Village, a mixed use mixed income urban infill community in Denver, Colorado. The firm's planning work is focused on facilities for lower income families and addressing environmental issues. As project managers, the firm works with cities and not-for-profits on projects such as Signature Theater on 42nd St. in New York City, The Orchestra of St Luke's DiMenna Center for Classical Music, The Irish Arts Center, and the redevelopment of the New York University Polytechnic School of Engineering campus in Brooklyn.

The Jonathan Rose Companies’ Smart Growth Investment Fund was the country’s first real estate fund focused exclusively on acquiring and retrofitting green buildings. The firm now has six investment funds, four of which focus on affordable housing. In 2017, Rose's firm purchased Forest City's national federally subsidized affordable housing portfolio, as well as its affordable housing property management group and its FHA Mortgage operation.

== Publications ==
Rose is the author of The Well-Tempered City: What Modern Science, Ancient Civilizations, and Human Nature Teach Us About the Future of Urban Life, published by Harper Wave in September 2016. Rose proposes a methodology built on five qualities: coherence, circularity, resilience, community, and compassion. Siddhartha Mukherjee commented that "...this provocative, important, and majestically composed book about the future of cities should be essential reading for our times." The review in the Stanford Social Innovation Review found that the book "overlooks organic and spontaneous responses to urban issues" and offered limited practical advice. The book received a PROSE Award for 'Outstanding Scholarly Work by a Trade Publisher' in 2017.

== Honors ==
Rose was given the Visionary Leadership Award by the MIT Center for Real Estate in 2010.

In September 2014, Rose gave the Dunlop Lecture at Harvard's Joint Center for Housing Studies, titled "The Entwinement of Housing and Wellbeing." He became an honorary member of the American Institute of Architects (AIA) in 2014 is. He also held the Yale School of Architecture's Edward P Bass Distinguished Visiting Architectural Fellowship in 2015. Rose was awarded an Honorary Doctorate from The New School in 2015.

== Decorations ==
- Order of the Beloved Son of the Dragon (17 December 2023).

== Philanthropy ==
In 1977, Rose joined the board of The Educational Alliance, and served as the head of its real estate committee, overseeing the development of senior, homeless and affordable housing, drug treatment centers, and social services. In 1986, Rose joined Wynton Marsalis and a leadership group to form Jazz at Lincoln Center, of which he was chairman of the executive committee from 1996-2003, and oversaw the design and construction of its home, Frederick P. Rose Hall, named after his father. In 1992, Rose became the chairman of the board of the Greyston Foundation, a community development organization in Yonkers, New York, and lead its growth in the development of affordable housing, social services and job creation and training. In 1999, Rose and his father created the Frederick P. Rose Architectural Fellowship with Enterprise Community Partners, which placed emerging architects in community development organizations.

In 2002, Rose and his wife co-founded the Garrison Institute "to connect the wisdom of the contemplative traditions with social and environmental action." He sits on the boards of Enterprise Community Partners, the Brooklyn Academy of Music, and is an honorary board member of the Natural Resources Defense Council, the American Museum of Natural History, and Jazz at Lincoln Center. In 2007, he was named commission chair of the Green Ribbon Commission of the Metropolitan Transportation Authority. He was a member of New York governor Andrew Cuomo's NYS 2100 Commission formed in 2012 after Hurricane Sandy.

== Personal life ==
Rose is married to Diana Calthorpe Rose, sister of architect Peter Calthorpe. They have two daughters, Ariel Flores Zurofsky (born 1973 during Calthorpe's previous marriage), and artist Rachel Rose (born 1986). Rose describes himself as both Jewish and Buddhist stating "I think Buddhism has really advanced the science of the mind, and Judaism has advanced the process of generosity."

== Selected works ==
- Jonathan F.P. Rose (September 2016). The Well Tempered City: What Modern Science, Ancient Civilizations, and Human Nature Teach Us About the Future of Urban Life. Harper Collins Publishers.
- Moral Ground, Ethical Action for a Planet in Peril. Trinity University Press. 2010. - chapter "A Transformational Ecology"
- Biophilic Design; The Theory, Science and Practice of Bringing Buildings to Life. John Wiley & Sons Inc. 2008. - chapter "Green Urbanism: Developing Restorative Urban Biophilia"
- Jonathan F.P. Rose (2008). Green Communities. American Planning Association.
- Jonathan F.P. Rose (2008). How Can Conservation Help? Using Land Conservation to Address Other Economic and Social Issues. Yale University.
