= St Andrews Angels =

Scottish Sy Andrews university angel investment association

- University of St Andrews Alumni Angel Network
- Formation: 2013; 13 years ago
- Founders: St Andrews Alumni
- Type: Voluntary organisation
- Purpose: Provide investment for startups in Scotland
- Locations: London, United Kingdom; New York City, United States
- Region served: Scotland
- Services: Angel Investing, venture capital
- Main organ: Two independent boards, located in both London and New York
- Website: www.st-andrewsangels.com www.standrewsangels.co.uk

The St Andrews Angels, also known as the University of St Andrews Alumni Angel Network, is an angel investment network managed by alumni from the University of St Andrews in Scotland.

The network is led by a group of alumni entrepreneurs, financiers and faculty within the United States and United Kingdom who promote Scottish ventures and facilitate deal flow within its network, as well as provide investment capital, strategic advice and mentoring to early-stage ventures.

The St Andrews Angels is led by two independent boards, located in both London and New York, each composed of business executives, financiers and entrepreneurs. Each board performs deal discovery, whilst members independently facilitate any equity investments. The group seeks to promote Scottish ventures and technology outside of the country and supports events centred upon fostering greater linkages between London, New York & Scotland.

== History ==
The group was founded in 2013 by University of St Andrews students and alumni.

== Membership ==
Membership to the St Andrews Angels is open to all University of St Andrews alumni, faculty and affiliated individuals. Non-affiliated individuals may be permitted to join if sponsored by a current member. To join as an investor however, individuals must qualify as having accredited investor status under Regulation D of the Securities and Exchange Commission in the US. Investor membership in the UK requires certified high-net-worth individual status or self-certified sophisticated investor status as detailed by the Financial Conduct Authority. Investor members must participate in one investment annually.

== Education ==
The St Andrews Angels provides educational seminars, concerning entrepreneurship and the capital raising process, to students at the university. The group also organises regular opportunities for University students to attend pitch events in both St Andrews and further afield through their sister organisations and partners. The group also runs a series of lectures and keynote speeches centred around economics and entrepreneurship. Former notable speakers include David S. Rose.
