= Frederick P. Rose =

American businessman (1923–1999)

- Born: Frederick Phineas Rose; 1923
- Died: 1999 (aged 75); Rye, New York
- Education: B.S. Yale University
- Occupation: real estate developer
- Known for: Chairman of Rose Associates
- Spouse: Sandra Priest
- Children: Deborah Rose; Jonathan F. P. Rose; Samuel P. Rose; Adam R. Rose
- Parent(s): Belle Rose; Samuel B. Rose
- Family: David Rose (uncle); Daniel Rose (brother); Elihu Rose (brother); David S. Rose (nephew); Joseph B. Rose (nephew); Gideon Rose (nephew); Amy Rose Silverman (niece); Isabel Rose (niece); Rachel Rose (granddaughter)

Frederick Phineas Rose (1923–1999) was an American real estate developer, philanthropist, and member of the Rose family.

== Biography ==
Rose was born in Brooklyn to a Jewish family, one of three sons of Belle and Samuel B. Rose. He was raised in Mount Vernon, New York. His father and his uncle David Rose founded the real estate development company Rose Associates in 1923 and built small apartment buildings in the Bronx and then in Manhattan in the 1930s. He had two brothers, Daniel and Elihu. Rose graduated from Yale University in 1944 majored in civil engineering and then served as a lieutenant in the U.S. Navy Seabees during World War II After the war, he went to work for Rose Associates where he was responsible for design and construction while his brother Daniel was responsible for planning and finances; and his brother Elihu managed the family's apartment houses. The Rose family typically purchased properties with their own money, minimizing the use of debt thus enabling to better weather market downturns. In 1961, they built their first office development, the two-building, 1 million square-foot 280 Park Avenue. Long an opponent of rent control, in the 1990s Rose successfully converted more than 3,000 apartments in Manhattan into condominiums and co-ops. He eventually served as chairman of Rose Associates.

The Rose family was one of the most established and prominent real estate families in New York City in the 20th century (along with the Dursts, the Lefraks, the Rudins, and the Tisch family). In 2006, Rose Associates, managed over 31,000 apartments in New York City including Stuyvesant Town and Peter Cooper Village.

== Philanthropy ==
Rose was a prominent philanthropist whose lifetime donations totaled $95 million, including $5 million to the Metropolitan Museum of Art, $15 million to the New York Public Library, $18 million to Lincoln Center for the Performing Arts, and $20 million for the $150 million Frederick Phineas and Sandra Priest Rose Center for Earth and Space at the American Museum of Natural History.

Rose helped to create the Association of Yale Alumni and was the first chair of its Board of Governors from 1972 to 1974. He was a member of the University Council from 1976 to 1981 and served on the Yale Corporation as a Fellow from 1989 to 1994. In 1976, Rose received the Yale Medal for outstanding service to the university; in 1991, he received the Medal of Honor from the Yale Science and Engineering Society; and in 1988, Yale awarded him an honorary Doctor of Humane Letters degree. After his death in 1999, for Rose's support of good design and the spirit of public service, the Rose Architectural Fellowship was created in his honor.

== Personal life ==
In the 1940s, he married Sandra Priest whom he met when she was 19 and a student at Vassar College. She returned in mid-life to school and graduated with a B.A. from Manhattanville College and a M.A. in learning disabilities from The College of New Rochelle; she later taught junior high school students in the South Bronx. They had four children: Deborah Rose; Jonathan F. P. Rose, one of the largest developers of affordable and green housing in New York City; Samuel Priest Rose, a professor at the University of Colorado at Denver prior to his death in 1994; and Adam Raphael Rose, the former co-president (with cousin Amy Rose) of Rose Associates. His nephews and nieces include Gideon Rose (son of his brother Daniel), the editor of Foreign Affairs and a member of the Council on Foreign Relations; David S. Rose (also son of Daniel), author of the New York Times best selling books "Angel Investing" and "The Startup Checklist"; and Isabel Rose (daughter of his brother Elihu), author of the 2005 novel The J.A.P. Chronicles which she also adapted into an Off Broadway musical. His granddaughter is artist Rachel Rose. His funeral was held at the Westchester Reform Temple in Scarsdale, New York.
