= Suzanne Klahr =

American social entrepreneur and educator

Suzanne McKechnie Klahr is an American social entrepreneur and educator.

She has served as a lecturer at Stanford Law School and Harvard Law School. She is currently an adjunct professor at Northwestern Pritzker School of Law. She is the recipient of a Jefferson Award. She was elected as lifetime member of Ashoka in 2006.

She is the founder of BUILD, a nonprofit organization, that works for underprivileged high-school students.

== Biography ==
Klahr was born in London, England and raised in New York City and is a dual citizen of the United States and Great Britain. She earned her undergraduate degree from Brown University and later attended Stanford Law School, where she graduated with a Juris Doctor (JD) and was a member of the Stanford Law Review.

Her early interest in social entrepreneurship was influenced by her family, particularly her mother, who taught in Harlem. Her grandmother, who earned a degree in gerontology in her 60s and founded a nonprofit, also played a role in shaping Klahr’s work. Growing up in Manhattan, Klahr started small businesses, including a children's newspaper called Little Apples for Young New Yorkers in elementary school. As a teenager, she ran a jewelry business called Beaudangles by Suzanne.

At Riverdale Country School, Klahr developed an interest in human rights, founding a school chapter of Amnesty International. She continued to explore social work as an undergraduate at Brown University, where she interned with the Lawyers Committee for Human Rights. After completing her degree in 1994, Klahr joined the law firm Mintz, Levin, Cohn, Ferris, Glovsky, and Popeo, PC, in Boston, where she observed the firm’s community engagement efforts.

In 1999, Klahr graduated from Stanford Law School, where she served as president of the Public Interest Law Students Association and volunteered with the East Palo Alto Community Law Project.

Through a Skadden Fellowship, she launched BUILD, aiming to give students hands-on business experience as a pathway to graduation and college readiness. BUILD has since expanded to cities including Boston, Washington D.C., Los Angeles, Pittsburgh, and New York City.

Klahr has lectured on social entrepreneurship at Stanford, Harvard, and Northwestern Law School, and her course on the subject was the first offered at a U.S. law school. She is currently CEO of Mayacamas Partners, a coaching and consulting firm, and a member of the International Coaching Federation.

== Personal life ==
She is married to Joshua Klahr with whom she has two children. Klahr is a member of the Young President's Organization (YPO) and has served as a forum moderator.

== Awards ==
- In 2007, she was honored with a Jefferson Award for Public Services.
- In 2008, Suzanne was elected to the San Mateo County Women's Hall of Fame.
- In 2009, she was named one of Silicon Valley's Most Influential Women by the Silicon Valley/San Jose Business Times.
- In 2011, she was awarded as the KQED Local Hero for Women's History Month.
