= Keystone Building =

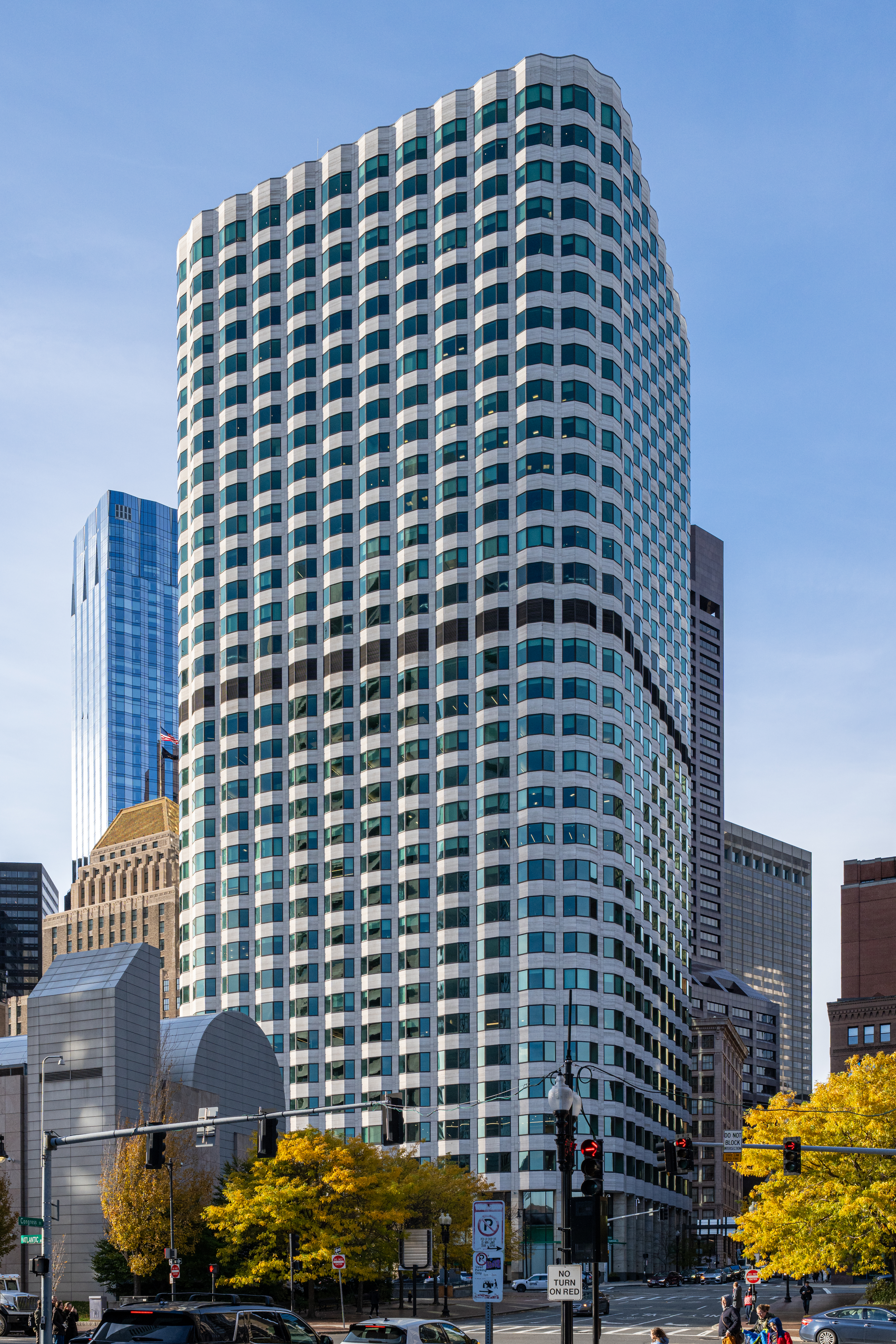
- Interactive map of the Keystone Building area

General information
- Type: Office
- Location: 99 High Street, Boston, Massachusetts
- Coordinates: 42°21′15″N 71°03′17″W
- Completed: 1971

Height
- Roof: 400 ft (120 m)

Technical details
- Floor count: 32

Design and construction
- Architect: Pietro Belluschi with Emery Roth & Sons
- Developer: Daniel Rose (for Rose Associates)

Website
- http://99highboston.com/

99 High Street, previously known as the Keystone Building, is a high-rise office building located in downtown Boston, Massachusetts. The building stands at 400 feet (122 m) with 32 floors. Construction began in 1969 and was completed in 1971. In height, it is tied with Harbor Towers I as the 36th-tallest building in Boston. The building was the first development in Boston of the New York–based real estate firm Rose Associates, led by Daniel Rose, who went on to develop One Financial Center and Boston Wharf. The original owners were Rose Associates (New York), Central & District Properties (London), and anchor tenant Keystone Custodial Funds. The building is currently owned by TIAA-CREF.

The Keystone Building was developed as the flagship headquarters for Keystone (which was subsequently acquired and rebranded by Wells Fargo). To that end, Rose engaged architect Pietro Belluschi, a leader of the Modern Movement in architecture, to design the building's notable exterior, featuring distinctive rounded corners and grooved façade. Belluschi worked with the architectural firm of Emery Roth & Sons, who developed the construction drawings and interiors.

== Gallery ==
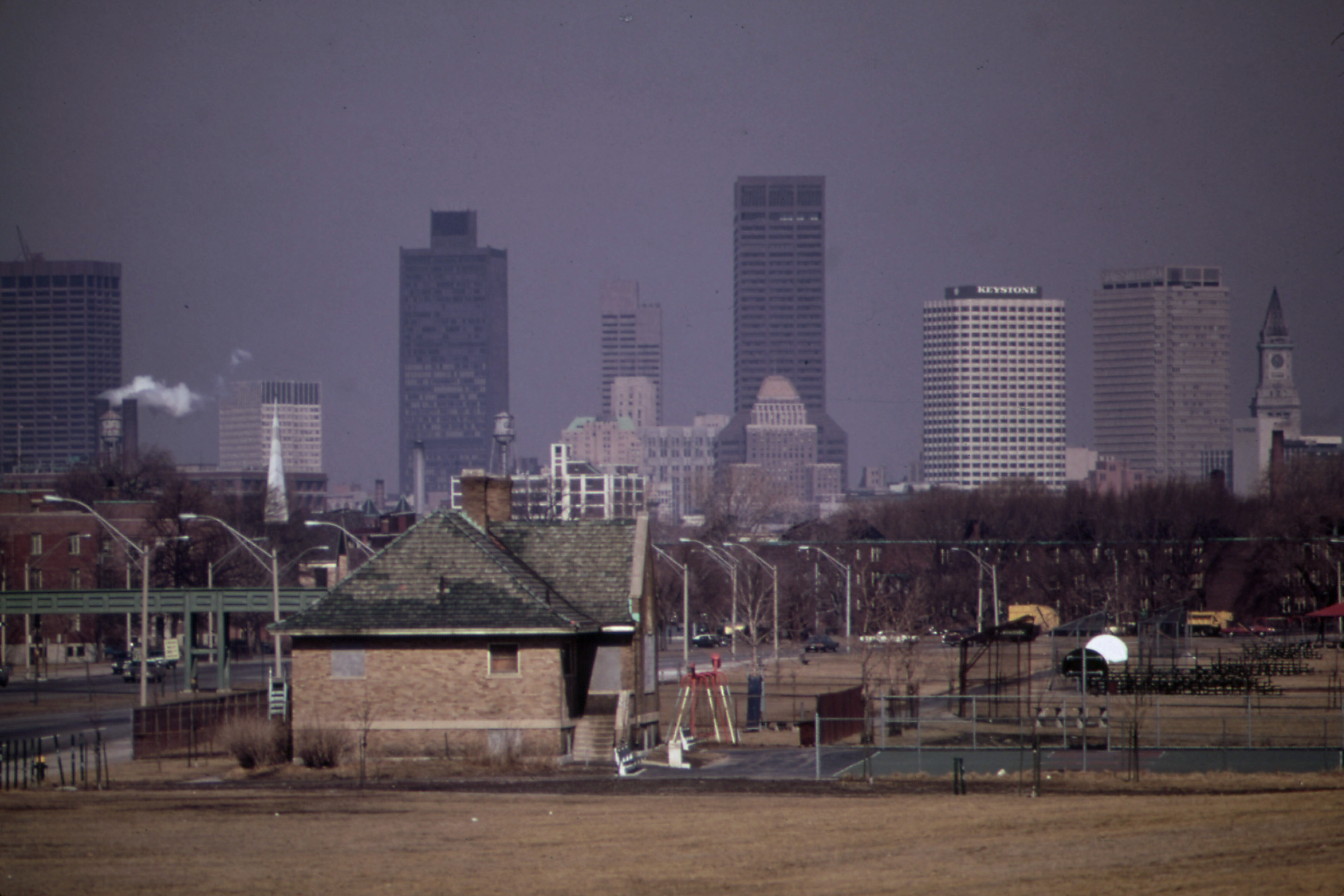
1973

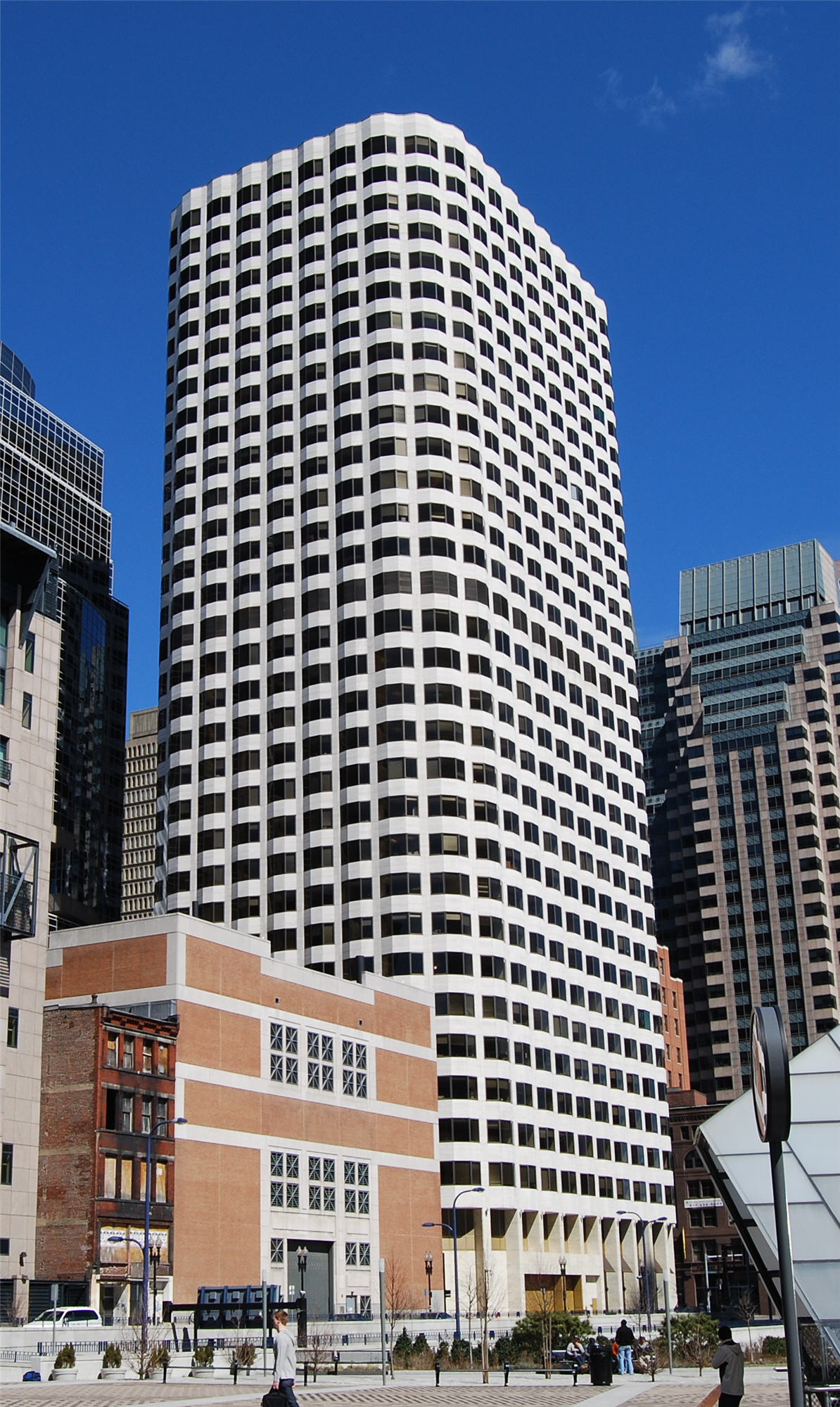
1999

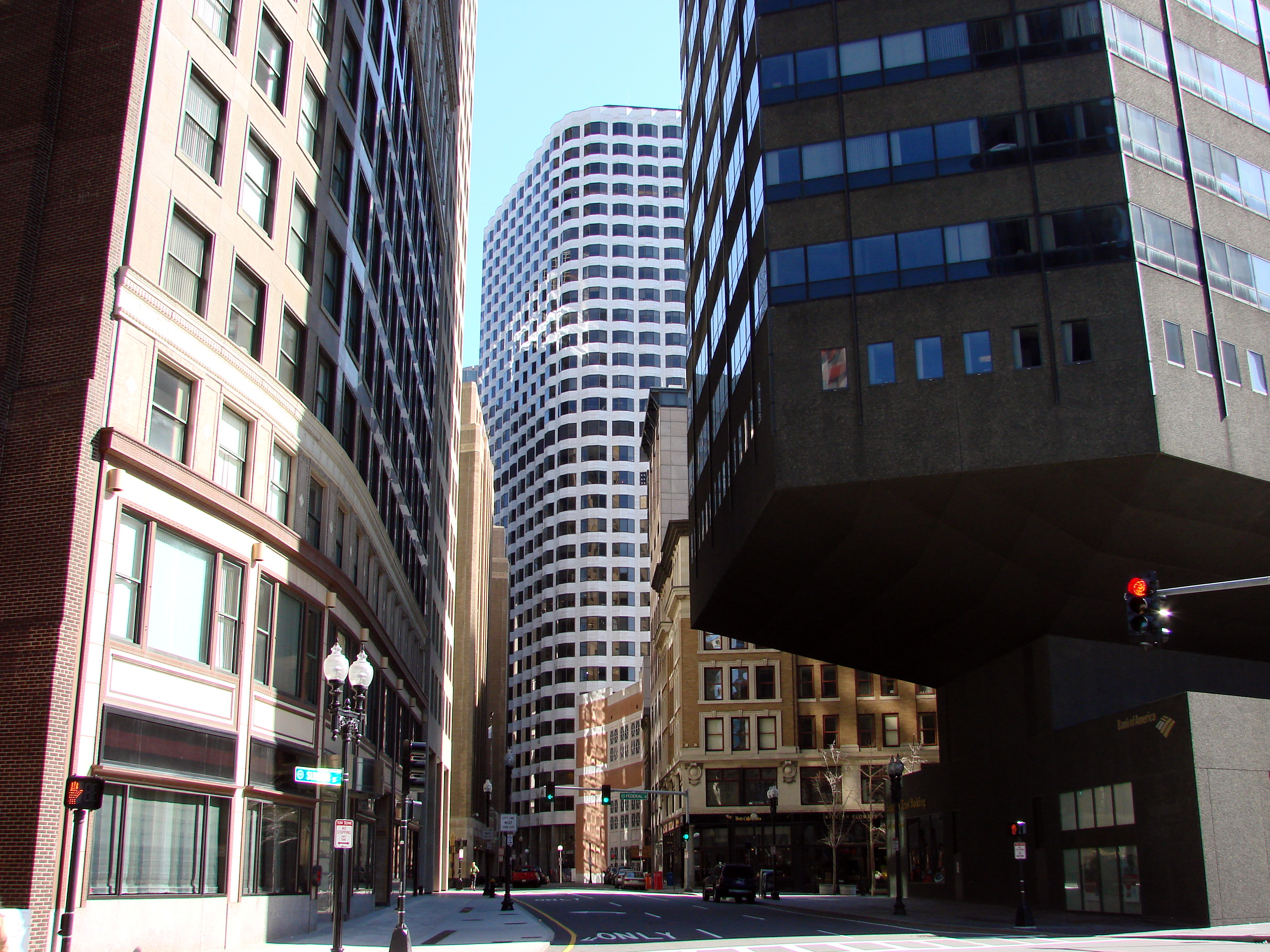
2008

== See also ==
- List of tallest buildings in Boston
