= Amy Rose Silverman =

American philanthropist

- Born: 1966 (age 59–60)
- Education: B.S. University of Michigan
- Occupation: real estate developer
- Known for: CEO, President, and co-owner of Rose Associates
- Spouse: Jeffrey Lee Silverman
- Children: David Evan, Samantha Belle and Julie Elizabeth
- Parent(s): Susan Wechsler Rose; Elihu Rose
- Family: Frederick P. Rose (uncle); Daniel Rose (uncle); David S. Rose (cousin); Gideon Rose (cousin); Jonathan F. P. Rose (cousin); Adam R. Rose

Amy Rose Silverman (born 1966) is an American real estate developer and philanthropist who serves as President and CEO of Rose Associates.

== Biography ==
Rose was born to a Jewish family in 1966, one of three daughters of Susan (née Wechsler) and Elihu Rose. She has two sisters, Isabel Rose Fagen (b. 1968), and Abigail Rose Blum (b. 1970). After graduating with a B.S. from the University of Michigan, she joined the family real estate development company, Rose Associates where she served as Vice President. She later became Executive Senior Managing Director and in 2008, Co-President along with her cousin Adam R. Rose. As Co-President, she focused on the firm's strategic positioning and business development. In 2013, Rose Associates was one of the largest real estate management companies in New York with over 26,000 apartments. and 220 employees. In June 2017, she presided over the sale of Rose Associates' cooperative and condominium management division (with 8,250 units in 35 buildings in New York) to Terra Holdings. In December 2017, she was named CEO and sole president. After the sale, Rose Associates has $2.4 billion in projects in development and manages $15 billion in assets including 14,000 rental units throughout New York City.

== Philanthropy and board associations ==
Rose serves on the Young Presidents' Organization, The Real Estate Round Table, the Urban Land Institute, the International Council of Shopping Centers, the Young Men's/Women's Real Estate Association of New York, the Real Estate Board of New York, the Women's Forum Inc., WX, New York Women in Real Estate, the Dean's Advisory Council of Literature, Science and Arts at the University of Michigan, and on the board of directors of the Jewish Museum. Since 2013, she has endowed the Rose Silverman Internship Fellowship at the University of Michigan; the fellowship provides funding for International Studies students so that they might participate in international internships.

== Personal life ==
In 1995, she married Jeffrey Lee Silverman. She had three kids; David Evan, Samantha Belle and Julie Elizabeth. Her sister, Isabel Rose, is the author of the 2005 novel The J.A.P. Chronicles which she also adapted into an Off Broadway musical. She funded the 2011 documentary film Miss Representation, which explores how mainstream media contribute to the under-representation of women in influential positions by circulating limited and often disparaging portrayals of women.
