= Rachel Rose (artist) =

American visual artist (born 1986)

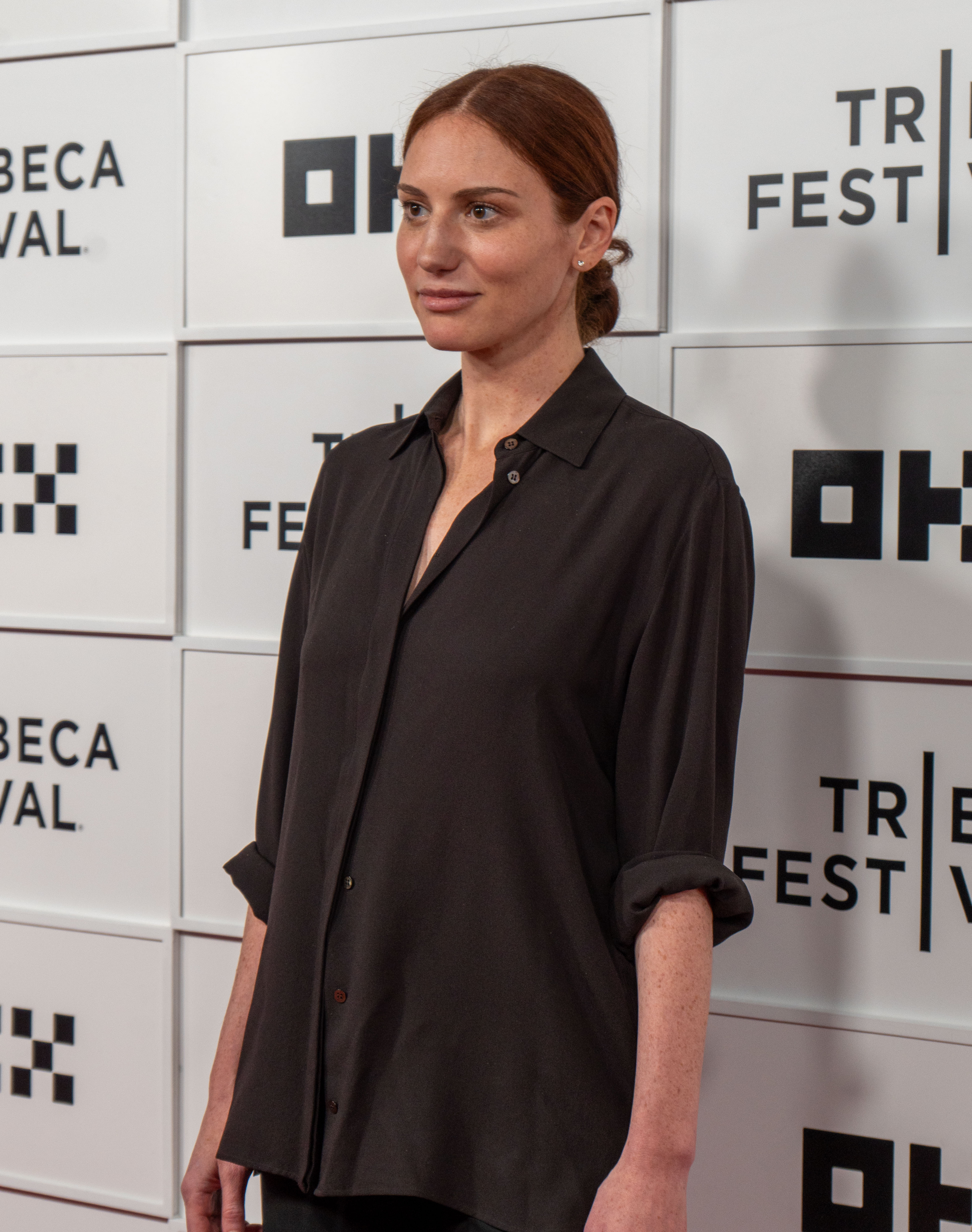
- Rose in 2026
- Born: 1986 (age 39–40)
- Education: B.A. Yale University; M.A. The Courtauld Institute of Art; M.F.A. Columbia University.
- Occupation: Artist
- Known for: Video installations
- Spouse: Ian Cheng
- Parent(s): Diana Calthorpe Rose; Jonathan F. P. Rose
- Family: Peter Calthorpe (uncle); Frederick P. Rose (grandfather)

Rachel Rose (born 1986) is an American visual artist known for her video installations. Her work explores how our changing relationship to landscape has shaped storytelling and belief systems. She draws from, and contributes to, a long history of cinematic innovation, and through her subjects—whether investigating cryogenics, 17th century agrarian England, the American Revolutionary War, modernist architecture, or the sensory experience of walking in outer space—she questions what it is that makes us human and the ways we seek to alter and escape that designation.

Among her recent projects are Enclosure (2019), jointly commissioned by the Park Avenue Armory in New York and LUMA Foundation in Arles, Wil-o-Wisp (2018), jointly commissioned and owned by the Philadelphia Museum of Art and Fondazione Sandretto Re Rebaudengo; Everything and More (2015), presented at the Whitney Museum of American Art, New York; and Palisades (2015), at the Serpentine Galleries in London in 2014. Rose is the recipient of the 2015 Frieze Artist Award.

== Early life and education ==
Rose is the daughter of Jonathan F. P. Rose, an urban planner with a focus on sustainable housing. Her uncle is the architect Peter Calthorpe. She started her education by earning a B.A. in humanities and B.A. art from Yale University and a M.F.A. from Columbia University. She entered graduate school as a painter, and quickly shifted, she studied under Rirkrit Tiravanija.

== Works ==
Rose produces video installations juxtaposing images and sounds. Her experiential pieces work to convey sensorial aspects of ideas by manipulating sound and image. Her imagery depicts "humanity's shard current anxieties, and their multi-layered interconnectivity" as well as humanities' relationship to the natural world, advancing technology, mortality, and history.

In Sitting Feeding Sleeping (2013), Rose combines footage of zoo animals in captivity with images of a robotics perception lab, and a cryonics lab that flash. Rose explores the limbo between alive and dead, and compares survival to artificial means of conserving life. Rose’s own voice is included in the voice-over, where she reflects on the subject matter. Rose uses a collage editing style of filmed and found footage with distorting images and audios.

Rose's short film, A Minute Ago (2014) explores the concept of "a moment" through artistic practice, examining how we experience, process, communicate, and reconstruct a single point in time. Featuring live performances by art practitioners and moving image works from the Zabludowicz Collection, the exhibition delves into the ways various art forms can interrogate the nature of a moment. The moving image works in A Minute Ago take diverse approaches to capturing, reinterpreting, and sharing individual moments, exploring the emotional impact of fleeting experiences. Complementing these are commissioned performances that challenge the idea of liveness, investigate the interplay between performance and moving image, and disrupt the linear perception of time. The exhibition layers different temporalities to emphasize the relationship between the artist, viewer, and performer, raising questions about how experiences are shared and who defines their boundaries. By combining these works, the exhibition creates a dynamic live experience that evolves in real-time. With artworks that shift over time, A Minute Ago becomes its own moment, continually changing for each new visitor as performances unfold. From one-time events to six-week-long performances, the space transforms into a series of shifting moments, emphasizing the impermanence of liveness and the challenge of capturing a fleeting experience.

Everything and More (2015) explores mortality through an astronaut's experience of his body within outer space. Rose filmed at a neutral buoyancy lab, where astronauts learn how to space walk, and she filmed liquids from her kitchen on a glass plate. Rose through this work thinks through how the astronaut experience is similar to that of death. “In outer space we are faced with nothing and when we die or are about to die maybe we’re also thinking about nothing.” In the video, Rose portrays how the everyday allows us to access the sublime.

Lake Valley (2016) is a cel-animated video set in a fictional suburban world. Each frame is a mix of elements from 19th- and 20th-century children's book illustrations, carefully cut, layered, and reinterpreted for the modern era. The suburban spaces depicted—homes, parking lots, parks—are both familiar and strange. The video merges past and present, with unexpected transformations: a plastic garbage bag is reimagined as a woman's hair, and an eggshell becomes a combination of dragon scales, cobblestones, and beer. The narrative follows an imagined pet searching for attention on a lonely day. The pet leaves its family and heads to the nearby green area in search of connection. The story touches on the theme of abandonment, a common element in children's literature, illustrating how abandonment, like life in suburbia, is an ordinary yet constant experience shaped by daily routines and anxieties.

Wil-o-Wisp (2018) traces the life of Elspeth Blake, a mystic and healer, through a period of profound change in 17th-century rural England. The story begins in 1570, with Elspeth portrayed as a wife and mother. When her daughter, Celestina, slips out of the house one night, the seemingly small act sets off a chain of serious consequences. By 1603, Elspeth had transformed into a mystic, practicing healing through transference—channeling energy between living beings. Her work, however, draws suspicion. After being observed by a local man and reported to the authorities, she is taken away to face judgment. Told through a sequence of painterly scenes, the film unfolds in a time when nature was believed to be animated with spiritual force, and magic was a lived reality. At the same time, the enclosure movement—the privatization of common lands—was beginning to reshape both the physical landscape and the structure of society, paving the way for industrialization. Wil-o-Wisp is the first in a series of films by Rachel Rose that explores this era of deep economic, ecological, and spiritual disruption. On the floor, three optical lenses placed on the carpet refract the projected film, referencing the alchemical and magical associations of visual distortion during that time—when lenses and optical tools were believed to possess prophetic or transformative powers. Behind the screen, Rose introduces The Chemical Wedding, a new sculptural piece inspired by the allegorical tale of the same name, which encoded secret alchemical knowledge in its narrative and landscapes.

In Enclosure (2019), Rose looks back at 17th century agrarian England at a moment when the land was being reshaped. The film focuses on the mass privatization of the land during the Enclosure Act. Until then, under the principles of the 1217 Charter of the Forest, people had communal access to land. But beginning in the 16th century, as industrialization advanced, the crown, clergy, and wealthy landowners began dividing and claiming these shared lands, initiating what became known as the Enclosure movement. This transformation, as historian E. P. Thompson famously described, amounted to a systemic "robbery" of the working class, resulting in widespread displacement, environmental degradation, and a dramatic shift in social structure. During this time, trees were burned and people were displaced, it was “an environmental and social catastrophe.” Enclosure follows a group of displaced people that swindles peasants out of their land as the Enclosure Act was setting boundaries for communal farmland.

Borns (2019) is a series of sculptures pairing hand-blown glass with mineral forms that resemble cracked eggs or embryonic forms. These works are made from the same base material—sand—in different states and temporalities: molten glass, which forms instantly, and rock, which evolves over millennia. The meeting of these materials captures moments of suspended transformation, evoking biological, geological, and mystical themes.

Signs (2020) is a series of moving images that returns to Rose’s fascination with invented landscapes. She captures animals in their habitats, then digitally alters the footage to create surreal, otherworldly environments. These works blur boundaries between living and nonliving, imagined and real, exploring the eerie in-between states of existence. Spanning early and new works, the exhibition invites viewers to reflect on the delicate yet powerful force of life itself.

The Loop (2022) sculptures are crafted entirely from silica in two forms: raw mineral and glass. While rock forms slowly over millennia, it can be ground into sand, which—when rapidly heated and shaped—transforms into glass. Rose brings these opposing temporal states together, juxtaposing the natural and the man-made in an uncanny, layered union.

Colores (2022) draw inspiration from 18th-century pastoral landscapes by artists such as Gainsborough, Palmer, and Constable. Rose reinterprets these romanticised scenes through experimental techniques using pigments and metallic powders. She manipulates the materials’ drying times, densities, and gravitational behavior to create subtle yet profound shifts in texture and form—revealing the strange, energetic qualities embedded in these landscapes before industrialization.

The Last Day (2023), a video shows thousands of photographs shot in Rose’s children's bedroom. The video is broken up into seven days, and each day depicts a different epoch in the history of the earth. The film is about charts the epic of the Earth's history through the objects in a child's bedroom. For each day, she lit the still lifes gradually, from sunrise to nightfall. Each arrangement—ranging from a milk bottle to a collection of toy trucks—represents a distinct era in Earth's history. For example, a milk bottle evokes the formless, pre-vegetation world; a rubber bathtub toy represents marine life; and toy trucks symbolize the era of late industrialization. On the seventh and final day, Rose introduced a radar-sensor carpet that responds to human presence by emitting light—serving as a central figure and ominous signal of an impending end. The work shows the history of the human landscape from the prehistoric to the industrial, mirroring the child's development of their imagination.

== Exhibitions ==
Recent solo exhibitions include Science Gallery London (2024); GL STRAND (2023); LUMA Arles (2023); SITE Santa Fe (2023); Gladstone Gallery Seoul (2023); Cc Strombeek (2022); Pond Society (2020); Lafayette Anticipations (2020); Fridericianum (2019); LUMA Foundation (2019); Fondazione Sandretto (2018); Philadelphia Museum of Art (2018); Kunsthaus Bregenz (2017); Museu Serralves (2016); The Aspen Art Museum (2016); The Whitney Museum of American Art (2016) and Serpentine Galleries (2015). In addition to these and other solo exhibitions, the artist's work has been featured in the 2018 Carnegie International, the 2017 Venice Biennale, the 2016 São Paulo Biennial, and numerous other group exhibitions.

== Awards ==
Rose won the illy Present Future Prize at Artissima 2014 and the Frieze Artist Award in 2015 for site-specific installations by emerging artists at the London fair.
