= Peter Calthorpe =

American architect

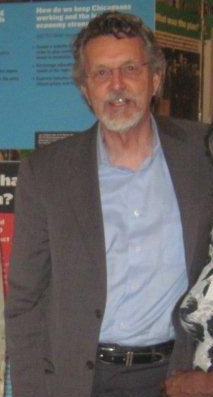
- Calthorpe in 2011
- Born: 1949 (age 76–77)
- Education: B.A. Antioch College, Yale School of Architecture
- Spouse: Jean Driscoll
- Children: 3
- Family: Diana Calthorpe (sister); Jonathan F. P. Rose (brother-in-law); Rachel Rose (niece)

Peter Calthorpe (born 1949) is a San Francisco–based architect, urban designer and urban planner. He is a founding member of the Congress for New Urbanism, a Chicago-based advocacy group formed in 1992 that promotes sustainable building practices. For his works on redefining the models of urban and suburban growth in America, Calthorpe has been named one of twenty-five ‘innovators on the cutting edge’ by Newsweek magazine.

== Career ==
In 1986, he, along with Sim Van der Ryn, published Sustainable Communities. In the early 1990s, he developed the concept of Transit Oriented Development (TOD) highlighted in The Next American Metropolis: Ecology, Community, and the American Dream.

In 1989, he proposed the Pedestrian Pocket, an up to 110 acres (45 ha) pedestrian-friendly, transit-linked, mixed-use urban area with a park at its centre. The Pedestrian Pocket mixes low-rise, high-density housing, commercial and retail uses. The concept had several similarities with Ebenezer Howard's Garden City and aimed to be an alternative to low-density residential suburban developments.

As an expert on urban planning, Peter Calthorpe, is frequently cited in various reputable mass media including New York Times, The Guardian, National Geographic, Newsweek, Grist, Metropolismag, The Advocate and others.

In 2006, Calthorpe won the ULI J.C. Nichols Prize for Visionaries in Urban Development.

In his 2017 TED Talk, Calthorpe addressed the necessity of efficient use of space and resources in the context of climate change and identified urban sprawl an urgent trend that requires immediate attention.

In 2018, Calthorpe launched urban-planning software UrbanFootprint that should help fight sprawl allowing non-experts to model the impacts of different urban planning scenarios.

Among the most recent Calthorpe concerns are autonomous cars as a potential reason for increased urban congestion and suburban sprawl. Unlike the advocates of self-driving cars who believe that they will lead to fewer cars and faster commutes, Calthorpe believes that the convenience of autonomous transport will only encourage more car trips. He suggests an alternative plan to avoid congestion – autonomous rapid transit – fleets of self-driving vans in reserved lanes on main arteries.

== Early life and family ==
Calthorpe was born in London and raised in Palo Alto, California.

He is married to Jean Driscoll. He has three children: Lucia, Jacob, and Asa.

His sister Diana Calthorpe is married to real estate developer Jonathan F. P. Rose. His niece is artist Rachel Rose.

== Writings ==
- Calthorpe, Peter and Sim Van der Ryn (1986). Sustainable Communities: A New Design Synthesis for Cities, Suburbs and Towns. San Francisco: Sierra Club Books. ISBN 0-87156-629-X
- Calthorpe, Peter: The Pedestrian pocket, in Doug, Kelbaugh (ed.) Pedestrian Pocket Book, 1989
- Calthorpe, Peter: The Next American Metropolis: Ecology, Community, and the American Dream, Princeton Architectural Press, 1993
- Calthorpe, Peter and Fulton, William: The Regional City, Island Press, 2001
- Calthorpe, Peter: Urbanism in the Age of Climate Change, Island Press, 2010
