= Elihu Rose =

American real estate developer, academic, and philanthropist

- Born: March 30, 1933 (age 92); New York
- Education: B.A. Yale University; Ph.D. New York University
- Occupations: real estate developer, professor
- Known for: Rose Associates; Military historian
- Spouse: Susan Wechsler
- Children: Amy Rose Silverman; Isabel Rose Fagen; Abigail Rose Blum
- Parent(s): Belle Rose; Samuel B. Rose
- Family: David Rose (uncle); Frederick P. Rose (brother); Daniel Rose (brother)
- Website: http://elihurose.org

Elihu Rose (born March 30, 1933) is an American real estate developer, academic, and philanthropist.

== Biography ==
Rose was born to a Jewish family in Brooklyn, NY, one of three sons of Belle and Samuel B. Rose. He has two brothers, Daniel Rose and Frederick P. Rose. He attended the Horace Mann School. After graduating from Yale University in 1954, he served in the U.S. Air Force; and in 1956, he joined the family real estate development company, Rose Associates, as a partner. In 1978, he graduated from New York University with a Ph.D. in International Relations and started a teaching military history in addition to his real estate activities. He has lectured at Yale University, Columbia University, the University of Maryland, the U.S. Military Academy at West Point, and the U.S. Naval Academy at Annapolis. He is presently an Adjunct Associate Professor at New York University.

In 2002, he received The Outstanding Teaching Award from New York University. He serves as Vice Chairman of the Park Avenue Armory and is the former chairman of the Board of the International Center of Photography. He serves on the boards of WNET, the Lincoln Center Theater, The Library of America, and the advisory board of the National Museum of American History; and is a Fellow of the American Academy of Arts and Sciences. In 1993 he received the Superior Public Service Medal from the U.S. Navy and in 2004 the Outstanding Civilian Service Medal from the U.S. Army.

In 1988, he and his wife founded the Susan and Elihu Rose Foundation. In 1991, they funded the Rose Museum at Carnegie Hall; and donated $7.1 million in 2013 and $2.7 million in 2012 to the Park Avenue Armory. They have been staunch supporters of the Jewish Museum, the Gilder Lehrman Institute of American History, the New York Historical Society, the New York-Presbyterian Fund, the NYU Urology Research Program, the Horace Mann School, Rockefeller University, New York University, the Juilliard School, the Harlem Educational Activities Fund, United Way of New York, The Doe Fund (dedicated to helping the homeless men achieve independence and self-sufficiency), and the UJA-Federation of New York.

Rose serves on the advisory board of the Gotham Center for New York City History.

== Personal life ==
In 1962, he married Susan Wechsler. They live in Manhattan and have three daughters: Amy Rose Silverman (b. 1966), Isabel Rose Fagen (b. 1968), and Abigail Rose Blum (b. 1970). His daughter Amy is co-president of Rose Associates. His daughter, Isabel Rose, is the author of the 2005 novel The J.A.P. Chronicles which she also adapted into an Off Broadway musical.
