= David Rose (real estate developer) =

American real estate developer and philanthropist

- Born: 1892; Jerusalem
- Died: 1986 (aged 93–94)
- Occupation: real estate developer
- Known for: co-founder of Rose Associates
- Family: Samuel B. Rose (brother); Frederick P. Rose (nephew); Daniel Rose (nephew); Jonathan F. P. Rose (great-nephew); David S. Rose (great-nephew); Gideon Rose (great-nephew)

David Rose (1892–1986) was an American real estate developer and philanthropist who co-founded Rose Associates.

== Biography ==
Rose was born to a Jewish family in Jerusalem one of six siblings. His family immigrated in the 1890s and he then worked as a sales catalog buyer for a clothing store working in the Garment District in New York City when - inspired by an uncle who purchased real estate - he founded Roses Associates with his brother, Samuel B., in 1927. In 1928, they completed their first building, a six-story, 218-unit building and within two years had completed more than 900 apartments. In 1930, they built the 500-unit Academy Apartments in the Bronx, the first apartment building built of reinforced concrete. After the Depression, they began building apartments in Manhattan. One of his most prominent buildings was the Bankers Trust Company at 280 Park Avenue at 48th Street.

The Rose family went on to become one of the most established and prominent real estate families in New York City in the 20th century (along with the Dursts, the Lefraks, the Rudins, and the Tisch family). In 2006, Rose Associates, managed over 31,000 apartments in New York City including Stuyvesant Town and Peter Cooper Village.

== Philanthropy ==
Rose was dedicated to supporting the development of new medical devices. He financed the design and construction of the first hyperbaric chamber in New York City at Mount Sinai Hospital. He established the Foundation for Medical Technology, which finances medical instrumentation research; and he funded Dr. Willem Kolff in the development of the first production portable, artificial kidney. Rose also contributed to the building of Hadassah Hospital in Jerusalem and the Salk Institute for Biological Studies in La Jolla, California. He also served as a trustee of the New School for Social Research and of the Bronx YM-YWHA.
