= Alexander Garvin =

American urban planner (1941–2021)

- Born: March 8, 1941; New York City, New York, U.S.
- Died: December 17, 2021 (aged 80)
- Education: Yale College; Yale School of Architecture
- Occupations: Urban Planner, Educator, Author
- Website: AGA Public Realm Strategists

Alexander Garvin (March 8, 1941 – December 17, 2021) was an American urban planner, educator, and author, who served in the administrations of five New York City mayors and trained many prominent planners during a 55 year teaching career at Yale University. At the time of his death, he was in private practice at AGA Public Realm Strategists in New York City and was also an adjunct professor at the Yale School of Architecture.

Garvin served in a variety of planning, housing, and development positions in New York City government including Director of Comprehensive Planning. He is also widely known for having created the vision plan of Atlanta's proposed greenbelt park system, the Atlanta Beltline; serving as planning director for New York City's 2012 Olympic Games bid; and overseeing efforts to redevelop lower Manhattan after the September 11th attacks as Vice President of Planning, Design, and Development for the Lower Manhattan Development Corporation. In 1996, Garvin published The American City: What Works, What Doesn’t, the most significant of his several books on urban planning. Through its third edition, published in 2013, The American City became a popular textbook among students of the field.

== Professional career ==
=== Early career and New York City government ===
Following his graduation from the Yale School of Architecture, Garvin began his career working as an architect at a number of firms including the firm of Philip Johnson and John Burgee. Soon after in 1970, however, he moved into public service, serving initially as Director of Housing and Community Development for the New York City Department of City Planning, where he arranged financing for projects such as the West Village Houses and was instrumental in the development of the neighborhood preservation program. He was then appointed Deputy Commissioner of the city's Housing & Development Administration (HDA), where he was responsible for initiating the Participation Loan Program, and, most notably, for extending the J-51 Tax Exemption and Abatement Program to apply to the city's entire stock of multiple dwellings.

Later during the Koch administration, he served as the city's Director of Comprehensive Planning, and during the Giuliani administration was appointed as a member of the New York City Planning Commission. Garvin also spent fifteen years as a private developer of residential real estate between 1980 and 1995.

=== NYC2012 and LMDC ===
After reading The American City in 1996, Daniel Doctoroff hired Garvin as managing director of planning and design for NYC2012, New York City's bid for the 2012 Summer Olympics. Garvin's plan for the games became known as the “Olympic X,” which consisted of two axes—a north-south axis along the East River and an east-west axis along the Long Island Rail Road—which would have come together in Long Island City, the site of the Olympic Village. The plan would have provided an impetus for the redevelopment of western Queens, revamped the city's transportation infrastructure, and created new housing, public spaces, and sports facilities in Manhattan, Brooklyn, Queens, Staten Island, and the Bronx. While International Olympic Committee ultimately rejected New York City's bid for the games in favor of London's, planners continue to draw inspiration from Garvin's plan as they pursue initiatives such as the Hudson Yards Redevelopment Project at the site of the proposed “Olympic Square,” the 7 Subway Extension, and parks along the East River in Brooklyn and Queens such as Brooklyn Bridge Park.

When Doctoroff became deputy mayor for economic development during the Bloomberg Administration, Garvin joined the Lower Manhattan Development Corporation (LMDC), which was responsible for planning the rebuilding of Lower Manhattan, including the World Trade Center site, following the September 11th Attacks. There, he served as vice-president of planning, design, and development until May 2003.

=== The Atlanta Beltline ===
Following his work at the LMDC, Garvin founded AGA Public Realm Strategists (formerly known as Alex Garvin and Associates), a strategic consulting firm “that specializes in the development of the public realm—a city’s streets and squares, sidewalks and buildings, waterfront and parks.”

In 2004, the firm was hired by the Trust for Public Land to prepare a study of the state of public space, recreation, transportation, and economic development along the fringes of Atlanta, Georgia. The result of the study was the master plan for the Atlanta Beltline, a network of green spaces and parks along a loop of rights-of-way of freight railroad corridors that encircle Atlanta. The 22-mile loop would connect the city's 46 neighborhoods and 13 new and renovated “jewels” (public parks, squares, and plazas). The Beltline would begin as a public greenway and paved trail for jogging, cycling, and walking and later incorporate a light rail transit system, supported by increased tax revenue from private development spurred by the trail. In 2005, the Beltline Partnership was formed to administer the project. The first portions of the Beltline opened to the public in 2008.

== Academic career ==
Garvin was a member of the Yale faculty for more than five decades, teaching at his alma mater from 1967 until his death in 2021. His best-known course, the Yale College offering "Introduction to the Study of the City," ran every year from its introduction in 1967 and became one of the longest-running courses in the university's catalog. He began it in the fall of 1967 as a seminar for Trumbull College that drew twelve students; by the early 2000s it regularly enrolled more than a hundred. The course occupied an unusual administrative position, belonging to no academic department and funded through the office of the Dean of Yale College, to whom Garvin reported directly. He later extended his teaching to the Yale School of Architecture and the Yale School of Management.

The course was built around elaborate term-long role-playing games of Garvin's own design, in which students worked through a realistic development scenario—such as building a suburban shopping center, carrying out an urban-redevelopment project, or converting a disused industrial district to new uses. Participants were assigned roles as developers, architects, public officials, retailers, bankers, or residents opposing a project, and spent weeks negotiating toward credible proposals. One recurring exercise, "New Haven Mall Wars," set rival development teams against one another for control of a New Haven site, drawing on actual mall proposals in the city. Garvin supplemented the simulations with walking tours and frequently invited practitioners—often former students—to address the class and take leading roles in the games.

Underlying the course was the pragmatic philosophy that ran through Garvin's writing and practice: that successful urban planning consists of "public action that will produce a sustained and widespread private market reaction." He stressed firsthand observation over abstract theory, urging students to withhold judgment on a place until they had visited it, and he emphasized the collaborative, interdisciplinary character of planning, in which developers, officials, financiers, lawyers, and community groups all shaped outcomes. The approach informed several of his books, which grew directly out of the course, among them The American City: What Works and What Doesn't (1996) and The Planning Game (2013).

Garvin's students included a number of figures who went on to prominent planning careers, among them Joseph B. Rose, chairman of the New York City Planning Commission under Mayor Rudolph Giuliani; Con Howe, planning director of Los Angeles; and Hunter Morrison, planning director of Cleveland. Howe, reflecting on Garvin's long tenure as an adjunct, called him "Yale's longest serving temporary professor." The Yale School of Architecture credited him with shaping the training of successive generations of planners, architects, and developers, and in 2022 it convened a symposium, "What Works: The Planning and Development Legacy of Alexander Garvin," at which former students and colleagues from journalism, planning, architecture, academia, and government discussed his influence.

== Other activities ==
As part of his private practice, Garvin created a number of master plans including those of Hinton Park, Tennessee; DeKalb County, Georgia; and Tessera, a planned community on Lake Travis outside Austin, Texas; among others. He also served on the boards of directors for several professional organizations including the Forum for Urban Design, the Ed Bacon Foundation, the Trust for Public Land, and the Society for American City and Regional Planning History. From 1996 to 2004, he was also a national fellow at the Urban Land Institute. In addition, he administered architectural design competitions for a number of prominent projects including the rebuilt World Trade Center, the 2012 NYC Olympic Village, the Domino Sugar Refinery in Williamsburg, Brooklyn, and Shelby Farms Park in Tennessee.

== Personal life ==
Garvin was born in New York City on March 8, 1941, to Jacques and Margarita (Volpe) Garvin. His parents were born in Russia. In 1962, he received a Bachelor of Arts degree in Architecture from Yale College and later both a Masters in Architecture and a Masters in Urban Studies from the Yale School of Architecture in 1967. Garvin was a member of the Yale Russian Chorus in its early years, contributing substantially during trips to Russia in the late 1950s because of drawing skills, and his knowledge of and enthusiasm for American abstract art. He resided in New York City on Manhattan's Upper East Side, where he lived for most of his life.

Garvin died on December 17, 2021, at the age of 80.
