= Harbor Towers =

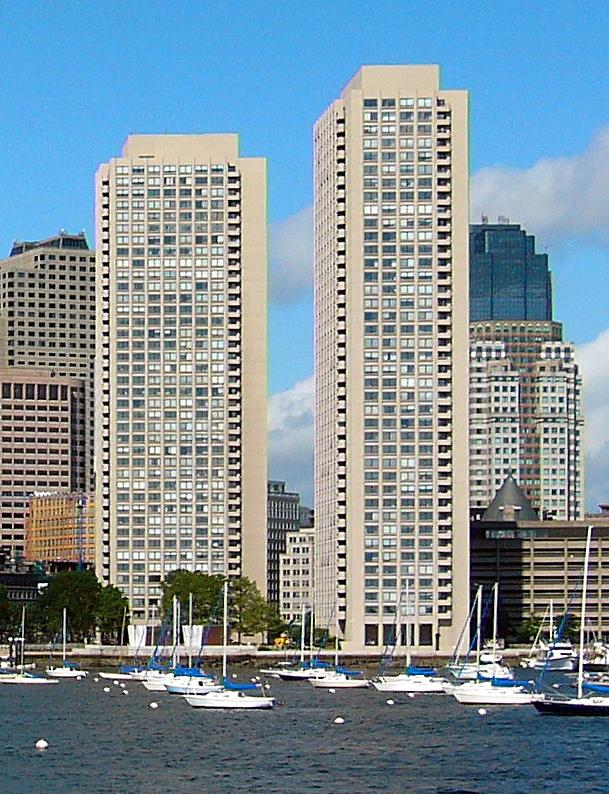
- A view of the Harbor Towers from Boston Harbor
- Interactive map of the Harbor Towers area

General information
- Type: Residential
- Architectural style: Brutalist
- Location: East India Row, Boston, Massachusetts
- Coordinates: 42°21′28.64″N 71°02′59.89″W
- Completed: 1971

Height
- Roof: 400.0 ft (121.9 m) / 396 ft (121 m)

Technical details
- Structural system: Reinforced concrete
- Floor count: 40

Design and construction
- Architect: I.M. Pei & Partners

The Harbor Towers are two 40-story residential towers located on the waterfront of Boston, Massachusetts, in between the New England Aquarium and the Rowes Wharf mixed-use development. Harbor Towers I, the taller of the two towers, stands at 400 ft (121.9 m), while Harbor Towers II rises 396 ft (120.7 m). Harbor Towers I is tied for the 36th-tallest building in Boston with the Keystone Building, while Harbor Towers II is tied for the 38th-tallest building in Boston with One Devonshire Place. They were designed by Henry N. Cobb of I. M. Pei & Partners.

The towers were built in 1971 as part of a major revitalization project of Boston's dilapidated waterfront area. The apartments, initially designed as affordable rental housing, were converted into condominiums in the 1980's.

== History ==
=== Development and construction ===
The Harbor Towers apartment complex was completed in 1971. It is located near Boston's financial district and developed by the Berenson Corporation. The towers were designed by Henry N. Cobb, who also designed Boston's John Hancock Tower and collaborated with I.M Pei on Boston's City Hall Plaza. In 2006, they were the city's tallest residential towers. The towers were planned by the Boston Redevelopment Authority (BRA) to revitalize Boston's waterfront.

Originally planned as three 40-story towers, only two were built alongside a parking garage.

=== Condominium conversion ===
As the growth of the city moved toward the waterfront, the development's location drew attention during the condominium conversion craze of the early 1980s. In 1981, both apartment towers started a two-year process of conversion to over 600 condominiums, with incentives for existing renters to purchase at discounted prices. Many early apartment renters now own several units, often combined to create wrap-around units with as much as 5,000 square feet (460 m^{2}) of living space. As of 2025, units range from $700,000 to $3 million.

=== Renovations ===
Over the decades, the towers have undergone major renovations, including complete window replacement in the 1990s following a 70-window fall incident caused by Hurricane Gloria in 1985. Due to their severe corrosion, the towers' HVAC pipes were replaced in 2010, and in 2014, the towers' lobby and hallways were renovated.

In April 2025, a $20 million project was undertaken to bolster the towers' ground floor coastal defenses to protect the structure from sea level rise. The project was triggered by two nor'easters in 2018 which caused widespread flooding. It is expected to last for 12 months.

== Architecture ==
The apartments are organized in a pinwheel fashion around a central core and are made of cast in place reinforced concrete. The concrete exterior balconies have a giant zipper-like appearance against the flat façade.

The stainless steel sculpture at the base of the buildings is Untitled Landscape by David von Schlegell, created in 1964. The artwork is often mistaken for solar panels.

== Criticism ==
The residential complex appears to have been generally poorly received by the public. Boston Magazine described the building as "grim 40 stories of concrete and glass". The architect himself, Henry Cobb, wrote in an email to the magazine: "I do not regard Harbor Towers as my best effort in Boston. I am sympathetic to those who believe that in the perspective of history this could be seen as the wrong project in the wrong place at the wrong time."

== Gallery ==
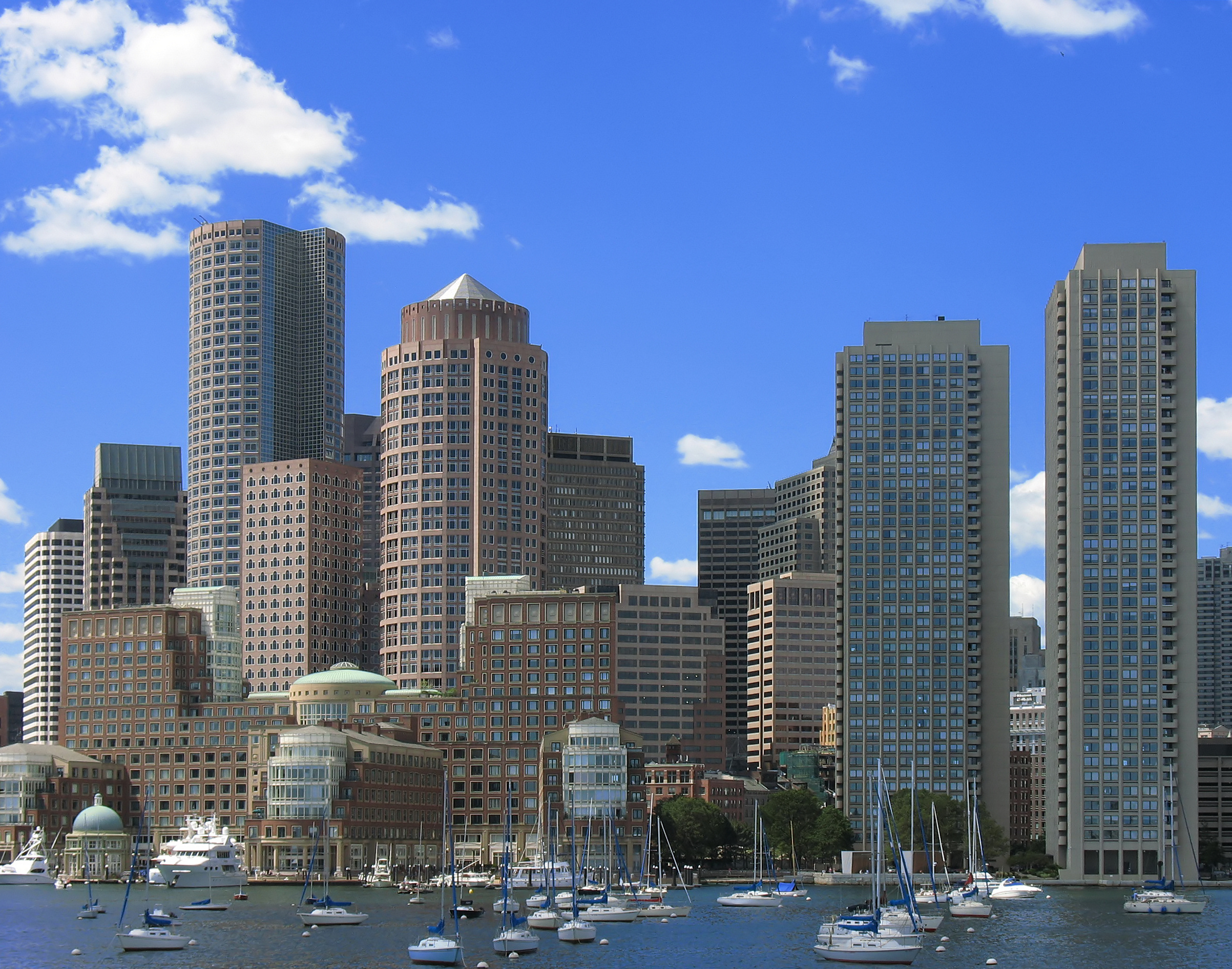
The Harbor Towers (far right) in the Boston skyline when viewed from Boston Harbor.

== See also ==
- List of tallest buildings in Boston
