= Mintz, Levin, Cohn, Ferris, Glovsky, and Popeo =

American multinational law firm

Mintz, Levin, Cohn, Ferris, Glovsky and Popeo, PC
- Headquarters: One Financial Center; Boston, Massachusetts
- No. of offices: 8
- No. of attorneys: approximately 600
- No. of employees: approximately 1000
- Major practice areas: General Practice
- Revenue: $400 million USD (2018)
- Date founded: 1933
- Founder: Haskell Cohn and Benjamin Levin
- Company type: Professional corporation
- Website: mintz.com

Mintz, Levin, Cohn, Ferris, Glovsky and Popeo, P.C. (commonly referred to as "Mintz Levin" or simply "Mintz") is an American multinational general practice, full service law firm employing approximately 600 attorneys worldwide. Its headquarters are located at One Financial Center in the Financial District of Boston. The firm also has offices in Los Angeles, New York City, Miami, San Diego, San Francisco, Washington D.C., and Toronto. It was founded in 1933 by Haskell Cohn and Benjamin Levin. Robert I. Bodian has served as the firm's managing member since 2009.

== History ==
Mintz Levin was founded in 1933, in the midst of the great depression, by Benjamin Levin and Haskell Cohn, who first met as classmates at Harvard Law School. The firm began practicing under the name Mintz, Levin and Cohn after Herman Mintz became a legal collaborator in 1937, and then a partner in 1939. The firm grew steadily, adding additional partners starting with William M. Glovsky in 1965. In 1968, Robert Popeo became the first attorney to join as a partner. In 1979, the firm began expanding, opening a secondary office in Washington, D.C., headed by Charles D. Ferris, former Chairman of the Federal Communications Commission (FCC).

In the 1970s and 1980s, Mintz Levin was considered a politically connected firm that benefitted from representing Massachusetts in bond issuances. Francis X. Meaney, a longtime partner of the firm (and later managing partner from 1984 to 1990) led the firm's bond issuance business, and had previously served as a campaign coordinator to Governor Michael Dukakis. The brother of name partner Robert Popeo also worked in the state Treasury office for longtime Massachusetts Treasurer Robert Q. Crane.

After 2000, the firm expanded further, with Mintz Levin opening offices in California, and in London, which it closed in 2015, as well as expanding its U.S. client services to Israeli companies. In 2006, Mintz Levin acquired Reed Intellectual Proerty law Group in Palo Alto to help establish a West Coast presence, and was the first acquisition in the firm's then-73 year history.

The firm opened its first office outside of the U.S. in Toronto, Canada in March 2023.

In November 2023, amid a wave of antisemitic incidents at elite U.S. law schools, Mintz, Levin, Cohn, Ferris, Glovsky, and Popeo was among a group of major law firms who sent a letter to top law school deans warning them that an escalation in incidents targeting Jewish students would have corporate hiring consequences. The letter said "We look to you to ensure your students who hope to join our firms after graduation are prepared to be an active part of workplace communities that have zero tolerance policies for any form of discrimination or harassment, much less the kind that has been taking place on some law school campuses."

== Recognition ==
Best Lawyers and U.S. News & World Report ranked Mintz Levin in its first annual Best Law Firms list. In 2010, the American Bar Association awarded the firm its Pro Bono Publico Award for its efforts in securing passage of legislation in Massachusetts to allow victims of sexual assault, stalking, and harassment to obtain criminally enforceable protection. The firm has received a perfect score on the Human Rights Campaign Foundation's Corporate Equality Index for four consecutive years starting in 2008. Yale Law Women named Mintz Levin one of the nation's Top-Ten Family Friendly Firms. There are 43 Mintz Levin attorneys included in The Best Lawyers in America, 2012 Edition, and 34 Mintz Levin attorneys listed in the 2011 edition of Chambers USA.

In November 2025, Mintz's Intellectual Property Practice was recognized among the most active and best performing law firms in Patexia’s 2025 ITC Intelligence Report, which covers ITC Section 337 investigations conducted between 2019 and 2024. Mintz was listed as the No. 7 most active firm representing complainants, and several Mintz attorneys were individually ranked among the 100 most active or best performing attorneys representing complainants.

== Pro bono ==
Mintz Levin's attorneys represent a wide variety of nonprofit organizations and devote pro bono hours in the service of many different causes—such as human rights, civil rights, natural disaster legal assistance. In 1989, the firm established a Domestic Violence Project, which has since become its signature pro bono initiative. Hundreds of individual domestic violence and sexual assault victims have received representation through this program, which was expanded to include assisting with state and national legislative initiatives, drafting appellate and amicus efforts, and representing coalitions and related nonprofits. The firm also contributes staff time to community service on behalf of, and makes significant monetary donations to, a number of domestic violence and sexual assault causes.
