= Joanna Semel Rose =

American philanthropist, collector and art patron (1930–2021)

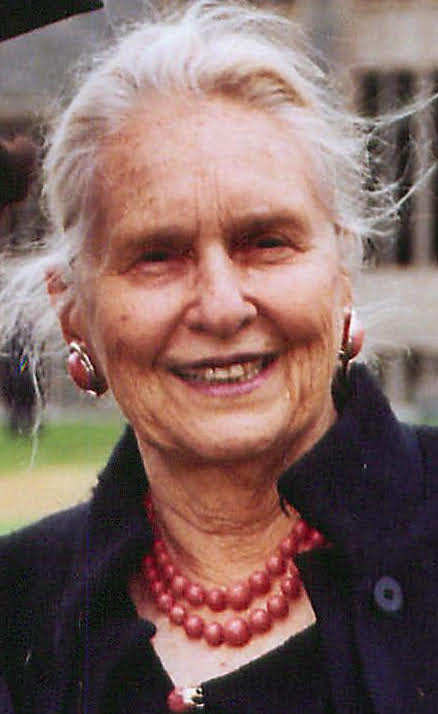
- Born: Joanna Semel; November 22, 1930; Orange, New Jersey, US
- Died: November 13, 2021 (aged 90); New York City, US
- Education: Bryn Mawr College; St Hilda's College, Oxford
- Occupations: Collector, arts patron, philanthropist
- Spouse: Daniel Rose (m. 1956)
- Children: 4, including David S. Rose and Gideon Rose
- Parent(s): Philip E. Semel; Lillian Mindlin

Joanna Semel Rose (November 22, 1930 – November 13, 2021) was an American arts patron, collector, publisher, philanthropist and connector. For several decades she was chairman of the board of the literary and political quarterly Partisan Review, and as a salonnière she drew writers, artists, academics and diplomats to the dinners and salons she held at her New York home. She became known to a wider public through Infinite Variety: Three Centuries of Red and White Quilts, a 2011 exhibition of 651 early American patchwork quilts from her collection, mounted at the Park Avenue Armory in honor of her 80th birthday.

== Early life and education ==
Joanna Semel was born on November 22, 1930, in Orange, New Jersey, to Philip Ephraim Semel, an attorney, and the former Lillian Mindlin, and grew up in Cedarhurst, New York. Her mother was one of five Mindlin sisters, daughters of Max and Celia (Socolof) Mindlin of East Orange, New Jersey; through them Rose was a first cousin of the E Street Band drummer Max Weinberg. Her father was a brother of the Zionist activist and philanthropist Bernard Semel, a founder of the Yiddish daily Der Tog and of the Jewish Education Association. Her mother's family also included Harry Socoloff, the Brooklyn food executive who, as an angel investor, backed Michael J. Cullen in opening King Kullen in 1930, recognized by the Smithsonian Institution as the first modern American supermarket. She was noted from an early age for a prodigious memory and intellectual ability. As a teenager she appeared on the radio program Quiz Kids and was a guest editor of Mademoiselle. At Lawrence High School she was editor in chief of both the school newspaper and its literary magazine, and graduated as class president and valedictorian in 1948.

She was also valedictorian of her class at Bryn Mawr College, from which she graduated summa cum laude in 1952, and continued her studies as a Bryn Mawr European Fellow at St Hilda's College, Oxford, and at the Shakespeare Institute in Stratford-upon-Avon. She later credited the Institute of International Education with her first grant, awarded in 1951.

Rose worked as an assistant to the director Joseph L. Mankiewicz on his 1954 film The Barefoot Contessa, starring Humphrey Bogart and Ava Gardner, appearing on screen as a bathing beauty and playing chess with Bogart between takes. Returning to New York, she worked as a Broadway producer at the Theatre Guild.

== Marriage and family ==
She married the real estate developer Daniel Rose on September 16, 1956. The couple maintained homes in Manhattan and East Hampton, with the latter being the landmarked 1905 Shingle Style house designed by Joseph Greenleaf Thorp at the corner of Ocean Avenue and Lily Pond Lane.

Their four children are the entrepreneur and investor David S. Rose; Joseph B. Rose, who served eight years as chairman of the New York City Planning Commission; the historian and author Emily Rose; and Gideon Rose, the former editor of Foreign Affairs. She was survived by her husband, her four children, eleven grandchildren and her brother, Daniel M. Semel.

== Partisan Review and public service ==
Rose joined the publications and advisory board of Partisan Review as its secretary in 1969, was elected co-chair of the board in 1975 and became sole chair in 1977, a position she held until the magazine ceased publication in 2003.

She was elected to membership in the American Academy of Arts and Sciences in 2012, and was an honorary fellow of St Hilda's College and a Distinguished Friend of the University of Oxford. She was an associate fellow of Berkeley College at Yale University and, with her husband, a co-founder of the Harlem Educational Activities Fund, which prepares students from Harlem and Washington Heights for selective colleges and universities.

Rose served on the boards of the New York Council for the Humanities, the New York Institute for the Humanities at New York University, the advisory board of the CUNY Graduate Center for the Humanities, and the national advisory board of the W. E. B. Du Bois Institute at Harvard University. She was a founding board member of Poets & Writers, the National Dance Institute, the Paper Bag Players and Bay Street Theater in Sag Harbor, and was founding chair of the American Friends of St Hilda's, the US charity supporting the college, which she helped establish in January 1989. She served on the boards of the British Institute, the Project for Public Spaces and Guild Hall in East Hampton.

In East Hampton she sat on the board of the Ladies Village Improvement Society, supported the Jewish Center of the Hamptons and the East Hampton Library, and was active in preservation efforts for Main Beach.

== Collections ==
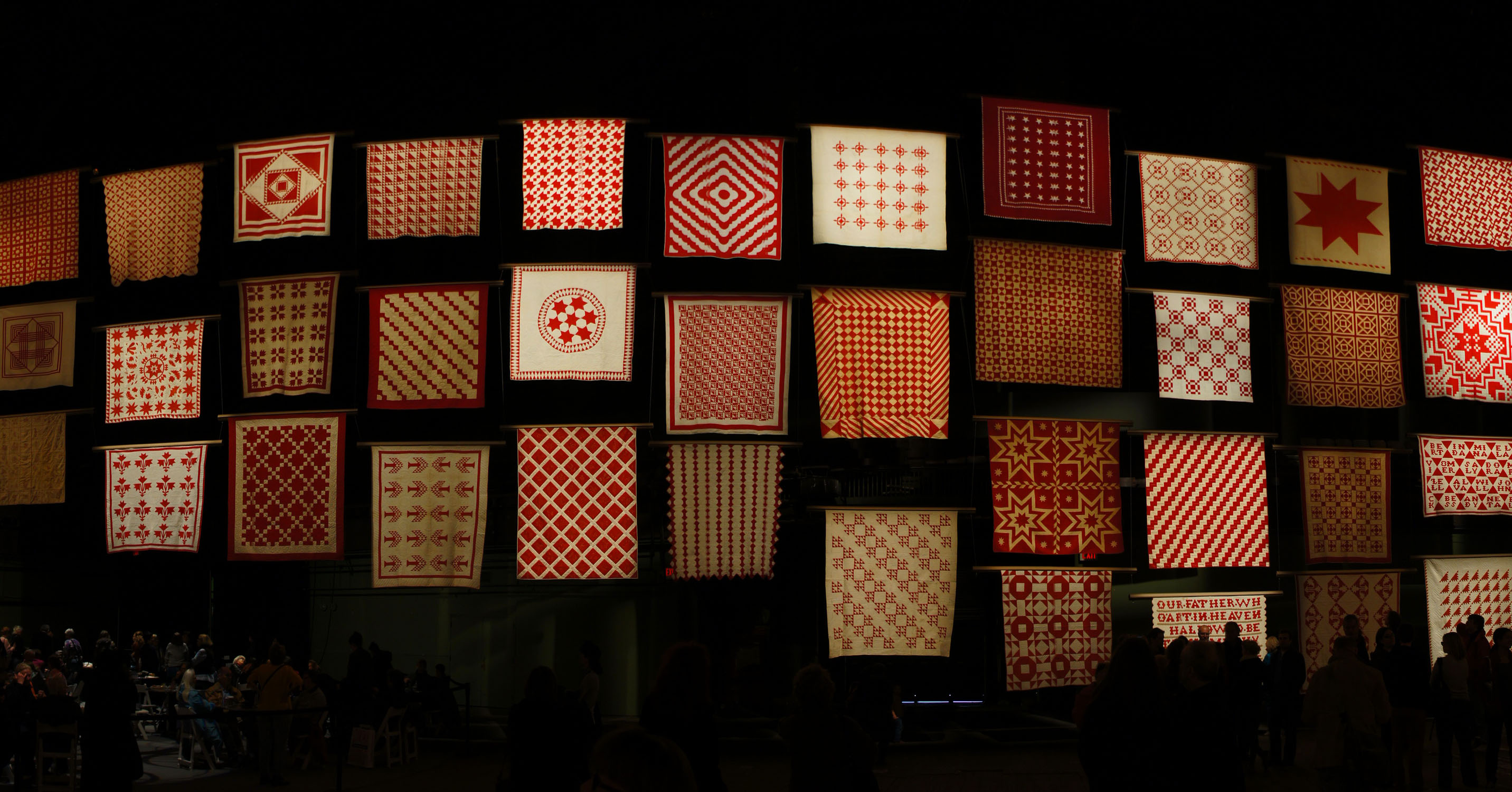
Infinite Variety: Three Centuries of Red and White Quilts at the Park Avenue Armory, 2011

Rose described herself to The New York Times as not a collector but a "treasure hunter". Over her lifetime she assembled collections across a wide range of subjects, including Judaica, Pre-Columbian art, oriental rugs, American Realist paintings, Chinese opera gowns, Judith Leiber minaudières, Christian Lacroix couture, antique scrimshaw, ammonite fossils, and some 200 place settings of Tiffany Olympian silver. The ammonites, mostly Early Cretaceous specimens from Madagascar, Morocco, Germany and Alberta, were bequeathed to St Hilda's College, Oxford, which displays them; ammonites, known in folklore as "snake stones" after a legend concerning St Hilda, appear in the college's crest. Her cookbook collection was among the largest in the United States. It numbered more than 4,000 volumes, nearly all of which her family gave to the Museum of Food and Drink, where they are held as the Joanna S. Rose Cookbook Collection; the titles range from the early 18th century to the present and span mainstream, obscure and marginalized culinary traditions. The rare wine collection she assembled with her husband was the subject of a short film, A Love Story: Dan & Joanna Rose ... and Wine, in which friends including Fareed Zakaria, Neil deGrasse Tyson and André Soltner appeared. The wine collection was sold at auction in March 2022. Her East Hampton rose garden held dozens of varieties, among them the 'Daniel Rose', a hybrid she commissioned and named in honor of her husband.

She also assembled what the auction house Doyle described as one of the largest privately held collections of Louis Vuitton luggage. According to the family, it began on the Roses' 1956 honeymoon voyage to Sicily, when they noticed stevedores handling one set of bags with unusual care and were told the reason was that the trunks were Vuitton. The collection was sold at Doyle in June 2022.

=== Red and white quilts ===
Rose began buying quilts in the 1950s at flea markets and antique shops, and did not know how many she owned until they were photographed for the exhibition, having guessed the total at about seventy. In 2011 her husband marked her 80th birthday by arranging for 651 red and white quilts from the collection to be shown as Infinite Variety: Three Centuries of Red and White Quilts, coordinated by the American Folk Art Museum, curated by Elizabeth V. Warren with the museum's senior curator Stacy C. Hollander as project director, and installed by Thinc Design in the Park Avenue Armory's 55,000-square-foot Wade Thompson Drill Hall from March 25 to 30. Her family arranged a donation so that admission would be free throughout the run; Rose had told her husband she wanted two things for her birthday, something she had never seen before and a gift for New York City. Rose proposed the title herself, taking it from a line in Shakespeare's Antony and Cleopatra on a beauty that age cannot wither. It was the largest quilt exhibition ever mounted in New York City and drew roughly 25,000 visitors, many travelling from outside the United States. The installation received a Core77 Design Award in 2012.

The collection was documented in Red & White Quilts: Infinite Variety (Skira Rizzoli, 2015) by Elizabeth V. Warren with Maggi Gordon, with an essay by Rose and a foreword by Martha Stewart; Vogue described it as a "perfect coffee-table topper" spanning three centuries.

Rose gave the quilts and the Infinite Variety exhibition rights to the International Quilt Museum in Lincoln, Nebraska, in honor of her and her husband's 63rd wedding anniversary. She and her family oversaw their transfer from her home in 2021, shortly before her death, and the collection went on view at the museum in 2022.

== Arts patronage ==
Rose commissioned and supervised the production of several modern works of illuminated Judaica by the artist Barbara Wolff and gave them to the Morgan Library & Museum. You Renew the Face of the Earth: Psalm 104 and the Rose Haggadah were given in 2014 and were the subject of the Morgan's 2015 exhibition Hebrew Illumination for Our Time: The Art of Barbara Wolff; the Joanna S. Rose Illuminated Book of Ruth, made in 2015–17, followed in 2018. A manuscript of the Song of Songs, begun in 2019 and still in production at her death, was given to the Morgan by her family in 2022. Other works she commissioned included paintings of East Hampton and artists' bindings for books by authors of her acquaintance.

With other members of the Rose family she commissioned artists to illustrate the family's annual Seder books; three volumes of the Rose Family Seder Books were presented to the New York Public Library's Dorot Jewish Division in 2005.

== Philanthropy ==
Rose supported the rehearsal studio of the Chamber Music Society of Lincoln Center, the Rose Center for Earth and Space at the American Museum of Natural History, Bryn Mawr College and the Trilling Seminars at Columbia University, and for many decades gave anonymous help to research and scholars in the humanities, including the Institute of International Education's Scholar Rescue Fund.

In 2012 she and her husband endowed the Henry Louis Gates Jr. Lectures in the African American Studies Department at Yale University, established as a 60th-birthday gift for their friend Henry Louis Gates Jr.; the inaugural lecture was delivered that October by Kwame Anthony Appiah.

Through the couple's charitable foundation, Rose funded production of the first episode of the television series Cosmos: A Spacetime Odyssey, which the astrophysicist Neil deGrasse Tyson had brought to them, with any financial returns designated for the American Museum of Natural History. The completed episode was subsequently used to secure a commitment from Fox for the balance of the series.

In 1981 Rose was one of 102 talent scouts recruited as the first nominators for the John D. and Catherine T. MacArthur Foundation's newly created MacArthur Fellows Program, listed under her Partisan Review affiliation with writing and art as her area of expertise. Nominators served fixed terms under a pledge of secrecy, and their identities were among the most closely guarded in American philanthropy until The New York Times Magazine obtained and published the original roster in 1992.

== Entertaining ==
Rose's parties on behalf of the New York Public Library, the New York Council for the Humanities, the Eldridge Street Synagogue and other charitable institutions became widely known, bringing together university presidents, diplomats, writers and artists. Events carried titles such as "The Feast of the Pheasant" and "Talleyrand Entertains Metternich at the Congress of Vienna". For "A Night of 100 Dinners," a 1983 Friends of the New York Public Library benefit staged simultaneously at some ninety-five private homes and other venues, which raised more than $200,000, the Roses hosted a dinner on the theme of Edward VII. Records documenting more than forty years of her entertaining, from 1976 to 2019, are held by the American Jewish Historical Society as the Joanna Semel Rose Hostess and Event Collection.

== Recognition ==
Rose was inducted as a fellow of the American Academy of Arts and Sciences in 2012, together with her husband. She was honored, with her husband, with the Mayor's Award of Honor for Arts and Culture from the City of New York and the Joseph Papp Racial Harmony Award from the Foundation for Ethnic Understanding. The main-belt asteroid 70712 Danieljoanna, discovered by the Catalina Sky Survey in 1999, is named in the couple's honor; 70718 HEAF is named for the Harlem Educational Activities Fund they founded.

Books dedicated to Rose and her husband include George Steiner's In Bluebeard's Castle, Henry Louis Gates Jr.'s Life Upon These Shores, Geoffrey Hartman's Scars of the Spirit, Fareed Zakaria's Ten Lessons for a Post-Pandemic World and David S. Rose's The Startup Checklist.

== Death ==
Rose died at her home in Manhattan on November 13, 2021, at the age of 90.
