= One Financial Center =

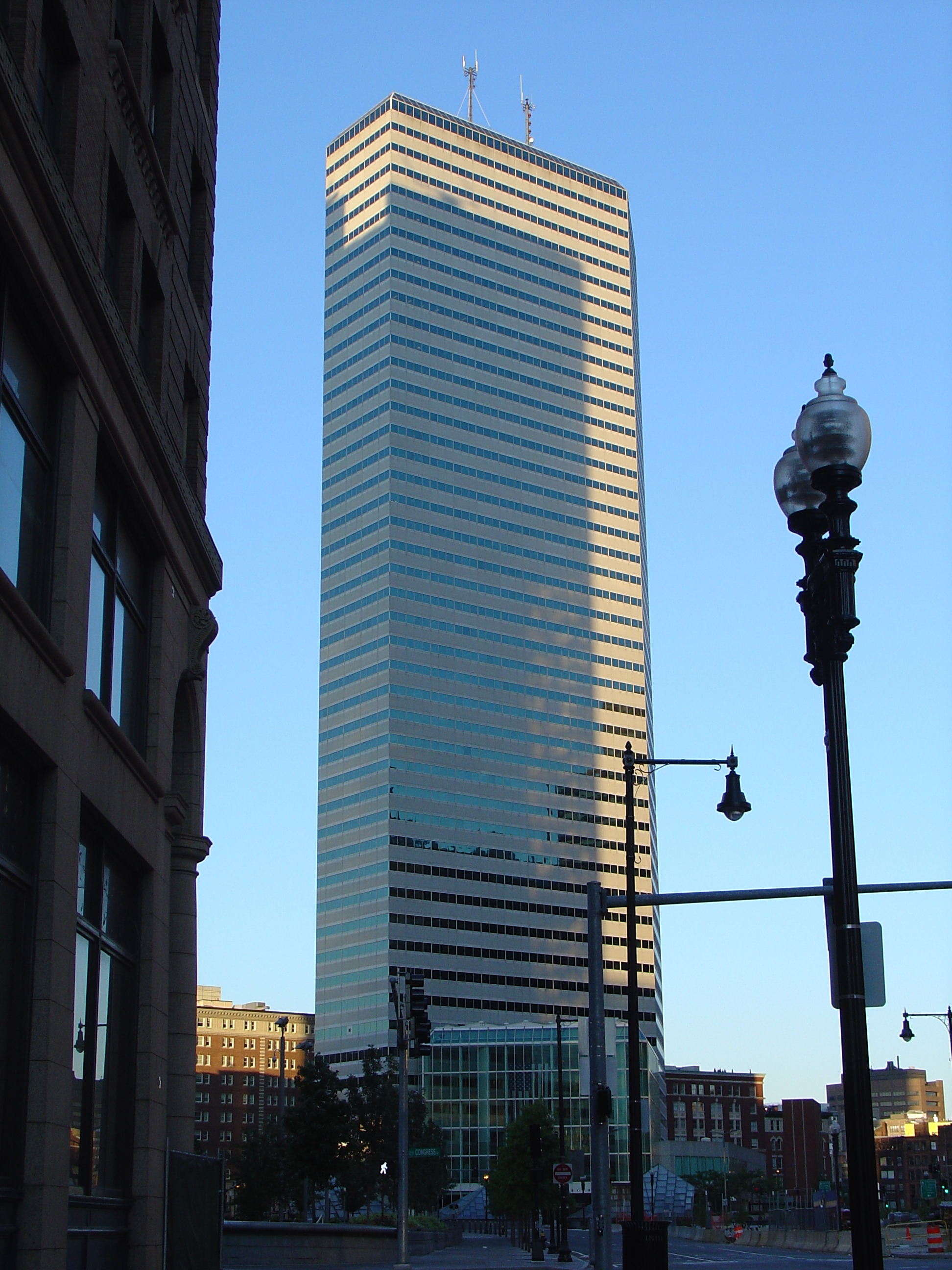
- Interactive map of the One Financial Center area

General information
- Type: Office
- Location: One Financial Center, Boston, Massachusetts, 02111
- Coordinates: 42°21′08.6″N 71°03′23.0″W
- Completed: 1983

Height
- Antenna spire: 683 ft (208 m)
- Roof: 590 ft (180 m)

Technical details
- Floor count: 46

Design and construction
- Architect: Pietro Belluschi
- Developer: Rose Associates

One Financial Center is a modern skyscraper adjacent to Dewey Square in the Financial District of Boston, Massachusetts. Built in 1983 by Rose Associates, it is Boston's 12th-tallest building, standing 590 feet (180 meters) tall, and housing 46 floors. An unusual 90 ft (27 m) tall glass-roofed lobby, known as the atrium, occupies the first two stories. The remaining stories are offices, home to a number of law firms, Certified Public Accountants, and financial services companies.

The building is located on a historic 1.23-acre (5,000 m^{2}) triangular piece of land next to South Station and the Federal Reserve Bank Building, joining the Fort Point Channel area with Boston's Financial District.

During the Big Dig (a project to create a new underground highway under the center of Boston), extra care was needed to avoid subsidence of the soil under the building, as construction was underway just 25 ft (7.6 m) from the building's foundation. The building was constructed on soil rather than bedrock due to the geography of the site.

The tower is topped off by two radio masts. Including its radio masts, One Financial Center is the 6th-tallest building in Boston (when measuring by pinnacle height), rising 683 feet (208 meters). Apart from the masts and their supporting cables, the roof of the building is flat with no crown.

== Tenants ==
- Citizens Bank
- HarbourVest Partners
- Loomis, Sayles & Company
- Mintz, Levin, Cohn, Ferris, Glovsky, and Popeo
- Technip
- Pandora Radio

== See also ==
- List of tallest buildings in Boston
