= Vital Speeches of the Day =

American magazine (1935-)

- Editor: David Murray
- Former editors: Thomas Daly III
- Categories: Politics
- Frequency: Monthly
- Publisher: Pro Rhetoric, LLC
- Founded: 1934
- First issue: October 8, 1935
- Country: United States
- Based in: Chicago, IL
- Language: English
- Website: www.vsotd.com
- ISSN: 0042-742X

Vital Speeches of the Day is an American monthly magazine that presents speeches and other public addresses in full.

== Overview ==
Vital Speeches was established in New York City in 1934 by Thomas Daly, whose grandson, Thomas Daly III, moved publication to South Carolina in 1986. It is published by Pro Rhetoric, LLC.

The magazine first appeared on October 8, 1934, and its first issue included speeches by US President Franklin Delano Roosevelt, Nobel Peace Prize winner Nicholas Murray Butler, David Lawrence, the legal expert Ferdinand Pecora and the economist and eugenicist Irving Fisher. Until 1995, the magazine had published speeches by every president since Roosevelt, although the publication avoided political campaign speeches. Its editor, Thomas Daly IV, said of such speeches, "A lot of that is hot air."

According to its policy statement:

The publisher of Vital Speeches believes that the important addresses of the recognized leaders of public opinion constitute the best expression of contemporary thought in America, and that it is extremely important for the welfare of the nation that these speeches be permanently recorded and disseminated. The publisher has no axe to grind. Vital Speeches will be found authentic and constructive.

The periodical is included in various guides to reference works. These guides typically describe it in politically neutral terms, as when Guide to Reference Materials summarised it as "Each semimonthly issue contains the full text of some 12 to 15 addresses on public issues delivered by important figures. The editors attempt to select speeches pertaining to all sides of controversial issues."

In January 2009, the magazine launched Vital Speeches International which compiles English-language texts from outside the United States.
