= Gideon Rose =

American academic and magazine editor (born 1963)

Gideon G. Rose
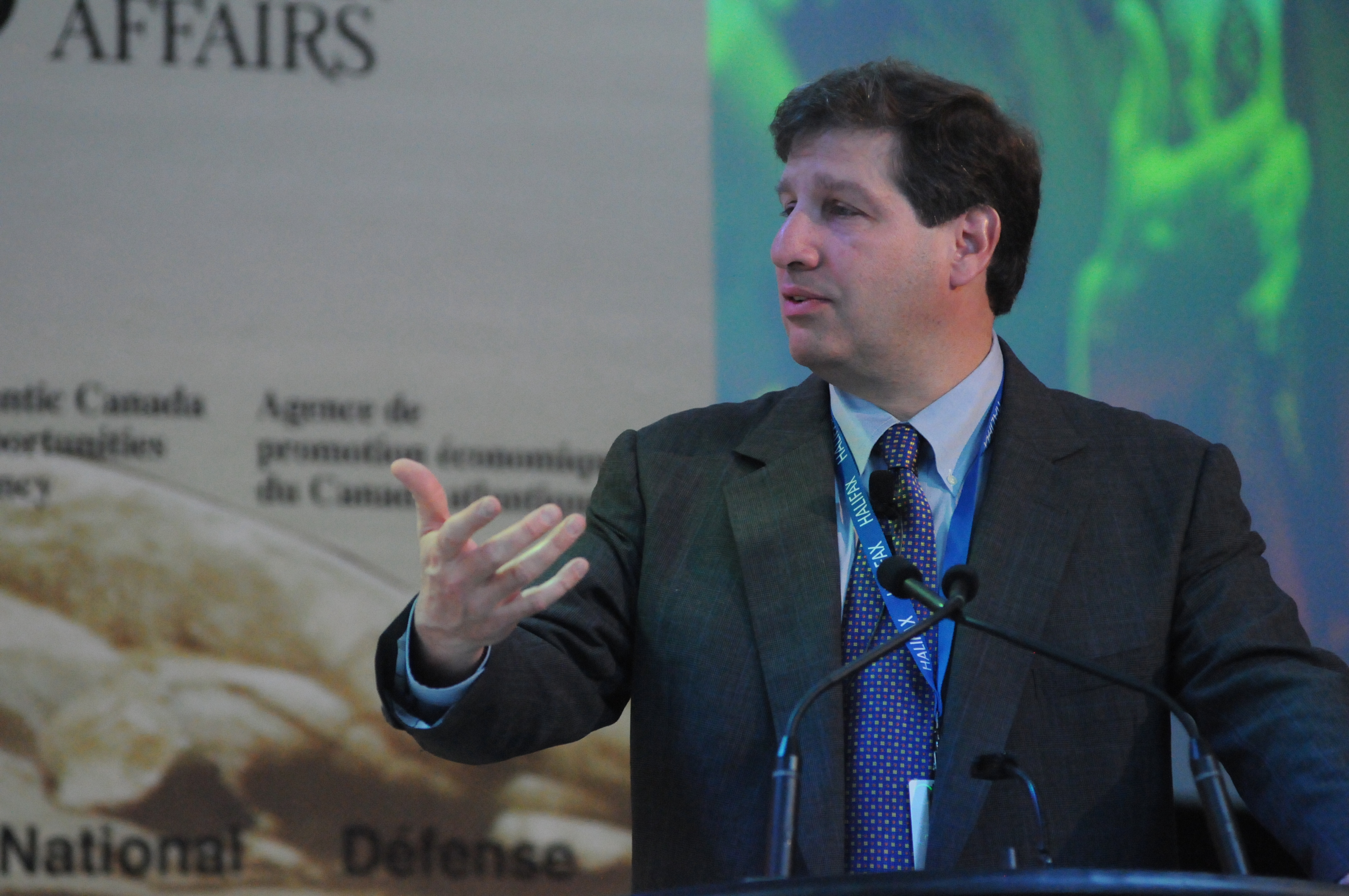
- Gideon Rose at the Halifax International Security Forum 2012
- Education: Yale University (BA); Harvard University (PhD)
- Occupations: Political and economic commentator
- Known for: Editor of Foreign Affairs
- Parent(s): Joanna Semel Rose; Daniel Rose
- Family: Frederick P. Rose (uncle); Jonathan F.P. Rose (cousin); David S. Rose (brother); Amy Rose Silverman (cousin)

Gideon Rose (born 1963) is a former editor of Foreign Affairs and a member of the Council on Foreign Relations. He served as associate director for Near East and South Asian Affairs on the staff of the National Security Council from 1994 to 1995 under the Clinton Administration.

== Early life and education ==
Rose was born to a Jewish family, the son of Joanna (née Semel) and Daniel Rose, a real estate developer. In 1985 he earned a B.A. in Classics from Yale University, where he was a member of Scroll and Key. He received his Ph.D. in government from Harvard University in 1994.

== Career ==
In 1985 Rose was appointed assistant editor of The National Interest, a foreign policy quarterly. He then went on to hold a similar position at a domestic quarterly, The Public Interest. He served as associate director for Near East and South Asian Affairs on the staff of the National Security Council from 1994 to 1995 under the Clinton administration.

In 1996, he joined Princeton University's Politics Department as a lecturer on American foreign policy and then held a similar position at the School of International and Public Affairs (SIPA) at Columbia University, where he currently teaches as an adjunct professor in the department of political science.

Rose was an Olin Senior Fellow and the deputy director of National Security Studies at the Council on Foreign Relations from 1995 to 2000, before he was appointed managing editor of Foreign Affairs to replace Fareed Zakaria. On June 3, 2010, it was announced that Rose would be succeeding James F. Hoge Jr. as the editor of Foreign Affairs. He took up the position on October 1, 2010. Rose left as editor in January 2021 and joined the Council on Foreign Relations' think tank to write a book. He was succeeded by Daniel Kurtz-Phelan.

== Works ==
- A New U.S. Policy Toward India and Pakistan (1997), with Richard N. Haass
- How Did This Happen?: Terrorism and the New War (2001), edited with James F. Hoge Jr.
- The Rise of China (2002), edited with James F. Hoge Jr.
- The War on Terror (2002), edited with James F. Hoge Jr.
- The Middle East in Crisis (2002), edited with James F. Hoge Jr.
- America and the World: Debating the New Shape of International Politics (2003), edited with James F. Hoge Jr.
- American Foreign Policy: Cases and (2003), with James F. Hoge Jr.
- Understanding the War on Terror (2005), with James F. Hoge Jr.
- How Wars End: Why We Always Fight the Last Battle (2010)
- Among Nations: Readings in International Relations (2010), editor
- The New Arab Revolt: What Happened, What It Means, and What Comes Next
- The Clash of Ideas: The Ideological Battles that Made the Modern World - And Will Shape the Future (2011), with Jonathan Tepperman
- The U.S. vs. Al Qaeda: A History of the War on Terror (2011), edited with Jonathan Tepperman
- "Making Modernity Work; The Reconciliation of Capitalism and Democracy", Foreign Affairs (January/February 2012)

== See also ==
- Capitalism
- Council on Foreign Relations
- Democracy
- Foreign Affairs
- James Hoge
