= Daniel Rose (real estate developer) =

American real estate developer

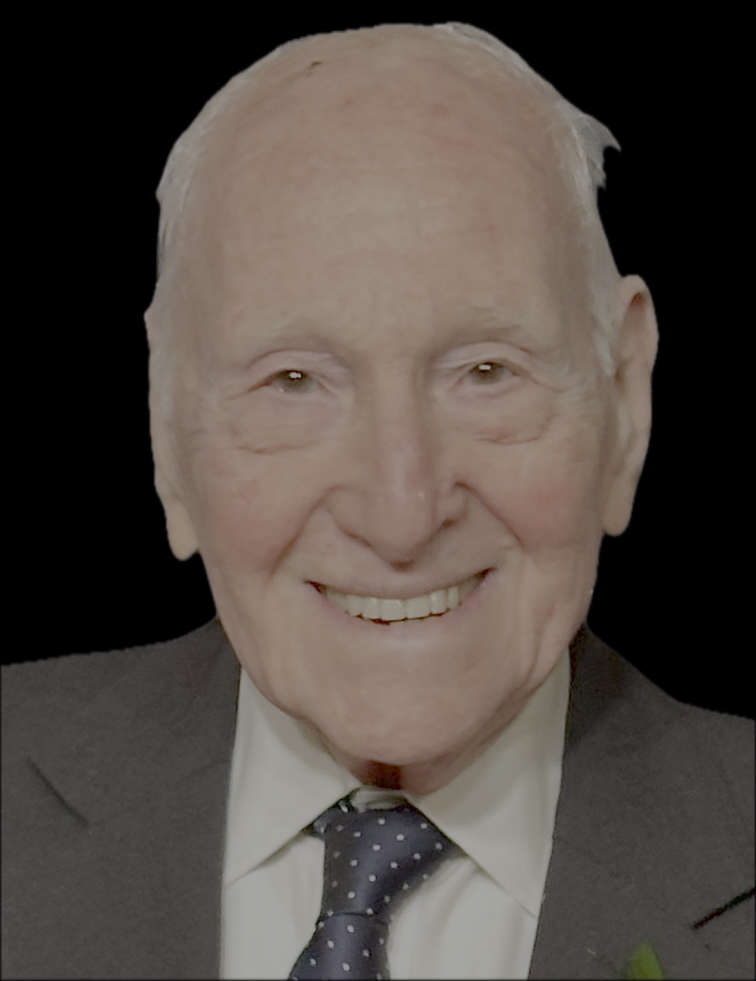
- Rose in 2023
- Born: October 31, 1929 (age 97); New York City, U.S.
- Education: Yale University
- Occupations: real estate developer, essayist
- Known for: Pentagon City, One Financial Center, Manhattan Plaza, HEAF
- Spouse: Joanna Semel Rose
- Children: David S. Rose; Joseph B. Rose; Emily Rose; Gideon Rose
- Parent(s): Belle Rose; Samuel B. Rose
- Family: David Rose (uncle); Frederick P. Rose (brother); Elihu Rose (brother)
- Website: http://danielrose.org

Daniel Rose (born 1929) is an American real estate developer, philanthropist, and essayist.

Rose developed the Pentagon City complex adjacent to Reagan Washington National Airport, the One Financial Center and Keystone Building office towers that anchored the redevelopment of Downtown Boston, and conceived and reinvented a New York City real estate apartment complex into Manhattan Plaza for the Performing Arts.

A philanthropist, he founded the inner-city youth education program, the Harlem Educational Activities Fund, he also established academic and professional educational programs, and served in several government administrations in unpaid advisory roles. His award-winning essays and speeches have covered subjects as diverse as economics, inner city education, racial problems, social injustice, real estate, food and wine, and housing.

== Early life and education ==
Rose was born to a Jewish family in Brooklyn, New York City, one of four sons of Belle and Samuel B. Rose. He has one surviving brother, Elihu Rose. He attended Horace Mann High School in The Bronx and then Yale University.

== Career ==
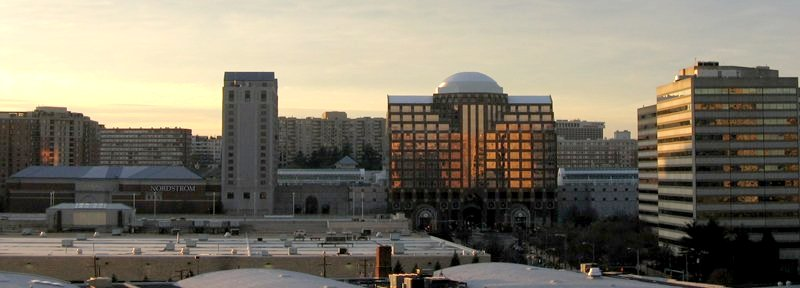
Pentagon City in Arlington County, Virginia

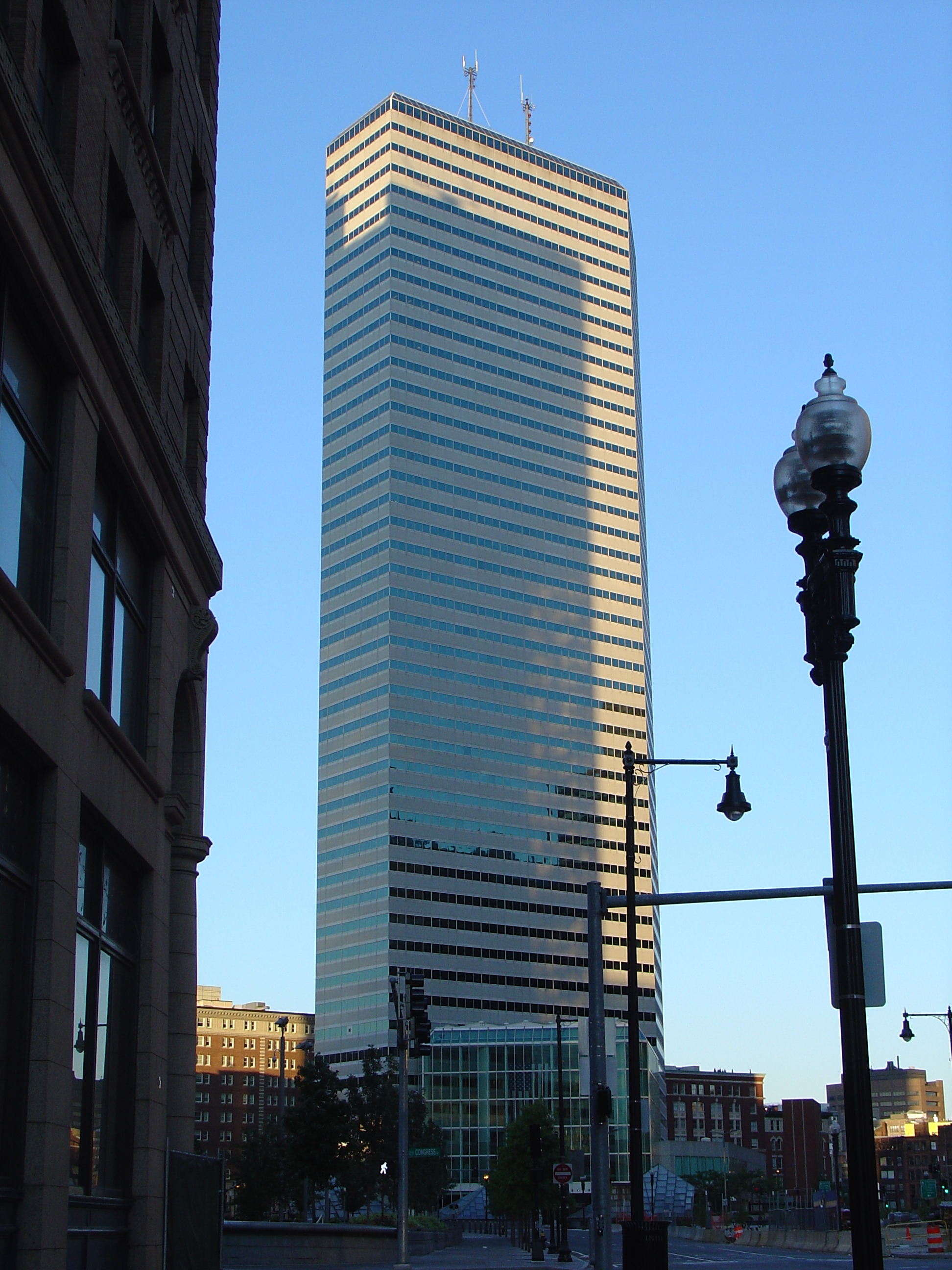
One Financial Center in Boston

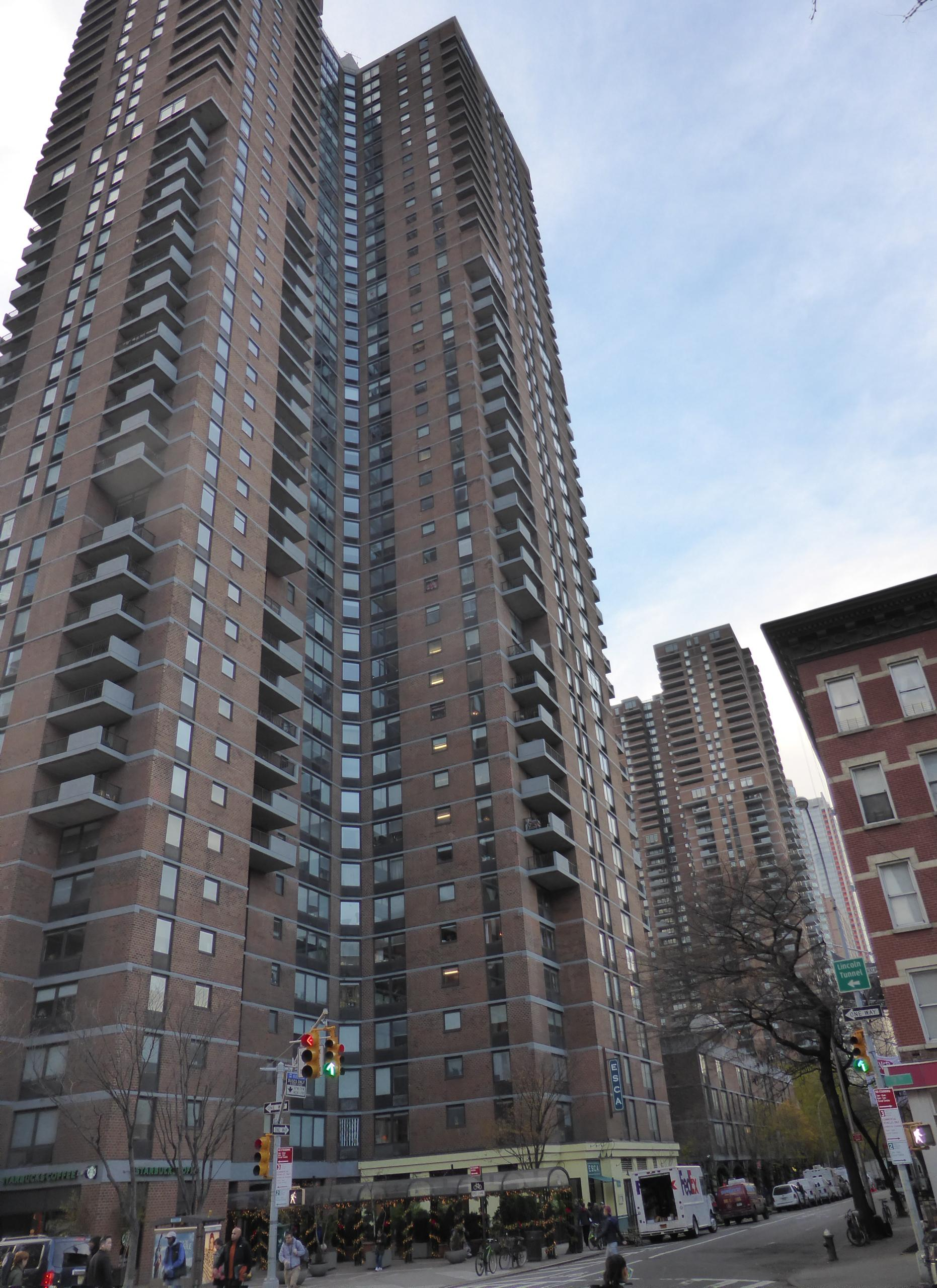
Manhattan Plaza in New York City

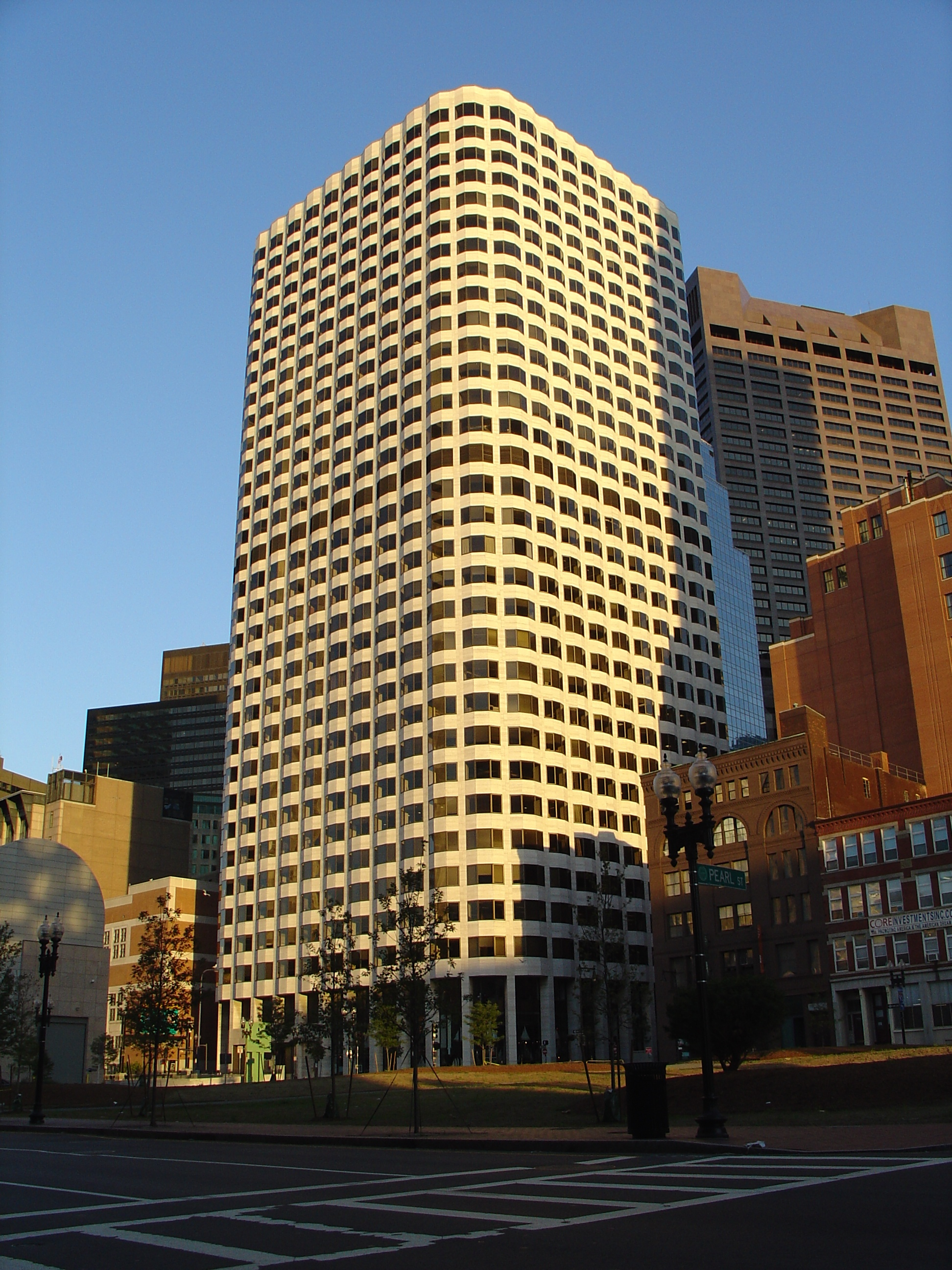
99 High Street in Boston

Rose served as a military intelligence analyst and Russian language specialist with the U.S. Air Force during the Korean War.

Following his military service, he joined the family real estate development company, Rose Associates, founded by his father and his uncle, David Rose in 1928. Among other major projects, Daniel Rose led the development of Pentagon City in Arlington County, Virginia, adjacent to Ronald Reagan Washington National Airport, and 99 High Street and One Financial Center adjacent to South Station in Downtown Boston as President of the firm, and became Chairman after the death of his brother, Frederick P. Rose in 1999.

As an institutional consultant, Rose was responsible for the creation and implementation of the innovative “housing for the performing arts” concept for New York's Manhattan Plaza. By 2006, Rose Associates managed over 31,000 apartments in New York City, including Stuyvesant Town and Peter Cooper Village.

He was a Director of 20 Dreyfus-sponsored mutual funds, served as a Director of U.S. Trust Corporation, a Trustee of Corporate Property Investors from 1972 to 1998, as Expert Advisor to the Secretary of Housing and Urban Development, as Expert/Consultant to the Commissioner of Education, Department of Health, Education and Welfare, and as a founding director of the New York Convention Center Development Corp.

In his later years, Rose's reputation as a "legendary" business executive established him as a mentor and role model for aspiring young entrepreneurs and real estate executives, and many of his epigrams and quotations have gained wide currency.

=== Philanthropy and public service ===
Rose is the co-founder and Chairman Emeritus of the Harlem Educational Activities Fund, a highly acclaimed initiative that has helped thousands of inner city youth enter college since 1989. He has served on the boards of the New York State Council for the Humanities; the New York Institute for the Humanities; the Museum of the City of New York; the Urban Land Institute; the Committee for Economic Development; the Citizens Housing and Planning Council of New York; the New York Convention Center Development Corp; the Realty Foundation of New York; the Urban Land Foundation; the Police Athletic League; the Jewish Community Centers Association; the Jewish Publication Society; and the Federation of Jewish Philanthropies of New York.

Rose's other major philanthropic initiatives include serving as Chairman of the Board of the Horace Mann School, an institution to which he has contributed endowed chairs and which honored him, together with his family, with the naming of Rose Hall; the establishment of the Daniel Rose Chair in Urban Economics at M.I.T. (the nation's first), the Rose Center for Public Leadership at the Urban Land Institute, the joint Yale/Technion Rose Homeland Security and Counter-Terrorism Program, the Jacobs Technion-Cornell Institute at Cornell Tech (founding Board Member), the Helping Africa Foundation (Chairman), and a major new initiative in Accra, Ghana to restore and rebuild the W. E. B. Du Bois Memorial Centre for Pan African Culture. With his late wife, Joanna Semel Rose, Rose has contributed to hundreds of other charitable organizations addressing racial, religious, academic, and humanitarian issues. Among their philanthropic activities was providing the seed funding that enabled production of the award-winning educational television series Cosmos: A Spacetime Odyssey, hosted by Neil DeGrasse Tyson.

A military intelligence analyst and Russian language specialist with the U.S. Air Force during the Korean War, Rose has pursued his interest in foreign affairs as an officer of the Foreign Policy Association, the Council on Foreign Relations and the International Institute for Strategic Studies. He was a founding board member of the EastWest Institute and was appointed by President Bill Clinton as Vice Chairman of the Baltic-American Enterprise Fund, a U.S.-government-funded organization that promotes free trade in Latvia, Lithuania and Estonia. He then became a Director of the Baltic-American Freedom Foundation, its “legacy” philanthropic foundation. From 2004 to 2006, he was a frequent participant by telephone on Forum, an English language political discussion TV program broadcast from Tehran, Iran.

=== Writings ===
An essayist and speechwriter, Rose is a six-time winner of the Cicero Speechwriting Award given annually by Vital Speeches of the Day magazine. A 2015 collection of his speeches, "Making a Living, Making a Life" was named one of the Best Books of 2015 by Kirkus Reviews, which described it as "A wise, well-honed collection of speeches that address vital issues with fresh, penetrating insight." Covering subjects as diverse as economics, inner city education, racial problems, real estate, food & wine, and housing, his writings occasioned Fareed Zakaria's assessment that "Dan Rose has created a body of work that is philosophy at its most useful: how does one live a good life.". A second compilation, "The Examined Life", was published in 2019, containing more recent essays and speeches as well as personal vignettes of his life. In addition to his own works, Rose contributed to "The Vintage Magazine Consumer Guide to Wine", and Henry Louis Gates Jr.'s "America Behind the Color Line: Dialogues with African Americans".

== Awards ==
Rose received the James E. Landauer Award from the American Society of Real Estate Counselors; the Award for Community Service from the Building Owners and Managers Association; the Award for Excellence for Large Scale Mixed Use Development from the Urban Land Institute; and Man of the Year Award from the Realty Foundation of New York. In 2003, he was named Ernst & Young's “Entrepreneur of the Year” in real estate. He has received Honorary Doctorates from Long Island University; Technion-Israel Institute of Technology and New York University.

Other honors Rose has received include the Mayor's Award of Honor for Arts and Culture from the City of New York; the Joseph Papp Racial Harmony Award from the Foundation for Ethnic Understanding; the Business Leadership Award from the National Committee on American Foreign Policy, the Harlem Renaissance Award from the Abyssinian Development Corporation, and the Golden Plate Award from the Academy of Achievement. In 2012 he was inducted as a Fellow of the American Academy of Arts and Sciences, together with his wife, Joanna Semel Rose The main-belt asteroid 70712 Danieljoanna, discovered by the Catalina Sky Survey in 1999, was named in their honor, while 70718 HEAF was named for the Harlem Educational Activities Fund (HEAF).

Books dedicated to Daniel and Joanna S. Rose include George Steiner's In Bluebeard's Castle, Henry Louis Gates, Jr.'s Life Upon These Shores—Looking at African American History, Geoffrey Hartman's Scars of the Spirit, Fareed Zakaria's "Ten Lessons for a Post-Pandemic World", and David S. Rose's The Startup Checklist. Charles Duff's book, "The North Atlantic Cities" was also dedicated to him.

== Personal life ==
Rose was married to Joanna (née Semel), the long-time Chairman of Partisan Review magazine, until her death in 2021. They have four children: David Semel Rose Joseph Benedict Rose, Emily Rose, and Gideon Gregory Rose.
