= David S. Rose =

American entrepreneur and investor (born 1957)

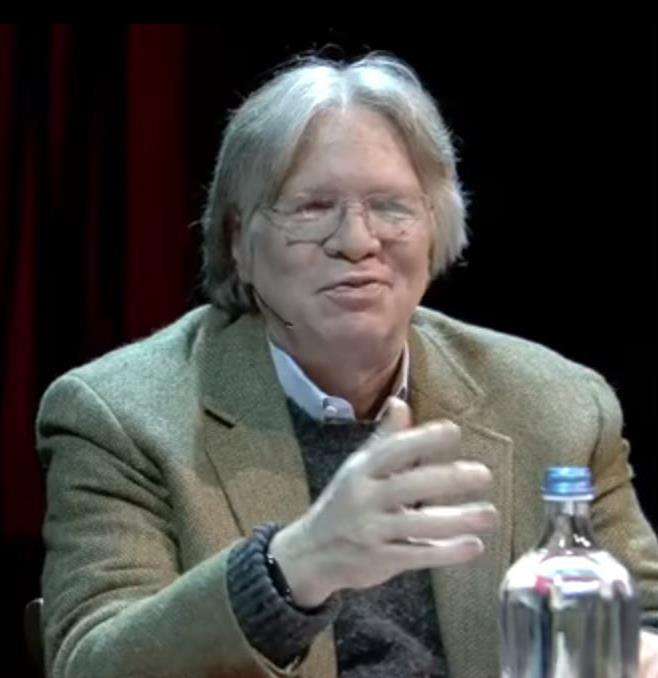
- Born: David Semel Rose; June 12, 1957 (age 69)
- Education: Yale University; Columbia Business School
- Occupation: Angel Investor
- Known for: Founder of New York Angels
- Spouse: Gail Ruth Gremse
- Parent(s): Joanna Semel Rose; Daniel Rose
- Family: Gideon Rose (brother); Joseph Benedict Rose (brother); Amy Rose Silverman (cousin)

David S. Rose

David Semel Rose (born June 12, 1957) is an American serial entrepreneur and angel investor. He is Chairman & CEO of the U.S Real Estate Market, a liquidity platform for institutional real estate investments, Managing Partner of Rose Tech Ventures, a venture fund focused on Internet-based business, and Executive Chairman of Gust, which operates a collaboration platform for early stage angel investing. He is the non-executive Chairman of the Board of the artificial intelligence company Thinkable AI and the online travel platform Bookitngo.

== Early life and education ==
Rose is the son of Joanna (née Semel) and Daniel Rose. Rose attended New York City public schools and Horace Mann High School. He received his BA in Urban Affairs from Yale University in 1979, his MBA in Finance from Columbia Business School in 1983 and an honorary Doctor of Engineering degree from Stevens Institute of Technology.

== Career ==
Rose was involved in the early development of the Silicon Alley technology community in New York, including working with pre-Internet era online data services and founding Ex Machina, a computer software company; The Computer Classroom, an early personal computer training company; and AirMedia, an early wireless Internet information network.

Rose founded and runs a technology incubator in New York City and is a founding member of the Space Angels Network, an international investing group. In 2005, BusinessWeek magazine included an article titled 'The Pitch Coach' about his sessions for entrepreneurs seeking funding from venture capitalists and angel investors. He is an Associate Founder of Singularity University, the post-graduate program in accelerating technologies, and founded and chaired its Finance, Entrepreneurship and Economics track.

In 2025, Rose participated in public events with futurist Ray Kurzweil on the implications of AI and the coming technological singularity.

== Personal life ==
In 1982, he married Gail Ruth Gremse. They have three children.
