= List of Horace Mann School alumni =

List of notable alumni of Horace Mann School in the Bronx, New York

This is a list of notable alumni of Horace Mann School in the Bronx, New York.

- Desiree Akhavan '02, director, writer, actress; winner 2018 Sundance Film Festival Grand Jury Prize
- Peter Lewis Allen '74, academic, executive coach, author
- Pedro Álvarez '05, Major League baseball player for the Pittsburgh Pirates and Baltimore Orioles
- Harrison Bader ‘12, Major League baseball outfielder for the Philadelphia Phillies, St. Louis Cardinals, New York Yankees, Cincinnati Reds, New York Mets, and Minnesota Twins
- Erik Barnouw, writer, critic, documentary filmmaker, Columbia University professor
- William Barr, U.S. attorney general under President George H. W. Bush and the first term of Donald Trump
- Alex Berenson, spy novelist, former reporter for The New York Times
- Josh Bernstein ‘89, host of The History Channel's Digging For the Truth
- Ilse Bischoff, painter, printmaker, illustrator, and author
- Alan Blinken, former United States ambassador to Belgium (1993–97)
- Donald M. Blinken, investment banker, former ambassador to Hungary
- Adam Brook, thoracic surgeon
- Amy S. Bruckman, ‘83, Professor at Georgia Institute of Technology
- Robert Caro ‘53, author and two-time Pulitzer Prize winner
- Elliott Carter, composer and two-time Pulitzer Prize-winner
- Chao-chu Chi, returned to China and became interpreter for Zhou Enlai and Mao Zedong
- Roy Cohn, aide to Senator Joseph McCarthy, lead prosecutor in the Julius and Ethel Rosenberg trial, mentor to Donald Trump
- David Cornstein, US ambassador to Hungary
- Joseph Cumming, Yale scholar and pastor
- John Dall, actor
- Jerome Alan Danzig, reporter, news producer, and adviser to New York governor Nelson A. Rockefeller
- Peter Deutsch, former congressman
- Valentine Davies, class of 1923, author of Miracle on 34th Street
- Bethany Donaphin, class of 1998, Head of Operations at the Women's National Basketball Association
- Orvil Dryfoos, publisher of The New York Times
- Martin Duberman, class of 1948, author and gay rights historian
- Seymour Durst, real estate developer
- Morris Leopold Ernst, lawyer and co-founder the American Civil Liberties Union
- Charles Evans, founder of fashion house Evan-Piccone, and producer of Tootsie
- Halley Feiffer, class of 2003, playwright
- Ivan Fisher, lawyer
- Marc Fisher, class of 1976, writer and editor for The Washington Post
- Doris Fleischman, writer, public relations executive, and feminist activist
- Jennifer Fleiss, entrepreneur and co-founder of Rent the Runway
- Peter B. Freund, sports team owner
- Alan Furst, novelist
- Henry Geldzahler, class of 1953, art critic, curator, New York City Cultural Affairs commissioner (1977–1982)
- Carl Gershman, president of the National Endowment for Democracy
- Mark Gerstein, bioinformatics professor, Yale University
- Alison Gertz, early AIDS activist
- Bill Green, Republican member of the US House of Representatives from New York
- Alexandra Guarnaschelli, executive chef and food television personality
- Betty Hall, politician, New Hampshire state representative
- Arthur Julian Harvey, born 1932, Harvey Organics lawsuit, organic blueberry farmer, peace activist, friend of Adam Clymer and collected stamps in high school with Dr. Bart, husband to Elizabeth, father to Emily and Max, grandfather to Jonah, Ruby, Alice and Gemma
- Joshua Hammer, journalist and author
- Leland Hayward, Hollywood agent and Broadway producer
- Anthony Hecht, poet
- Robert Heilbroner, economist, historian of economic thought, author
- Marsha Hunt, actress
- Anjli Jain, venture capitalist
- E. J. Kahn, class of 1933, pillar of The New Yorker, author and journalist
- Rockwell Kent, illustrator and painter
- Jack Kerouac, class of 1940, writer and Beat Literature iconoclast
- Richard Kluger, class of 1952, author and Pulitzer Prize winner
- Edward Koren, New Yorker cartoonist
- Herbert J. Kramer, class of 1939, director of Public Affairs at the Office of Economic Opportunity under the Johnson administration
- Robert Ledley, class of 1943, inventor of whole-body CT scanner, biomedical computing pioneer
- Sir Thomas Legg, senior British civil servant
- Tom Lehrer, political satirist, songwriter, and math professor
- David Leonhardt, economics columnist for The New York Times, Pulitzer Prize winner for commentary, 2011
- Ira Levin, author of Rosemary's Baby and The Stepford Wives
- Andrew Levitas, artist and filmmaker
- Anthony Lewis, class of 1944, journalist and two-time Pulitzer Prize-winner
- Allard K. Lowenstein, civil rights leader and former congressman
- Joshua Malina, actor and member of the cast of the television series The West Wing
- David Mandel, class of 1988, television writer and producer for Curb Your Enthusiasm
- Jonathan Marks, class of 1971, anthropologist
- Michael Mazur, artist
- Dorothy Miner, class of 1922, art historian and curator at the Walters Art Museum
- Dwight C. Miner, class of 1922, professor of history at Columbia University
- Lucy Monroe, operatic soprano
- Belle Moskowitz, likely class of 1893, early twentieth century progressive reformer and political advisor, referred to in her New York Times obituary as the most powerful woman in U.S. politics
- Martin Moynihan, class of 1946, ethologist and founding director of the Smithsonian Tropical Research Institute in Panama
- James Murdoch, media executive; son of Rupert Murdoch
- Donald Newhouse, publisher
- Samuel Newhouse, media executive
- Rebecca Oppenheimer, class of 1990, astrophysicist
- Ilario Pantano, class of 1989, former marine, political figure
- Nelson Peltz (born 1942), billionaire businessman and investor
- Mark Penn, pollster and political consultant
- Mary Petty, illustrator
- Kenneth Pollack, analyst and author on Middle East affairs
- Generoso Pope, Jr., founder of the National Enquirer and American Media, Inc.
- Thomas S. Power, led Strategic Air Command
- Paul Rapoport, co-founder of New York City Lesbian, Gay, Bisexual and Transgender Community Services Center and Gay Men's Health Crisis
- Giles Sutherland Rich, patent attorney, author of the 1952 Patent Act, judge of the U.S. Customs and Patent Appeals and later U.S. Court of Appeals for the Federal Circuit
- Renée Richards, class of 1952 (graduated as Richard Raskind), professional tennis player, author, ophthalmologist, and trans rights activist
- Scott Rogowsky, class of 2003, comedian and host of HQ Trivia
- Daniel Rose, real estate developer, philanthropist, essayist
- David S. Rose, entrepreneur, investor and author
- Elihu Rose, real estate developer and military historian
- Frederick P. Rose, builder and philanthropist
- Gideon Rose, Foreign Affairs
- Jonathan F. P. Rose, urban planner and real estate developer
- Evan Rosen, journalist, strategist, author of The Culture of Collaboration and The Bounty Effect
- Jon Rubinstein, computer scientist and electrical engineer; a primary co-creator of the iPod and iMac
- Edward Thomas Ryan, class of 1980, Harvard microbiologist, immunologist
- James Salter, class of 1942, writer
- David Sanders, class of 1979, biologist
- Marion K. Sanders, class of 1921, journalist, editor, author
- Barry Scheck, class of 1967, member of legal team that successfully defended O. J. Simpson; attorney and founder of the Innocence Project
- James Schlesinger, former secretary of defense in the Nixon and Ford administrations and former secretary of energy in the Carter Administration
- Doug Schoen, political pollster, consultant and pundit; former partner of HM classmate Mark Penn
- John Searle, philosopher
- Charles Seife, class of 1989, mathematician and author
- Noah Shachtman, class of 1989, editor of The Daily Beast
- Gil Shaham, class of 1989, violinist
- Orli Shaham, class of 1993, pianist
- John Simon, New York Magazine critic and author
- Andrew Solomon, class of 1981, writer
- Jerry Speyer, class of 1958, a founder of Tishman Speyer
- Eliot Spitzer, former governor and attorney general of New York
- Austin Stark, award-winning filmmaker
- Edward Steinfeld, class of 1984, noted political scientist
- Arthur Hays Sulzberger, publisher of The New York Times
- Robert W. Sweet, United States district court judge
- Robert Tishman, real estate developer and co-founder of Tishman Speyer
- Beatrice Warde, writer and scholar on typography, author of “The Crystal Goblet, or Printing Should Be Invisible”
- Paul Francis Webster, class of 1926, Academy Award-winning and Grammy Award-winning songwriter
- Gertrude Weil, class of 1897 (or 1898?), suffragist, labor rights activist, civil rights and anti-lynching activist, and Zionist
- William Carlos Williams, class of 1903, medical doctor and poet; Pulitzer Prize winner
- Ben Yagoda, journalist and author
- Rafael Yglesias, novelist and screenwriter
- Paul Zimmerman, senior football writer for Sports Illustrated
