= Columbia University traditions =

Traditions of university in New York

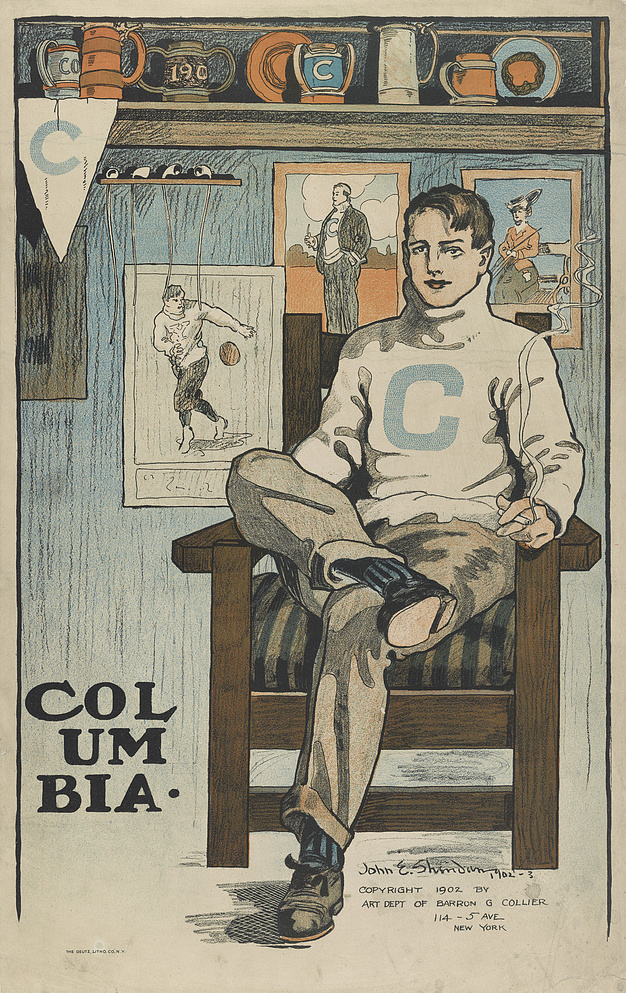
The archetypal Columbia man, poster from 1902

Columbia University has developed many traditions over its 272-year-long existence, most of them associated with its oldest undergraduate division, Columbia College.

== Current traditions ==
=== Orientation traditions ===
Several traditions take place during the New Student Orientation Program (NSOP) in order to inaugurate new freshmen into the community. During NSOP, students are given time to explore New York City and acquaint themselves with its transportation system. In the First Year March, first-years exit Alfred Lerner Hall through its back doors, turn right and enter campus again through the main gates while being serenaded by staff and administrators to officially become Columbia students. To introduce students to the Columbia Core Curriculum, all Columbia College freshmen attend their first Literature Humanities lecture on the Iliad during NSOP. Students are also gifted a copy of one of the Homeric epics, either the Iliad or the Odyssey, by representatives of the Columbia College Alumni Association.

=== The Varsity Show ===
The Varsity Show is an annual full-length musical written by and for students, and is one of Columbia's oldest traditions. The content of Varsity Shows often satirize many aspects of life at Columbia, including admissions, the Core Curriculum, the university's history, and the administration. Founded in 1894 as a fundraiser for Columbia's athletic teams, past writers and directors have included Columbians Richard Rodgers and Oscar Hammerstein, Lorenz Hart, I.A.L. Diamond, and Herman Wouk. Recent performers have included Jenny Slate, Greta Gerwig, and Kate McKinnon, the latter two both appearing in the 2005 Varsity Show, "The Sound of Muses". The show has one of the largest operating budgets of all university events.

The Columbia University fight song, "Roar, Lion, Roar", written by Corey Ford, Roy Webb, and Morris W. Watkins, originates from the 1923 Varsity Show, Half Moon Inn. Varsity Shows have traditionally featured pony ballets, which prior to the introduction of female performers in 1968, involved cross-dressing.

=== Joyce Kilmer Memorial Annual Bad Poetry Contest ===
Your pith in my nails
As I peel you, stinging juice
Squirts into my soul

— Dylan Temel, “A Story of Unrequited Love in 5 Haikus" (2018)

Beginning in 1986, the Philolexian Society has hosted this open-to-the-public event in honor of Alfred Joyce Kilmer (Class of 1908), vice president of the society and the author of "Trees". Contestants read their wittiest and worst original poetry, hoping for cheers and the title of Poet Laureate. The event, which regularly draws 200 people or more, generally takes place a week before Thanksgiving.

=== Morningside Lights ===
Morningside Lights is an annual procession through the Columbia campus featuring decorated lanterns made by members of the Morningside Heights community. The tradition began in 2012 as a collaboration between the Columbia University Art Initiative and Miller Theatre. Past themes for Morningside Lights, many of which celebrate Columbia's Upper Manhattan heritage, have included "The Imagined City" (2012), "Odysseus on the A Train" (2014), "TRAVERSE" (2016, celebrating the centennial of the Pulitzer Prize), and "Harlem Night Song" (2020).

=== Tree-Lighting and Yule Log Ceremonies ===
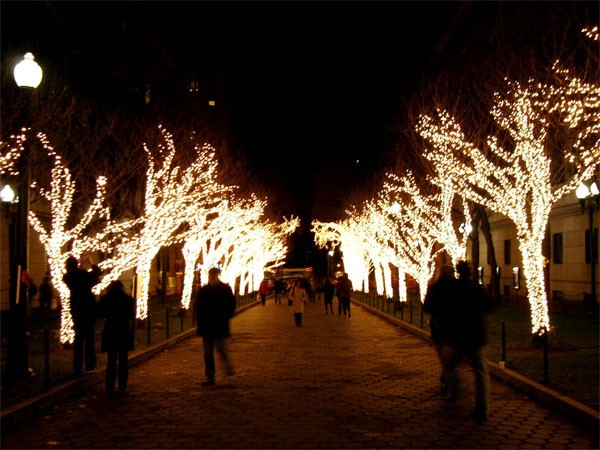
College Walk is illuminated in the winter months

The campus Tree Lighting ceremony was inaugurated in 1998. It celebrates the illumination of the medium-sized trees lining College Walk in front of Kent Hall and Hamilton Hall on the east end and Dodge Hall and Pulitzer Hall on the west, just before finals week in early December. The lights remain on until February 28. Students meet at the sundial for free hot chocolate, performances by a cappella groups, and speeches by the university president and a guest.

Immediately following the College Walk festivities is one of Columbia's older holiday traditions, the lighting of the Yule Log. The Christmas ceremony dates to 1910 under President Nicholas Murray Butler. A troop of students dressed as Continental Army soldiers carry the eponymous log from the sun-dial to the lounge of John Jay Hall, where it is lit amid the singing of seasonal carols. The Christmas ceremony is accompanied by a reading of A Visit From St. Nicholas by Clement Clarke Moore and Yes, Virginia, There is a Santa Claus by Francis Pharcellus Church. In 1963, the Yule Log ceremony was presided over by Dwight C. Miner.

=== 40s on 40 ===
With forty days remaining until graduation, seniors drink 40oz malt liquor on the steps of Low Library to reminisce and celebrate their impending graduation. Regarded as a rite of passage, the event usually leaves debris on the steps and gives passing tour groups a unique impression of the school. The tradition, which began in the early 2000s, has been intermittently sponsored by the administration in an attempt to regulate the event, ostensibly for the sake of student safety.

=== Protests ===
Student activism has a long history at Columbia, going as far back as students, such as Alexander Hamilton, and student organizations, including the Hearts of Oak militia, fomenting revolution on campus against the British and loyalist members of the administration in the lead-up to the American Revolution. The most notable instance of protest at Columbia took place in 1968, and was widely covered in national media for its entire duration. The Columbia Daily Spectator has noted that Hamilton Hall was occupied by students on ten separate occasions between 1968 and 1996: "Every university has its little traditions—at Columbia, these happen to involve dissent, rebellion, and violent takeover. For those behind the times, a brief history of protest at Columbia, and a word of caution: Steer clear of Hamilton Hall in the spring."

=== Commencement ===
The first commencement at Columbia University was held on June 21, 1758, when the university, then known as King's College, conferred seven degrees upon its first graduating class. Since then, numerous traditions have evolved around the ceremony. Today, the university graduates several thousand students each year from its several undergraduate colleges, graduate schools, and affiliated institutions.

During commencement, students are required to don their academic regalia, and traditionally brandish items representative of their respective schools during the centuries-old ceremony. In addition to "Stand, Columbia," several songs have become associated with commencement at Columbia, including Frank Sinatra's "New York, New York" and Jay-Z's "Empire State of Mind."

== Past traditions ==
=== Orgo Night ===
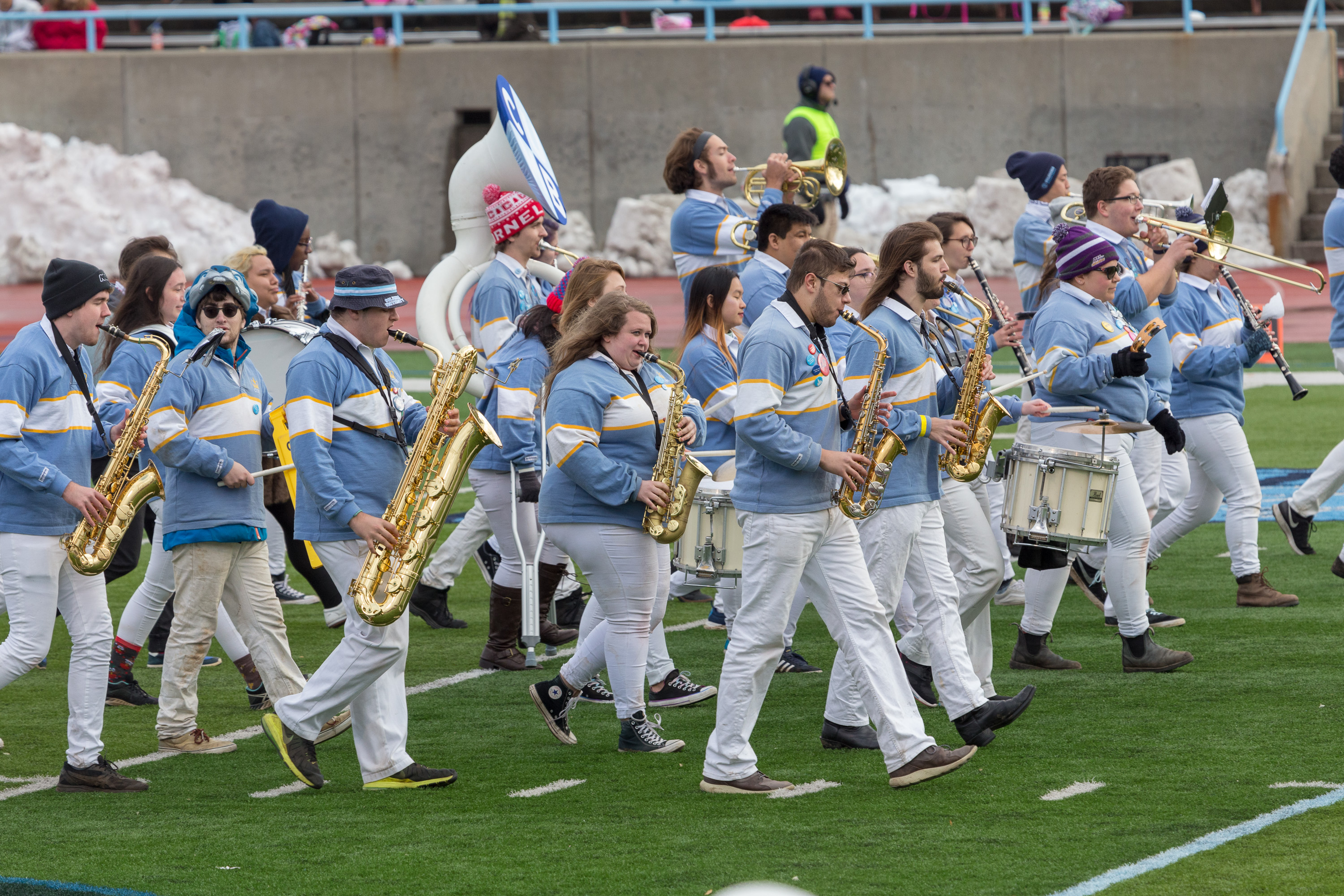
The Columbia University Marching Band in 2018

The tradition of Orgo Night began in 1975, and was discontinued in 2020 with the dissolution of CUMB. On the day before the Organic Chemistry exam—which is often on the first day of finals—at precisely the stroke of midnight, the Columbia University Marching Band (CUMB) occupied Butler Library to distract diligent students from studying in an attempt to raise the curve on the organic chemistry exam. After a forty-five minutes or so of jokes and music, the procession moved out to the lawn in front of Hartley, Wallach and John Jay residence halls to entertain the residents there. The Band then played at various other locations around Morningside Heights, including the residential quadrangle of Barnard College, where students of the all-women's school, in mock-consternation, rained trash—including notes and course packets—and water balloons upon them from their dormitories above. The Band tended to close their Orgo Night performances before Furnald Hall, known among students as the more studious and reportedly "anti-social" residence hall, where the underclassmen in the Band serenaded the graduating seniors with an entertaining, though vulgar, mock-hymn to Columbia, composed of quips that poke fun at the various stereotypes about the Columbia student body.

== Columbia songs ==
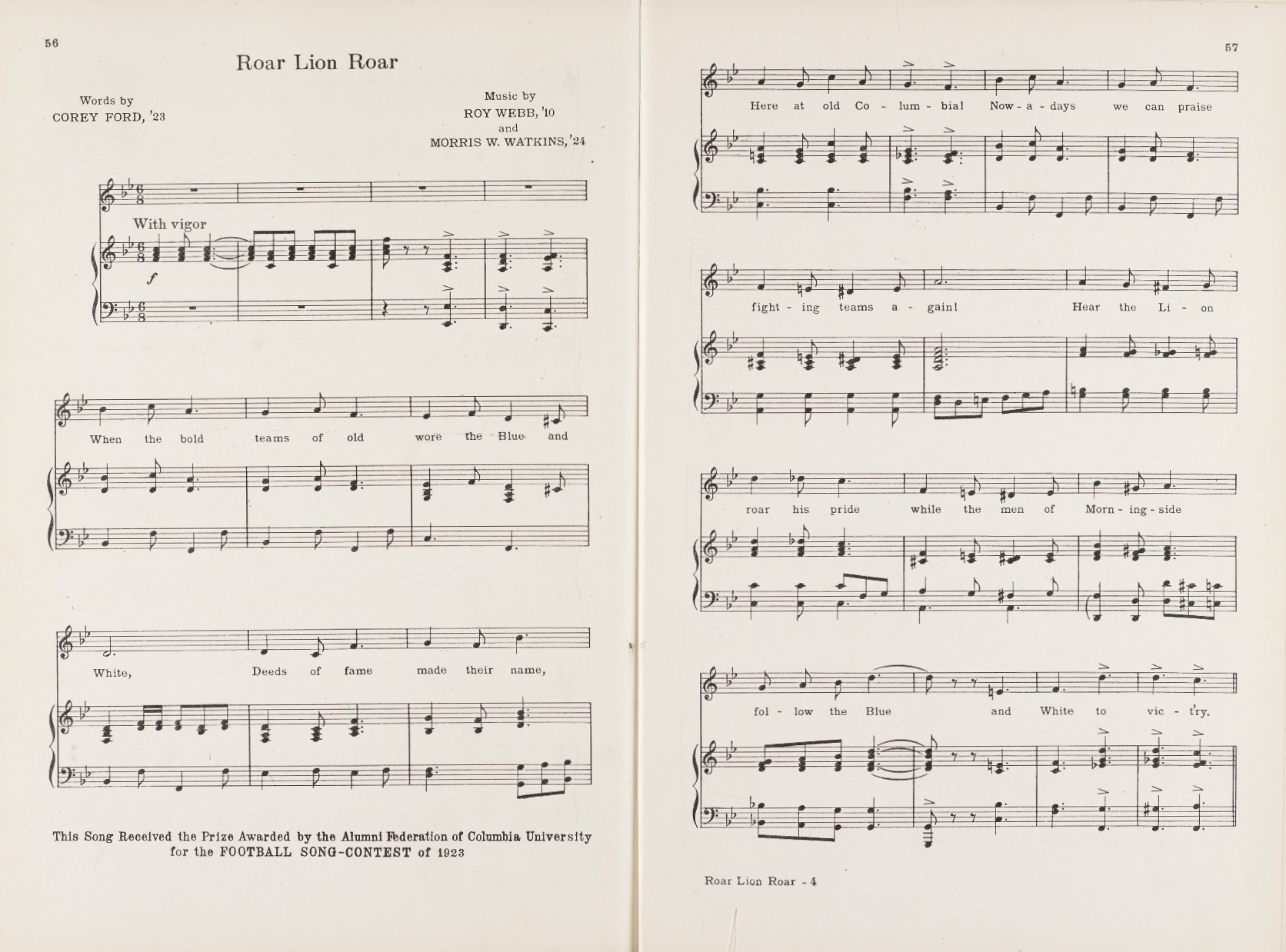
The original score for Roar, Lion, Roar from 1923, written by Corey Ford, Roy Webb, and Morris W. Watkins

There are a number of songs associated with Columbia, most of which date back to the late nineteenth and early twentieth century. These include the university's alma mater and fight song, among others.

=== "Stand, Columbia" ===
"Stand, Columbia" is the Columbia's alma mater. Its lyrics were written by Gilbert Oakley Ward in 1902, and is sung to the tune of Joseph Haydn's "Gott erhalte Franz den Kaiser." It is traditionally played at the university's baccalaureate services and commencements.

=== "Sans Souci" ===
"Sans Souci" is the alma mater of Columbia College. Written by Percy Fridenburg around 1888, it was based on a German drinking song, its first two stanzas being translations from the German while the third was an original addition by Fridenburg. Having long served as the entire university's alma mater in an unofficial capacity, it was officially adopted by the college in 1949.

=== "Roar, Lion, Roar" ===
"Roar, Lion, Roar" is the primary fight song for the Columbia Lions. Its lyrics were written by Corey Ford, while the music was composed by Morris W. Watkins and Roy Webb. It was originally written for the 1923 Varsity Show, Half Moon Inn, and is often sung at sporting events.
