= Roy Waldo Miner =

American marine biologist (1875–1955)

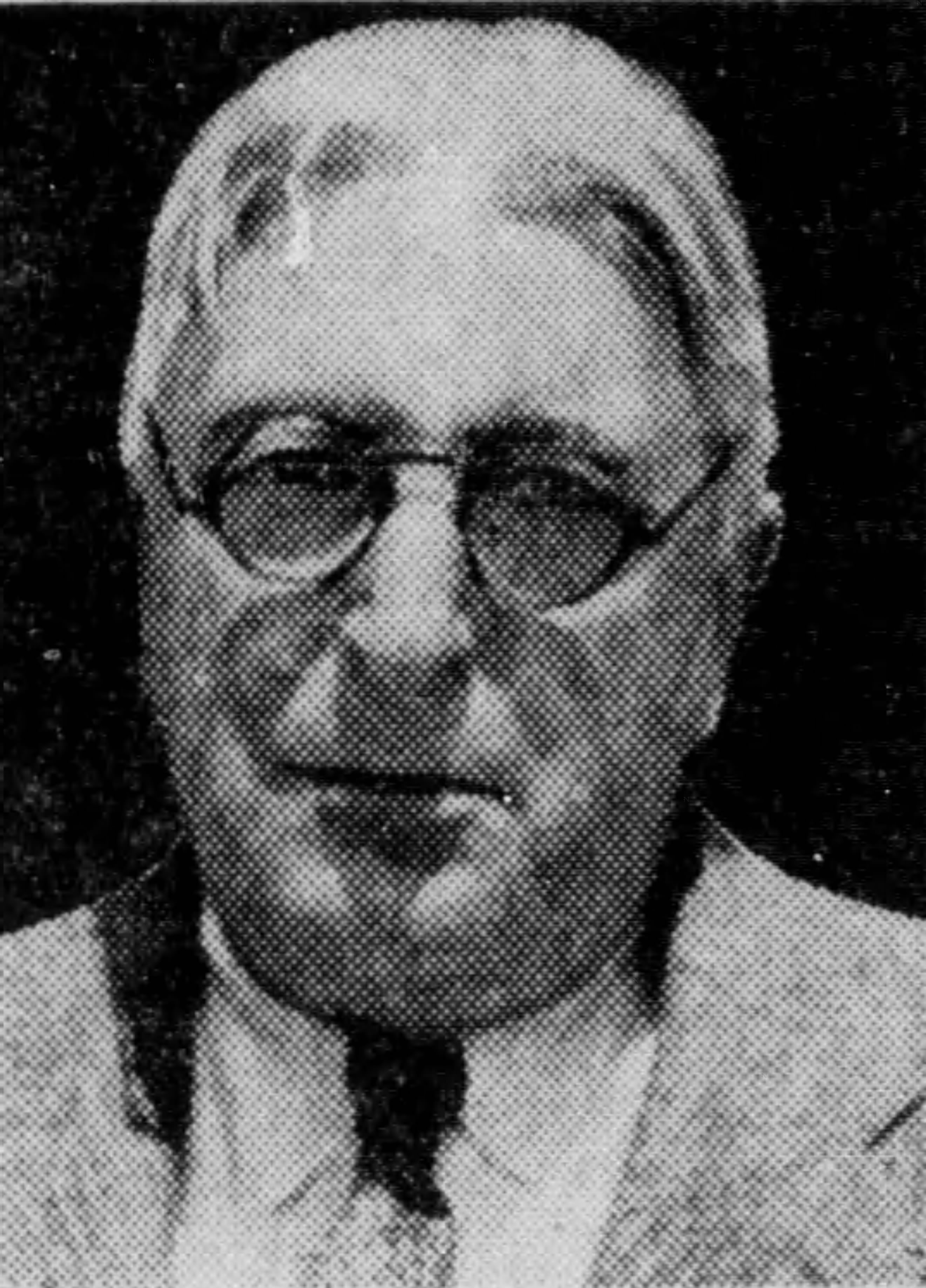
- Waldo c. 1936
- Born: February 24, 1875; North Adams, Massachusetts, US
- Died: December 13, 1955 (aged 80); Stonington, Connecticut, US
- Education: Williams College; General Theological Seminary; Columbia University
- Spouse: Eunice Thomas Miner
- Children: Dorothy Eugenia Miner; Dwight C. Miner
- Scientific career
- Fields: Marine biology; exhibit design
- Workplaces: American Museum of Natural History

Roy Waldo Miner (February 24, 1875 – December 13, 1955) was an American naturalist and marine biologist who developed museum exhibits and publications related to marine life, including coral reefs and the marine coastal ecosystems of New England. He joined the American Museum of Natural History in 1905 and was curator of living invertebrates and marine life from 1922 to 1943.

Miner applied and improved on the relatively novel approach of displaying multiple species together in realistic dioramas that demonstrated relationships and interactions between species. He conducted field research trips with a team of museum artists to gather zoological specimens, take photographs, and compile detailed notes, sketches, and paintings, then directed preparation of exhibits that included accurate biological illustrations and wax and glass models.

Miner led five expeditions to the Andros Barrier Reef in the Bahamas in the 1920s–1930s and oversaw construction of the two-story-tall Andros coral reef diorama in the Milstein Hall of Ocean Life at the American Museum of Natural History. For this project, Miner used an early approach to underwater photography and film, along with extracting an estimated 40 tons of coral from the reef. He also led research and preparation for a diorama of pearl divers in the Cook Islands and many dioramas and models of U.S. East Coast saltwater and freshwater life.

Miner was a member of the New York Academy of Sciences, led by his wife and collaborator Eunice Thomas Miner, and served as its editor of publications after his retirement from the museum.

== Early life and education ==
Roy Waldo Miner was born on February 24, 1875, in North Adams, Massachusetts. He received a Bachelor of Arts degree from Williams College in Massachusetts in 1897 and graduated from the General Theological Seminary in New York City in 1900. At Williams, he was a member of Phi Beta Kappa. He later completed a Doctor of Philosophy degree at Columbia University in 1923 with a dissertation about the extinct amphibian Eryops.

== Career ==
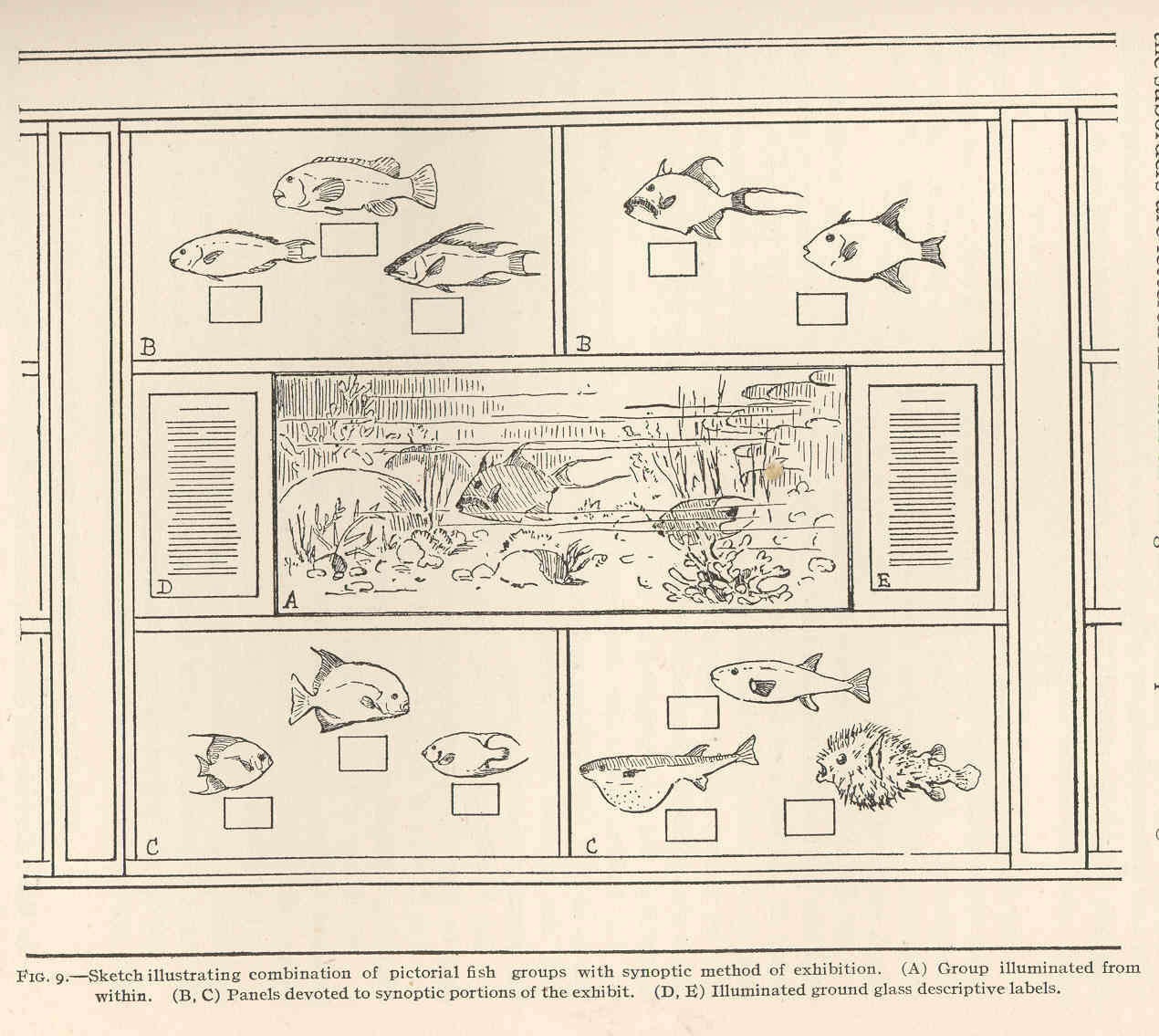
Sketch of a synoptic display about fishes from a paper Miner wrote in 1908

Although he had graduated from General Theological Seminary, Miner decided to become a teacher instead of a clergyman, teaching biology and Latin at the Berkeley Carroll School in New York City from 1900 to 1904. He was associate headmaster of the Kelvin School from 1904. to 1905.

Miner joined the American Museum of Natural History in 1905 as assistant curator of the invertebrate zoology department. He was promoted to associate curator in 1917 and curator in 1922. Miner was curator of marine life, lower invertebrates and living invertebrates until he retired in 1943.

In his 38 years with the museum, he worked on scientific research and preparation of exhibits. His goals included improving public understanding of evolution. He was one of the first scientists to use the term "marine ecology". He made major contributions to the Hall of Ocean Life and the Darwin Hall of Invertebrate Zoology, which was absorbed into the Hall of Ocean Life in 1948. He repeatedly visited research sites, including coastal New England and the coral reefs of the Caribbean and South Pacific, to gather information and specimens for accurate illustrations and reconstructions in exhibits. He published books, magazine articles, journal articles, and pamphlets about natural history, including articles in Scientific American and National Geographic. He also gave public lectures about his research expeditions.

Miner worked closely with skilled museum artists in the Department of Installation and Preparation, such as glassblower Herman O. Mueller, wax modeler and painter Chris E. Olsen, and artist-biologist George H. Childs. Miner said that Mueller was the "most wonderful glass blower in the world". Additional collaborators included entomologist and modeler Ignaz Matausch, colorist and modeler Show Shimotori, and colorist Worthington H. Southwick.

=== U.S. East Coast saltwater and freshwater life ===
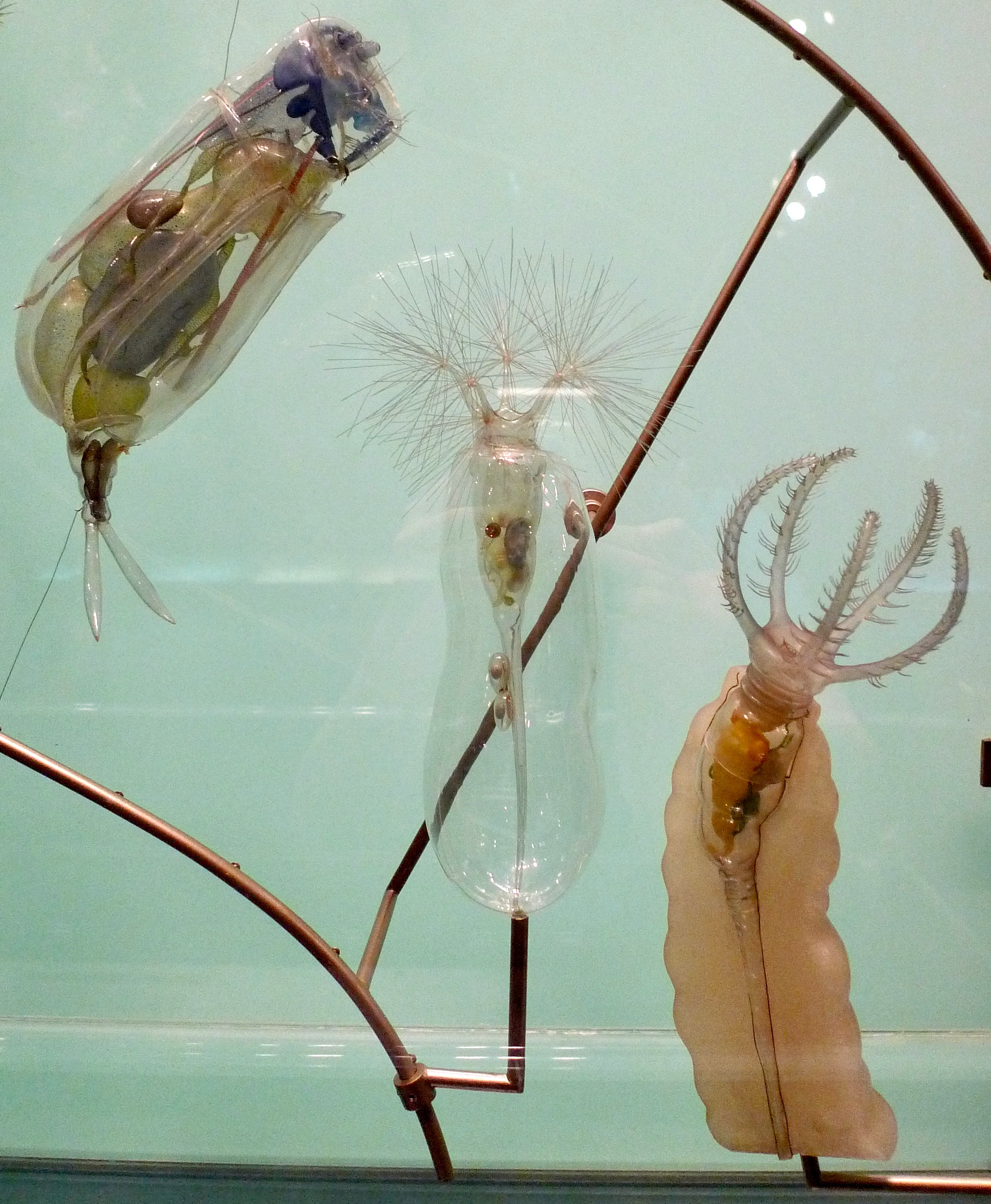
Glass models of rotifers made by Mueller under Miner's direction, on display in 2010

Miner researched marine coastal ecosystems between Massachusetts and New Brunswick in the 1910s and 1920s. He observed wharf piles and tide pools in New England, and he and Mueller conducted a biological survey of Passamaquoddy Bay in the Bay of Fundy, New Brunswick. Working with taxidermist George Dwight Franklin, they also collected many marine invertebrates in Massachusetts, and they returned with Olsen and Shimotori to gather materials for a Bryozoa Group exhibit. This research informed several museum displays including models of invertebrates and dioramas of the sea floor.

Miner worked with Mueller and other artists to teach museum visitors about microscopic organisms by scaling them up to visible size. One noted exhibit, the Rotifer Group (1928), was a model of a cubic half inch of pond water magnified 100 times, showing interactions between rotifers, spirogyra algae, water fleas, and protozoa, all made of glass and wax. This exhibit was based on field studies they did in New Jersey and Maine. Mueller had to develop new glassblowing techniques to build intricate models of rotifers, radiolarians, jellyfish, and many other animals.

After retirement from the museum, Miner published the Field Book of Seashore Life (1950), a guide to intertidal marine invertebrates from Nova Scotia to Beaufort, North Carolina. In a review, marine biologist Joel Hedgpeth said "Never before in such a comparatively small, convenient volume, has there been so much valuable information", although he noted some outdated nomenclature.

=== Caribbean and South Pacific ocean life ===
==== Andros Barrier Reef, The Bahamas ====
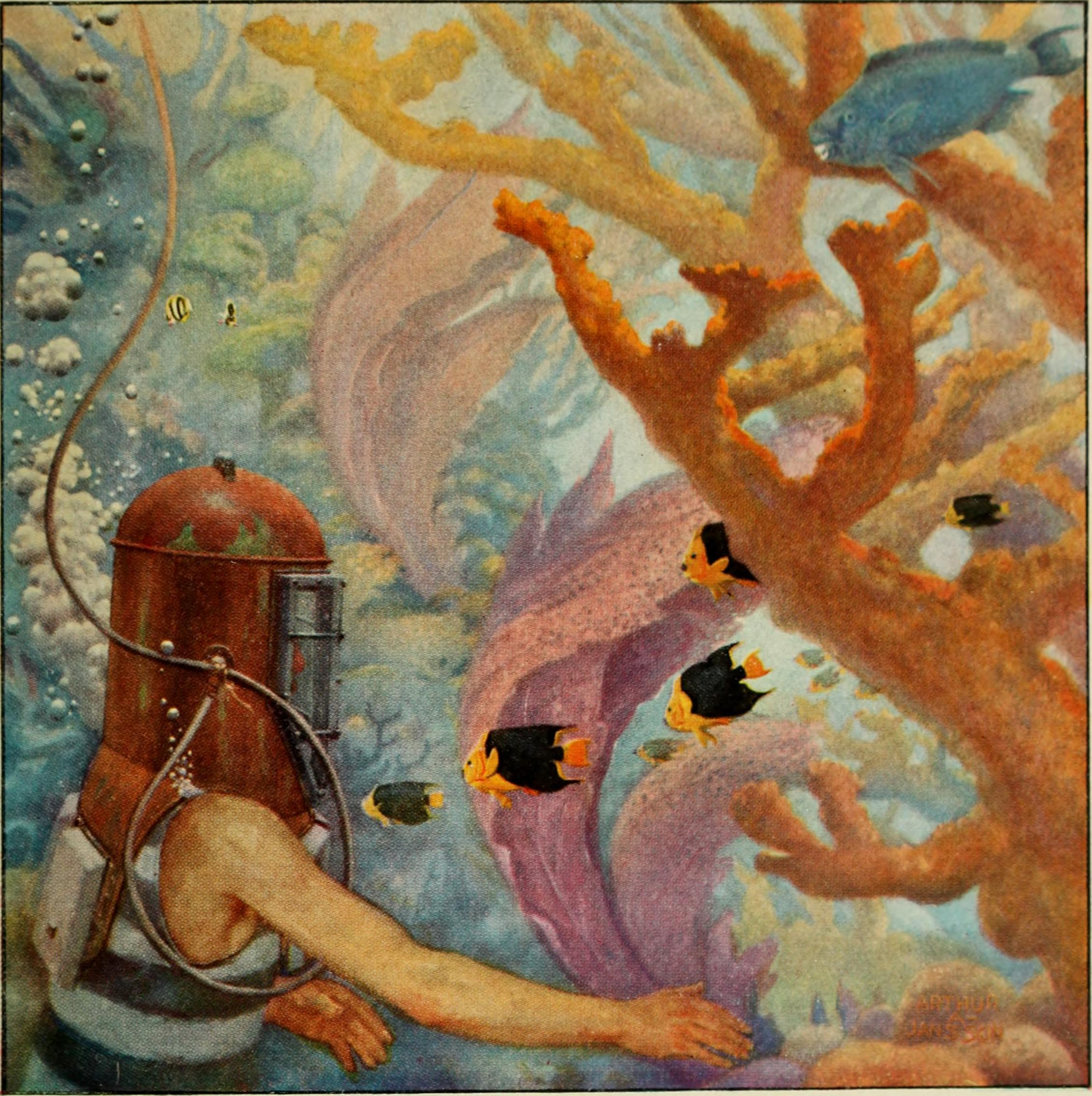
Illustration of Miner from his pamphlet Diving in Coral Gardens (1933)

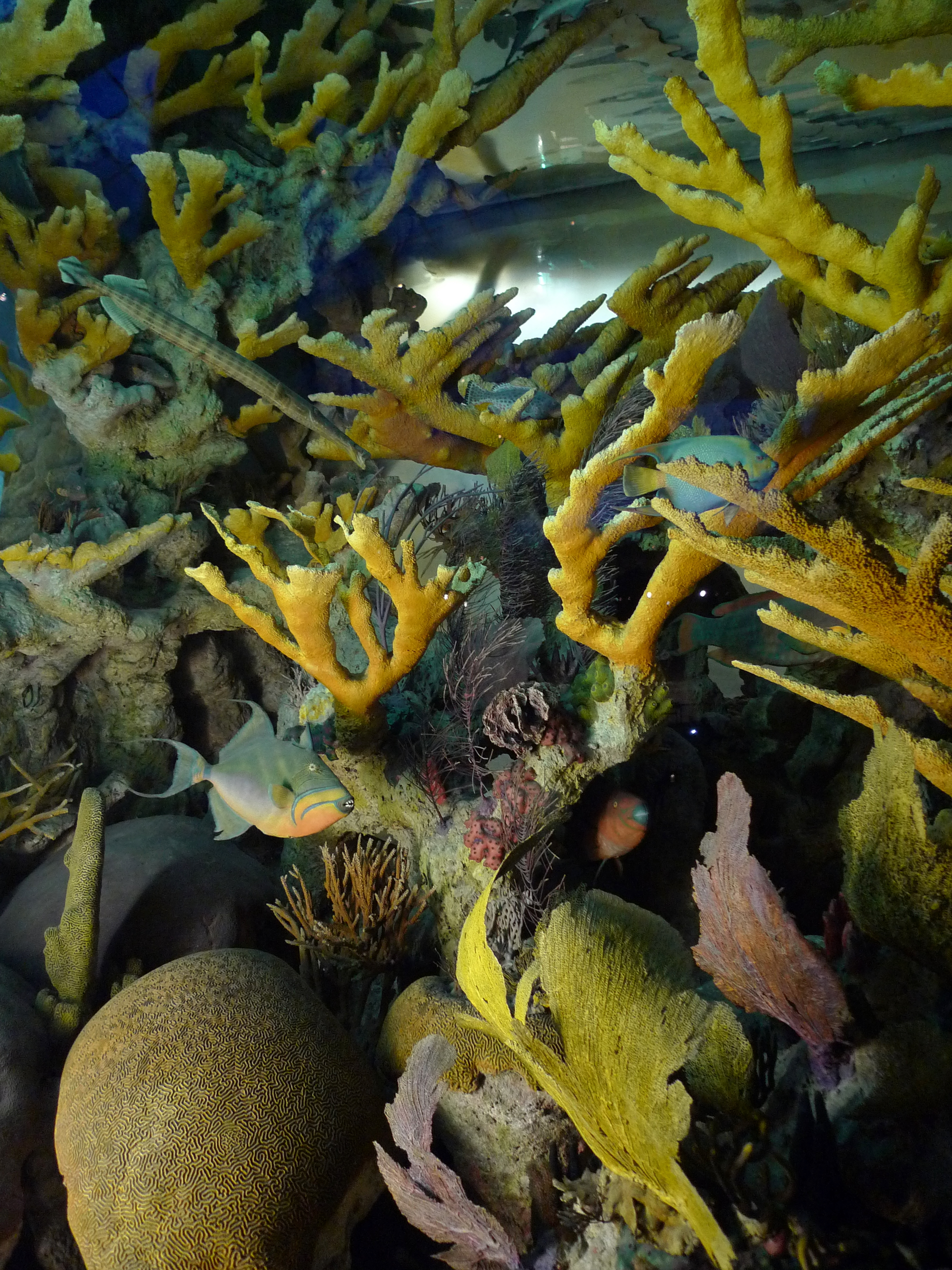
Detail from lower part of Bahaman coral reef diorama in 2010

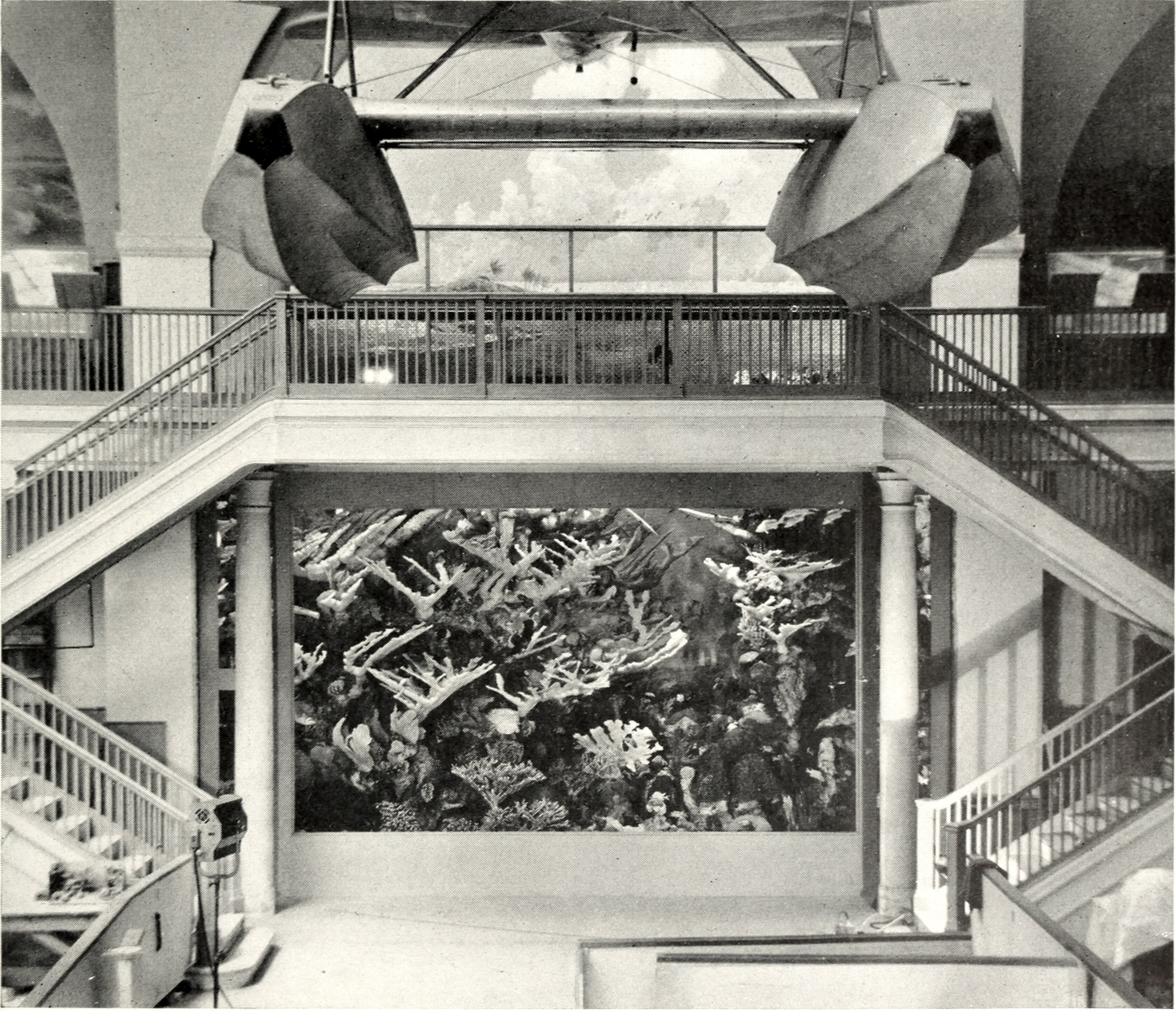
Completed Bahaman coral reef diorama in 1935

As part of the design for a new wing of the museum dedicated to ocean life, Miner planned a diorama to demonstrate the diverse life in a tropical coral reef. He may have been inspired by Charles Darwin's 1842 book The Structure and Distribution of Coral Reefs. He led five field expeditions to the Andros Barrier Reef in Andros, The Bahamas, between 1923 and 1933, accompanied by museum artists, to gather specimens, photographs, film footage, paintings, and notes for building the diorama. The expeditions were conducted in coordination with the colonial Bahaman government, including governor Bede Clifford.

Miner and his team used novel techniques for underwater photography and film, slightly earlier than William Beebe and his Bathysphere. The 1924 expedition was the first scientific expedition to use the Williamson Submarine Tube, working with the head of the Submarine Film Company, John Ernest Williamson. Attached to the bottom of a boat, the large hollow tube had a spherical observation chamber with a glass window (the "photosphere"), where Miner and the artists photographed, filmed, and painted the coral reef. This technique helped them create one of "the first substantial museum exhibits of the underwater realm"; Williamson also supported development of a Bahaman coral exhibit at Chicago's Field Museum of Natural History in 1929.

The team removed an estimated 40 tons of coral from the reef, bleached the pieces, and packed them into crates to take to the museum to build the diorama. The corals included elkhorn, staghorn, and fan corals. To select pieces of coral, Miner observed from the chamber and directed Williamson, who was in the water wearing a diving helmet, to attach a chain to specific pieces, which were then hoisted up. The largest piece of coral was 12 feet long and weighed about two tons. They did not need to use the dynamite they brought. Olsen and Childs painted the living corals from the chamber so the team could reconstruct the colors after killing the corals by removing them from the water.

Miner and the artists also wore diving helmets to descend into the water and observe the coral reef. Air was pumped into the helmet through a hose attached to their boat; scuba had not been developed yet. Olsen painted scenery underwater by applying oil paints with a palette knife to an oiled canvas on a glass panel. Miner filmed fish underwater with hand-cranked movie cameras in water-tight boxes but found it challenging to get good footage. Members of the expedition also caught fish from the boat, sketched them in color, and made plaster molds for casting beeswax models of the fish.

Completed in 1935, the Andros coral reef diorama took 12 years to research and build, and it cost about US$100,000 (equivalent to $2,360,000 in 2025). During construction, it was described as "unprecedented...by far the most ambitious ever attempted and involved entirely new problems in museum mounting." It was cleaned and received new lighting in 2003, and it remains on display in the Milstein Hall of Ocean Life. On the upper level, visitors look down through a sheet of glass as if looking from a boat; on the lower level, they see the reef as if standing on the bottom of the ocean. Art historian Ann Elias wrote in her book Coral Empire in 2019:

If standing on the floor above, [visitors] see a familiar terrestrial view looking out across a picturesque sea to islands and shorelines...To see the diorama from below is to witness a seething tangle of coral branches, rocky caverns and grottos, hidden spaces, strange animals, and dangerous potential. It shows a world that humans do not belong to, and seem unwelcome in.

Since 1935, the Andros Barrier Reef has substantially degraded due to human activities, including overfishing and ocean warming related to climate change, which has caused coral bleaching and other damage. Scientists can study the museum's coral specimens and compare them to living reefs to learn about the impacts of environmental issues with coral reefs. In 2003, a museum staff member said that the diorama "could never be duplicated now", both because the reef has declined and because museum curators no longer consider it acceptable to remove coral from reefs to create exhibits. Miner has been criticized for taking a substantial amount of living coral, such as by scholar Petra Löffler in 2021:

Miner celebrates the appropriation of 40 tons of coral material as a scientific achievement staged in a way that appeals to the public. In this undertaking, the field, the lab, the museum, and the archive as the main places of doing science in the Western world are closely tied in a network of appropriation and knowledge production.

==== Cook Islands pearl divers ====
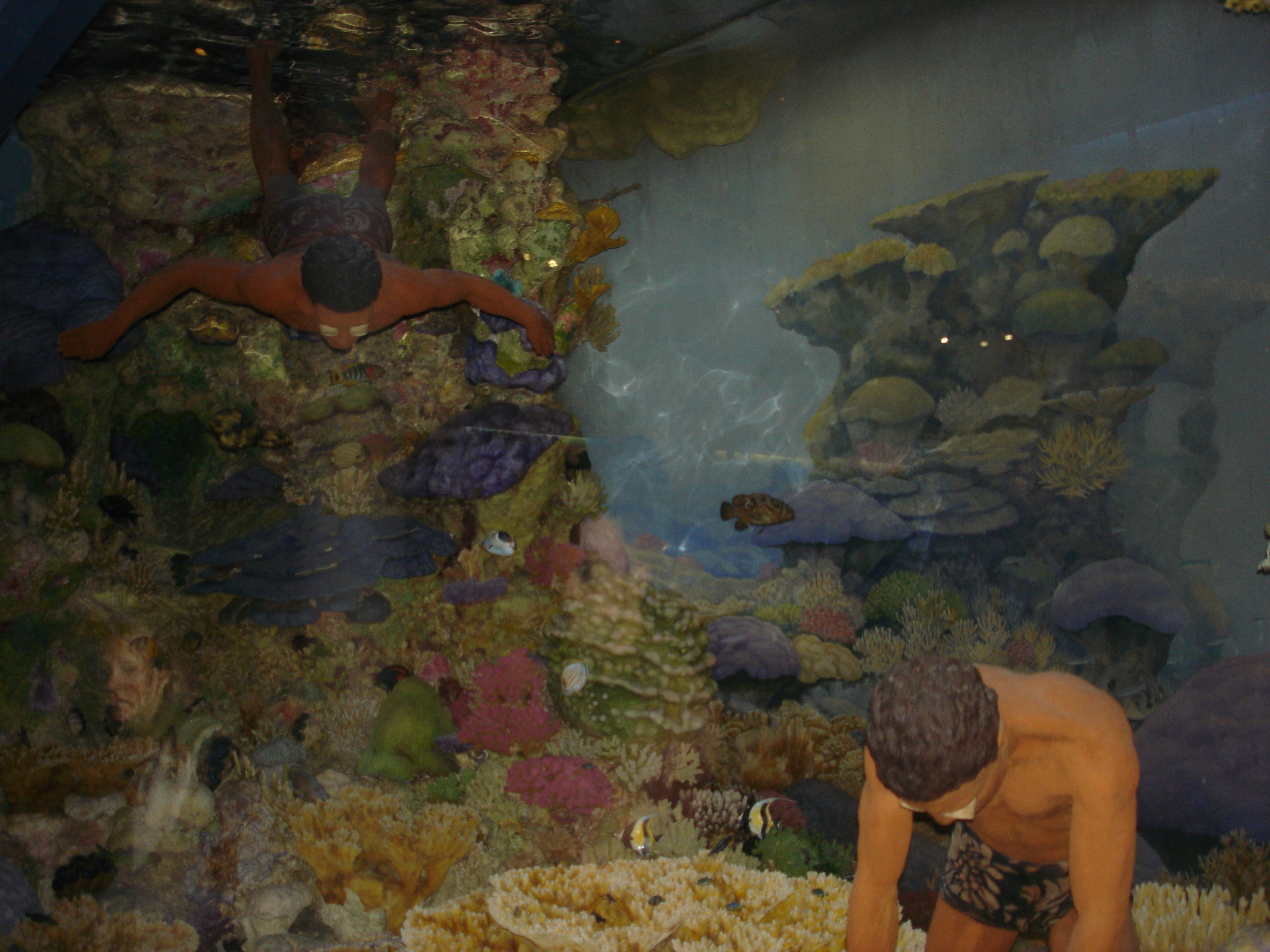
Detail from pearl divers diorama in 2009

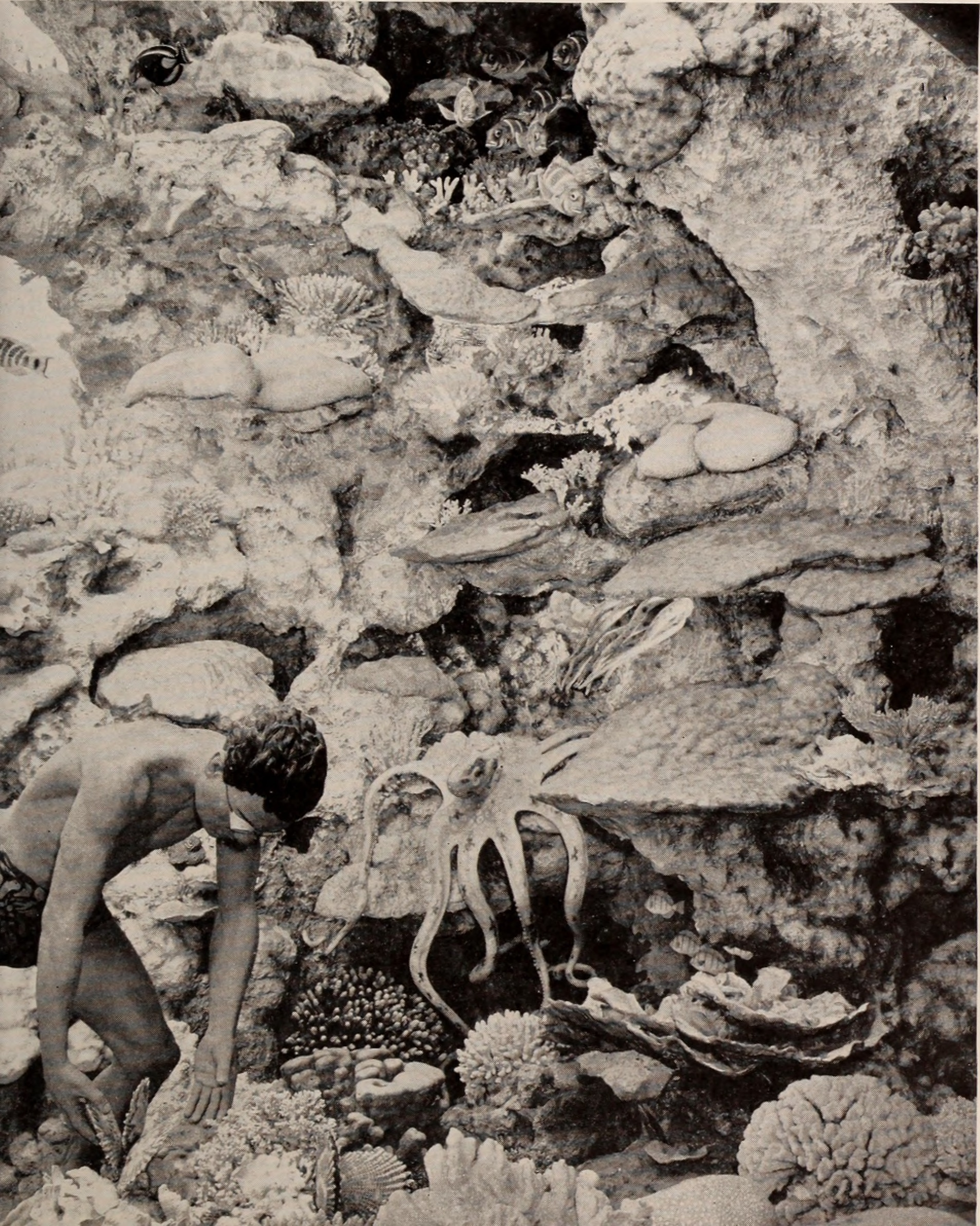
The diorama in 1945

After completing the Andros diorama, Miner developed a smaller diorama to demonstrate delicate Pacific coral reef structures in contrast with the large Atlantic corals of the Bahamas. To gather observations and specimens for the new project, he led an expedition funded by Templeton Crocker, a wealthy patron of science, who provided use of his yacht Zaca. Between 1936 and 1937, the expedition group visited Samoa, Christmas Island, and Tongareva, spending most of their time on Tongareva (Penrhyn), a coral atoll in the Cook Islands.

Miner decided that the diorama would show two Tongarevan pearl divers hunting for pearl oysters on the sea floor in the lagoon at the center of the atoll. The group, assisted by Tongarevans, removed an estimated ten tons of coral from the reef to build the exhibit. Miner worked with Chris E. Olsen to paint the diorama background, George H. Childs to make fish models based on casts from the expedition, and Worthington H. Southwick to color the corals, among other artists. The life-sized people were sculpted with tortoiseshell goggles, worn by divers to protect their eyes. The exhibit was completed in 1941 and renovated in 2003.

A 1945 museum publication described the people in the diorama as going "about their work despite the dangers evidenced by the large shark swimming in the background, by the octopus lurking near the entrance of a near-by cave, and by the scarlet sixteen-rayed sea-star with its hundreds of poisonous sharp spines which is lying under the giant spiral mass of the acropore coral in the center of the group." Art historian Ann Elias called this diorama an "unsettling, eerie encounter with the underwater" and an "intense, primitivizing vision of the undersea". The exhibit remains on display in the Milstein Hall of Ocean Life.

The public had an appetite for undersea adventure at the time, influenced by underwater science fiction films such as 20,000 Leagues Under the Sea (1916), which was made using the same Williamson Submarine Tube that Miner used for Andros expeditions. Miner gave public lectures about the Tongareva expedition that included stories about "undersea dangers" such as encountering octopuses and sharks. In a book about pioneers of underwater diving, marine biologist Trevor Norton described Miner as a lesser-known contemporary of William Beebe, a naturalist with the New York Zoological Society who gained significant media attention by leading and publicizing research expeditions including deep-sea dives in the Bathysphere in Bermuda in the 1930s.

=== Professional associations ===
Miner served as president of the New York Academy of Sciences in 1940–1941. After his retirement from the museum in 1943, he volunteered as the editor of publications for the New York Academy of Sciences for 12 years. He was also a fellow of the American Association for the Advancement of Science.

== Personal life ==
Miner married Anna Elizabeth Carroll in 1903. Their children were art historian Dorothy Eugenia Miner, history professor Dwight C. Miner, Roy Waldo Miner Jr., and a son who died in infancy. Anna died when she was struck by a car in 1924.

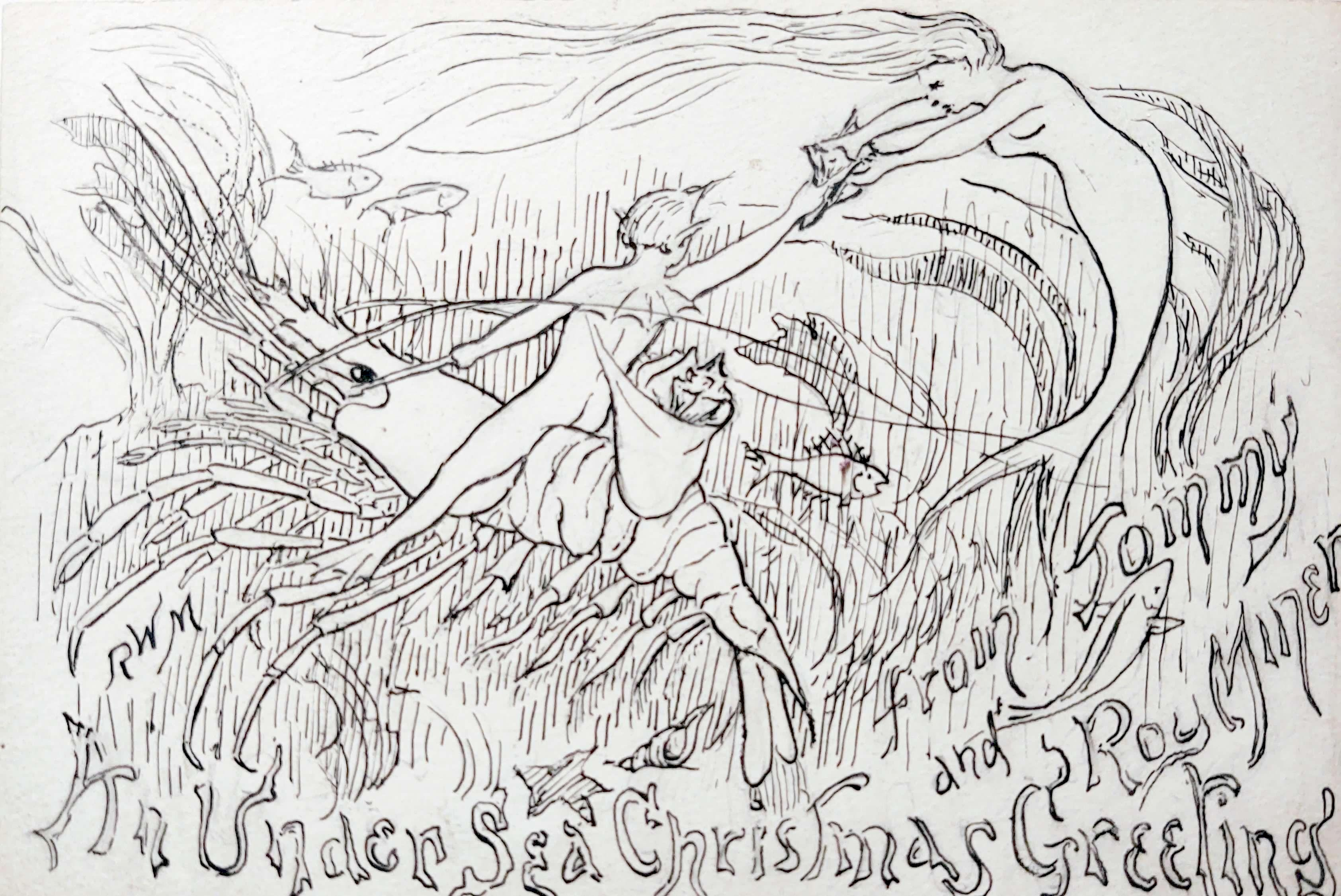
"Under Sea Christmas Greeting from Tommy and Roy Miner", drawn by Miner

Miner married Eunice Thomasina Thomas in 1926. Eunice, known as Tommy, was a biologist who led the New York Academy of Sciences from 1939 to 1967 and revitalized the organization. They hosted academy events in their home in New York City. Tommy joined some of Miner's research expeditions, where she participated in coral reef dives and took photographs of people and industries in the Bahamas for the museum. They experienced the 1926 Nassau hurricane together and documented some of the damage on the island.

The family had a summer home in Stonington, Connecticut, a historic house built in the early 1800s. Miner's ancestors included Thomas Minor, a New England colonist who helped establish Stonington.

Miner died at age 80 on December 13, 1955, in Stonington. In Miner's obituary in Science, zoologist Horace W. Stunkard described him as "a meticulous scholar, a fine gentleman, and a loyal friend".

== Archives ==
Tommy donated the family's collection of research photographs and film to the Patricia and Phillip Frost Museum of Science in Miami, Florida. Made between the 1920s and 1940s, the collection includes more than 4500 glass slides and negatives with subjects including "folklore and ethnography of islands in the Caribbean; scientific expeditions to the Bahamas, the South Pacific, and Puerto Rico among others; and, significantly, underwater photography."

== Selected publications ==
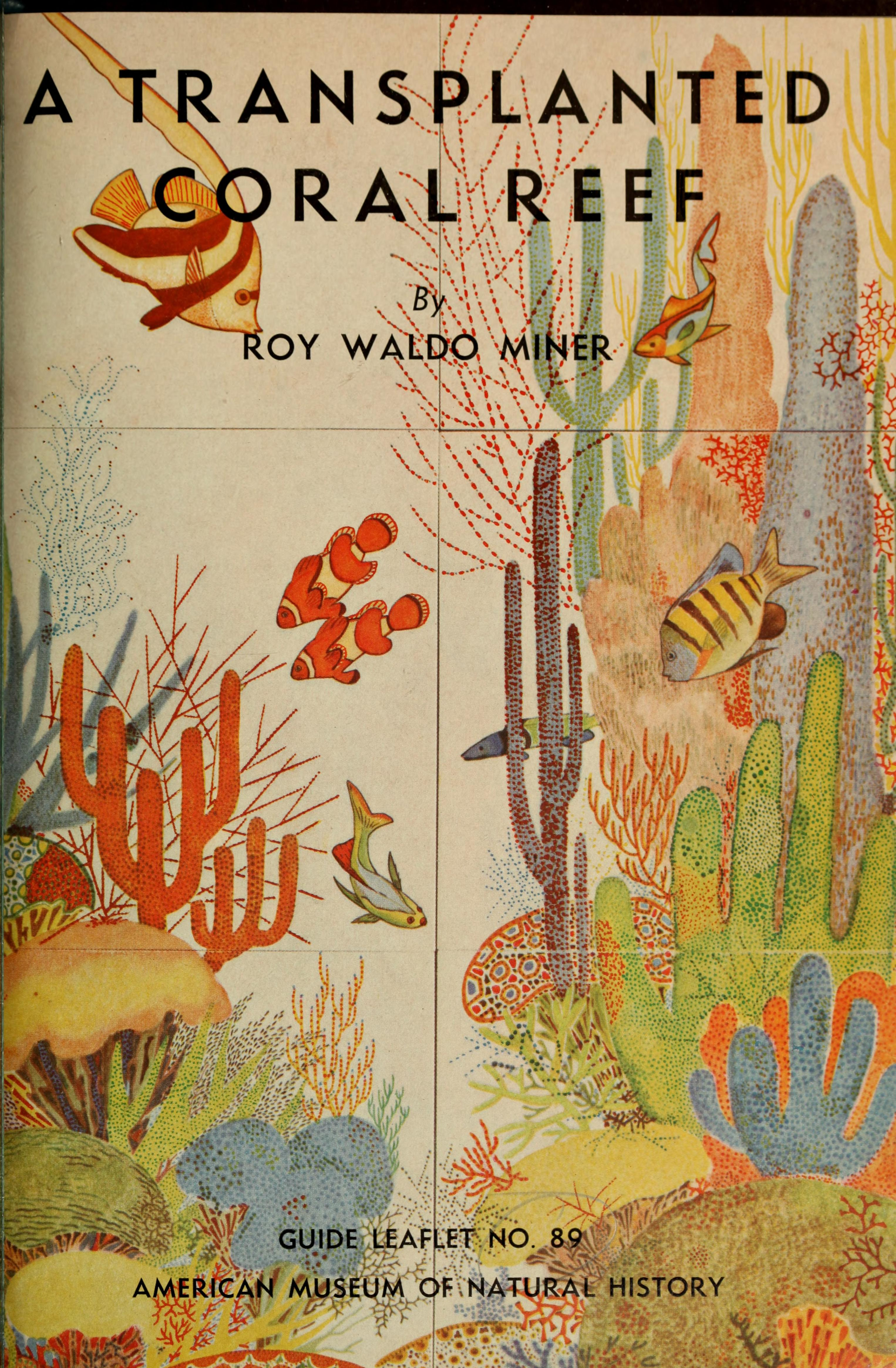
A Transplanted Coral Reef by Miner (1935), cover illustrated by W. H. Southwick

New England coast:

- Outposts of the Sea: Animals of the Tidal Zone. Guide Leaflet Series No. 74. American Museum of Natural History. 1929.
- The Kingdom of the Tides. Guide Leaflet Series No. 83. American Museum of Natural History. 1934.
- Field Book of Seashore Life. G. P. Putnam's Sons. 1950.

Coral reefs:

- Forty Tons of Coral. Guide Leaflet Series No. 78. American Museum of Natural History. 1933. Also published in abridged form in Scientific American.
- Diving in Coral Gardens. Guide Leaflet Series No. 80. American Museum of Natural History. 1933. Also published in abridged form in Scientific American.
- A Transplanted Coral Reef. Guide Leaflet Series No. 89. American Museum of Natural History. 1935.
- Pearl Divers. Guide Leaflet Series No. 104. American Museum of Natural History. 1941.

Lists of works:

- Miner, Roy Waldo, 1875–1955 – Biodiversity Heritage Library
- Miner, Roy Waldo, 1875–1955 – American Museum of Natural History archives

== See also ==
- AMNH Exhibitions Lab
- Glass sea creatures – scientific models made between 1863 and 1880 by Leopold and Rudolf Blaschka
- Natural history museum § Changing organization
