= Eunice Thomas Miner =

American administrator and advocate for science (1899–1993)

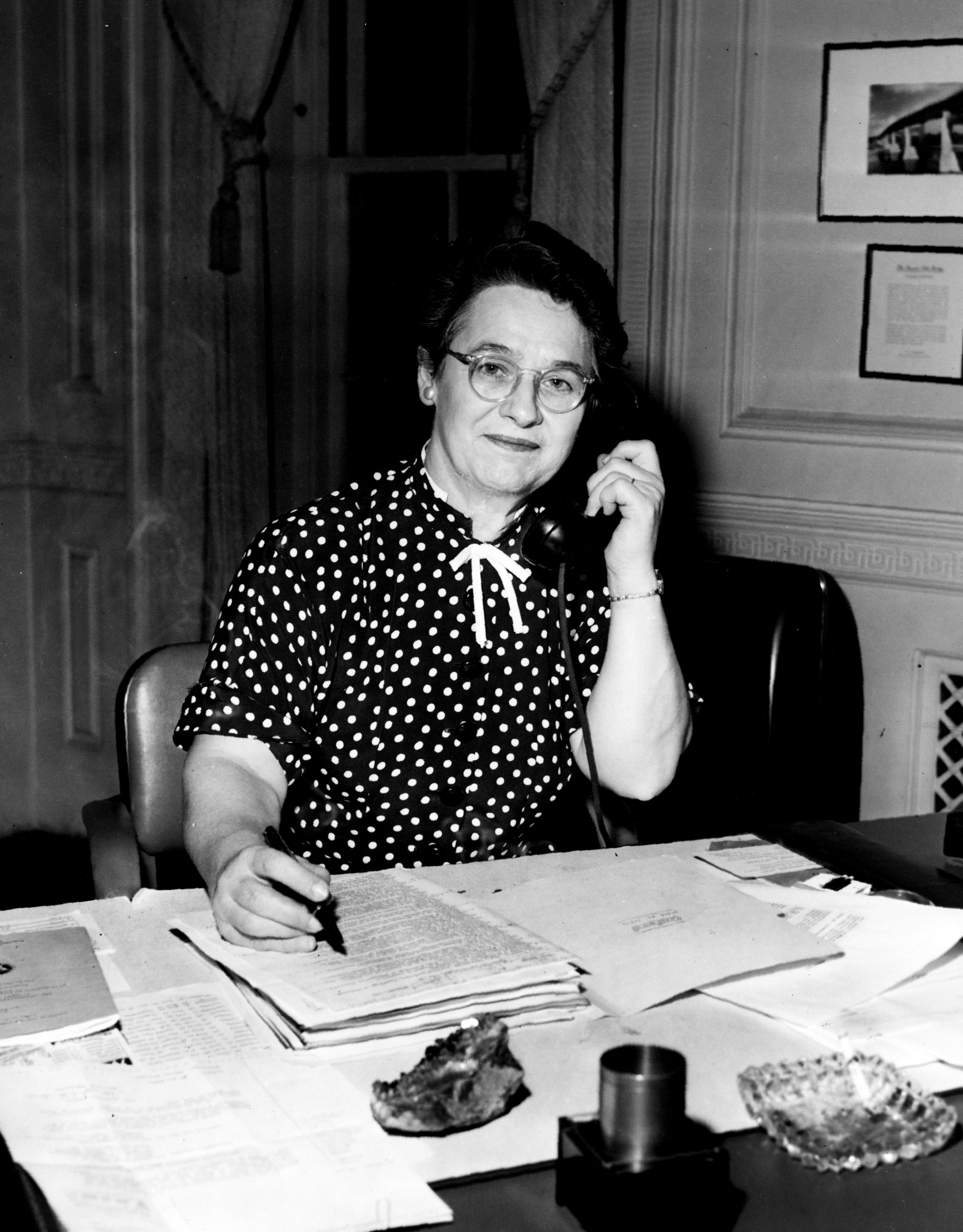
- Eunice Thomasina Thomas Miner-Director of the New York Academy of Sciences
- Born: August 9, 1899; West Virginia, US
- Died: March 18, 1993 (aged 93); Boynton Beach, Palm Beach, Florida, US
- Other name: Tommy Miner
- Education: Boston University
- Spouse: Roy Waldo Miner
- Scientific career
- Workplaces: New York Academy of Sciences

Eunice Thomasina Thomas Miner (August 8, 1899 – March 18, 1993), affectionately called "Tommy," was the executive director of the New York Academy of Sciences from 1939 to 1967. She oversaw the revitalization of the organization and secured a new donated headquarters from Norman Woolworth (brother of Frank Winfield Woolworth). She was an advocate for the support of science in public health causes, including collaborating with Hilary Koprowski to support polio vaccine work.

Miner joined the New York Academy of Sciences in 1935 when her work as a research assistant in the department of invertebrate biology at the American Museum of Natural History intersected with the Academy's Scientific Survey of Porto Rico and the Virgin Islands.

== Early life ==
Eunice Thomasina Thomas was born on August 8, 1899, in Everett, Middlesex, Massachusetts. Her parents were Frank Kent Thomas and Elizabeth R. Wilson, both who died early in the Middlesex County, Massachusetts area. She attended Boston University and graduated in 1925. She was married to Roy Waldo Miner, a curator of zoology at the American Museum of Natural History, on June 23, 1926, in North Adams, Berkshire, Massachusetts. He was a former president of the New York Academy of Sciences.

== Career ==
Miner served as the director of the Marine Historical Museum, a board member of the International Foundation for Sciences, director of the National Paraplegia Fund, and many different administrative roles at the New York Academy of Sciences. She was appointed to the position of executive secretary of the New York Academy of Sciences in October 1939 by the scientific council of the academy. Her first efforts as the executive secretary were to conduct a series of membership drives which, according to Simon Baatz, the success of which "relied more heavily on a gregarious nature than on the scientific merits of the organization."

By 1948, the membership of the academy was at 4,000 and required the academy to find a new home outside of the two rooms provided as meeting space by the American Museum of Natural History. The academy launched a $1,000,000 fund drive for the purchase of a new home. Part of Miner's responsibilities in the fundraising campaign included soliciting donations from wealthy philanthropists including Normal Woolworth. Woolworth was "so impressed by Miner's eloquence, energy, and enthusiasm that, upon learning of the Academy search for a new home, simply donated his mansion with the sole requirement that the Academy pay all the necessary legal fees involved in the transfer." While Miner was successful in securing the academy a new home, there is little evidence that the academy was successful in raising $1,000,000. However, the campaign did raise enough funds to refurbish the Woolworth house which was donated to the academy as a $1,000,000 gift in 1948. These updates allowed the academy to thrive as a central meeting place in the New York scientific community for special events and conferences.

Miner retired as executive director of the New York Academy of Sciences in 1967. At the time of her retirement, the academy held a special symposium to honor her great achievements for the institution at the annual meeting. The academy cited her as the source of the increase in membership from 350 members in 1939 to more than 26,000 by 1967.

== Personal life ==
Among her many friends was the renowned anthropologist Margaret Mead, whom she met while both women were working as research assistants at the American Museum of Natural History. During her retirement years, she moved to Florida. She died on March 18, 1993, in Florida.
