= Dorothy Miner (attorney) =

American lawyer (1936–2008)

- Born: Dorothy Marie Miner; August 14, 1936; Manhattan, New York, United States
- Died: October 21, 2008 (aged 72); Morningside Heights, Manhattan, United States
- Education: Smith College; Columbia University
- Occupation: Attorney
- Employer: New York City Landmarks Preservation Commission
- Spouse: James Edward O'Driscoll (m. 1970-1993)
- Parent: Dwight C. Miner (father)
- Relatives: Dorothy Miner (aunt)

Dorothy Marie Miner (August 14, 1936 – October 21, 2008) was an American attorney. Miner was known for work as chief counsel for the New York City Landmarks Preservation Commission.

== Career ==
Born in Manhattan, Miner earned a Bachelor of Arts in History from Smith College in 1958. Her honors thesis was on the Tudor period and was titled "The Demands of the Tudor Rebels." She then continued on to receive a Juris Doctor from Columbia Law School in 1961, and a Master of Science in Urban Planning from Columbia, as well, in 1972.

A year later, Miner was named as counsel to the New York City Landmarks Preservation Commission. Her work there helped to create a legal process for landmark designations in the city, as part of the National Historic Preservation Act of 1966. Miner played a major role in presenting the case in Penn Central Transportation Co. v. New York City of 1978, in which the Supreme Court of the United States upheld the ability of the city to restrict development of Grand Central Terminal based on its landmark designation. The Penn Central company had argued that the development restrictions were unconstitutional and in conflict in terms of the Fifth Amendment to the United States Constitution and eminent domain. Miner left the commission in 1994, after her resignation was requested by Jennifer Raab.

Upon leaving the Commission, Miner accepted teaching positions at Columbia and at the Pace University School of Law.

== Personal life ==
Miner was born to Marie and Dwight C. Miner, professor of history at Columbia University. Her aunt of the same name, Dorothy Miner, was an art historian and first Keeper of Manuscripts of the Walters Art Museum. The Miner side of the family was of both British and Irish descent.

On June 25, 1970, Miner married James Edward O'Driscoll. Their marriage lasted until his death in 1993. Miner died in 2008 from complications of lung disease.

== See also ==
- List of Americans of Irish descent
- List of Columbia University people in politics, military and law
- List of Smith College people
