= Ignaz Matausch =

American sculptor

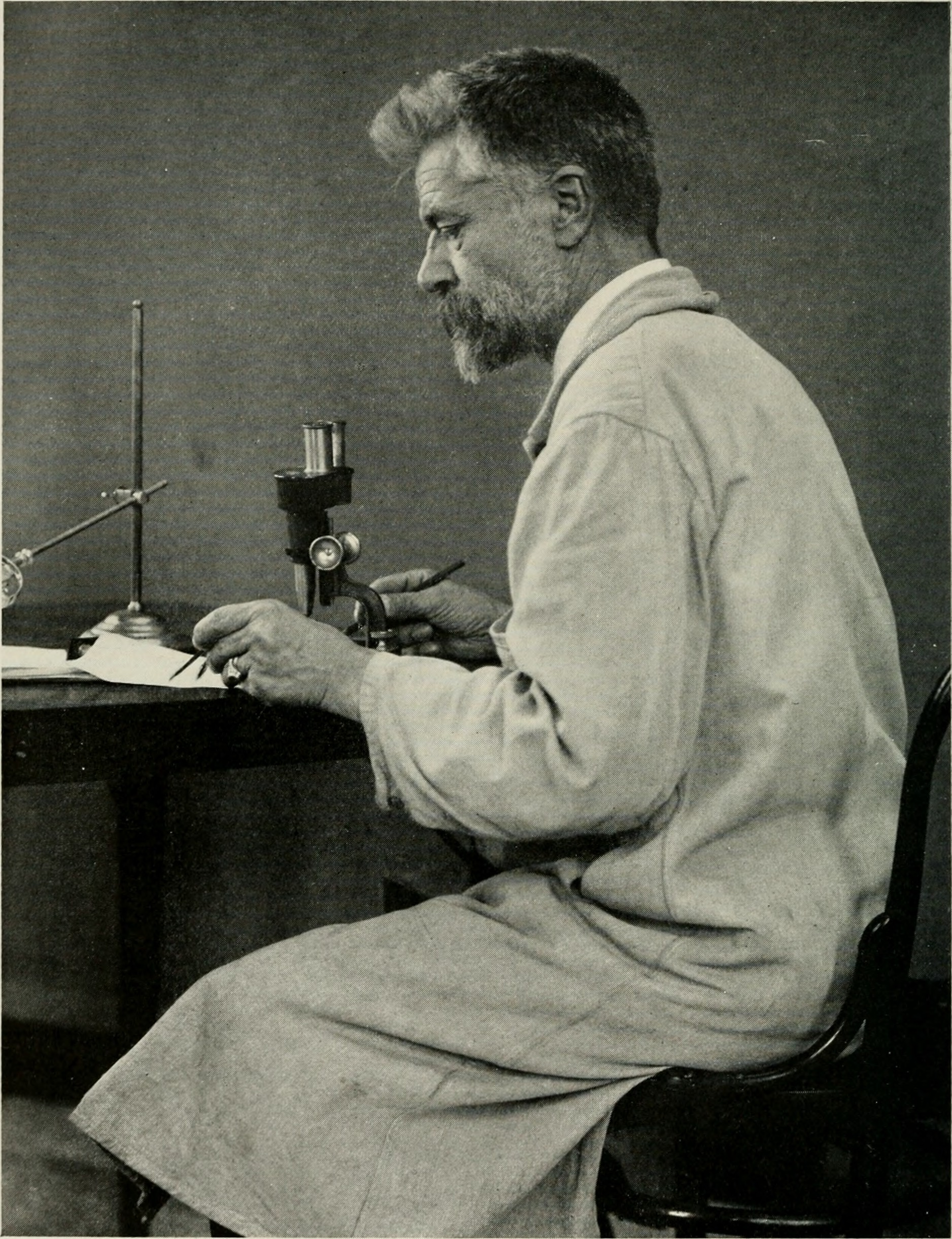
Matausch at work in 1915

Ignaz Matausch (September 1, 1859 – December 14, 1915) was an Austrian-American artist and entomologist known for his large-scale models of insects and other invertebrates at the American Museum of Natural History.

Matausch was born in České Budějovice, and trained as a model maker from an early age. He worked initially for the private museum of Duke Schwarzenburg. He emigrated to the United States in 1892 and resided in Cleveland, Ohio, until 1904, when he became a member of the modeling staff of the American Museum. He was known for his realistic large-scale models including the flea, house fly, and spider. The housefly exhibit, made "as big as a cat" (enlarged 40 times) was initially planned for the Hall of Public Health. It took a year to build and involved cutting up and examining nearly 200 specimens. It was the central exhibit when the hall was opened in April 1913. As an entomologist he focused on treehoppers (Membracidae), authoring eight papers on their biology. He also developed a technique of preserving spiders by supporting their abdomen with a piece of wood inside. He worked with curator of living invertebrates Roy Waldo Miner on dioramas and models for the Darwin Hall of Invertebrate Zoology.
