= Dwight C. Miner =

American historian and academic (1904–1978)

- Born: Dwight Carroll Miner; November 4, 1904; New York City, New York, United States
- Died: August 1, 1978 (aged 73); Ridgewood, New Jersey, United States
- Occupations: Historian; Educator
- Spouse: Marie
- Children: 3 (Dorothy, Richard, and Robert)
- Relatives: Dorothy Miner (twin sister)

Academic background
- Education: Columbia University
- Thesis: The Fight for the Panama Route: The Story of the Spooner Act and the Hay–Herrán Treaty (1940)

Academic work
- Discipline: History
- Sub-discipline: American history

Dwight Carroll Miner (November 4, 1904 – August 1, 1978) was an American historian and educator. Miner held the post of Moore Collegiate Professor of History at Columbia University.

== Career ==
Miner was born to Roy Waldo, who was curator of marine life at the American Museum of Natural History, and Anna Elizabeth Carroll. Miner was of British and Irish descent from his father's and mother's side, respectively. He was a fraternal twin with his sister, Dorothy Eugenia Miner, who became the first keeper of manuscripts at the Walters Art Museum. Born in New York City, he graduated from the local Horace Mann School in 1922. Miner then went on to receive all of his degrees from Columbia University: a Bachelor of Arts in 1926, Master of Arts in 1927, and Doctor of Philosophy in 1940. His doctoral dissertation studied the Spooner Act and the Hay–Herrán Treaty.

Upon completing his master's degree, Miner began teaching at Columbia as an instructor, and was promoted to the rank of professor in 1948.

In 1963, Miner read A Visit from St. Nicholas to Columbia students as part of the Yule Log, one of a handful of Columbia University traditions.

In 1965, he was given the Mark Van Doren Award for Teaching. A year later, Miner appeared on the cover of the May 6 issue of Time magazine as one of the top ten professors in the United States. A year later, his professorship was endowed and he became the Moore Collegiate Professor of History.

Miner retired from teaching at Columbia in 1973 and a scholarship fund was set up by his classmates in his honor.

Miner died of cancer in 1978 at the Valley Hospital in Ridgewood. His career papers are held in the Columbia University Libraries. A posthumous portrait of Miner was painted by Joyce Ballantyne in 1982 and is now in the National Portrait Gallery.

== Personal life ==
Miner and his wife Marie had a daughter, Dorothy Marie Miner, and two sons, Dr. Robert Dwight Miner and Richard Thomas Miner.

== See also ==
- List of Americans of Irish descent
- List of Columbia University alumni and attendees
- List of Horace Mann School alumni
