= Dorothy Miner (historian) =

American art historian (1904–1973)

- Born: Dorothy Eugenia Miner; November 4, 1904; New York City, New York, United States
- Died: May 12, 1973 (aged 68); Baltimore, Maryland, United States
- Occupations: Art historian Curator; Librarian
- Relatives: Dwight C. Miner (twin brother); Dorothy Miner (niece)

Academic background
- Education: Barnard College; Columbia University
- Doctoral advisor: Meyer Schapiro
- Influences: Belle da Costa Greene

Dorothy Eugenia Miner (November 4, 1904 – May 12, 1973) was an American art historian, curator, and librarian who was a scholar of medieval art. Miner served as the first Keeper of Manuscripts at the Walters Art Museum from 1934 to 1973.

== Career ==
Miner was born to Roy Waldo Miner, who was Curator of Marine Life at the American Museum of Natural History, and Anna Elizabeth Carroll. Miner was of British and Irish descent from her father's and mother's side, respectively. She was a fraternal twin with her brother, Dwight C. Miner, who became a history professor at Columbia University. Born in New York City, she graduated from the local Horace Mann School in 1922. Miner then received a Bachelor of Arts in English and Classics from Barnard College in 1926, was a member of Phi Beta Kappa, and became the first International Fellow, studying abroad at Bedford College of the University of London. Two years later, she began pursuing a Doctor of Philosophy in Art History at Columbia, under Meyer Schapiro, but never completed the program. In 1931, Miner was hired to teach the subject at Barnard.

In 1933, the Morgan Library & Museum hired Miner to assist with the cataloging of the first exhibition in the United States devoted to illuminated manuscripts. In 1934, upon the recommendation of Morgan Library director Belle da Costa Greene, Miner became the first Keeper of Manuscripts at the Walters Art Museum, and eventually held the simultaneous position of Curator of Islamic and Near Eastern Art until her death from cancer in 1973. Her main expertise was in Western medieval manuscripts, and she had interests in Sasanian, Islamic, and Persian art as well.

In 1955 she was the Rosenbach Fellow in Bibliography at the University of Pennsylvania.

In 1981, Claire Richter Sherman published a retrospective on Miner's career. She was named an honorary member of the Society of Scribes & Illuminators.
