= Stand, Columbia =

Alma mater of Columbia University

Song
- Written: 1902
- Published: 1904
- Genre: alma mater
- Composer: Joseph Haydn
- Lyricist: Gilbert Oakley Ward

Audio sample
- file; help

"Stand, Columbia" is the official alma mater of Columbia University in New York City, New York. It was written in Gilbert Oakley Ward for the university's 1902 Class Day ceremonies, and is sung to the tune of Joseph Haydn's "Gott erhalte Franz den Kaiser", which served as the melody for the Austrian national anthem until 1938, and was adopted as the German national anthem in 1922. The hymn is traditionally played at the university's baccalaureate services and commencements.

Another song, "Sans Souci", serves as the alma mater of Columbia College. Composed by alumnus Percy Fridenburg around 1888 while studying medicine in Germany, the tune is based on a German drinking song—the first two stanzas are translations from the original German song, while the third is Fridenburg's own addition. During the first half of the 20th century, it was more popular among students than "Alma Mater", and served as the unofficial alma mater of the entire university. It was officially adopted by Columbia College in 1949.

The use of the Austrian Hymn as the tune for "Stand, Columbia", has often been a point of curiosity. Czech historian Leo M. Mladen once facetiously suggested that the United Nations should set up a system to copyright national anthems, so that Austria could prevent both Germany and Columbia University for using its traditional anthem. Following World War II, the fact that "Stand, Columbia" should share the same tune as the German anthem has been described as "disturbing". The song was also criticized by The Bookman for its tune, due to its more popular association with both the Austrian Empire and the English hymn, "Glorious Things of Thee Are Spoken"; however, the journal did concede that "Columbia was fortunate enough to get some very spirited words" in its alma mater. "Sans Souci", on the other hand, was described as the "one song which really belongs to [Columbia]," its tune being previously relatively unknown.

A 1918 march titled "Columbia" by Edwin Franko Goldman was based on "Stand, Columbia".

== Lyrics ==
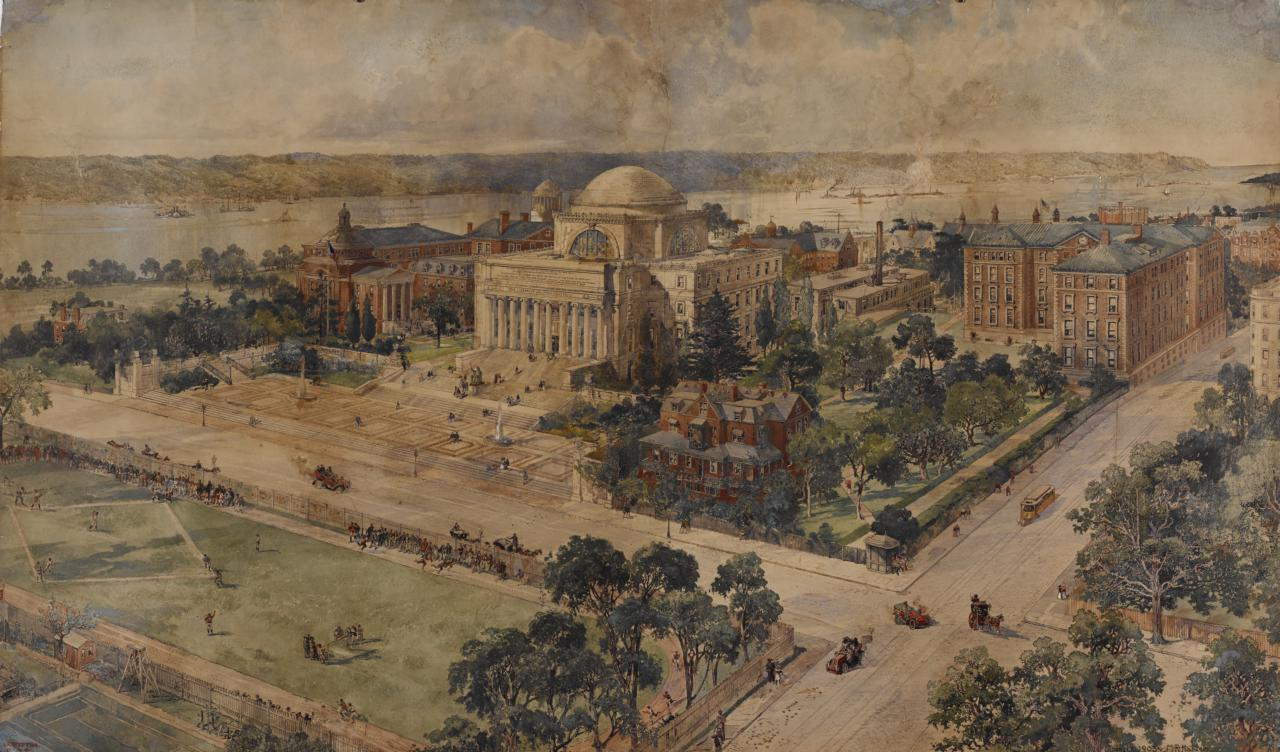
Harry Fenn, Columbia University Campus, Morningside Heights. 1904.

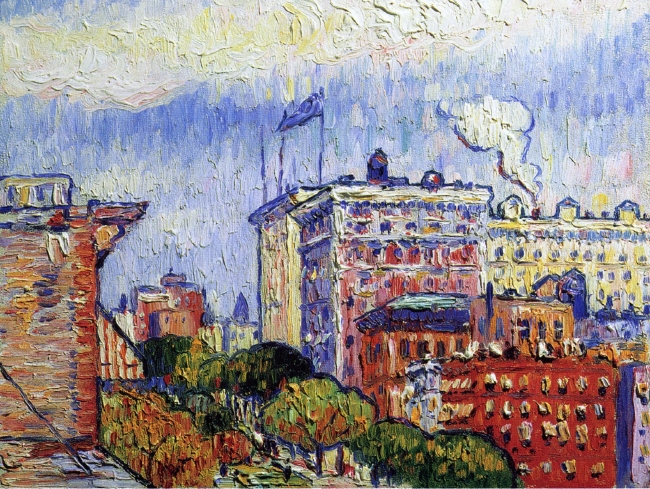
Edward Middleton Manigault, Cityscape. c. 1914.

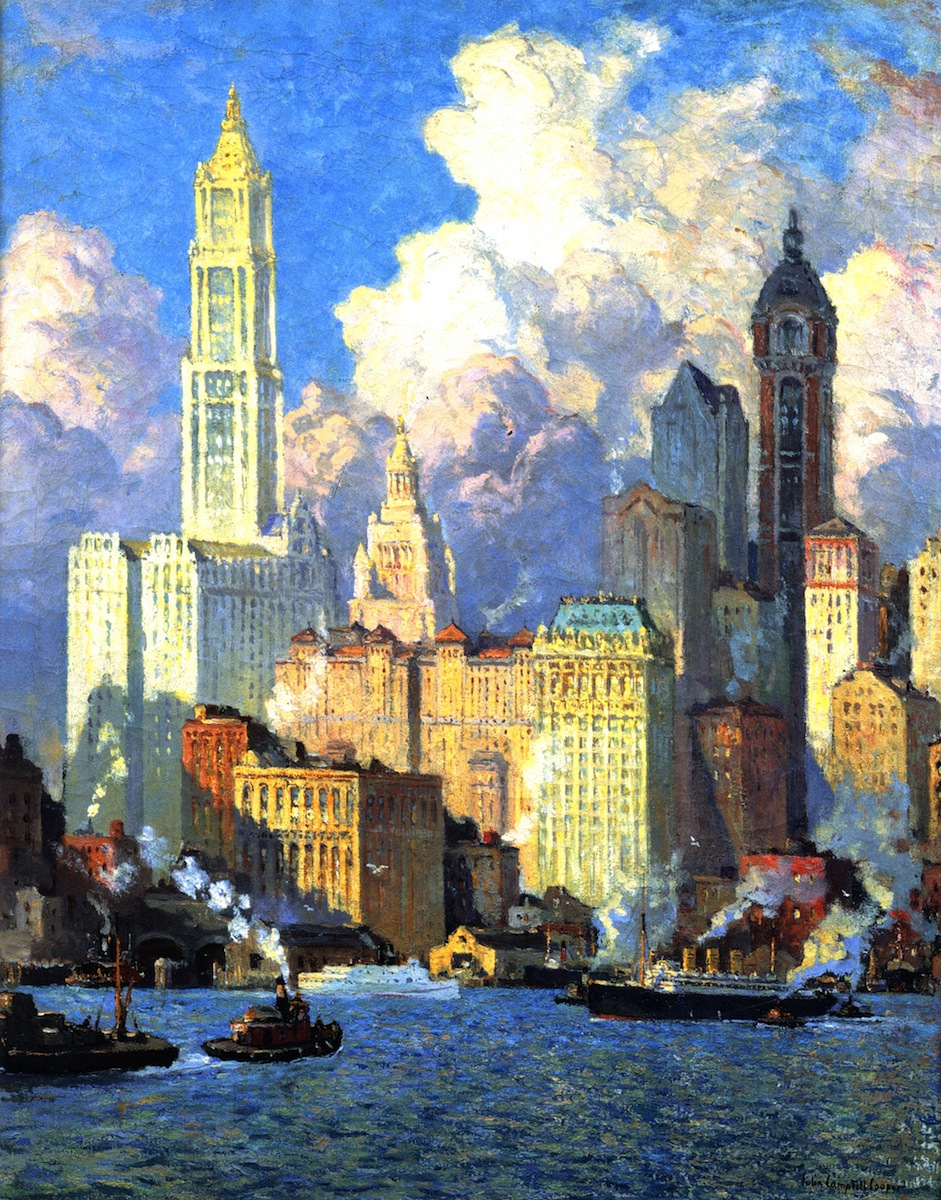
Colin Campbell Cooper, Hudson River Waterfront, N.Y.C. 1913–1921.

The original lyrics to "Stand, Columbia" are as follows:

1.
Mother, stay'd on rock eternal,
Crowned and set upon a height,
Glorified by Light supernal
In thy radiance we see light.
Torch thy children's lamp to kindle,
Beacon star to cheer and guide,
Stand Columbia! Alma Mater
Through the storms of Time abide!

2.
Mighty patriots, warriors, sages,
Though hast borne, a shining band;
Teach thy sons in future ages
Still to love their native land.
Thron'd upon the hill where heroes
Fought for liberty, and died,
Stand Columbia! Alma Mater
Through the storms of Time abide!

3.
Honor, love, and veneration
Crown forevermore thy brow!
Many a grateful generation
Hail thee as we hail thee now!
Till the lordly Hudson seaward
Cease to roil his heaving tide,
Stand Columbia! Alma Mater
Through the storms of Time abide!

Today usually only the first and third verses are sung.
