= New York Academy of Sciences =

American learned society

The New York Academy of Sciences
- Established: 1817
- Type: Nonprofit professional society (IRS exemption status: 501(c)(3))
- Purpose: Science, education, and public policy
- Headquarters: New York City, U.S.
- Region served: Worldwide
- Method: Donations, grants, and subscriptions
- Key people: Nicholas Dirks, CEO and president Samuel L. Mitchill, founder
- Website: nyas.org

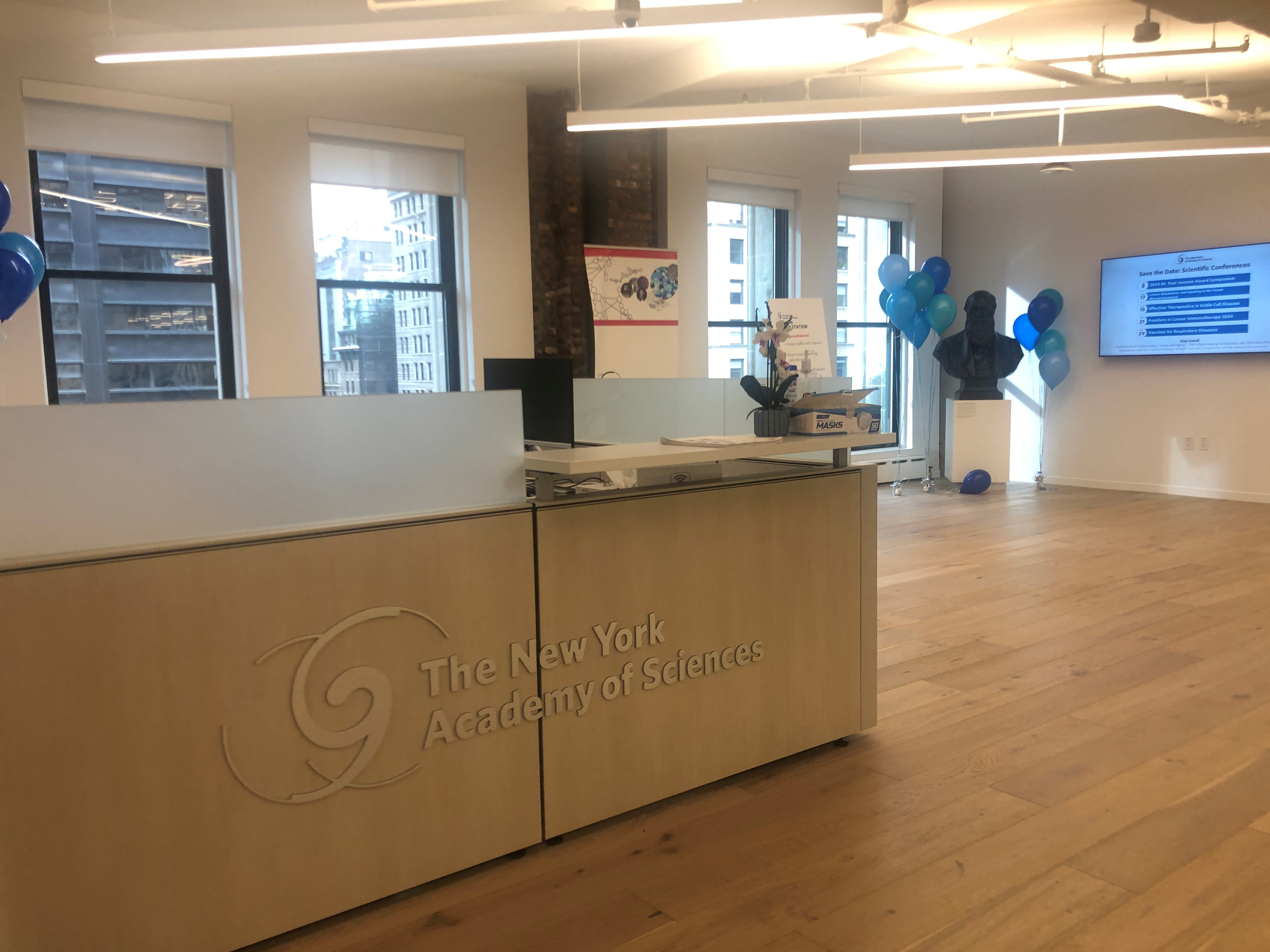
The New York Academy of Sciences office (lobby) on the 8th floor at 115 Broadway in lower Manhattan.

The New York Academy of Sciences (NYAS), founded as the Lyceum of Natural History in January 1817, is a nonprofit professional society based in New York City, with more than 20,000 members from 100 countries. It is the fourth-oldest scientific society in the United States.

The academy hosts programs and publishes scientific content across various disciplines, including life sciences, physical sciences, and social sciences. It addresses cross-disciplinary topics such as nutrition, artificial intelligence, space exploration, and sustainability. These activities support the exchange of scientific information among members and the broader community.

The academy provides resources and support to researchers. In 2020, Nicholas Dirks was appointed as the president and CEO of the academy. Peter Salovey, former President of Yale University, currently serves as the chair of the board of governors.

== History ==
Founded on January 29, 1817, the New York Academy of Sciences was originally called the Lyceum of Natural History. The first meeting, attended by the academy's founder and first president Samuel L. Mitchill took place at the College of Physicians and Surgeons in lower Manhattan. Within a few months, the Lyceum moved to the New York Institution (located on the northwest corner of Broadway and Chambers Street) and began activities including lectures, specimen collection, and a library. In 1823, the Lyceum began publishing its own scientific journal, Annals of the Lyceum of Natural History of New York, which, in 1876, was renamed Annals of the New York Academy of Sciences. By 1826 the Lyceum owned "the richest collection of reptiles and fish in the country."

A fire in 1866 destroyed the collection. Following the fire, the academy turned its focus toward scientific research and inquiry, community outreach, and collaboration. Activities included dissemination of scientific information to the community. Early Academy members played prominent roles in the establishment of New York University in 1831 and the American Museum of Natural History in 1869, and the New York Botanical Garden.

From its early years, the New York Academy of Sciences' membership included a mix of scientists, business people, academics, government workers, and members of the general public. Prominent members have included United States Presidents (Thomas Jefferson and James Monroe), as well as many notable scientists and scholars, including Asa Gray (who served as the superintendent of the academy starting in 1836), John James Audubon, Alexander Graham Bell, Thomas Edison, Louis Pasteur, Charles Darwin, Nikola Tesla, Margaret Mead (who served for a time as the vice president of the academy), Rosalyn Sussman Yalow, Elizabeth Blackburn, and Jennifer Doudna. Prior to 1877, the academy only admitted men, but on November 5, 1877, it elected Erminnie A. Smith the first female member. June Bacon-Bercey was the first African-American, and female African-American, member of the Academy. Members, Honorary Members, Corresponding Members, and Fellows have included many scientists—including Nobel Prize laureates.

However, by 1932, membership had declined to 317 members. Eunice Thomas Miner, a research assistant at the American Museum of Natural History, took on a leadership role in the organization and conducted a series of membership drives and events to increase participation. She served as the executive director from 1935 to 1967 and was credited with reviving the organization, including increasing membership to 26,000 members. She also successfully solicited the donation of a new headquarters for the organization in 1948.

The academy's programs and publications have contributed to scientific discussions and progress over its history, including: in 1876, publishing one of the first studies on environmental pollution; conducting scientific survey and publication The Scientific Survey of Puerto Rico and the Virgin Islands, from 1907 to 1934; holding the first conference and publication of papers on antibiotics in 1945–46; hosting a conference and publishing papers on the cardiovascular effects of smoking in 1960 and on the effects of asbestos on human health in 1964–65; founding the Women in Science Committee in 1977; convening the world's first major scientific conference on AIDS in 1983–1984; and an early conference on SARS in 2003.

More recent activities have included annual meetings on machine learning, Alzheimer's research, early childhood, and sustainability initiatives. The journal published three volumes (in 2010, 2015, and 2019) of scientific studies on climate change in NYC. During the COVID-19 pandemic, the academy produced programming on SARS-CoV-2, vaccines and therapies, and lessons on how to prepare for future outbreaks.

In May 2023, the Academy moved to a new facility on the 8th floor of the United States Realty Building (115 Broadway).

== Publications ==
Annals of the New York Academy of Sciences is one of the oldest continuously published scientific journals in the United States. Annals is peer-reviewed and published monthly in many areas of science, though predominantly the biological sciences. The journal was ranked 13 out of 73 journals in the Multidisciplinary Sciences category by the 2020 Journal Citation Reports™ (Clarivate Analytics).

The Sciences magazine published by the academy from 1961 to 2001 bridged the sciences and culture and received seven National Magazine Awards.

Over the past 15 years, these seminal publications, as well as the academy's archive, were digitized.

== Programs ==
=== Frontiers of Science ===
The New York Academy of Sciences organizes conferences on topics including genomic medicine, chemical, and structural biology, drug discovery, computer science, and urban sustainability. These conferences provide a forum for participants to exchange information on basic and applied research and to discuss the broader role of science, medicine, and technology in society.

=== The Global STEM Alliance and the Junior Academy ===
The Global STEM Alliance offers competitions and training programs. The Junior Academy connects students ages 13 to 17. Each year, 1,000 students from around the world are selected to be a part of the program and compete in 10-week-long challenges.

=== The Science Alliance ===
The Science Alliance supports early-career researchers through networking and professional development.

=== Nutrition Program ===
The New York Academy of Sciences’ Nutrition Science Program gives support for maternal and child nutrition, food safety and food security.

=== International Science Reserve ===
The International Science Reserve (ISR) provides resources (e.g., genomic sequencing, specialized talent, labs, databases, high performance computing), advice, and support with praetorship from companies including IBM, Google, and UL.

=== The Interstellar Initiative ===
The Interstellar Initiative, a program developed with the Japan Agency for Medical Research and Development, supports collaboration between scientists early in their careers.

== Awards ==
The Blavatnik Awards for Young Scientists were established in 2007 by the Blavatnik Family Foundation. They are given each year to scientists and engineers 42 years of age and younger. Selection is based on the quality, novelty and impact of research and potential for further significant contributions to science.

The Tata Transformation Prize, established in 2023 by Tata Sons, gives award in three categories: food security, sustainability and healthcare.

The Innovators in Science Award honors early-career scientist and an outstanding senior scientist for exceptional research contributions in rotating fields of biomedicine.

== Bibliography ==
- Douglas Sloan, "Science in New York City, 1867-1907," Isis 71 (March 1980), pp. 35–76.
- Simon Baatz, Knowledge, Culture, and Science in the Metropolis: The New York Academy of Sciences, 1817–1970, Annals of the New York Academy of Sciences, New York, NY, 1990, Volume 584
- "For Science Academy, Move to World Trade Center Is Like Going Home," The New York Times, October 30, 2006
