= Herbert J. Kramer =

American speech writer, author, lecturer, consultant, Director of Public Affairs

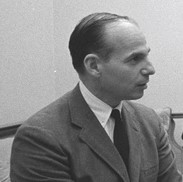
- Kramer in 1968

Director of Public Affairs at the Office of Economic Opportunity
- In office September, 1965 – June, 1968
- President: Lyndon B. Johnson
- Preceded by: Holmes Brown
- Succeeded by: Kenny Sparks

Personal details
- Born: Herbert Julius Kramer; July 27, 1922 New York City, New York, U.S.
- Died: April 9, 1992 (aged 69) West Hartford, Connecticut, U.S.
- Party: Democratic
- Spouse: Karyl (Kern) Kramer (m. 1943; died 1980) Kay Kramer (m. 1980–1992)
- Children: Stephen Kramer; David Kramer; Jonathan Kramer; Katherine (Kramer) Erwin; Susan (Kramer) Gilbert; Christina Kramer; Paul Kramer
- Education: Harvard University bachelor's degree Phi Beta Kappa, magna cum laude, master's and doctorate in English literature; University of Connecticut law degree

Herbert J. Kramer (July 27, 1922 – April 9, 1992) was an American speech writer, author, lecturer, and public relations executive. He served in the Lyndon B. Johnson administration as the Director of Public Affairs at the Office of Economic Opportunity (OEO) which included programs such as Job Corps, Head Start, VISTA, Community Action Program, Foster Grandparents, Legal Services and Upward Bound as part of the War on Poverty. Kramer established an Audio-Visual division within OEO which was nominated for an Academy Award three times in a row during his tenure, winning the award in 1966.

== Education ==
Born in New York City, New York, Kramer attended Horace Mann School, graduating in 1939. He received bachelor's, master's, and PhD degrees from Harvard University in English literature in 1942, 1946, and 1949, respectively, and was an English instructor at Harvard University and the University of California Santa Barbara, until 1951. He received a law degree from the University of Connecticut in 1956.

== Life and career outside of Washington, D.C. ==
From 1951 to 1965 Kramer worked at the Traveler's Insurance Company, eventually becoming vice president in charge of public information and advertising. He was responsible for bringing back the iconic "red umbrella" as the symbol for Traveler's Insurance. Outside of his roles in Washington, Kramer also worked in various capacities — from general manager to creative director — at communications and advertising firms in the Hartford, Connecticut area.

Kramer lived with his wife and seven children in the Edward W. Morley House in West Hartford, a National Historic Landmark. He documented his family life in over 30 hours of silent 16 millimeter film shot between 1944 and 1980. Sometimes the scenes crossed over into his work life, such as when he worked on the Public Service Announcements (PSAs) which used R2D2 and C3PO from Star Wars as characters.(YouTube) Once Kramer found evidence in a book about the Triangle Shirtwaist Factory Fire that his father Charles had rescued some of the women.

In 1969 Kramer gave the commencement speech at Walt Whitman High School in Bethesda, Maryland, in place of Eric Sevareid. His speech was titled "Confessions of an Angry Grandfather". In the speech he listed things about the society that he is angry about, with the hope that "[...] if we could achieve some consensus on just a few [items in the list] we might be able to change the world. Because that is precisely what angry people, united in common cause, can do." In the list Kramer railed against such things as cigarette marketing, harsh punishments for possession of marijuana, racist and other profiling stop-and-search practices by police, and the Vietnam war:

"I am angry at the loss of one life in Vietnam, be it American or Vietnamese, either North or South."

"I am angry at the bankruptcy of our values when we can cheerfully excuse billion dollar overruns for armaments and quibble endlessly over millions to fight poverty."

"I am angry at anyone who [...] protests against welfare payments to helpless children while he searches for loopholes on his income tax."

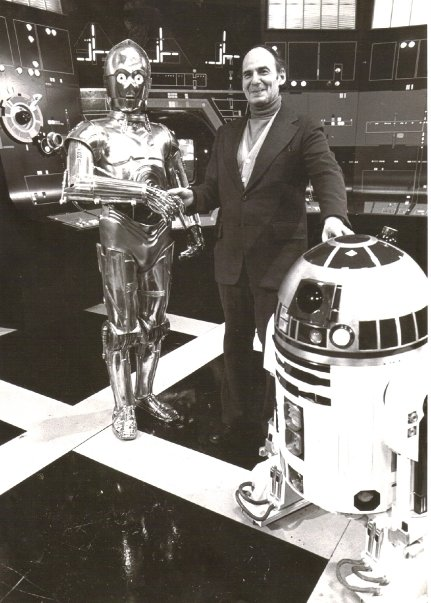
Kramer on the set of a Public Service Announcement with Tony Daniels and Kenny Baker

== Office of Economic Opportunity (OEO) ==
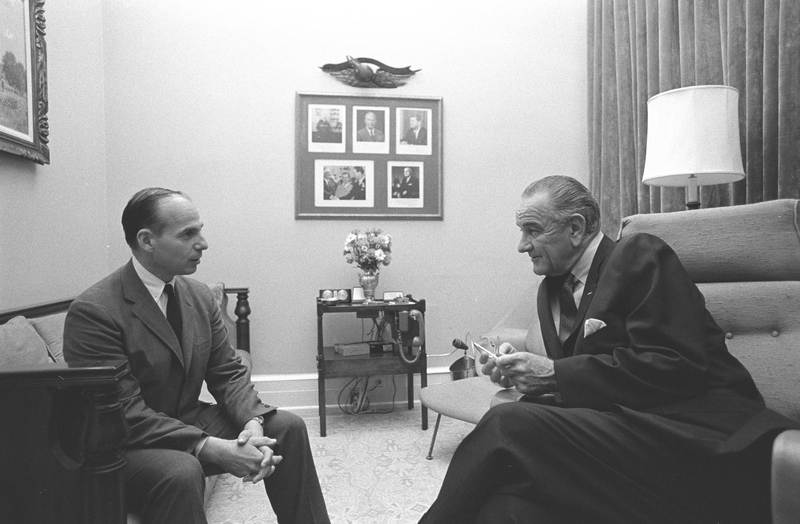
Herbert J. Kramer and President Lyndon Johnson

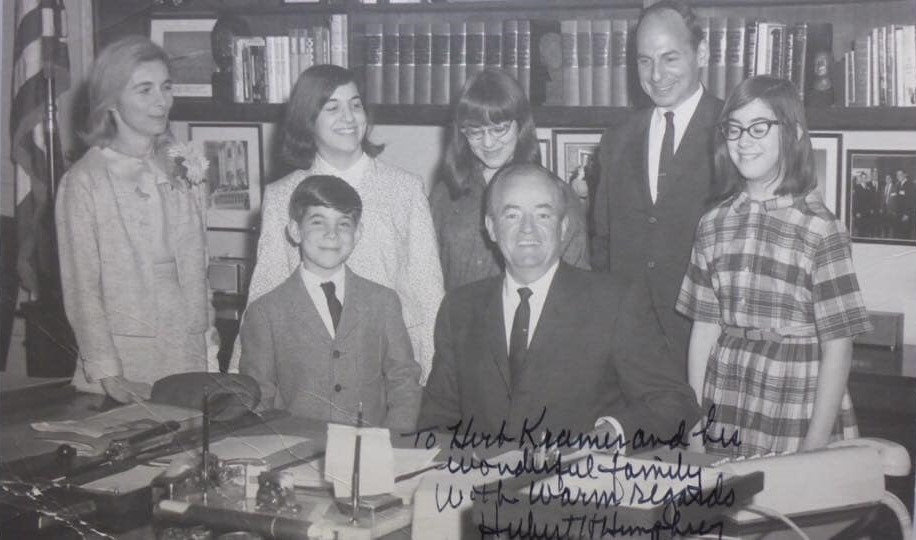
Vice President Hubert Humphrey poses with Herb Kramer, his wife Karyl, and four of their children: Katherine, Susan, Christina, and Paul

Kramer was picked by Sargent Shriver to be the Director of Public Affairs for the Office of Economic Opportunity (OEO) which included programs such as Job Corps, Head Start, VISTA, Community Action Program, and Upward Bound as part of the War on Poverty. Kramer made great strides to mend political fences and bring a level of organization to Washington that he was used to seeing in industry.

=== Scrutiny of OEO and response ===
Kramer's job was a tough one, due to the fact that the OEO was new and was under constant scrutiny from the press. Kramer said: "For the first time poor people, poor youth, black people, people who had heretofore been hidden, were coming up to the surface, and America wasn't liking everything it was seeing about them and about the agency that was doing this." and "We gave black people in this country more power, more opportunity to get on a platform, more opportunity to take positions of leadership, than any other program in the government."

One of the things Kramer did to combat the negative press attention of the war on poverty was to organize a series of five seminars in Washington, D.C., educating members of the press from newspapers around the country on poverty and how to report on poverty. This resulted in a new newspaper section called "Poverty Beat" being published throughout the country. Kramer established direct contact with about 200 newspaper workers throughout America, keeping them apprised of what the OEO was doing from regular letters that he would send out. This was an unprecedented level of transparency from a government agency at the time. One such correspondent, Paul Weeks of the L.A. Times, ended up joining the war on poverty himself. Weeks worked directly for Kramer, and considered Herb as his mentor.

=== Academy Award and nominations ===
Kramer also established an Audio-Visual division within OEO which was nominated for an Academy Award three times in a row during his tenure, winning the award in 1966 for a VISTA program recruiting film.

- 1966 (39th) WINNER "A Year Toward Tomorrow". Sun Dial Films, Inc.; Office of Economic Opportunity. DOCUMENTARY (Short Subject). Edmond A. Levy, Producer.
  - Acceptance Speech: "EDMOND A. LEVY: "A Year toward Tomorrow" was made for VISTA, which many people know as the domestic Peace Corps. And I'd like to thank those VISTAs whose achievements in working with the poor were the basis for the film and the basis for this honor. Thank you." (YouTube)
- 1967 (40th) NOMINEE "While I Run This Race". Sun Dial Films for VISTA, An Economic Opportunity Program. DOCUMENTARY (Short Subject) -- Carl V. Ragsdale, Producer
- 1968 (41st) NOMINEE "A Space to Grow". Office of Economic Opportunity for Project Upward Bound. DOCUMENTARY (Short Subject) -- Thomas P. Kelly, Jr., Producer

=== OEO and President Johnson ===
During Kramer's interview for the Johnson Presidential archives, he was very candid about some of the things allegedly said by President Johnson. Kramer: "Johnson reportedly told Shriver. "I just want you to make sure that no crooks, communists, or cocksuckers get into the program [Community Action]."

=== OEO funding ===
On the topic of the lack of funding for the OEO Kramer didn't mince words. He said "what these people [OEO critics] have criticized fundamentally is the fact that the program never mounted enough of an impact because of the dollar shortage. This is what [Michael] Harrington says--it never became a war on poverty; it was always a skirmish on poverty." and "It was a very, very tough, dirty, mean, unpopular kind of war to fight. And we fought it with every weapon at our disposal, not having the [...] money that would be necessary really to do the kind of job that was required."

== Kennedy Foundation and Special Olympics ==
In addition to his time in the Johnson administration and various roles in industry, a major part of Kramer's working life was back in Washington where he worked for the Kennedy Foundation and helped found the Special Olympics. The Special Olympics oath “Let me win, but if I cannot win, let me be brave in the attempt,” was penned by Kramer. Kramer noted that the Special Olympics had allowed parents to be proud of their intellectually disabled children - something that wasn't the norm in 1968.

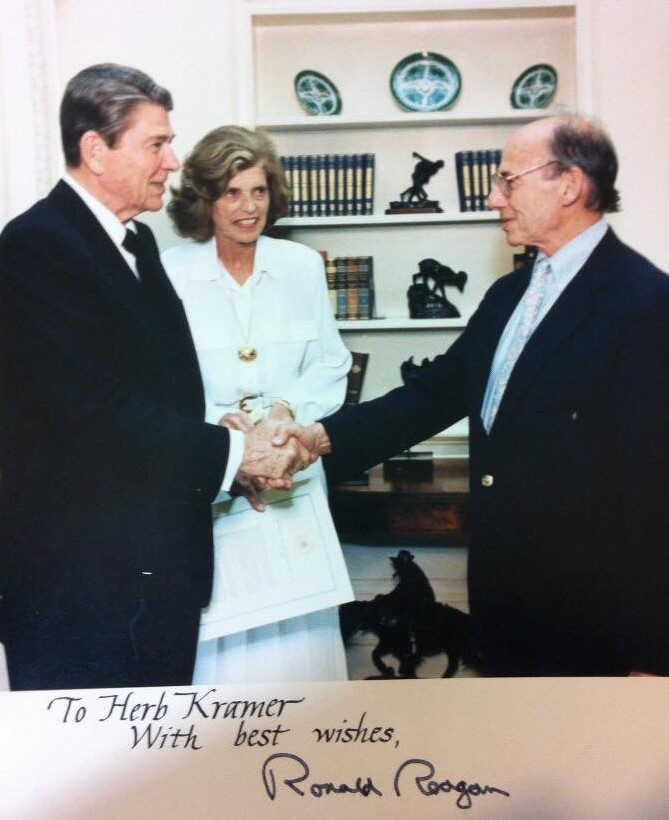
Herbert J. Kramer and Ronald Reagan

== Sargent Shriver ==
Having worked under Sargent Shriver at the Office of Economic Opportunity, Kramer was involved with Shriver in a number of other capacities, including his run for Vice President in 1972, and maintaining notes for Shriver's memoirs (Shriver, Sargent (2026). We Called It A War. Apprentice House Press. ISBN 978-1-62720-666-2.).

=== OEO and Vice Presidential run ===
One of Kramer's skills was in coming up with alternative lyrics to known tunes for mini musical revues. For Shriver's retirement party from the OEO, Kramer wrote a musical revue called "Au Revoir, Sarge". It included lyrics such as "My Bobby lies over the ocean" (a reference to Bobby Kennedy) to the tune of "My Bonnie Lies over the Ocean", a traditional Scottish Folk Song. After the crushing defeat of the Shriver and McGovern ticket against Nixon in the 1972 Presidential Campaign, Kramer wrote another musical revue called the "Lucky Seven Follies", which poked fun at the campaign. Scott Stossel wrote: "The performance was recorded on a vinyl record [...] the uproarious laughter on this saddest of election nights can still be heard clearly over the scratches [...]. The most audible laugh is Sargent Shriver's."

=== "We Called It A War" ===
Kramer assisted Sargent Shriver with his memoir "We Called It A War". The memoir remained unpublished for many decades until it was unearthed in a box of Kramer's old work documents. The story of the discovery is documented in the foreword to the book and in an Athol Daily News article from June 2026. In the article Lucy Di Rosa, executive director of the Sargent Shriver Peace Institute, is quoted as saying “From all the evidence we have, it appears that Mr. Kramer recorded the interviews with Sargent Shriver about his time working on the War on Poverty [...] and then helped him shape them into a manuscript.”

== Illness, death, and book ==
After being diagnosed with Prostate Cancer Kramer wrote a book with his second wife Kay entitled "Conversations at Midnight", documenting the process of coming to terms with dying.

== Audio of LBJ Library Interview ==
Goodell, Stephen. "Oral history transcript, Herbert J. Kramer". Archive.org.
