= Sarah (given name) =

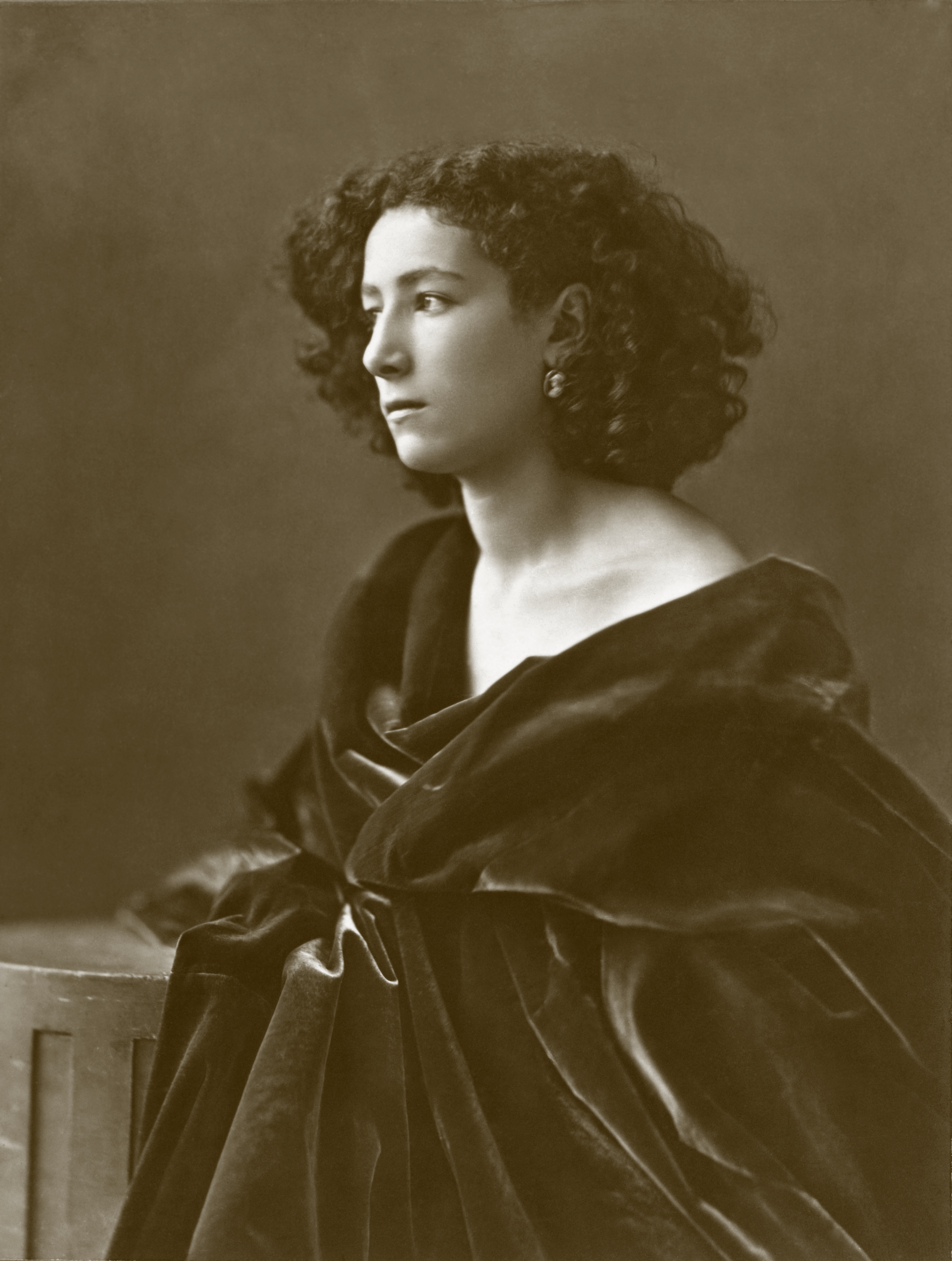
- Actress Sarah Bernhardt (1844–1923) was one well-known bearer of the name.
- Pronunciation: /ˈsɛərə/; French: [sa.ʁa]; German: [zaːʁa]; Spanish: [ˈsaɾa]; Portuguese: [ˈsaɾɐ]; Italian: [ˈsaːra]; Arabic: [ˈsaːra]
- Gender: Female
- Name day: June 26

Origin
- Language: Hebrew
- Meaning: "noblewoman", "princess",
- Region of origin: Hebrew

Other names
- Alternative spelling: Sara
- Nicknames: Sadie; Sally; Sari
- Related names: Sara; Sarai; Sadie; Sasa; Seira; Sairah; Sally; Serah; Serafina; Seraphina
- Popularity: see popular names

Sarah is a common feminine given name of Hebrew origin. It derives its popularity from the biblical matriarch Sarah, the wife of Abraham and a major figure in the Abrahamic religions. It is a consistently popular given name across Europe, North America, and the Middle East — is commonly used as a female first name by Jews, Christians, and Muslims alike, and remains popular also among non-religious members of cultures influenced by these religions.

In Hebrew, Sarah (שָׂרָה) is the feminine form of the noun Sar (שַׂר), which commonly translates to "chief", "ruler" or "prince". It is also related to the verb שָׂרָה, which is also the basis of the name Israel. In Modern Hebrew, Sarah (שָׂרָה) is the feminine form of the word for "minister". In Italy, Sara is a common nickname for the name Serafina/Seraphina, which is in turn derived from the word seraph, a high-ranking angel in the hierarchy of angels.

In the United States, Sarah has been counted among the top 150 given names since 1880, when name popularity statistics were first recorded in the United States. Sarah was ranked among the top 10 names from 1978 to 2002, reaching a plateau of popularity from the early 1980s to 1988. Every year since 1989, it has fallen in popularity, but it remained the 30th most–popular name for newborn girls in 2010. Its most common variant spelling, Sara, was number 121.

The name has been similarly popular in Ireland and the United Kingdom. In England, it gained popularity after the Protestant Reformation. In 2014, Sarah ranked as the tenth most popular female baby name in Ireland.

In Nazi Germany, under the Name Change Ordinance, female Jews who did not have "typically Jewish" given names were forced to add "Sara" as of January 1939, whereas males were forced to add "Israel".

== People ==
- Sarah, Crown Princess of Brunei
- Sarah Abo, Australian television presenter, journalist and reporter
- Sarah Adegoke (born 1997), Nigerian tennis player
- Sarah Alexander (born 1971), English actress
- Sarah A. Anderson (1901–1992), American politician
- Sarah Armstrong-Smith, British Chief information security officer
- Sarah Aroeste (born 1976), Sephardic Jewish musician
- Sarah Ashton-Cirillo (born 1977), American journalist and activist
- Sarah Attar (born 1992), Saudi Arabian-American distance runner
- Sarah Austin (entrepreneur) (born 1986), American author and tech entrepreneur
- Sarah Baartman (1789–1815), Khoikhoi woman
- Sarah Franklin Bache (1743–1808), daughter of Benjamin Franklin and Deborah Read
- Sarah Randolph Bailey (1885–1972), American educator and Girl Scout pioneer
- Sarah Baker (actress), American actress and comedian
- Sarah Gertrude Banks (1839–1926), American physician and suffragist
- Sarah Ashlee Barker (born 2001), American basketball player
- Sarah Baxendale (born 1978 or 1979), British actress
- Sarah Beeny (born 1972), English property developer and TV presenter
- Sarah Bernhardt (1844–1923), French stage actress
- Sarah Uriarte Berry (born 1969), American actress and singer
- Sarah Bigall (born 1987), German politician
- Sarah Bireete, Ugandan lawyer and political activist
- Sarah Blasko (born 1976), Australian singer, songwriter, musician and record producer
- Sarah Bolger (born 1991), Irish actress
- Sarah Bond (executive) (born 1978), American business executive
- Sarah Bond (historian), American historian
- Sarah Bond Hanley (born 1865), American politician
- Sarah Bonnici (born 1998), Maltese singer
- Sarah Bool (born 1987/8), British politician
- Sarah Borwell (born 1979), British tennis player
- Sarah Boudaoud (born 1995), Algerian international footballer
- Sarah A. Bowman (1813–1866), Irish American innkeeper, restaurateur, and madam
- Sarah Bremer (born 1999), German politician
- Sarah Rees Brennan (born 1983), Irish children's writer
- Sarah Emi Bridcutt (born 1989), Japanese voice actress
- Sarah Brightman (born 1960), British singer and actress
- Sarah Jane Brown (born 1963), British campaigner for global health and education
- Sarah Bryce (born 2000), Scottish cricketer
- Sarah Burton (disappeared 2018), American missing woman
- Sarah Bush Lincoln (1788–1869), stepmother of Abraham Lincoln
- Sarah Buxton (born 1980), American musician
- Sarah G. Buxton (born 1965), American actress
- Sarah Byford, British economist
- Sarah Wayne Callies (born 1977), American actress
- Sarah Carter (born 1980), Canadian-American actress
- Sarah Helen Carter (1974–2024), Australian politician, mayor of Maribyrnong City Council
- Sarah Chalke (born 1976), Canadian actress and model
- Sarah Champion (born 1969), British politician
- Sarah Chang (born 1980), Korean American classical violinist
- Sarah Churchill, Duchess of Marlborough (1660–1744), British duchess
- Sarah Churchill (actress) (1914–1982), British actress and dancer
- Sarah Cissé (born 2007), French basketball player
- Sarah Clarke (born 1972), American actress
- Sarah Coe (ice hockey) (born 2003), Canadian ice hockey player
- Sarah Colonna (born 1974), American stand-up comedian, actress, and comedy writer
- Sarah Connolly (born 1963), English mezzo—soprano
- Sarah Connor (singer) (born 1980), German singer
- Sarah Palfrey Cooke (1912–1996), American tennis player
- Sarah Cooper (born 1977), Jamaican American comedian and author
- Sarah Cooper-Lesadd (born 1994 or 1995), Welsh politician
- Sarah-Ève Coutu-Godbout, Canadian ice hockey player
- Sarah Coyte (born 1991), Australian cricketer
- Sarah Cracknell (born 1965), English singer-songwriter and lead singer of the electronic music band Saint Etienne
- Sarah Damaske, American sociologist
- Sarah Dambanevana (1990–2026), Zimbabwean cricket umpire
- Sarah Darling (born 1982), American musician
- Sarah Dash (1945–2021), American singer
- Sarah Davis (politician) (born 1976), American politician
- Sarah Iliff Davis (1820–1909), American milliner, business woman, philanthropist
- Sarah Desjardins (born 1994), Canadian actress
- Sarah Dessen (born 1970), American writer and novelist
- Sarah E. Diamond, American ecologist
- Sarah E. Dickson (1880–1965), American Presbyterian elder
- Sarah Dines (born 1965), British politician
- Sarah Discaya, Filipino politician and businesswoman involved in the Philippine flood control projects controversy
- Sarah Dorsey (1829–1879), American novelist and historian
- Sarah Douglas (actress) (born 1952), English actress
- Sarah Doyle, British poet
- Sarah Dreier (born 1995), Austrian ski mountaineer
- Sarah Drew (born 1980), American actress and director
- Sarah Dunant (born 1950), English writer, broadcaster and critic
- Sarah Edmondson, Canadian actress and podcaster
- Sarah Emma Edmonds (1841–1898), British North American-born woman
- Sarah Edwards (actress) (1881–1965), American actress
- Sarah Edwards (missionary) (1710–1758), American mystic
- Sarah Fyge Egerton (1668–1723), British writer
- Sarah Elfreth (born 1988), American politician in Maryland
- Sarah Elliott (cricketer) (born 1982), Australian women's cricketer
- Sarah Ellis (author) (born 1952), Canadian children's writer and librarian
- Sarah Elmaleh, American voice actor
- Sarah Engels (born 1992), German pop singer and TV personality
- Sarah Everhardt (born 2006), American figure skater
- Sarah Ewens (born 1992), Scottish footballer
- Sarah Featherstone (born 1966), British architect
- Sarah Feinberg (born 1977), American civil servant
- Sarah Ferguson (born 1959), British former member of the British royal family
- Sarah Ferguson (journalist) (born 1965), Australian journalist, reporter and television presenter
- Sarah Ferguson (politician) (1942–2022), Jersey politician
- Sarah Fielding (1710–1768), British writer
- Sarah Fillier (born 2000), Canadian ice hockey player
- Sarah Dawn Finer (born 1981), Swedish singer, songwriter and actress
- Sarah Finnegan (born 1996), American artistic gymnast
- Sarah Fisher (born 1980), American race car driver
- Sarah Fisher, American Episcopal bishop
- Sarah Flaxmer (fl. 1790s), English religious polemicist
- Sarah Foot (born 1961), British historian and Anglican priest
- Sarah Forbes Bonetta (1843–1880), West African princess
- Sarah Frey (born 1976), American farmer and entrepreneur
- Sarah Fuller Flower Adams (1805–1848), English poet and hymnwriter
- Sarah Fuller (athlete) (born 1999), American soccer and football player
- Sarah Ferguson (born 1959), British author, television personality, and former member of the British royal family
- Sarah E. Gabbett (1833–1911), American medal designer and first Custodian of the Southern Cross of Honor
- Sarah Gadon (born 1987), Canadian actress
- Sarah Gailey (born 1990), American author
- Sarah Ewing Sims Carter Gaut (1826–1912), American secessionist and Confederate spy
- Sarah Michelle Gellar (born 1977), American actress
- Sarah Geronimo (born 1988), Filipino singer and actress
- Sarah Gilbert (born 1962), English vaccinologist
- Sarah Godlewski (born 1981), American businesswoman and politician
- Sarah Goldberg (born 1985), Canadian actress
- Sarah Good (1655–1692), woman executed in the Salem Witch Trials
- Sarah E. Goode (1855–1905), American entrepreneur and inventor
- Sarah Goodridge (1788–1853), American artist
- Sarah Gorden (born 1992), American soccer player
- Sarah Urist Green (born 1979), American art museum curator, author, and creator
- Sarah Greene (born 1957), English TV presenter
- Sarah Greene (actress) (born 1984), Irish actress and singer
- Sarah Moore Grimké (1792–1873), American abolitionist
- Sarah-Emanuela Gröber (born 1986), German politician
- Sarah Grochala (born 1973), British playwright
- Sarah Israelit Groll (1925–2007), Israeli Egyptologist and linguist
- Sarah Ogan Gunning (1910–1983), American songwriter and folk singer
- Sarah Hadland (born 1971), English actress
- Sarah Haffner (1940–2018), German—British author, painter and active feminist
- Sarah Hagmann (born 1985), German politician
- Sarah Haider (born 1991), American writer, public speaker, and political activist
- Sarah Josepha Hale (1788–1879), American writer, activist and editor
- Sarah C. Hall (1832–1926), American physician, suffragist
- Sarah Tyson Hallowell (1846–1924), American art curator
- Sarah Harding (1981–2021), English singer, model and actress
- Sarah Harmer (born 1970), Canadian singer, songwriter and environmental activist
- Sarah Harrington, British artist
- Sarah Hart (disambiguation), several people
- Sarah Hay (born 1987), American actress and ballerina
- Sarah Heap (1870–1960), New Zealand physical education teacher and drill mistress
- Sarah Hegazi (1989–2020), Egyptian socialist, writer and lesbian activist
- Sarah Henderson (born 1964), Australian politician, lawyer and former journalist
- Sarah Hengler (c.1765 –1845) British businesswomen and firework artist
- Sarah Hirini (born 1992), New Zealand rugby Union player
- Sarah Hirshland (born 1975), chief executive officer of the United States Olympic Committee
- Sarah Hoge (born 1987), German politician
- Sarah A. Hoyt (born 1962), Portuguese-born American science fiction, fantasy, mystery, and historical fiction writer
- Sarah Blaffer Hrdy (born 1946), American anthropologist and primatologist
- Sarah Huchet (born 1994), French footballer
- Sarah Hudson (singer) (born 1984), American singer and musician
- Sarah A. Hughes (1847–1816), African Methodist Episcopal preacher
- Sarah T. Hughes (1896–1985), American lawyer and federal judge
- Sarah Hughes (born 1985), American politician and former competitive figure skater
- Sarah Hyland (born 1990), American actress
- Sarah Ichioka, American urban planner and art curator
- Sarah Idan (born 1990), Iraqi-American model, television host, musician, beauty pageant titleholder, and politician
- Sarah Iliev (born 2006), French female tennis player
- Sarah Illingworth (born 1963), English-born New Zealand former cricketer
- Sarah Imovbioh (born 1992), Nigerian basketball player
- Sarah Inghelbrecht (born 1992), Belgian road and track cyclist
- Sarah Ioannides (born 1972), British conductor, collaborator and multimedia
- Sarah Irving, Canadian businesswoman
- Sarah Isgur (born 1982), American lawyer and political operative
- Sarah Iversen (born 1990), Danish handball player
- Sarah Noble Ives (1864–1944), American painter, illustrator and writer
- Sarah Yorke Jackson (1805–1887), First Lady of the United States
- Sarah Jaffe (born 1986), American musician from Denton, Texas
- Sarah Jarosz (born 1991), American musician
- Sarah Jeffery (born 1996), Canadian actress
- Sarah Orne Jewett (1849–1909), American novelist, short story writer and poet
- Sarah Anne Johnson (born 1976), Canadian artist
- Sarah Iles Johnston (born 1957), American classical scholar
- Sarah Jones (screen actress), American actress
- Sarah Jurgens, Canadian actress, producer, casting director, model, photographer and multimedia artist
- Sarah Kamya, creator of Little Free Diverse Library project
- Sarah Kane (1971–1999), English playwright, screenwriter and theatre director
- Sarah Kaufman (born 1985), Canadian mixed martial artist
- Sarah Kendall (born 1976), Australian comedian
- Sarah Kendzior (born 1978), American author, anthropologist, researcher, and scholar
- Sarah Kennedy (born 1950), British DJ
- Sarah Keyworth (born 1993), English stand-up comedian
- Sarah Khalifa (born 1994), Egyptian businesswoman, entrepreneur and convicted criminal
- Sarah Khan (born 1992), Pakistani actress
- Sarah Kinsley (born 2000), American singer-songwriter
- Sarah Knauss (1880–1999), American supercentenarian
- Sarah Kemble Knight (1666–1727), American teacher and businesswoman
- Sarah Kimani (born 1990), Kenyan journalist
- Sarah Koenig (born 1969), American journalist and podcast host
- Sarah Kofman (1934–1994), French philosopher
- Sarah Kraning (born 1992/1993), American visual artist
- Sarah Kustok (born 1981), American sports reporter
- Sarah Lacina (born 1984), American reality show contestant
- Sarah Lahbati (born 1993), Swiss-born Filipino actress and reality star
- Sarah Lancashire (born 1964), English actress
- Sarah Lancaster, American actress
- Sarah Lane (born 1984), American ballet dancer
- Sarah Lawrence (educator) (1780–1859), English educator, writer and literary editor
- Sarah Josephine Meredith Langstaff (1849–1933), Canadian-American socialite
- Sarah Leavitt, Canadian graphic novelist
- Sarah Levy (actress) (born 1986), Canadian actress
- Sarah Levy (rugby union) (born 1995), American Olympic rugby union and rugby sevens player
- Sarah Lind (born 1982), Canadian actress
- Sarah Logan (born 1993), American professional wrestler
- Sarah Longwell, American political strategist and publisher
- Sarah Lucas (born 1962), English photographer and sculptor
- Sarah J. Maas (born 1986), American writer
- Sarah Ladipo Manyika, British-Nigerian writer
- Sarah Mardini (born 1995), Syrian former competition swimmer, lifeguard and human rights activist
- Sarah Y. Mason (1896–1980), American screenwriter and script supervisor
- Sarah McBride (born 1990), American transgender rights activist and politician
- Sarah McGuinness, Irish singer, composer, producer, director, and screenwriter
- Sarah Galt Elwood McKee (1842–1934), Canadian social reformer and temperance leader
- Sarah McLachlan (born 1968), Canadian musician, singer and songwriter
- Sarah McLeod (musician) (born 1973), Australian singer-songwriter
- Sarah Meier (born 1984), Swiss figure skater
- Sarah Newcomb Merrick (1844–1922), Canadian-born American educator, writer, businesswoman and physician
- Sarah Miles (born 1941), British actress
- Sarah Milgrim, American victim of a 2025 shooting
- Sarah Millican (born 1975), English comedian, writer and presenter
- Sarah Milroy (born 1957), Canadian museum director and curator
- Sarah Mirr (born 2000), American soccer player
- Sarah Monette (born 1974), American novelist and short story writer
- Sarah Mortensen (born 1997), Danish basketballer
- Sarah Mourão (born 2010), Brazilian rhythmic gymnast
- Sarah Mullally (born 1962), British Anglican bishop, Archbishop of Canterbury, Lord Spiritual, and former nurse
- Sarah Murdoch (born 1972), British-Australian model, actress, and television presenter
- Sarah Myhre, American climate scientist
- Sarah Natochenny, American voice actress and film director
- Sarah Nemtsov (born 1980), German composer
- Sarah Neufeld (born 1979), Canadian musician
- Sarah Newton (born 1961), British politician
- Sarah Niles, British film, TV and theatre actress
- Sarah Nixey (born 1973), British singer-songwriter
- Sarah Noriega (born 1976), American volleyball player, collegiate champion and Olympic athlete
- Sarah Noutcha (born 1999), French fencer
- Sarah Nurse (born 1995), Canadian ice hockey player
- Sarah Nuttall, South African academic and cultural critic
- Sarah Ockwell-Smith, English writer
- Sarah O’Connor, American molecular biologist
- Sarah Onyango Obama (1922–2021), Kenyan educator and philanthropist
- Sarah Olney (born 1977), British politician
- Sarah Oppenheimer (born 1972), American artist
- Sarah Ortmeyer, German artist
- Sarah Osborne, colonist in the Massachusetts Bay colony and one of the first women to be accused of witchcraft in the Salem witch trials of 1692
- Sarah Otto (born 1967), Canadian scientist
- Sarah Ourahmoune (born 1982), French former female boxer
- Sarah Outen (born 1985), British athlete and adventurer
- Sarah Owen (born 1983), British politician and trade unionist
- Sarah Palin (born 1964), American politician, commentator, author and TV personality
- Sarah Parish (born 1968), English actress
- Sarah Jessica Parker (born 1965), American actress and TV producer
- Sarah Paulson (born 1974), American actress
- Sarah Payne (1991–2000), English murder victim
- Sarah Jo Pender (born 1979), American murderer
- Sarah Pett, British medical researcher
- Sarah Phelps, British television screenwriter, radio writer, playwright and television producer
- Sarah Pinborough, English author and screenwriter
- Sarah Pinsker, American science fiction and fantasy author
- Sarah Polley (born 1979), Canadian filmmaker, writer, political activist and retired actress
- Sarah Poncio (born 1997), Brazilian politician
- Sarah Pounds, American politician
- Sarah Pudifin-Jones, South African lawyer
- Sarah Quigley, New Zealand author
- Sarah Quintrell, English writer, producer and actress
- Sarah Quraishi, Pakistani aerospace engineer
- Sarah Rafferty (born 1972), American film and TV actress
- Sarah Ramos (born 1991), American actress
- Sarah N. Randolph (1839–1892), American educator, school principal, historian, and an author
- Sarah Rector (1902–1967), African American member of the Muskogee (Creek) Nation
- Sarah Reeves (born 1989), American musician and singer
- Sarah E. Reisman, American chemist
- Sarah Mower Requa (1829–1922), American philanthropist and California pioneer
- Sarah Rice (1955–2024), U.S. stage actress
- Sarah Rice (banker) (died 1842), English businesswoman
- Sarah Richardson (born 1971), Canadian interior designer and television personality
- Sarah Roberts (actress) (born 1984), Australian TV and film actress
- Sarah Robles (born 1988), American weightlifter
- Sarah Roemer (born 1984), American actress
- Sarah Rogers Haight (1808–1881), American traveler and writer
- Sarah Romert (born 1994), German footballer
- Sarah Rowe (born 1995), Australian rules footballer
- Sarah Ruden (born 1962), American writer
- Sarah Ruhl (born 1974), American playwright, poet, professor, and essayist
- Sarah Huckabee Sanders (born 1982), American politician and political press secretary
- Sarah Scheurich (born 1993), German boxer
- Sarah Schulman (born 1958), American novelist, playwright, nonfiction writer, screenwriter, gay activist, and AIDS historian
- Sarah Semple (born 1973), British archaeologist
- Sarah Shahi (born 1980), American actress
- Sarah Sherman (born 1993), American comedian, actress and screenwriter
- Sarah Siddons (1755–1831), Welsh actress
- Sarah Silverman (born 1970), American comedian, actress and writer
- Sarah Sjöström (born 1993), Swedish swimmer
- Sarah Slean (born 1977), Canadian singer-songwriter, composer and musician
- Sarah K. Smith, artist and educator
- Sarah Kirkland Snider (born 1973), American composer
- Sarah Snook (born 1987), Australian actress
- Sarah Solemani (born 1982), English actress, writer and activist
- Sarah Springman (born 1956), British-Swiss triathlete, civil engineer, and academic
- Sarah Squire (born 1949), British diplomat
- Sarah Stiles (born 1979), American singer-actor
- Sarah Stock (born 1979), American professional wrestler
- Sarah Strong (born 2006), American basketball player
- Sarah Sutherland (born 1988), Canadian-American actress
- Dame Sarah Swift GBE, RRC (1854–1937), founder of Royal College of Nursing
- Sarah Taylor (cricketer) (born 1989), English women cricketer
- Sarah Teather (born 1974), British politician
- Sarah Thomas (American football official) (born 1973), American football official
- Sarah Thomas (marathon swimmer), American marathon swimmer
- Sarah Thompson (actress) (born 1979), American actress
- Sarah Thomson (publisher) (born 1968), Canadian politician
- Sarah Thornton (born 1965), Canadian writer, ethnographer and sociologist
- Sarah Tishkoff (born 1965), American geneticist
- Sarah Toscano (born 2006), Italian singer-songwriter and actress
- Sarah Treem, American playwright, writer and producer
- Sarah Trigger (born 1968), British actress
- Sarah Trimmer (1741–1810), British author and editor
- Sarah True (born 1981), American triathlete
- Sarah E. Turner (born 1966), American professor of economics and education and Souder Family Endowed Chair at the University of Virginia
- Sarah Ulmer (born 1976), New Zealand former cyclist
- Sarah Unsicker (born 1976), American politician
- Sarah Updike Goddard, American printer and newspaper publisher
- Sarah Utterback (born 1982), American actress
- Sarah Uwera (born 1996), Rwandan cricketer and a former captain of the Rwanda women's cricket team
- Sarah Vaillancourt (born 1985), Canadian women's ice hockey player
- Sarah Van Den Boom, French animation film director and co-founder of the Papy3D Productions
- Sarah Vaughan (1924–1990), American jazz and classical singer
- Sarah Vaughan (writer), British writer and journalist
- Sarah Villiers, Countess of Jersey (1785–1867), English noblewoman and banker
- Sarah Vinci (born 1991), Australian Paralympic wheelchair basketball player
- Sarah Vine (born 1967), British columnist
- Sarah Vogel, American farm advocate, author, former politician, and lawyer
- Sarah Voss (born 1999), German artistic gymnast
- Sarah Vowell (born 1969), American historian, author, journalist, essayist, social commentator and actress
- Sarah Walsh (born 1983), Australian soccer player
- Sarah Washington, British singer
- Sarah Waters (born 1966), Welsh novelist
- Sarah Weddington (1945–2021), American attorney, law professor, advocate for women's rights and reproductive health, and member of the Texas House of Representatives
- Sarah Leah Whitson, American lawyer and the executive director
- Sarah Wiedenheft, Dutch-American voice actress
- Sarah Wildes (1627–1692), wrongly convicted of witchcraft during the Salem witch trials
- Sarah Anne Williams, American voice actress
- Sarah D. Winans (1841–1915), American organizational leader
- Sarah Winchester (1839–1922), American heiress and occultist
- Sarah Winnemucca, Northern Paiute writer, activist and educator
- Sarah Wollaston (born 1962), British politician
- Sarah Woodward (born 1963), British actress
- Sarah Wozniewicz (born 2003), Canadian ice hockey player
- Sarah Wright (disambiguation), multiple people
- Sarah Wynn-Williams, New Zealand former Facebook director
- Sarah X Dylan (born 1980), American Internet radio host, Internet television host, former radio producer and talk show co-host
- Sarah Yates (born 1987), British artist
- Sarah York (born 1978), American pen pal of Manuel Noriega
- Sarah Young (author) (1946–2023), American Christian author
- Sarah Young (DJ) (born 1989), British DJ and record producer
- Sarah Young (immunologist), New Zealand immunologist
- Sarah Yuster (born 1957), American painter
- Sarah Zadrazil (born 1993), Austrian association football player
- Sarah Zapata (born 1988), Peruvian-American textile artist
- Sarah Zar, American visual artist, songwriter, performance artist, curator, and a musical saw player
- Sarah Zechman, professor of business
- Sarah Zeid (born 1972), Jordanian princess
- Sarah Zerbes (born 1978), German algebraic number theorist
- Sarah Zettel (born 1966), American author
- Sarah Zucker, American visual artist and writer

=== Fictional characters ===
- Sarah Bryant (Virtua Fighter), a video game character from the Virtua Fighter series
- Sarah Connor, the protagonist of the Terminator franchise
- Sarah Essen, a GCPD detective in the DC Universe
- Sarah Henrickson, a character on the HBO series Big Love
- Sarah Horton, a character from Days of Our Lives
- Sarah Kerrigan, a character in Blizzard Entertainment's StarCraft franchise
- Sarah Knuckey (Marrow), sometimes known as Sarah Rushman, a mutant character in Marvel Comics.
- Sarah Moffat, a fictional television character from Upstairs, Downstairs
- Sarah Platt, a character from the British ITV soap opera Coronation Street
- Sarah Ryall (Scanner), a member of the Acolytes in Marvel Comics.
- Sarah Silverman, the main character from the American television sitcom The Sarah Silverman Program
- Sarah Jane Smith, a character in Doctor Who
- Sarah Thompson, in the Home and Away soap opera
- Sarah Vale (Network), a student of the Xavier Institute in Marvel Comics
- Sarah Walker (Chuck), the alias of one of the main characters of Chuck
- Sarah Williams (Labyrinth), the protagonist of Labyrinth

== Other forms ==
- Other variants of the name are: Sara (alternatively pronounced /ˈsɑːrə/)
- Pet forms of the name are: Sally, Sadie

== See also ==
- Sarah (disambiguation)
- Sára, Hungarian and Czech form
