= Hoge =

Hoge may refer to:

== People ==
=== Surname ===
- Dean Hoge (1937–2008), American sociologist
- Enos D. Hoge (1831-1916), American judge, lawyer, and territorial legislator
- James F. Hoge, Jr. (1935–2023), American foreign Policy expert
- Jane Currie Blaikie Hoge (1811–1890), American civil rights activist
- John Hoge, (1760–1824) American politician from Pennsylvania
- John B. Hoge (1825–1896), American politician from West Virginia
- Joseph P. Hoge (1810–1891), American politician
- Matthew Ryan Hoge (born 1974), American writer
- Merril Hoge (born 1965), American football player
- Sara Haines Smith Hoge (1864-1939), American temperance activist
- Sarah Hoge (born 1987), German politician
- Solomon L. Hoge (1836–1909), American politician
- Tristen Hoge (born 1997), American football player
- Warren Hoge (1941–2023), American journalist
- Will Hoge (born 1972), American musician
- William Hoge (disambiguation)

=== Nickname ===
- Hoge Workman (1899–1972), American baseball player

== Other uses ==
- Hoge, Kansas, United States
- Hoge Building, in Seattle Washington, United States
- Hover out of ground effect, ability for an aircraft to stand still in the air
- hoge, a metasyntactic variable (placeholder in computer science) commonly used in Japan (Japanese version of foo)
- Hoge Finance, a deflationary cryptocurrency launched in 2021.
