= Byford (surname) =

Byford is a surname. Notable people with the surname include:

- Andy Byford (born 1965), British public transportation executive
- Biff Byford (born 1951), English singer, lead vocalist of Saxon
- Hazel Byford, Baroness Byford (born 1941), British politician
- Mark Byford (born 1958), Deputy Director General of the BBC and head of BBC Journalism
- Martin Byford (born 1972), British racing driver
- Roy Byford (1873–1939), British actor
- Sarah Byford, British economist
- Timothy John Byford (1941–2014), English author, actor, film director, translator, and educator
- William Heath Byford (1817–1890), American physician, surgeon and gynecologist

== See also ==
- W. Byford Jones (1905–1977), English writer
