= Sarah Young =

Sarah Young may refer to:

- Sarah Young (field hockey) (born 1981), Australian field hockey player
- Sarah Young (DJ) (born 1989), British DJ
- Sarah Young (immunologist), New Zealand immunology academic
- Sarah Palmer Young (1830–1908), regimental nurse during the American Civil War
- Sarah Hanson-Young (born 1981), Australian politician
- Jeanne Young (Sarah Jane Young, 1866–1955), Australian political reformer
- Sarah Young (sailor) (died 2015), died in the 2015–16 Clipper Round the World Yacht Race
- Sarah Young (author) (1946–2023), Presbyterian writer, author of Jesus Calling
- Sarah Young, former member of experimental indie rock band Cloud Cult
