= Hogei =

Hogei may refer to:

- twenty in Basque language
- Kyodo Hogei, the former name of Kyodo Senpaku, a whaling department of Japanese fisheries
- Kyokuyo Hogei Kaisha Whaling Company, one of the biggest Japanese whaling company
- Toyo Hogei K.K., a modern whaling company in Japan
- Valea Hogei, a village in Lipova, Bacău, a commune in Bacău County, Romania where Romanian mathematician Gheorghe Vrânceanu is born in 1900

== Species Latin names ==
- Amphisbaena hogei (Vanzolini, 1950), a worm lizard species in the genus Amphisbaena
- Ranacephala hogei (Mertens, 1967), a turtle species in the genus Ranacephala and the family Chelidae found in Brazil. This species has previously been referred to using synonyms Phrynops hogei and Mesoclemmys hogei.

== See also ==
- Hoge (disambiguation)
