= Karig (surname) =

Karig is a surname. Notable people with the surname include:

- Sára Karig (1914–1999), Hungarian writer and poet
- Walter Karig, American writer
