= Sally Hart =

Sally Hart may refer to:

- Sally Hart (Family Affairs), fictional character from British soap Family Affairs
- Sally-Ann Hart, British Conservative Party politician

== See also ==
- Sarah Hart (disambiguation)
