= Sára =

Sára is a Hungarian and Czech female given name. It may also be a Hungarian surname. Notable people with this name include:

== Given name ==
- Sára Bácskai (born 1999), Hungarian short track speed skater
- Sára Bejlek, Czech tennis player
- Sára Cholnoky (born 1988), Hungarian sailor
- Sára Jahodová, Czech curler
- Sára Kaňkovská (born 1998), Czech racing cyclist
- Sára Karig (1914–1999), Hungarian writer and poet
- Sára Kovářová (born 1999), Czech handballer for DHK Baník Most and the Czech national team
- Sára Nysted (born 2001), Faroese swimmer
- Sára Pusztai, Hungarian football player
- Sára Salkaházi (1899–1944), Hungarian nun
- Sára Szenteleki-Ligetkuti (born 1945), Hungarian middle-distance runner
- Sára Tóth (born 1993), Hungarian handball player
- Sára Vybíralová (born 1986), Czech writer

== Surname ==
- Sándor Sára (1933–2019), Hungarian cinematographer and film director
- Tímea Sára, birth name of Tímea Lőrincz (born 1992), Romanian cross-country skier

== See also ==
- Sarah (given name)
- Marie-Sára
