= Douglas Skinner =

Douglas Skinner may refer to:

- Douglas J. Skinner, accounting professor
- Douglas Reid Skinner (born 1949), South African writer, editor, translator and poet

== See also ==
- Doug Skinner (born 1955). American composer, writer, and performer
