= Liam Ezekiel =

American football player (born 1982)

No. 50, 59, 44
- Position: Linebacker

Personal information
- Born: October 30, 1982 (age 44); Arlington, Massachusetts, U.S.
- Listed height: 6 ft 0 in (1.83 m)
- Listed weight: 240 lb (109 kg)

Career information
- High school: Arlington
- College: Northeastern
- NFL draft: 2005: undrafted

Career history
- Buffalo Bills (2005); Nashville Kats (2007); Utah Blaze (2008)*; Chicago Rush (2008); Sacramento Mountain Lions (2009–2010)
- * Offseason or practice squad member only

Awards and highlights
- Third-team All-Atlantic 10 (2001); Third-team All-American (2002); James Thornton Memorial Award (2002); Chicken Lou Award winner (2002); 2× First-team AP All-American (2003–2004); First-team All-American (2003 Sports Network); 3× First-team All-Conference (2002–2004); 2× First-team All-Star (2003–2004 ECAC); 3× First-team All-Start (2002–2004 New England Football Writers); Second-team All-American (2004 Sports Network)

Career NFL statistics
- Total tackles: 2
- Stats at Pro Football Reference

Liam Ezekiel (born October 30, 1982) is an American former professional football player who was a linebacker in the National Football League (NFL). He was signed as an undrafted free agent by the Buffalo Bills in 2005. He played college football at Northeastern Huskies.

He also played for the Nashville Kats, Chicago Rush, and California Redwoods/Sacramento Mountain Lions.

== Early life ==
Ezekiel attended Arlington High School where he played hockey and lettered in football, basketball, and track. While in highschool Ezekiel received many accolades for his football performance. Ezekiel joined the All-State Select 22 team as a senior, became league all-start (as a sophomore, junior, and senior), and was proclaimed Team MVP. In addition to these honors Ezekiel was also named to the All-State team twice (during his junior and senior years) and was proclaimed All-Scholastic by the Boston Herald and Boston Globe.

While at Arlington High School Liam earned a school record of 28 tackles in a single game, and 147 tackles in one season. Ezekiel finished his high school career with a school-record 450 tackles.

== College career ==
Ezekiel attended Northeastern University, where he majored in Criminal Justice and was a member of the school's football team.

As a freshman in 2001, Ezekiel was originally going to play at Division I-A West Virginia, however he decided to attend Northeastern in the summer 2001. He was named Third-team All-Atlantic 10, the first player in school history to ever earn All-Conference honors as a freshman. In his freshman season, he missed the first two games, but played in the last nine. He finished the season second on the teams with 82 tackles, setting a school freshman record. His average of 9.1 tackles-per-game was the highest on the team and eighth best in the conference. In his first game, he replaced injured linebacker Joe Gazzola, and recorded 13 tackles to help lead the team to its first ever win over Delaware. Ezekiel later recorded a season-high 15 tackles and one sack to help lead Northeastern to its first conference shutout ever, a 7-0 win over Richmond.

As a sophomore in 2002, Ezekiel led the conference and was seventh in the nation (Division I-AA) with a school-record 145 tackles, an average of 11.2 tackles-per-game. He was a Sports Network Third-team All-American. He was also First-team All-Conference, a New England Writers All-Star, he was also named the conference's Defensive Player of the Week after recording a career-high 22 tackles (one short of the school's single-game record), on the road against Delaware. He recorded 22 tackles on the road against William & Mary to become the first player in school history to have two 20-tackle games in the same season. He also won the James M. Thornton Memorial Award as MVP of the Homecoming game, after recording 15 tackles, one forced fumble and two fumble recoveries against Villanova. He also returned his first-career interception 28 yards for a touchdown against James Madison. He played the last five weeks of the season with a broken thumb. For the season he recorded seven double-digit tackle games. He also won the Chicken Lou Award as the team's most aggressive player. Through just two seasons, Ezekiel had recorded 227 tackles, 20 short of the school's top 10.

As a junior in 2003, Ezekiel started all 12 games. He also received First-team All-America honors from both the Associated Press and Sports Network. He also earned First-team All-Conference, for the second straight year. He was also named a First-team All-Star by the ECAC and the New England Writers. He won the Atlantic 10 Co-Defensive Player of the Week honors after recording a season-high 19 tackles and returning an interception 40 yards against UMass. He finished the season fifth in the conference and 12th in the nation Division I-AA) in tackles-per-game with 11.7. He recorded 140 tackles, second most in school history, behind his total from the previous season. He also finished in a tie for ninth in the conference in sacks with 5.5. He recorded double-digit tackles in the last 11 games of the season. He also recorded a career-high two sacks against Rhode Island.

As a senior in 2004, Ezekiel appeared in and started 10 games. He earned First-team All-Conference for the third consecutive season. He also earned First-team All-America honors from the Associated Press and First-team All-America honors by the Sports Network. He was also named a First-team All-Star by the New England Football Writers and the ECAC. He was also a finalist for the Buck Buchanan Award and received The Bulger-Lowe Award as the best collegiate athlete in New England. He also appeared in the East-West Shrine Game in San Francisco, California, in which he recorded six tackles. He also led the conference and was sixth in the nation (Division I-AA) in tackles-per-game with 12.2. His 122 tackles finished fifth in the conference. Ezekiel finished his college career as Northeastern's all-time leader in tackles with 489. His career total placed him second in Division I-AA history.

== Professional career ==
=== Pre-draft ===
Ezekiel received an invitation to the NFL Scouting Combine. He was ranked as the 15th best inside linebacker out of 57., as well as the 308th best player out of 1,451 players in the draft. He was projected to be selected in the seventh round or go unselected.

NFL Combine measureables
Wt.	40-yard dash	20-yard short shuttle	3-cone drill	Vertical jump	Bench Press 225 lb. reps	Broad Jump
*249 lb.	*4.81	*4.12	*7.29	*34½"	*36	*9'10"

=== National Football League ===
Ezekiel went unselected in the 2005 NFL draft. However, he later signed as an undrafted free agent with the Buffalo Bills, where he made the final roster as a rookie and played for two seasons.

=== Arena Football League ===
After being released by the Bills, Ezekiel joined the Nashville Kats of the Arena Football League and played in all 16 games and recorded a team-leading 82.5 tackles, three for losses. He also recorded 1.5 sacks, two fumble recoveries, and one forced fumble. In October 2007, he was selected by the Utah Blaze with the eighth pick in the 2008 dispersal draft, but was released at the end of training camp. He then signed a one-year contract with the Chicago Rush and played in 15 games and recorded 32 tackles, one pass broken up, and two fumble recoveries.

=== United Football League ===
Ezekiel played two seasons under coach Dennis Green. Starting all games at Middle Linebacker and leading the team in tackles. Ezekiel retired after hip and back surgeries.
