= Jesus Calling =

2004 devotional book

- Author: Sarah Young
- Language: English
- Genre: Christian literature
- Publisher: HarperCollins
- Publication date: 2004
- Publication place: United States
- ISBN: 978-1-418-55591-7

Jesus Calling: Enjoying Peace in His Presence (2004) is a daily devotional book written by Christian author Sarah Young and published by Byron Williamson at Integrity Publishers, based in Brentwood, Tennessee. Two years later, in September 2006, Integrity, along with its catalog of books, including Jesus Calling, were bought by Thomas Nelson. The book offers readers a 365-day personal spiritual journey intended to help the reader experience a deeper relationship with Jesus. The book was inspired, in part, by Sarah Young's reading of a related book, God Calling, authored by A. J. Russell. According to Publishers Weekly, Jesus Calling had sold 45 million copies as of 2023.

Jesus Calling is also a Christian brand whose offerings include a quarterly magazine, a TV show, and a podcast.

== Author ==
Sarah Young had a degree in philosophy from Wellesley College; and earned a master's degree in biblical studies and counseling from Covenant Theological Seminary in St. Louis.

Young was a member of the Presbyterian Church in America (PCA), where her husband Stephen is an ordained minister and third-generation Christian missionary to Japan. The couple served as Mission to the World missionaries in Japan and Australia. As of 2018 they resided in the United States, where Young has two married children and two grandchildren.

Young has been described as a humble person who prefers to stay out of the spotlight. Young died on September 1, 2023, aged 77, following complications from Lyme disease.

== Impact ==
On April 25, 2015, Wisconsin Governor Scott Walker read from Jesus Calling to more than 1,000 people at the Iowa Faith & Freedom Coalition. A HarperCollins publicist said, "We had no idea Scott Walker had the book and would use it. It's always nice to hear about how Jesus Calling touched someone's life."

On June 27, 2017, Louisiana First Lady Donna Edwards delivered copies of Jesus Calling to women prisoners of the Louisiana Correctional Institute for Women. The books were donated by The Next Door, a non-profit organization that serves women in crisis and provides Jesus Calling devotionals free of charge to jails and prisons.

White House Press Secretary Sarah Huckabee Sanders read her leather-bound Jesus Calling daily devotional before press conferences.

== Other works ==
Other books written by Sarah Young include:

- Jesus Today – ECPA's 2013 Christian Book of the Year.
- Jesus Always – ECPA's 2018 Christian Book of the Year.
- Jesus Listens – ECPA Christian Best Sellers.

== Controversy ==
The devotional Jesus Calling has generated significant theological controversy within the evangelical Christian community, with concerns centered on its methodology, the nature of the 'Jesus' voice it employs, and its theological implications regarding the sufficiency of Scripture (sola Scriptura).

=== Methodology and alleged New Age influences ===
Critics have raised concerns about the process Sarah Young used to write the devotional.

In early editions of Jesus Calling, Young noted that she took inspiration from the 1930s devotional God Calling and its authors' practice of "waiting quietly in God's Presence, pencils and paper in hand, recording the messages they received from Him." Critics argue that this methodology closely resembles occult practices like automatic writing and channeling, characterizing it as an unbiblical and dangerous means of receiving spiritual messages.

- Brenna E. Scott (2024) created a hypothetical 50-stage 'channeling training course' by distilling steps used by various occultists to receive spirit messages, and then provided a side-by-side comparison illustrating the close resemblance between these channeling stages and the themes, wording, and practices found throughout the Jesus Calling series.
- Christian apologists Ankerberg and Weldon (1996) had previously identified God Calling as a New Age channeling book whose authors claimed to be receiving direct revelation from Jesus.
- Scott (2024) also compared quotations from Young's devotionals with quotations from God Calling, suggesting that "God Calling substantially influenced the writings of the Jesus Calling series".

Critics view the removal of the reference to God Calling in subsequent editions of Jesus Calling as an attempt to conceal the controversial influence, though the book's publicist reportedly said that it was merely to make the introduction easier to understand.

Furthermore, some critics assert that the content of Jesus Calling contains language and concepts that echo New Age beliefs such as "co-creation" and methods of psychic channeling such as "creative visualization", which they contend contradict biblical doctrine. Brenna E. Scott, in her analysis Christian Journalling or Psychic Channeling?, specifically details these connections, arguing that certain phrases used in the devotional series, such as "fifth dimension", "radio" (in reference to attuning spiritual frequencies), and "light-bearers", are not biblical terms but rather reflect Monist (the belief that "all is one") and Neo-pagan concepts antithetical to biblical Christianity. Scott (2024) argues that similar concerns apply to the whole Jesus Calling series including Dear Jesus, Jesus Always, Jesus Listens, Jesus Today and variants of these titles.

Additional Controversy (added Sept 2026): Her book may have been indirectly or directly "borrowed or copied" from the book, "God Calling" by AJ Russell, author of "God Calling" from the early 1930s. His book was written / revised by quoting two anonymous women channelers, who claimed to channel a direct message from God, via "quiet listening" : https://tottministries.org/another-jesus-calling-how-false-christs-are-entering-the-church-through-contemplative-prayer-by-warren-b-smith/

=== Use of the first-person voice of Jesus ===
The book’s format, written entirely in the first-person voice of Jesus speaking to the reader, is the central point of theological controversy. David Crump, professor of religion at Calvin College, stated in an interview with Christianity Today that Young "puts her thoughts into the first person and then presents that 'person' as the resurrected Lord".

While Young and her editors have denied that she believed she received original revelation from Jesus, explaining that Jesus Calling recounts what she learned through prayer and reading the Bible, critics point to statements in some editions that appear to suggest the writings are direct messages, such as: "The devotions in this book are some of the messages I have received," and, "This practice of listening to God has increased my intimacy with Him more than any other spiritual discipline, so I want to share some of the messages I have received."

Taking a sterner view, critic Warren B. Smith alleges that the "Jesus" of Young's devotional is a false christ or spirit impersonating the person of Christ, due both to the occultic methods he believes were used and content which he views as contradictory to the Bible. Smith further highlights messages that he considers unnaturally intrusive, citing phrases in the book such as: "Let Me control your mind" and "My main work is to clear out debris and clutter, making room for My Spirit to take full possession." Smith argues that such language seeks control over the reader in a way that aligns with a deceptive spirit.

=== Investigation ===
In June 2024, the Presbyterian Church in America (PCA), of which Young was a member, launched an investigation into the book, in order to "assess the book’s appropriateness for Christians in general and PCA members and congregations in particular with special regard for its doctrine and method." The subsequent investigation was complicated by reports in 2025 that PCA agencies had received hundreds of thousands of dollars in royalties from the book, leading some commentators to discuss a potential financial conflict of interest in the reporting process.

=== Response ===
Stephen Young, Sarah Young's husband, has vigorously defended her work, affirming that his late wife was a faithful Christian who loved Jesus and sought to point people to the Bible. He argued that his wife was a "humble servant" whose writings were merely "meditations"—not new Scripture—written in the first-person voice of Jesus to help readers feel a closer connection to Him. He asserted that Young would "stand with Martin Luther and declare that her conscience was captive to the Word of God," and that her writings were intended to "explain" Scripture, not add to it. Furthermore, he and his daughter denied claims of automatic writing, maintaining that the book's funds were dedicated to supporting Christian charitable work and missions.

Despite the theological controversy, the book remains a global best-seller, having sold over 45 million units worldwide.

== See also ==
- Christian literature
- Christian devotional literature
- Spiritual disciplines
