= Catherine M. Schrand =

American academic

Catherine M. Schrand is an American academic and the Celia Z. Moh Professor of Accounting at the Wharton School at the University of Pennsylvania.

== Early career ==
Schrand earned her BBA from the University of Michigan in 1985. She has an M.B.A. (1993) and a Ph.D. (1994) from the University of Chicago. Prior to earning her Ph.D., Schrand worked at KPMG Peat Marwick and served as a staff auditor and audit manager.

Schrand has taught doctoral and undergraduates in financial accounting and currently serves as an associate editor of the Journal of Accounting and Economics.

== Research ==
Schrand is widely recognized for co-authoring Understanding earnings quality: A review of the proxies, their determinants and their consequences along with Patricia Dechow and Weili Ge. Her research focuses primarily on risk management, disclosure and equity financing. Her graduate student, Sarah Zechman, led work showing how accounting fraud emerges full bloom from small initial misstatements by managers who are overconfident of their firms' prospects.

== Selected publications ==
- Minton, Bernadette A.; Schrand, Catherine (1999). "The impact of cash flow volatility on discretionary investment and the costs of debt and equity financing". Journal of Financial Economics. 54 (3): 423–460. doi:10.1016/S0304-405X(99)00042-2.
- Dechow, Patricia; Ge, Weili; Schrand, Catherine (2010-12-01). "Understanding earnings quality: A review of the proxies, their determinants and their consequences". Journal of Accounting and Economics. 50 (2): 344–401. doi:10.1016/j.jacceco.2010.09.001. ISSN 0165-4101. Archived from the original on September 28, 2025.
- Schrand, Catherine M.; Zechman, Sarah L. C. (2012). "Executive overconfidence and the slippery slope to financial misreporting". Journal of Accounting and Economics. 53 (1): 311–329. doi:10.1016/j.jacceco.2011.09.001. ISSN 0165-4101. S2CID 27325383.
- Géczy, Christopher; Minton, Bernadette A.; Schrand, Catherine (1997). "Why Firms Use Currency Derivatives". The Journal of Finance. 52 (4): 1323–1354. doi:10.1111/j.1540-6261.1997.tb01112.x.

== Awards and honors ==
Zechman received the Best Paper Award from the American Accounting Association's Financial Accounting and Reporting Section in 2020 for her paper Run EDGAR Run:SEC dissemination in a high frequency world.
