= Arlington High School (Massachusetts) =

High school in Arlington, Massachusetts

Coordinates: 42°25′4.5″N 71°9′42.2″W

Location
- 869 Massachusetts Avenue; Arlington, Massachusetts 02476; United States

Information
- Type: Public high school
- Established: 1922
- Principal: Matthew Janger
- Teaching staff: 122.99 (FTE)
- Grades: 9–12
- Enrollment: 1,609 (2023-2024)
- Student to teacher ratio: 13.08
- Colors: Maroon, gray, and white
- Song: "Red and white, lets go fight."
- Team name: Spy Ponders (formerly Indians, Trojans, Red and Gray)
- Rival: Waltham High School
- Accreditation: New England Association of Schools and Colleges
- Newspaper: The Ponder Page
- Yearbook: Spy Ponder (formerly The Indian)
- Website: ahs.arlington.k12.ma.us

Arlington High School is a public high school located in Arlington, Massachusetts. As of 2024, the school enrolled 1,609 students.

In 2019, a town vote approved the phased construction of a new Arlington High School on the footprint of the existing campus. Site work began in 2020, with Phase 1 completed in 2023. The entire project, slated for completion by September 2025, is budgeted at $291 million.

Arlington High has fared well in national school comparisons; in U.S. News' 2024 rankings, it ranked 773rd of 17,655 American public high schools and 31st of 405 in Massachusetts.

== History ==
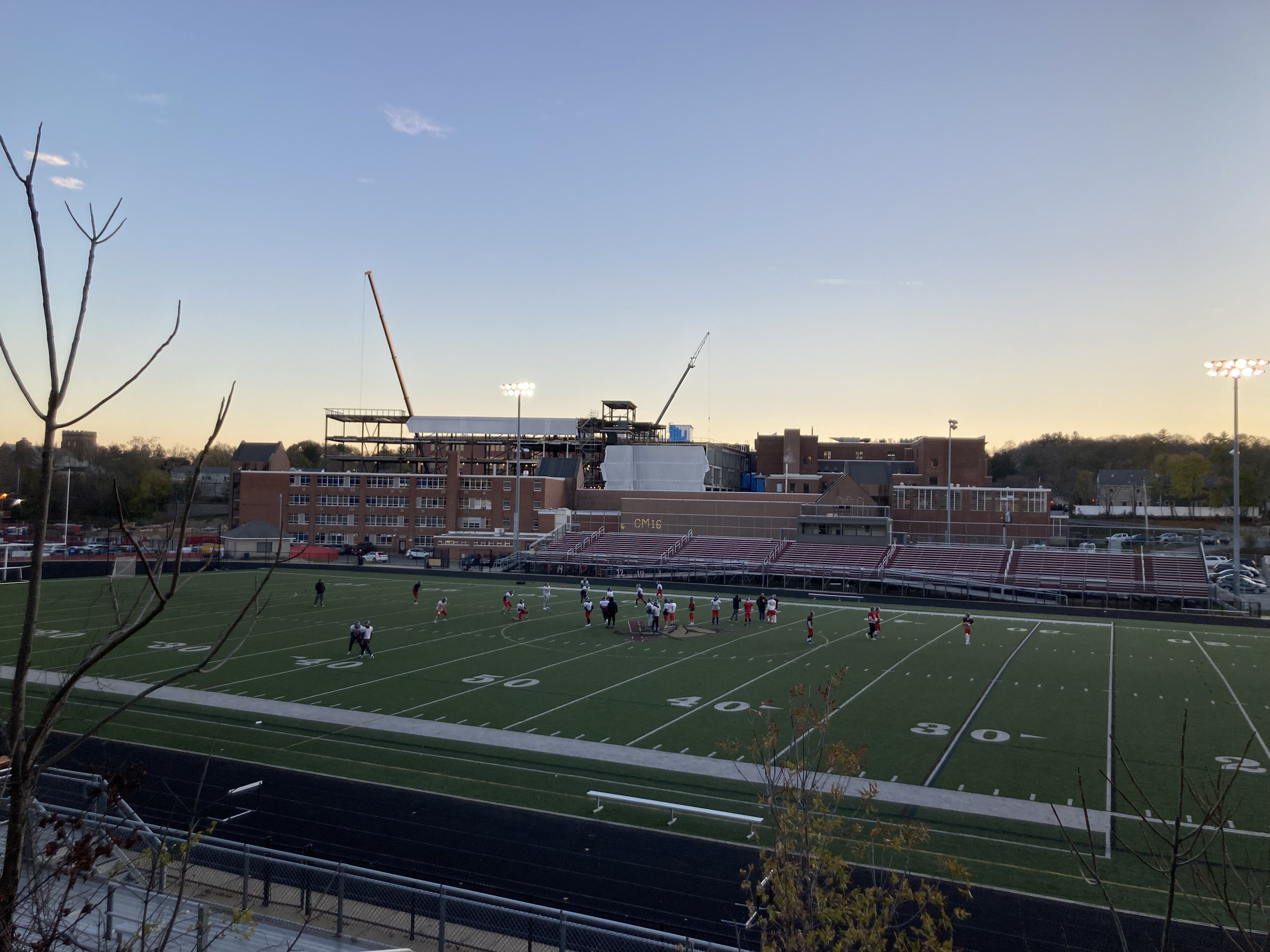
Pierce Field with the under-construction school in the background, 2022

Arlington's first high school, named Cotting Academy and then Cotting High School, was built in 1858 on what is still named Academy Street. It stood at 19 Academy, on the location of what is now the Arlington Masonic Temple.

In 1894, the town built a new Arlington High School across the street from its predecessor, at 20 Academy. That building has been repurposed for the Arlington Center for the Arts and other community organizations.

The Arlington High School currently being replaced was designed by Howard B.S. Prescott. Construction began in 1914 and it opened in 1915 for grades 10–12. The original building was later known as Fusco House; boys and girls were required to use separate entrances. Two later additions became known as Collomb House (1937) and Downs House (1964). Some parts of the school were renovated in 1981.

Peirce Field, an outdoor field for football, soccer, track, field hockey, lacrosse, baseball and softball, was created by filling in "Cutter's Pond", which had been previously used for milling. Mill Brook still runs underneath the high school to this day. The field was renovated in 2004 due to toxin levels in the soil. This toxicity stemmed from a company located where the Department of Public Works is currently situated. A settlement was reached with the company to pay for the entire cleaning, capping, and renovation.

In 2010, Arlington High School attracted national attention after it declined a student's request to make reciting the Pledge of Allegiance mandatory.

== Athletics ==
For many years, Arlington High's athletic teams were known as the Indians or the Red and Gray, the school's colors and the name of its fight song. For a time in the 1970s, "Trojans" was adopted as the nickname. But in the 1980s, the school settled on a name that had been used informally for decades, the Spy Ponders — named for the local Spy Pond and often shortened to the Ponders.

While the school has not used the "Indians" name for decades, its school logo included a Native American man until 2020. The figure, modeled on The Menotomy Hunter, a Cyrus E. Dallin sculpture located in Arlington Center, was the subject of protest, leading to its temporary replacement with a simple "A" logo. The "A" logo was replaced with the school's new mascot Cyrus in 2024.

Arlington High fields teams in alpine skiing, baseball, basketball, cross country, e-sports, field hockey, football, golf, gymnastics, ice hockey, indoor and outdoor track, lacrosse, soccer, softball, swimming, tennis, volleyball, and wrestling.

== Notable alumni ==
- Ralph Bevins, Boston University hockey goaltender, Most Outstanding Player in the 1950 NCAA men's ice hockey championship
- Paul Boudreau, NFL offensive line coach
- Noel Buck, professional soccer player
- Jack Canniff, 1972 national college ice hockey coach of the year
- Dane Cook, stand-up comedian
- Jim Driscoll, former Oakland Athletics and Texas Rangers infielder
- Olympia Dukakis, Oscar-winning actress
- Liam Ezekiel, former NFL linebacker
- Sylvia Field, actress known for Dennis the Menace
- Sean Garballey, Massachusetts state representative
- Alan Hovhaness, composer
- Sarah Kamya, founder of the Little Free Diverse Library project
- John A. Kelley, two-time Boston Marathon winner
- Bulger Lowe, NFL player for the Canton Bulldogs, Cleveland Indians, Providence Steam Roller, and Frankford Yellow Jackets
- Alton Marsters, all-America football player at Dartmouth
- Elaine J. McCarthy, projection and scenic designer for Broadway and opera
- John Messuri, hockey player and coach
- Mark Preston, CNN senior political analyst
- Miles Robinson, professional soccer player
- Louis W. Ross, architect
- Howard S. Russell, Massachusetts state legislator
- Dave "Chico" Ryan, member of Sha Na Na
- Bill Squires, coach of the Greater Boston Track Club
- Carl Sumner, former Boston Red Sox outfielder
- Alan "Blind Owl" Wilson, guitarist and songwriter of Canned Heat
- Bob Wilson, longtime play-by-play announcer for the Boston Bruins
- John W. Walsh, real estate executive and founder of the COPD Foundation
- Peter Zebbler Berdovsky, visual artist
- Amanda Cochrane, member of the Vermont House of Representatives
