= Sarah Armstrong-Smith =

- Citizenship: British
- Occupation: Chief information security officer
- Years active: 1995–present
- Employer: Microsoft
- Known for: Cybersecurity expert
- Notable work: Effective Crisis Management: A Robust A-Z Guide for Demonstrating Resilience by Utilizing Best Practices, Case Studies, and Experiences (2022); Understand the Cyber Attacker Mindset: Build a Strategic Security Programme to Counteract Threats(2024)
- Honours: Most Inspirational Women in Cyber UK (2020); SC Media’s Top 30 Female Cybersecurity Leaders (2022); Cyber Security Hub's Top 20 Cyber Security Movers & Shakers (2022); Computer Weekly, Influential women in UK technology (2023); Women in CyberSecurity, Top 25 Leaders in Cyber Security (2024)

Sarah Armstrong-Smith is a British Chief information security officer who serves as Chief Security Advisor for Europe, the Middle East and Africa (EMEA) at Microsoft. She is a Fellow of the British Computer Society and a published author.

== Career ==
Armstrong-Smith began her career in the mid-1990s. In 1995 she held a position at PHH Arval as a fraud controller. She then worked as a business continuity analyst at Thames Water. At this period she was involved in working on the Year 2000 problem (the Millennium) transition. In 2001 she was appointed Disaster Recovery Manager at AXA and subsequently held the position of Manager, Technology Risk Services at Ernst & Young.

Following these roles, Armstrong-Smith spent approximately eleven years at Fujitsu. She joined Fujitsu as Chief Consultant on Cyber Security and progressed through roles including Management Consultant (Enterprise & Cyber Security), Engineer and Head of Continuity & Resilience, Enterprise & Cyber Security. In 2019, she took on the role of Group Head of Business Resilience & Crisis Management at the London Stock Exchange Group and took on a non-executive directorship at Decipher Cyber.

=== Microsoft ===
In 2020, she joined Microsoft as Chief Security Advisor for EMEA, where she influence security practice, provides strategic guidance on cybersecurity, compliance, and organisational resilience. With her background in crisis management and disaster recovery, she has driven initiatives that strengthen businesses against cyber attacks and large-scale disruptions. In her role, Armstrong-Smith partners with enterprise customers to design security strategies to meet regulatory demands but also address the realities of an evolving threat landscape.

== Recognition ==
Armstrong-Smith has received industry recognition. Which include being listed among The Most Inspirational Women in Cyber UK (2020) and being named to SC Media’s Top 30 Female Cybersecurity Leaders (2022), She was also included on Cyber Security Hub’s inaugural Top 20 Cyber Security Movers and Shakers (2022), featured on Computer Weekly lists of influential women in UK technology (2023), and recognised by Women in Cybersecurity as one of the Top 25 Leaders in Cyber Security (2024).

== Books ==
- Effective Crisis Management: A Robust A-Z Guide for Demonstrating Resilience by Utilizing Best Practices, Case Studies, and Experiences (2022)
- Understand the Cyber Attacker Mindset: Build a Strategic Security Programme to Counteract Threats (2024)
