= John W. Walsh =

American NGO leader and patient advocate, 1949–2017

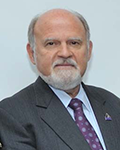
- John W. Walsh in 2012
- Born: February 4, 1949; Arlington, Massachusetts
- Died: March 7, 2017 (aged 68); Miami, Florida
- Organization(s): Alpha-1 Foundation; AlphaNet; COPD Foundation
- Website: alpha1.org alphanet.org copdfoundation.org

John W. Walsh (February 4, 1949 – March 7, 2017) was an American non-profit leader and patient advocate. After being diagnosed with alpha-1 antitrypsin deficiency, he co-founded the Alpha-1 Foundation and AlphaNet, both of which serve people diagnosed with that condition, and the COPD Foundation, which serves people with chronic obstructive pulmonary disease. As an advocate for alpha-1 and COPD patients, Walsh lobbied before Congress for increased research funding and medical benefits for patients, and served on a number of health-related committees and organizations.

== Early life ==
John Waldo Walsh, IV was born on February 4, 1949, in Arlington, Massachusetts. He was one of four children, along with a twin brother, Fred, and two sisters, Susan and Judith. When John was 13 his mother died from chronic obstructive pulmonary disease, likely caused by undiagnosed alpha-1 antitrypsin deficiency (alpha-1), at age 46.

Walsh became an Eagle Scout, attended Arlington High School – where he was president of his class – and New Hampton School, then enrolled at Norwich University. He left Norwich prior to graduation to work as an aide at the United States Senate, then served as an Army Ranger as part of the Army Special Forces Reserve. Prior to his diagnosis with alpha-1, he had a successful career in real estate, including founding and leading two companies, AMSTOR and Hometron.

== Non-profit work and honors ==
When they were 35, both John and Fred began having chronic asthma symptoms, which worsened over time and resulted in hospitalizations. In 1989, a half-decade later, Fred was diagnosed with alpha-1 antitrypsin deficiency, a rare genetic disorder that can lead to COPD and liver damage. John and one of his two sisters were diagnosed with alpha-1 shortly after. This information came after years of the Walshes being misdiagnosed as having asthma. At the time, less than 5,000 people had been diagnosed with alpha-1. John and his brother joined the Longitudinal Progressive Disease Study, administered by the National Institutes of Health, which ran through 1995 and ended in the development of a protein replacement therapy treatment. During the study, Walsh and others formed support groups and Walsh developed materials to educate people about alpha-1 antitrypsin deficiency.

Following the conclusion of the study, Walsh and two other alpha-1 patients – Susan Stanley and Sandy Linsey – founded the Alpha-1 Foundation, a research focused non-profit. Later that year he founded a sister-nonprofit, AlphaNet, which provides health management services to alpha-1 patients. Under his leadership, the Alpha-1 Foundation was able to establish a network of research centers and a patient registry, support 80 alpha-1 patient support groups, and contribute over $50 million towards research. The organization also created a test kit that allows individuals to find out whether they have alpha-1 without the test or results being exposed to the insurance industry.

In an interview with the European Lung Foundation, Walsh noted that one of the Alpha-1 Foundation's goals was to increase detection of alpha-1. In the pursuit of this effort, Walsh came to the conclusion that, like alpha-1, COPD was also under-diagnosed and research for it was underfunded. In 2004 Walsh co-founded the COPD Foundation, a research, education, and advocacy non-profit serving individuals with chronic obstructive pulmonary disease. Representing the COPD Foundation, John and other non-profit leaders developed the first patient-powered research networks, an initiative funded by the Patient Protection and Affordable Care Act.

As an advocate for alpha-1 and COPD patients, Walsh served on the National Institutes of Health's Council of Patient Representatives, Council of Councils, the National Institute of Diabetes and Digestive and Kidney Diseases Advisory Council, the Department of Health and Human Services Advisory Committee on Blood Safety, and the American Thoracic Society Public Advisory Roundtable, the latter of which he chaired.^{:481} He testified before the United States Congress on numerous occasions. In 2004, he and his brother testified before an appropriations subcommittee on behalf of the Alpha-1 Foundation to request funds for the Centers for Disease Control for alpha-1 detection and funds for the National Heart, Lung, and Blood Institute to investigate alpha-1 therapies.^{:477} In 2007 he and the executive director of the American Association for Respiratory Care appeared before Congress to request that Medicare cover pulmonary rehabilitation.

In 2002 he received the Commissioner's Special Citation from the Food and Drug Administration.^{:481} In 2008, the American Thoracic Society awarded Walsh their Public Service Award. In 2014, the National Organization of Rare Disorders recognized Walsh with their Lifetime Achievement Award. That same year Walsh was chosen to serve on the board of directors of the National Health Council, an association of health-related organizations and patient advocacy groups, and he served as the chair of their board in 2016. Following his death, the American Thoracic Society renamed their Public Advisory Roundtable Excellence Award in his honor.

In January 2016, Walsh sustained a brain injury after slipping on a patch of ice in Washington, D.C. He died of complications from that injury on March 7, 2017.
