= Warren Hoge =

American journalist (1941–2023)

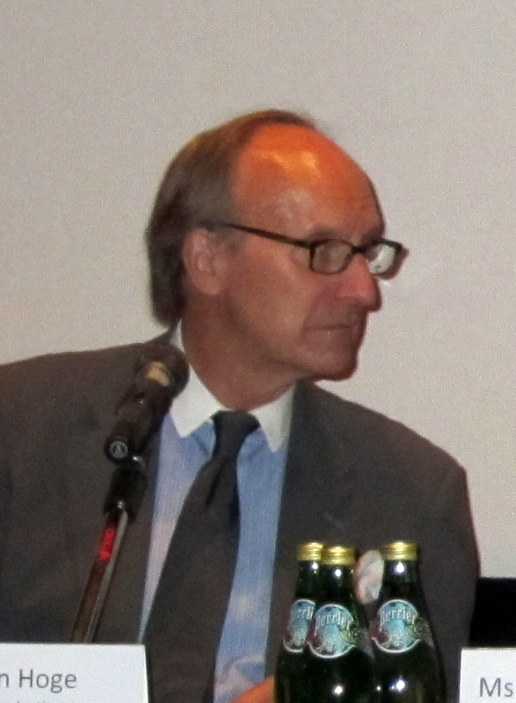
- Hoge in 2014
- Born: Warren McClamroch Hoge; April 13, 1941; New York City, U.S.
- Died: August 23, 2023 (aged 82); New York City, U.S.
- Education: Trinity School; Yale University
- Occupation: Journalist
- Notable credit(s): The New York Times, New York Post, The Washington Star
- Spouse: Olivia Larisch
- Children: 3
- Relatives: James F. Hoge Jr. (brother)

Warren McClamroch Hoge (April 13, 1941 – August 23, 2023) was an American journalist, much of whose long career was at The New York Times.

== Life and career ==
Born in Manhattan on April 13, 1941, Hoge is the son of James F. Hoge, Sr. (1901–72) and Virginia McClamroch Hoge. His elder brother was James F. Hoge Jr., former editor of Foreign Affairs, a publication of the Council on Foreign Relations. A sister who was the eldest Hoge sibling, Barbara Hoge Daine, died in 2001. The youngest sibling is Virginia Howe Hoge.

Hoge was an alumnus of the Trinity School and Yale University. He also undertook graduate studies at George Washington University. He served in the U.S. Army in 1964, and in the Army Reserves from 1965 to 1970.

Hoge's journalism career began as a reporter with the now-defunct Washington Star from 1964 to 1966.

From 1966 to 1969, he was Washington, D.C., bureau chief for the New York Post, then the Post's city editor and metropolitan editor until 1976.

Hoge's first posts at The New York Times included metropolitan news reporter, regional editor, and deputy metropolitan news editor (1976–79). With the foreign bureau he had chief posts in Rio de Janeiro (1979–83) and London (1996–2003). Hoge was the foreign news editor from 1984 to 1987, assistant managing editor from 1987 to 1996; and editor of The New York Times Magazine in 1991–92. From 2004 until mid-2008, he served as the Times 's foreign correspondent at the United Nations bureau.

In July 2008 Hoge left The New York Times to become the vice president for external relations at the International Peace Institute, a New York-based think tank.

== Personal life and death ==
On November 21, 1981, in Rio de Janeiro, Brazil, Hoge married Countess Olivia Larisch von Moennich, an interior designer, who had previously been married to Count Andreas Herbert Alexander von Bismarck-Schönhausen. She is a daughter of Count Johann Larisch von Moennich and his first wife, Countess Wilhelmine Schaffgotsch. By this marriage, Hoge had two stepdaughters, Countess Tatjana (Mrs Kurt Leimer) and Countess Christina von Bismarck-Schönhausen (Mrs Guy du Boulay Villax), and a son, actor Nicholas Hoge.

Warren Hoge died from pancreatic cancer on August 23, 2023, at the age of 82.

== See also ==
- James Hoge Tyler – Hoge's first cousin twice-removed, who wrote a genealogy of the family, The Family of Hoge, published in 1927.
