= Sarah Kamya =

African-American school counselor

- Education: New York University; Syracuse University
- Occupation: School counselor

Sarah Kamya is an African-American school counselor in New York City who started the Little Free Diverse Library project.

== Early life and education ==
Kamya was raised in "largely white and affluent" Arlington, Massachusetts, "without often being exposed to books with characters who looked like her", according to School Library Journal. She graduated from Arlington High School in 2013. She received degrees from Syracuse University (2017) and New York University.

== Little Free Diverse Library ==
Kamya launched the Little Free Diverse Library initiative, which seeks to add books written by Black authors or featuring Black characters to Little Free Libraries throughout New York City. She started the project in Massachusetts in 2020, during the COVID-19 pandemic and following the murder of George Floyd. After she moved to Manhattan, she added books to the Little Free Library at Freeman Plaza West in July 2020; by September, she had raised $16,000 for the initiative and purchased approximately 1,500 books from Black-owned bookstores. The Little Free Diverse Library project became active in all fifty U.S. states. Kamya has raised thousands of dollars for the project, including $5,000 from Live with Kelly and Ryan, when she was featured as a "helping hero" on the program. NY1 named Kamya a "New Yorker of the Week" in 2020 for her efforts. She also received the Little Free Library's Todd H. Bol Award for Outstanding Achievement in 2021.

== Personal life ==
Originally from Arlington, Kamya lives in Hudson Square, as of 2020.

== See also ==
- List of New York University alumni
- List of Syracuse University people
