= Sarah Zechman =

Professor of business

- Born: Sarah Louise Center

Academic background
- Education: Wharton School of the University of Pennsylvania
- Thesis: The relation between voluntary disclosure and financial reporting: Evidence from synthetic leases (2008)

Sarah Louise Zechman (née Center) is the Tisone Memorial Fellow Professor at the Leeds School of Business, University of Colorado Boulder.

== Education and career ==
Zechman earned a BSBA in accounting in 1998 from Washington University in St. Louis, Missouri. She then worked at KPMG until 2003 when she went to the Wharton School of the University of Pennsylvania where she earned her Ph.D. in 2008. From 2008 until 2015 she was at the University of Chicago Booth School of Business. In 2015 she joined the faculty of the Leeds School of Business at the University of Colorado, where she was promoted to professor in 2018. As of 2022 she is the Tisone Memorial Fellow Professor.

== Research ==
Zechman studies how firms use disclosure and financial reporting to communicate with financial markets and other external users such as lenders, customers, and regulators about important topics including past firm performance, future expectations, and risks. Her work studies the interplay between mandatory disclosures in financial statements and voluntary disclosures made by managers to reveal or hide information from the market. With Catherine Schrand she has shown how accounting fraud emerges full bloom from small initial misstatements by managers who are overconfident of their firms' prospects. With Jonathan Rogers and Douglas Skinner, Zechman has studied the role of media in affecting stock prices and in exacerbating or leveling insider trading advantages in comparison with the average investor. Their paper "Run Edgar Run" exposed an unintentional advantage that the U.S. Securities and Exchange Commission was giving large-paying subscribers by giving them access to insider trading information by a matter of seconds before the general market, leading to a trading advantage for those paying subscribers of 28 basis points over an 81 second period. After becoming aware of this research, the Chair and Ranking Member of the US Senate's Committee on Banking, Housing, and Urban Affairs formally requested the SEC to investigate its practices for making the information public. The SEC conducted an internal investigation and subsequently changed its procedures to eliminate the trading advantage. Zechman has also studied the employment market for ex-CEOs of publicly traded companies.

== Selected publications ==
- Rogers, Jonathan L.; Van Buskirk, Andrew; Zechman, Sarah L. C. (2011-11-01). "Disclosure Tone and Shareholder Litigation". The Accounting Review. 86 (6): 2155–2183. doi:10.2308/accr-10137. ISSN 0001-4826.
- Schrand, Catherine M.; Zechman, Sarah L. C. (2012). "Executive overconfidence and the slippery slope to financial misreporting". Journal of Accounting and Economics. 53 (1): 311–329. doi:10.1016/j.jacceco.2011.09.001. ISSN 0165-4101. S2CID 27325383.
- Rogers, Jonathan L.; Skinner, Douglas J.; Zechman, Sarah L. C. (2016). "The role of the media in disseminating insider-trading news". Review of Accounting Studies. 21 (3): 711–739. doi:10.1007/s11142-016-9354-2. ISSN 1380-6653. S2CID 254980729.
- Rogers, Jonathan L.; Skinner, Douglas J.; Zechman, Sarah L. C. (2017). "Run EDGAR Run: SEC Dissemination in a High-Frequency World". Journal of Accounting Research. 55 (2): 459–505. doi:10.1111/1475-679X.12167. ISSN 1475-679X.

== Awards and honros ==
Zechman received the Best Paper Award from the American Accounting Association's Financial Accounting and Reporting Section in 2015 for her paper Executive Overconfidence and the Slippery Slope to Financial Misreporting and was awarded again in 2020 for her paper Run EDGAR Run:SEC dissemination in a high frequency world.
