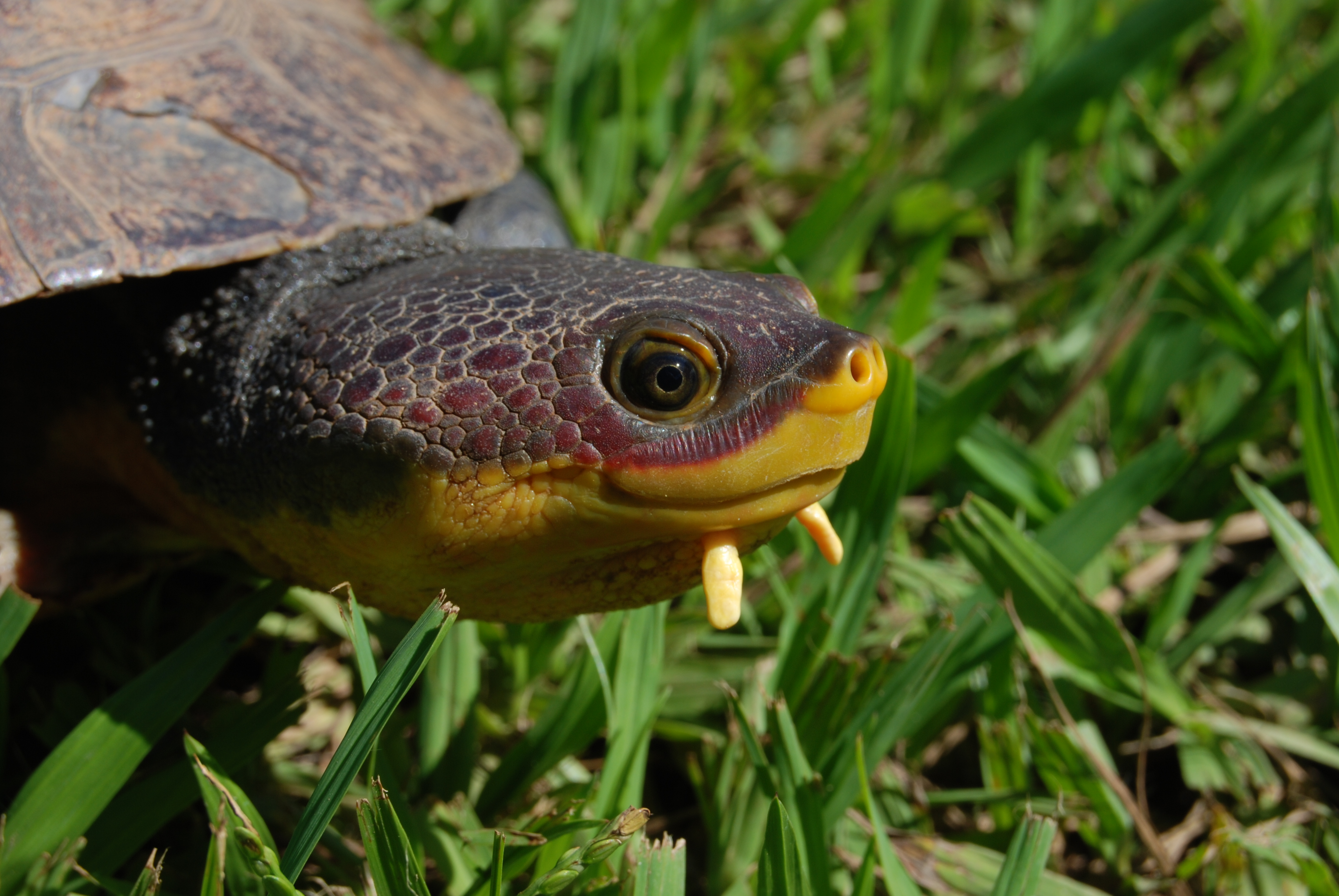

Conservation status
- Critically Endangered (IUCN 3.1)

Scientific classification
- Kingdom: Animalia
- Phylum: Chordata
- Class: Reptilia
- Order: Testudines
- Suborder: Pleurodira
- Family: Chelidae
- Subfamily: Chelinae
- Genus: Ranacephala; McCord, Joseph-Ouni & Lamar, 2001
- Species: R. hogei

Binomial name
- Ranacephala hogei (Mertens, 1967)

Synonyms
- Phrynops hogei Mertens, 1967; Mesoclemmys hogei — Cabrera, 1998; Ranacephala hogei — McCord, Joseph-Ouni & Lamar, 2001

= Hoge's side-necked turtle =

Species of side necked turtle

Hoge's sideneck turtle (Ranacephala hogei) is a species of turtle in the family Chelidae. It is the only member of the genus Ranacephala. The species is endemic to the eastern Atlantic Forest of Brazil, primarily in the Carangola River of Minas Gerais and Paraíba do Sul River, Rio de Janeiro. The most documented population resides in the midsection of the Carangola River with an estimated population of less than 2000.

The Official Brazilian Red List considers Hoge's sideneck turtle to be the most endangered turtle species within Brazil. It was listed by the Turtle Survival Coalition as one of the world "25 Turtles in Trouble" for 2018.

== Etymology ==
The specific name, hogei, is in honor of Brazilian-born Belgian herpetologist Alphonse Richard Hoge.

== Threats ==
The primary threat to the ongoing survival of R. hogei is habitat degradation owing to ongoing deforestation, sewage and industrial discharge, agricultural pollution, and dam construction. Another major concern is direct mortality from sports fishing, hooks with a lower threat level to turtles has been promoted in recent years, as well as two designated no-fishing zones being established along the Carangola River.

Genetic studies have also shown R. hogei to have very low levels of genetic diversity, most likely owing to a population bottleneck in the past. This makes the species particularly vulnerable to disease, and potentially unable to adapt to a changing environment as well as other species.

== Conservation ==
In 2015, 236 acres of critically important nesting habitat along the Carangola River were purchased by Rainforest Trust, working alongside Fundação Biodiversitas, for $614 an acre. This was designated a permanent private protected area as outlined by the Brazilian National System of Conservation Units. R. hogei relies upon intact closed canopy rainforest for nesting, hence the agricultural practice of clearing forests to the river's edge is very damaging to the species. The Rainforest Trust also thanks the TSA (Turtle Survival Alliance), and the Wildlife Conservation Society for their help in the creation of the Hoge's Side-necked Turtle Reserve.

In 2014 an environmental education program was created featuring the Hoge's sideneck turtle, complete with an educational video and teachers guide material.
