= Sarah Poncio =

Brazilian politician (born 1997)

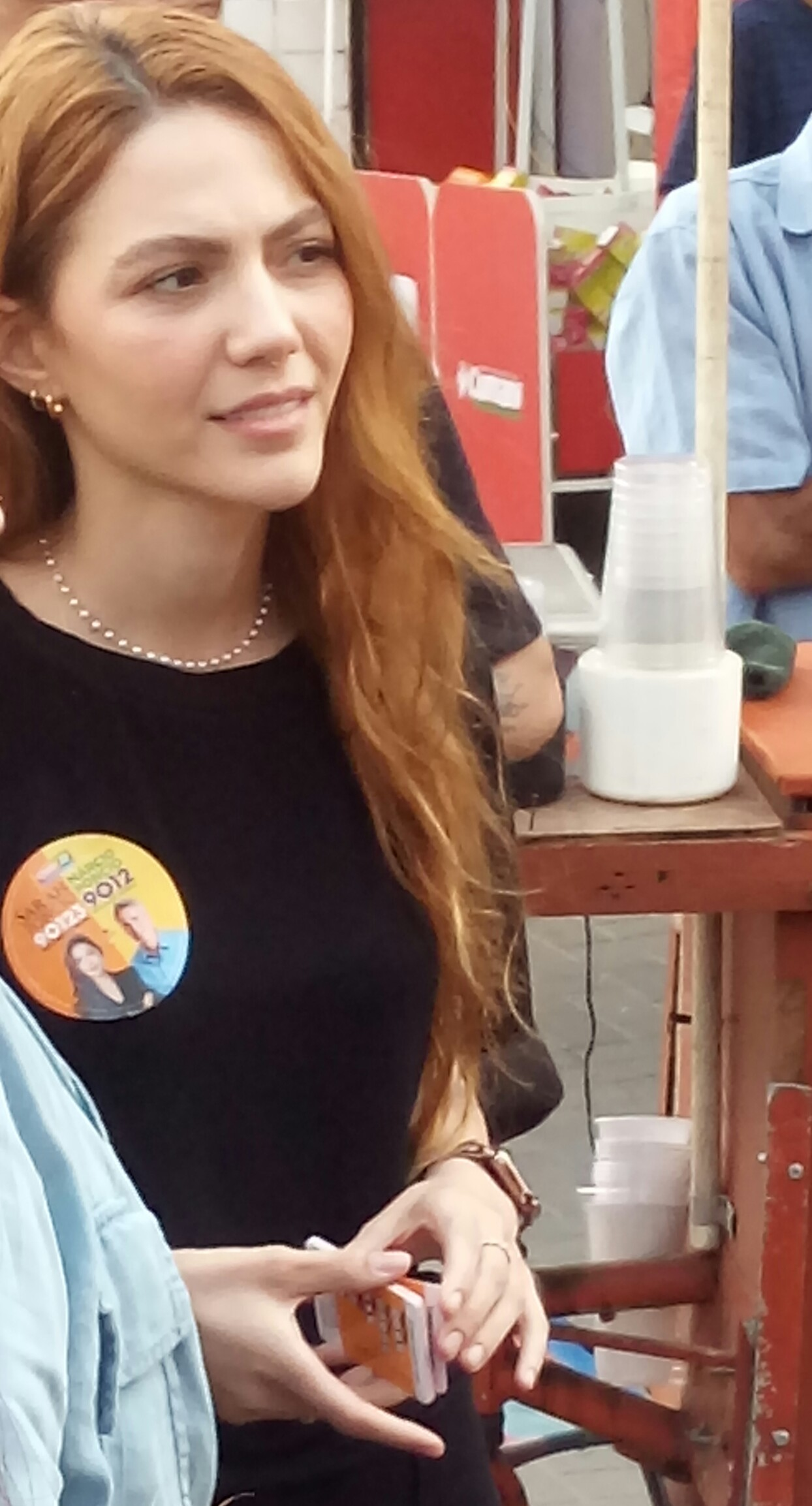
- Poncio in 2022

Member of the Legislative Assembly of Rio de Janeiro
- Incumbent
- Assumed office 1 January 2025
- Preceded by: Tande Vieira

Personal details
- Born: 7 July 1997 (age 29)
- Party: Solidarity (since 2023)
- Relatives: Saulo Poncio (brother)

Sarah Poncio Silva de Souza (born 7 July 1997) is a Brazilian politician and Internet personality serving as a member of the Legislative Assembly of Rio de Janeiro since 2025. As of 2025, she has 3.6 million followers on Instagram. She is the sister of Saulo Poncio.
