= William Hoge =

William Hoge may refer to:

- William Hoge (Pennsylvania politician) (1762–1814), U.S. Representative from Pennsylvania
- William Hoge (California politician) (1946–2025), member of the California State Assembly
- William M. Hoge (1894–1979), United States Army general
