= Sarah Flaxmer =

English religious polemicist (fl. 1790s)

Sarah Flaxmer (fl. 1790s) was an English religious polemicist and self-proclaimed prophetess.

== History ==
Flaxmer was a religious polemicist and self-proclaimed prophetess, who proclaimed that she was a herald of the second coming. She was the author of Satan revealed; or the dragon overcome. With an explanation of the twelfth chapter of the Revelations. And also, a testimony that Richard Brothers, is a prophet sent from the Lord, published in 1795.

In the work, Flaxmer argued that Satan "knowing that a Woman was to reveal him, has endeavoured to lessen the character of women." She was inspired by Revelation 12.

Flaxmer also interpreted recent military defeats, such as the British Army's 1795 evacuation from Bremen during the War of the First Coalition, in the light of apocalyptic prophecies from the Book of Revelation.

Flaxmer was a poor woman living in London lodgings. Her dates of birth and death are unknown.

== See also ==
- Elspeth Buchan
- Joanna Southcott
