= Foreign Affairs =

American academic journal

- Cover of the September/October 2023 issue of Foreign Affairs
- Editor: Daniel Kurtz-Phelan
- Categories: Political science, foreign affairs, and economics
- Frequency: Bimonthly
- Circulation: 195,016
- Publisher: Council on Foreign Relations
- Founded: September 15, 1922; 104 years ago
- Country: United States
- Language: English
- Website: www.foreignaffairs.com
- ISSN: 0015-7120

Foreign Affairs is an American journal of international relations and U.S. foreign policy, published by the Council on Foreign Relations, a nonprofit, nonpartisan, membership organization and think tank specializing in U.S. foreign policy and international affairs. Founded on 15 September 1922, the print magazine is published every two months, while the website publishes articles daily and anthologies every other month.

Foreign Affairs is considered one of the United States' most influential and prestigious foreign-policy magazines. It has published many highly influential articles, including George Kennan's "X Article" (1947) and Samuel P. Huntington's "The Clash of Civilizations" (1993).

Leading academics, public officials, and members of the policy community regularly contribute to the magazine.

== History ==
The Council on Foreign Relations, founded in the summer of 1921, primarily counted diplomats, financiers, scholars, and lawyers among its members. Its founding charter declared its purpose should be to "afford a continuous conference on international questions affecting the United States, by bringing together experts on statecraft, finance, industry, education, and science." In its first year, the Council engaged primarily in discourse via meetings and small discussion groups, however, eventually it decided to seek a wider audience and it began publishing Foreign Affairs on 15 September 1922 on a quarterly basis.

The Council named Professor Archibald Cary Coolidge of Harvard University as the journal's first editor. As Coolidge was unwilling to move from Boston to New York, Hamilton Fish Armstrong, a Princeton alumnus and a European correspondent of the New York Evening Post, was appointed managing editor and worked New York, handling the day-to-day mechanics of publishing the journal. Armstrong chose the distinctive light blue color for the cover of the magazine, while his sisters, Margaret and Helen, designed the logo and lettering respectively.

Foreign Affairs is a successor publication of the Journal of International Relations (which ran from 1910 to 1922), which in turn was a successor to the Journal of Race Development (which ran from 1911 to 1919, the title reflecting concerns about race tensions and race "mixing" in a period when empires were beginning to be in question).

=== 1922–1945 ===
The lead article in the first issue of Foreign Affairs was written by the former secretary of state under Theodore Roosevelt's administration, Elihu Root. The article argued that the United States had become a world power, and that as such the general population needed to be better informed about international matters. John Foster Dulles, then a financial expert attached to the American Commission to Negotiate Peace, who would later become secretary of state under Dwight D. Eisenhower, also contributed an article to the inaugural issue of Foreign Affairs on Allied debt following World War I.

In 1925, Foreign Affairs published a series of articles, entitled "Worlds of Color", by prominent African American intellectual W. E. B. Du Bois. DuBois, a personal friend of Armstrong, wrote mainly about race issues and imperialism. Although in the early days of publication the journal did not have many female authors, in the late 1930s American journalist for Time magazine Dorothy Thompson would contribute articles.

=== 1945–1991 ===
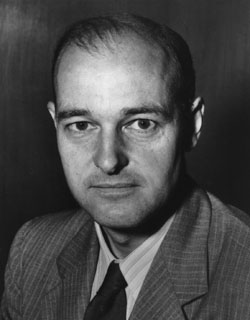
George F. Kennan published his doctrine of containment in the July 1947 issue of Foreign Affairs.

The journal rose to its greatest prominence after World War II when foreign relations became central to United States politics, and the United States became a powerful actor on the global scene. Several extremely important articles were published in Foreign Affairs, including the reworking of George F. Kennan's "Long Telegram", which first publicized the doctrine of containment that would form the basis of American Cold War policy.

Louis Halle, a member of the U.S. Policy Planning Staff, also wrote an influential article in Foreign Affairs in 1950. His article, "On a Certain Impatience with Latin America", created the anticommunist intellectual framework that justified U.S. policy towards Latin America in the Cold War era. Halle's article described that the encouragement of democracy in postwar Latin America had ended. He demonstrated disgust over Latin America's inability to assume autonomy and to become democratic. His rationalization towards Latin America was later used to justify U.S. efforts to overthrow the left-leaning Guatemalan government.

Eleven U.S. secretaries of state have written essays in Foreign Affairs.

=== 1991–present ===
Since the end of the Cold War, and especially after the 9/11 attacks, the journal's readership has grown significantly. As of April 2021, Foreign Affairs's total readership is 303,000 for the print magazine and it has 1.2 million unique visitors per month for the website.

In the Summer 1993 issue, Foreign Affairs published Samuel P. Huntington's influential "Clash of Civilizations?" article. In the article, Huntington argued that "the fundamental source of conflict in this new world will not be primarily ideological or primarily economic. The great divisions among humankind and the dominating source of conflict will be cultural."

In the November/December 2003 issue of Foreign Affairs, Kenneth Maxwell wrote a review of Peter Kornbluh's book The Pinochet File: A Declassified Dossier on Atrocity and Accountability, which gave rise to a controversy about Henry Kissinger's relationship to the regime of Chilean dictator Augusto Pinochet and to Operation Condor. Maxwell claims that key Council on Foreign Relations members, acting at Kissinger's behest, put pressure on Foreign Affairs editor James Hoge to give the last word in a subsequent exchange about the review to William D. Rogers, a close associate of Kissinger, rather than to Maxwell; this went against established Foreign Affairs policy.

The article "Who Is Khamenei?" by Akbar Ganji, which was published in the magazine's September/October 2013 issue, emphasized the view that the Supreme Leader is the primary decision maker in Iran.

Then-opposition leader and former Ukrainian Prime Minister Yulia Tymoshenko caused a stir by publishing an article entitled "Containing Russia" in the May–June 2007 issue of Foreign Affairs accusing Russia under Vladimir Putin of expansionism and urging the rest of Europe to stand against him. Russian foreign minister Sergei Lavrov wrote an article in response, but he withdrew it, citing "censorship" from the Foreign Affairs editorial board. Tymoshenko's party went on to win the 2007 elections and she became Prime Minister once again.

In 2009, Foreign Affairs launched its new website, ForeignAffairs.com, which offers both print content and online-only features.

Beginning with the January/February 2013 issue, Foreign Affairs was redesigned including that the cover would have an image. Per Politico's story on the redesign: "As part of an effort to expand its appeal beyond the foreign policy establishment, every issue of Foreign Affairs will now feature a photograph on the cover and an extensive interview with a leading newsmaker."

== Book reviews ==
Since its inception, Foreign Affairs has included a long book review section, typically reviewing 50 or more books per issue. The magazine's first editor, Archibald Cary Coolidge, asked his Harvard colleague, William L. Langer, a historian and World War I veteran, to run the section. Langer initially had full control over the magazine's book reviews and wrote all the reviews himself. A month before the reviews were due, the Foreign Affairs office in New York would ship approximately one hundred books to Langer for review and within two weeks he would return his completed reviews for the next issue.

Beginning with the first issue in 1922, Harry Elmer Barnes authored a reoccurring section titled “Some Recent Books on International Relations”. By 1924, the Foreign Affairs website lists Barnes as Bibliographical Editor.

In the late 1930s, the review section was broken down into several categories. Currently, the Foreign Affairs reviews are broken down into long review essays, which are placed at the front of the books section, and the "Recent Books" section, where shorter reviews are featured. The "Recent Books" section is further broken down into the following subject categories.

- Political and Legal, reviewed by G. John Ikenberry
- Economic, Social, and Environmental, reviewed by Barry Eichengreen
- Military, Scientific, and Technological, reviewed by Lawrence D. Freedman
- The United States, reviewed by Jessica T. Mathews
- Western Europe, reviewed by Andrew Moravcsik
- Western Hemisphere, reviewed by Richard Feinberg
- Eastern Europe and Former Soviet Republics, reviewed by Maria Lipman
- Middle East, reviewed by Lisa Anderson
- Asia and Pacific, reviewed by Andrew J. Nathan
- Africa, reviewed by Nicolas van de Walle

The majority of the book reviews featured in the "Recent Books" section are reviewed by the same person; however, other reviewers contribute to the "Recent Books" section on occasion.

== Influence ==
Foreign Affairs is considered an important forum for debate among academics and policy makers. In 1996, Deputy Secretary of State Strobe Talbott noted: "Virtually everyone I know in the foreign policy-national security area of the Government is attentive to Foreign Affairs."

According to the Journal Citation Reports, the journal has a 2023 impact factor of 6.3, ranking it 2nd out of 166 journals in the category "International Relations".

== Editors ==
- Daniel Kurtz-Phelan: 2021–present
- Gideon Rose: 2010–2021
- James F. Hoge, Jr.: 1992–2010
- William G. Hyland: 1984–1992
- William P. Bundy: 1972–1984
- Hamilton Fish Armstrong: 1928–1972
- Archibald Cary Coolidge: 1922–1928
