= Douglas J. Skinner =

American academic

Douglas J. Skinner is an accounting professor, and the Deputy Dean for Faculty and Eric J. Gleacher Distinguished Service Professor of Accounting at the University of Chicago Booth School of Business. His substantive interests are in corporate accounting and specifically in disclosure practices of corporations and the role of disclosure in shareholder litigation, corporate financial reporting, and corporate finance.

He is originally from Australia. He earned his undergraduate degree in economics from Macquarie University and a PhD in Applied Economics from the University of Rochester. Starting in 1989, Skinner was a professor at the Ross School of Business at the University of Michigan until 2005 when he joined the University of Chicago Booth School of Business.

He has been involved in research on corporate accounting and corporate finance. His research led to changes by the Security and Exchange Commission addressing unfair timing advantages in high-speed algorithmic trading.

== Selected publications ==
- Rogers, Jonathan L.; Skinner, Douglas J.; Zechman, Sarah L. C. (1 January 2017). "Run EDGAR Run: SEC Dissemination in a High-Frequency World". Journal of Accounting Research. 55 (2): 459–505. doi:10.1111/1475-679X.12167.
- Dechow, Patricia; Skinner, Douglas J. (1 February 2000). "Earnings Management: Reconciling the Views of Accounting Academics, Practitioners, and Regulators". ]
- Skinner, Douglas J. (1994). "Why Firms Voluntarily Disclose Bad News". Journal of Accounting Research. 32 (1): 38–60. doi:10.2307/2491386. hdl:2027.42/36117. JSTOR 2491386.
