= W. Byford Jones =

English writer

Wilfred Byford Jones (1905–1977) was an English writer and British Army officer (Lieutenant Colonel). He wrote extensively about the Middle East, as well as the history of oil production. In 1958, he published Forbidden Frontiers, which examined the political tensions and borders of the Middle East. He was Deputy Editor and News Editor of the Wolverhampton Express and Star.

Married Cynthia Louise Johnson (1924–2006), Caxton Hall, Westminster, 20th February 1947.

== Selected publications ==
- Death By Order
- Uncensored Eyewitness, 1961
- Oil On Troubled Waters, 1958
- Adventures With Two Passports
- The Greek Trilogy. Resistance-liberation-revolution, 1945
- Four Faces of Peru, 1967
- The Lightning War, 1967
