= Sarah Wright (disambiguation) =

Sarah Wright (born 1983) is an American actress.

Sarah Wright may also refer to:

- Jessie Sarah Wright (1863-1892), New Zealand artist
- Sarah Wright (footballer) (born 1994), Australian rules footballer
- Sarah E. Wright (1928–2009), American writer
- Sarah Rowell Wright (1862–1930), Canadian reformer, suffragist; newspaper editor

== See also ==
- Sara Wright (born 1969), Bermudian sailor
