= Sarah Zar =

American songwriter

Sarah Zar (born Sarah Gonek) is an American visual artist, songwriter, performance artist, curator, and musical saw player. She has been active in publishing writing, showing art, and performing music in New York and beyond since 1998. She is the granddaughter of Rose Zar and is based in Brooklyn, New York.

In 2022, Zar exhibited her artwork at the Guilford Art Center in a show titled, "Bigger on the Inside: A Gestalt in One Room". That year, she designed the cover of the novel Water Under the Bridge: A Sort-of Love Story by author Jen Payne.

== Art ==
Zar's work has been showcased in various venues including Sloan Fine Art, Denise Bibro Fine Art, Janet Kurnatowski Gallery, Sideshow Gallery, under bridges, on boats, and The Highline Ballroom. Her paintings have received numerous awards in NY, and her other visual works range from installations, drawings, collages, and sculptures to spatial design and letters to strangers. She also teaches Contemporary Art and Aesthetics at Montclair State University.

Sarah Zar's work is akin to that of a migratory bird, traditional yet nomadic in creating novels through painting, characterized by its colorful use of dream logic.

== Writing ==
Sarah Zar's writing debuted in 1998 in the Hazmat Literary Review by Norm Davis and has since been published in various formats, including:

- Riddled With Spots by Sarah Zar and Charles Whymper, 1st ed., New York: A. Keck, NY.
- ONandOnScreen
- Featured Visitor at The Kelly Writers House, where she discussed "The language of technology in contemporary post-modern fiction for 'After David Foster Wallace'".

== Awards ==
- Graduate Citation – Montclair State University
- First Place in the Fence Select Exhibition, Arts Center of Troy – Troy, NY
- The Roanne Kulakoff Award for Painting – Albany, NY
- Art Departmental Award for Drawing and Painting – S.U.N.Y. Albany
- Presidential Scholarship and University Honors Scholarship – S.U.N.Y. Albany
- Bradley Smith Art Purchase Award for Sculpture – Rochester, NY
- Grant for a 2-year Caste Drawing Apprenticeship with Lori Harpole – Rochester, NY

== Publications ==
- Zar, S, Whymper, A. Keck Press (2017). "Riddled with Spots".
- Schweda, Brendan, Zar, Sarah (Illustrator), etc. (2017). "The Order of the Days".
- Zar, S, Sphinx Business Papers (2022)."Junk Journal Magazine - Woodland".
- House Elves Anonymous, Zar, S, Sphinx Business Papers (2022). "Our Family Tree Index: A 12 Generation Genealogy Notebook for 4,095 ancestors".
