= James F. Hoge Jr. =

American magazine editor (1935–2023)

James Fulton Hoge Jr. (December 25, 1935 – September 19, 2023) was an American journalist and magazine publisher who was the editor of Foreign Affairs and the Peter G. Peterson Chair at the Council on Foreign Relations. His principal areas of expertise were U.S. foreign policy and international economic policy.

== Career ==
After graduating from Yale University with a B.A. in political science in 1958, Hoge began his journalistic career with the Chicago Sun-Times; during this period, he received an M.A. in history from the University of Chicago in 1961 and served as a Congressional Fellow of the American Political Science Association (1962–1963). After serving as Washington, D.C. correspondent (1963–1965), city editor (1965–1967), and managing editor (1967–1968) of the Sun-Times, he was promoted to editor-in-chief in 1968. From 1976 to 1976, he concurrently served as editor in chief of the Sun-Times's sister publication, the Chicago Daily News. In 1980, he attended the six-week Harvard Business School Advanced Management Program, and relinquished his editorial duties, continuing as the newspaper's publisher. He left the Sun-Times in 1984 and was appointed president and publisher of the New York Daily News, where he remained until 1991. The Sun-Times won six Pulitzer Prizes during his tenure there, and the Daily News won one during his presidency.

Following fellowships at the Harvard Institute of Politics (1991) and the Freedom Forum Media Studies Center at the Columbia University Graduate School of Journalism (1992), he was appointed editor of Foreign Affairs in 1992, replacing William G. Hyland. During his tenure, the magazine doubled its circulation and launched Spanish, Japanese, and Russian editions. He was succeeded by Gideon Rose in 2010. Under his editorship Foreign Affairs became a rare instance of an academic journal that turned a profit, earning several hundred thousand dollars, per year. He was later a senior advisor in Teneo's intelligence division.

Hoge previously served as the chair of the Pulitzer Prize Board, Human Rights Watch and the Foundation for a Civil Society, and was the vice chair of the International Center for Journalists.

== Personal life ==
Hoge was born on December 25, 1935, in New York City. Hoge was the second of four siblings, and the son of James F. Hoge Sr. (1901–72) and Virginia McClamroch Hoge. His brother was Warren Hoge, who was a United Nations bureau chief for The New York Times. Both brothers attended Phillips Exeter Academy in Exeter, New Hampshire.

Hoge married Alice Albright and had three children, Alicia Hoge, James Patrick Hoge, and Robert Warren Hoge. They divorced in 1971. He had a son with journalist and lawyer Cynthia McFadden, Spencer Graham McFadden Hoge, who was born in 1998 and named after the actor Spencer Tracy.

James F. Hoge Jr. died at Weill Cornell Medical Center on September 19, 2023, at the age of 87, just under a month after his brother.

== Published works ==
Hoge edited and contributed to a large number of books published by Foreign Affairs, the Council on Foreign Relations, and other publishers. Some of the more notable of these are:

- Understanding the War on Terror, Gideon Rose and James F. Hoge Jr. (editors), (Foreign Affairs, 2005) ISBN 0-87609-347-0
- How Did This Happen? Terrorism and the New War, Gideon Rose and James F. Hoge Jr. (editors), (Public Affairs, 2001) ISBN 1-58648-130-4
- The Clash of Civilizations? The Debate, Gideon Rose and James F. Hoge Jr. (editors), (Foreign Affairs, 1996) ISBN 0-87609-164-8

Hoge published numerous articles in journals such as The New Republic, Nieman Reports, Media Studies Journal, and Foreign Affairs, and in many newspapers including The Washington Post and The New York Sun.

== See also ==
- Foreign Affairs
- Council on Foreign Relations
- Gideon Rose
- James Hoge Tyler - Hoge's first cousin twice-removed, who wrote a genealogy of the family, The Family of Hoge, published in 1927.
