= Sarah Hoge =

German politician (born 1987)

Member of the Landtag of Mecklenburg-Vorpommern
- Assuming office 20 October 2026
- Succeeding: Andreas Butzki
- Constituency: Mecklenburgische Seenplatte IV

Personal details
- Born: 1987 (age 38–39)
- Party: Alternative for Germany (since 2019)

Sarah Hoge (born 1987) is a German politician who was elected member of the Landtag of Mecklenburg-Vorpommern in 2026. She is the group leader of the Alternative for Germany in the city council of Malchow.
