= Sarah Hart =

Sarah or Sara Hart may refer to:

- Sara Hart (writer) (pseudonym of Maureen Child; born 1951), American romance novelist
- Sarah Hart, murder victim of 19th-century criminal John Tawell
- Sarah B. Hart, British mathematician
- Sarah Hart, one of the American perpetrators of the Hart family murders
- Sarah Hart, character from the 1982 science-fiction thriller film Anna to the Infinite Power
- Sarah Hart, character from the 2010 young adult science fiction novel I Am Number Four
- Sarah Hart (musician), American musician and songwriter
- Sarah Hart (artist) (1880–1981), Canadian artist and educator
