= Sára Karig =

Hungarian writer and poet (1914–1999)

- Karig Sára
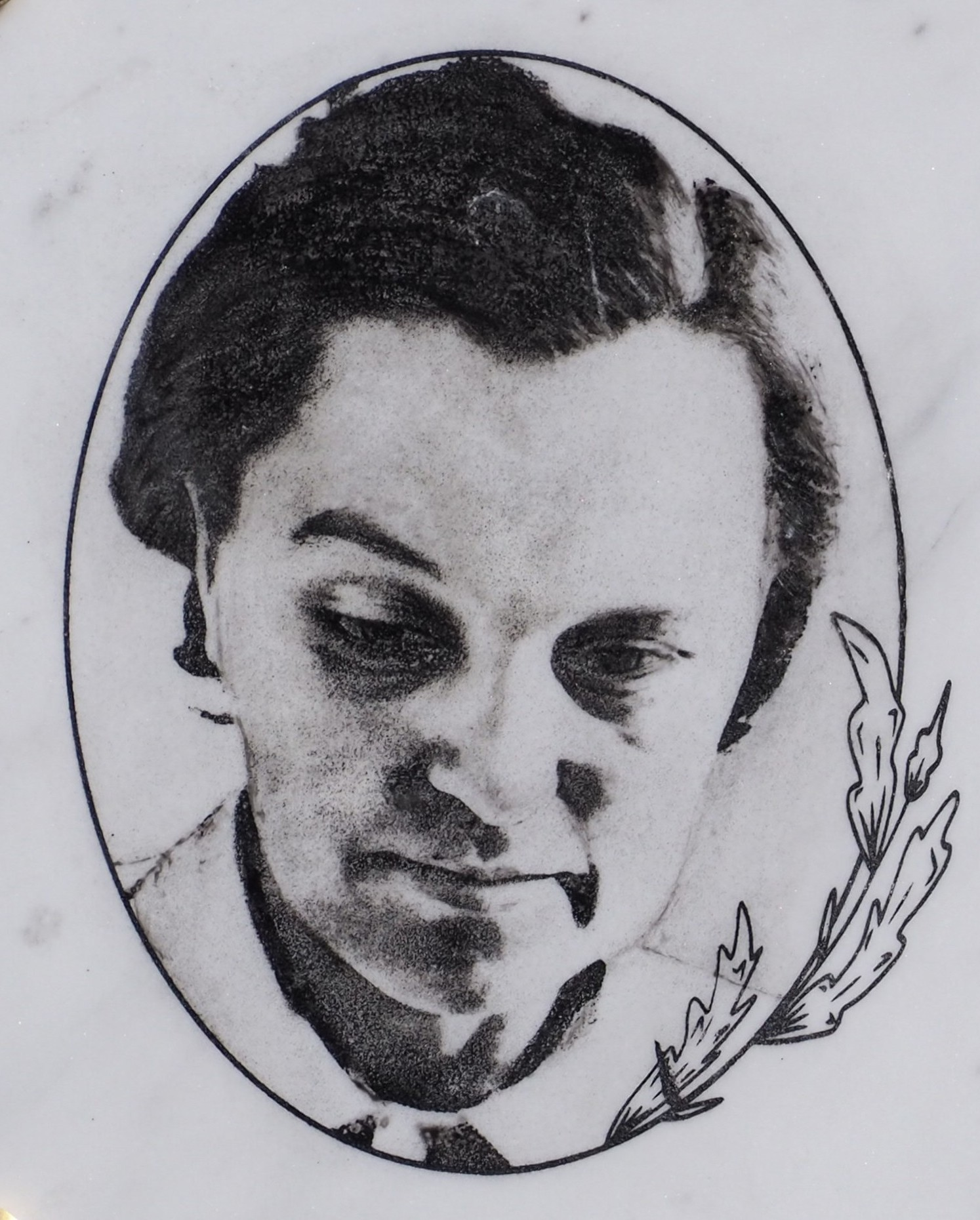
- Commemorative plaque dedicated to Sára in Újpest, Budapest, Hungary
- Born: 13 June 1914; Baja, Hungary
- Died: 2 February 1999 (aged 84); Budapest, Hungary
- Parent: Emil Karig
- Honours: Righteous Among the Nations

Karig Sára (13 June 1914 – 2 February 1999) was a Hungarian poet best known for her humanitarian efforts during the Second World War. She was recognized as Righteous Among the Nations in 1985.

== Life ==
=== Early life ===
Karig Sára was born into a family of teachers in Baja, Hungary as the youngest of three children. Karig went to various schools as a child and learned Latin, English, German, and French. Following disputes with teachers, she was expelled from her local school. From third grade on, she wrote short stories and poems for a local newspaper, and in high school, she was the president of the school's literary study circle. After high school in Szeged, Karig planned to become an English teacher and enrolled as a student at Franz Joseph University. During her two years there, she became friends with Albert Szent-Györgyi's daughter and stayed at the family's home for a time.

With the help of the Szent-Györgyi family, she became an au pair in Newcastle, England, attending lectures at Durham University while obtaining a certificate as a language teacher from the University of London. She attended the Fabian Society meetings in her free time. After returning from London in 1937, she worked at an ironworking plant in Budapest, managing English and German correspondence. She worked at K&H Bank and a trade corporation in the following years. In 1943, she joined Social Democratic Party of Hungary inspired by her supervisor at the ironworking plant, Pál Justus.

=== Post-invasion of Hungary ===
After March 1944, she helped hundreds of persecuted individuals find apartments and get documents or counseling. While she was officially working for the Swedish Red Cross, in reality, she was working under Raoul Wallenberg. She put Jewish children in safe homes and orphanages. She hid Polish refugees and British soldiers in ten different apartments rented under her name. Karig got married eight times to allow her "husbands" to pass as Christians. She also helped distribute weapons and ammunition to paramilitary groups across Hungary. Karig, along with other friends, would house escaping Allied POWs, and find them safe routes home. She ran a printing shop that produced anti-war propaganda and fake documents for Jews and refugees. After the war, Karig was decorated by General Alexander for her help to British soldiers and was offered citizenship in the UK, which she declined.

In late 1945, she studied law at Pázmány Péter Catholic University for two semesters and became a certified accountant. Karig also took up an administrative post in the Social Democratic Party and served as a secretary with the British Council.

Before the 1947 Hungarian parliamentary election, she had in 1945. She had suspicions about voter fraud arising from the Hungarian Communist Party taking additional unused voting slips and refusing to hand them over to the local secretary. These suspicions led to the arrests of numerous voters. Because of this, in September 1947, she was abducted and handed over to the Soviet authorities. Karig spent three months in the Soviet occupation zone in Austria, interned at Baden bei Wien and subject to numerous interrogations.

Karig was accused of spying and moved to Neunkirchen am Potzberg, where she was kept until her move to the Soviet Union. In December 1947, she was moved to the Vorkuta gulag, where she spent two and a half years working in a clay mine, loading wagons and moving them to the brickyard. She fell ill during her time there, having a severe ear infection and needing an emergency mastoidectomy performed. Karig spent a few months recovering in a hospital and then was transferred to Sverdlovsk, Ukraine. During her imprisonment, she read Russian novels and learned Ukrainian and Russian. When Stalin died, she was moved to Lviv before being released in 1953 and placed on a train heading for Budapest.

=== Later life ===
After her return, she worked as editor-in-chief for the publishing house Europa Publishers. She translated various novels into Hungarian and was an active member of different literary and scientific societies. In 1957, she was rehabilitated by Soviet authorities. Karig was given the Righteous Among the Nations award in 1985 by Yad Vashem. She never married and died at her home in February 1999.
