= Sarah Young (author) =

Christian author

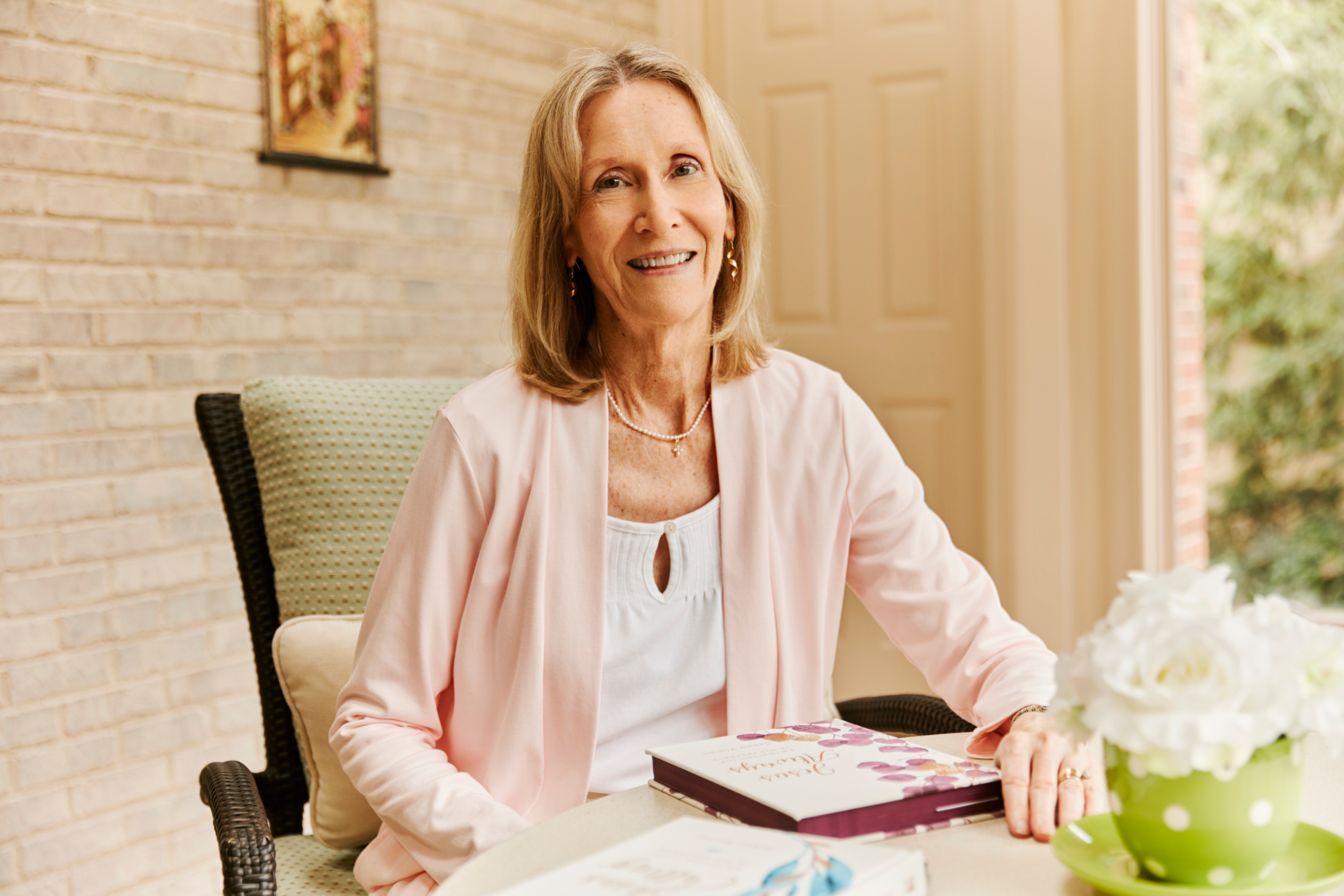
- Born: March 15, 1946; Nashville, Tennessee, United States
- Died: August 31, 2023 (aged 77); Brentwood, Tennessee, United States
- Occupations: Christian author, missionary, counselor

Sarah Young (March 15, 1946 – August 31, 2023) was an American Christian missionary, counselor, and author known for her contributions to Christian literature, in particular for her book Jesus Calling. Young was an advocate of contemplative prayer. Her books have sold over 45 million units worldwide. She has been described as one of the most successful Christian authors in history.

== Life ==
Sarah Jane Kelly was born on March 15, 1946, in Nashville, Tennessee, to parents Douglass (Levine) Kelly and Tom Kelly, both educators. She graduated from E. C. Glass High School in Lynchburg, Virginia. Young pursued her higher education at Wellesley College, earning a degree in philosophy in 1968, and later obtained a master's degree in child development from Tufts University in 1974.

While in graduate school, Young, a lapsed Christian, encountered the work of evangelical theologian Francis Schaeffer. She later reported that Schaeffer's work profoundly impacted her spiritual journey. She visited L'Abri, an evangelical center in Switzerland, where she had a spiritual encounter and converted to Christianity. She decided to become a Christian counselor and enrolled at Covenant Theological Seminary in Creve Coeur, Missouri, where she met her husband, Stephen Young, a third-generation missionary. They married in 1977 and served as Presbyterian missionaries near Yokkaichi, Japan, for eight years. While in Japan, Young gave birth to her two children.

After living in Japan, the family moved to Atlanta, Georgia, where Young earned a master's degree in counseling from Georgia State University.

In 1991, the couple moved to Melbourne, Australia. There, Young started a Christian counseling practice for women who had been sexually or spiritually abused. While meditating on God’s protection, visualizing those she cared for encircled by the Holy Spirit, Young had an experience where she was enveloped by light and overcome by peace.

In 2001, they moved to Perth. In the following years, Young's chronic health conditions, including Lyme disease, melanoma, and vertigo, often left her housebound.

In 2013, the couple moved to Nashville, Tennessee. Young died on August 31, 2023, from leukemia, at her home in Brentwood, Tennessee, aged 77.

== Writing career ==
Young began maintaining a devotional journal in 1992. She practiced "listening prayers," writing down what she thought God was saying to her, rather than what she wanted to say to God. This journal eventually formed the basis of her most famous work, Jesus Calling. Young prepared a manuscript but was initially rejected by publishers and gave up on publishing in 2001. However, her writings eventually caught the attention of an executive at Integrity (later part of Thomas Nelson), who offered her a contract.

Jesus Calling, published in 2004, started modestly but surged in popularity following a renewed marketing effort by Thomas Nelson. The devotional book, composed of daily spiritual readings purportedly written in the voice of Jesus Christ, became a bestseller in the Christian literary world.

The success of Jesus Calling led to the release of sequels, including Jesus Always and Jesus Today, along with various related products such as calendars, journals, and children's editions. Additionally, the Jesus Calling brand expanded into podcasts, an app, a magazine, and a television show, collectively selling over 45 million units as of August 2023.

Jesus Calling also faced criticism from some who accused Young of blasphemy for writing in the voice of Jesus. Various critics, including authors Kathy Keller and Randy Alcorn as well as Reformed Baptist pastor and theologian Tim Challies have referred to Young's writings as dangerous and misleading while accusing her of infusing occultic and pagan practices in her devotionals. Much of the negative criticism and accusations came following her death.

== Personal life ==
Young was known as an intensely private individual who preferred to avoid public appearances and gave interviews only by email. She remained dedicated to her faith, her family, and her writing throughout her life.

In 2009, Young traveled to the United States for six months to receive treatment for Lyme disease but saw little improvement.

Young was survived by her husband, Stephen Young, their two children Stephanie van der Westhuizen and Eric Young, her three siblings, and six grandchildren.
