= Sarah Byford =

British economist

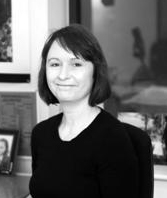

Academic background
- Education: Brunel University London, University of York, King's College London

Academic work
- Discipline: Health Economics

Sarah Byford is a British economist. She is the André professor of health economics and director of King's Health Economics (KHE) at the Institute of Psychiatry, Psychology and Neuroscience. She specialises in the economic evaluation of mental health services and clinical and economic evaluation of complex interventions, including services for children and adolescents.

She is a senior economics advisor at the Social Care Institute for Excellence, a member of the National Institute for Health and Care Excellence Public Health Interventions Advisory Committee (PHIAC), Associate Editor of the British Journal of Psychiatry and a Mental Health Review Journal editorial board member.

== Academic career ==
Byford began her academic career by completing a BSc (Hons) in economics at Brunel University. She continued her education by attaining an MSc, first in health economics (1993) and then health sciences (2004) at the University of York. Byford was awarded her PhD in health economics at King's College, London in 2009.

== Editorial roles ==
Byford holds key editorial roles at a number of journals:

- 2013–present Social Psychiatry and Psychiatric Epidemiology editorial board
- 2011–present Royal College of Psychiatrists Publication Management Board
- 2007–present British Journal of Psychiatry associate editor
- 2007–present Mental Health Review Journal editorial board member

== Bibliography ==
- Byford, Sarah; Sefton, Tom; McDaid, David (2003), Because it's worth it : a practical guide to conducting economic evaluations in the social welfare field, Contemporary research issues, Joseph Rowntree Foundation, ISBN 9781859351116
- Byford, Sarah; Sefton, Tom; LSE Health and Social Care (2002), First aid : lessons in health economics for economic evaluation in social welfare, LSE Health and Social Care discussion paper series, LSE Health and Social Care, ISBN 9780753015711
- Byford, Sarah; University of London. Institute of Psychiatry, The design of clinical and economic evaluations of child and adolescent mental health services in the UK : policy and practice, OCLC 681171171
- Byford, Sarah; Geddes, Joanna M L; Bonsalll, Margaret; University of York. Centre for Health Economics (1995), Stroke rehabilitation : a cost-effectiveness analysis of a placement scheme, Discussion paper series (University of York. Centre for Health Economics), 140, Centre for Health Economics, OCLC 34510399
