= Sarah Young (DJ) =

British DJ and record producer

- Born: 10 May 1989 (age 37); London, United Kingdom
- Occupations: Disc jockey, Record Producer
- Instrument: Turntable

Sarah Young (born 10 May 1989) is a British DJ and record producer.

== Biography ==
=== Early life ===
Sarah's music taste came from her mixed heritage and musical entourage where she grew up listening to Indian and Arab music, influenced by her mother, who played piano, violin and flute. Although quoted to have not enjoyed school, Young attended the Academy of Contemporary Music from 12 years old and played the drums from an early age.

=== Education ===
Attending University of the Arts London, Young was a student by day and DJ by night, mixing house music, kuduro and international bass music. Not long after she graduated, she made the decision to become a full-time record producer.

=== Musical career ===
Whilst holding down a weekly show on the radio, Sarah discovered Moombahton and premiered the ‘Moombahton Mash up’ feature consisting of tracks and remixes in a 10-minute mash up mix. Following a year of consistently promoting the genre, Young released a UK nationwide moombahton mix CD for WeSC.

Afterwards, Young released underground dance music and her first extended play "I am Sarah Young" (2012). This free CD release consisted of three tracks influenced by genres such as kuduro, moombahton, bhangra, soca, and house music. Among the tracks was "Ajambo Si's" music video which was spotted by MTV world networks. Later, she released her second free independent underground dance extended play "The Chant", premiered officially on MTV IGGY. She has since toured in Morocco and played festivals in Europe where she has been on the headline roster alongside Katy B & DJ Fresh. She has also debuted a guest show on Ministry of Sound Radio in addition to having several guest mixes on BBC Radio 1 Xtra and BBC Asian Network.

Currently, alongside summer residencies at venues such as Love & Liquor, Sarah is presenting online series called "The Beat" which explores the culture of the DJ/Producer
