= Morley Hall =

Morley Hall or Morleys Hall may refer to:

- Morley Hall, Morley, West Yorkshire, England, see Listed buildings in Morley, West Yorkshire
- Morley Town Hall, Morley, West Yorkshire, England
- Morley Old Hall, Norfolk, England
- Morleys Hall, Astley, Greater Manchester, England
