= Harriet McIlquham =

English suffragist

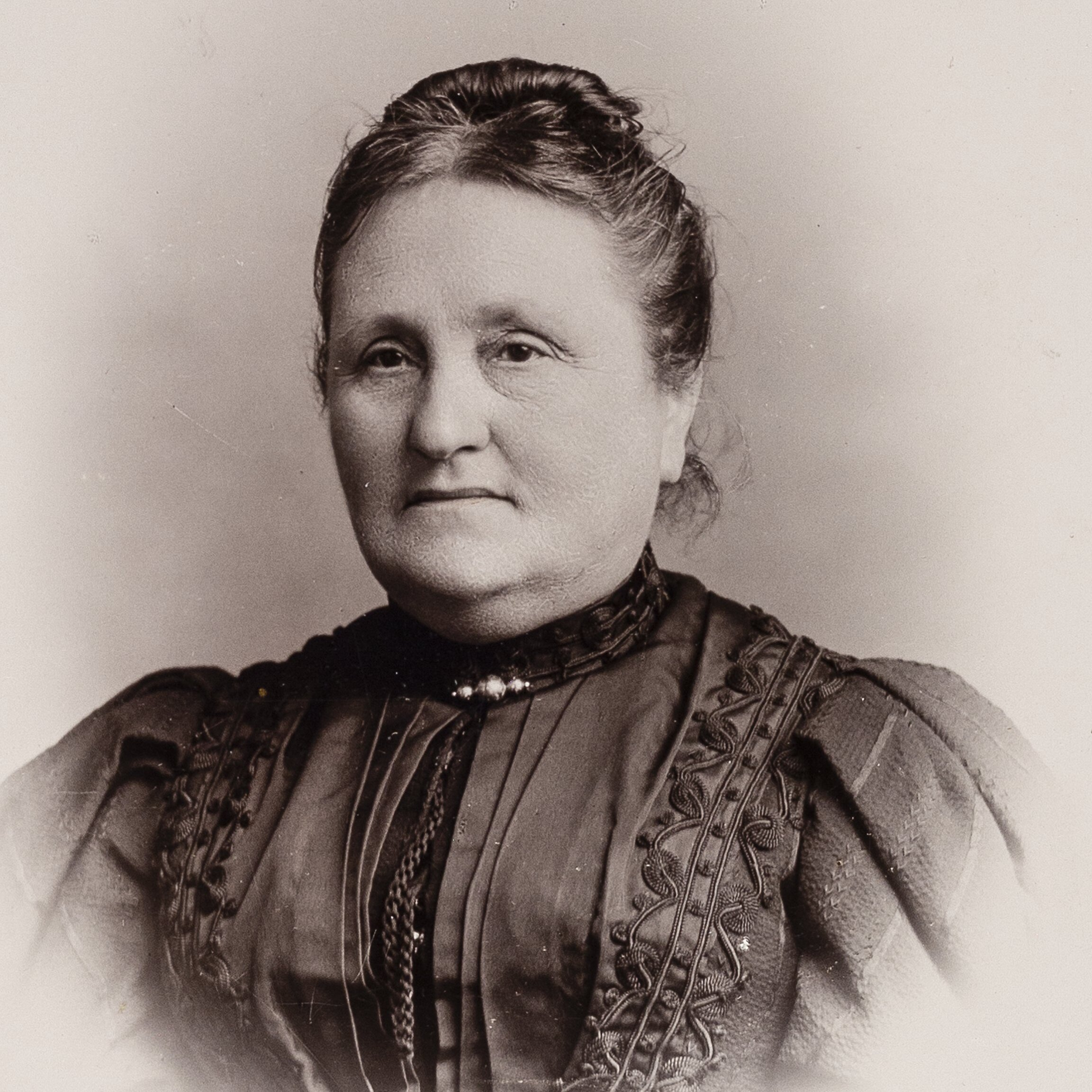
- Born: Harriett Medley; 8 August 1837; Brick Lane, London, England
- Died: 24 January 1910 (aged 72)
- Burial place: Tewkesbury Abbey, Gloucestershire, England
- Occupations: suffragist, poor law guardian and local councillor
- Organization(s): Manchester Society for Women's Suffrage; Women's Franchise League; Women's Emancipation Union; National Union of Women's Suffrage Societies
- Children: 4

Harriet McIlquham (née Medley; 8 August 1837 – 24 January 1910), also known as Harriett McIlquham, was an English suffragist, poor law guardian and local councillor.

== Early life ==
Harriet Medley was born on 8 August 1837 in Brick Lane, London, the daughter of Edward Medley (a baker) and Harriet Sanders Medley. She was from a wealthy Unitarian family which encouraged political discussion. In 1869, she purchased a large estate in Staverton.

== Political activism ==
=== Suffrage activism ===
McIlquham was a member of the Manchester Society for Women's Suffrage by 1877. She was also a member of the Bristol and West of England Society for Women's Suffrage and a founding member of Cheltenham's Suffrage Society. When the motion "should women, equally with men, be invested with the parliamentary franchise?" was discussed by the Cheltenham Debating Society on 7 December 1880, McIlquham participated in the debate. The motion was carried.

She co-organized the Birmingham Grand Demonstration with Maria Colby which was held on 22 February 1881, and spoke at the Bradford demonstration. In 1890, she was a delegate to a demonstration at St James' Hall in central London.

In 1889, McIlquham was a member of the Central National Society, and co-founded the Women's Franchise League (WFL) with Alice Cliff Scatcherd and Elizabeth Clarke Wolstenholme-Elmy, and was the league's first president. The WFL was the first organisation to include a commitment to married women's suffrage. McIlquham addressed the league at meetings on topics including women's suffrage, women's training and employment opportunities, and the 1884 Reform Act.

Due to a disagreement with Ursula Bright in the WFL, the organisation split in 1891. McIlquham co-founded the more radical Women's Emancipation Union (WEU) in 1892, and served on that organisation's council. She was also a member of the Cheltenham branch of the National Union of Women's Suffrage Societies (NUWSS), but also worked with and donated to the Women's Social and Political Union (WSPU). In 1905, she lobbied at the House of Commons alongside Sylvia Pankhurst of the WSPU.

McIllquham's closed friend Elmy initially refused to be paid for her work in the campaign for women's enfranchisement, but after her home was mortgaged in 1894 to fund her continued activism, McIlquham and other friends of Elmy organised a "Grateful Fund" to pay her £1 a week. McIlquham served as a trustee of this fund.

=== Local politics ===
McIlquham was elected a Poor Law guardian for the Boddington in the Tewkesbury Union in April 1881, the first married woman elected to that office in the country. She beat her male rival Henry Arkell by 48 votes. Her qualifications for the position were questioned, but because she also held property in her own name, the challenge failed. She carried this experience into her further activism, taking particular interest in married women's political rights. McIlquham served as a poor law guardian for thirteen years, and also sat a finance sub-committee of the Tewkesbury Board of Guardians.

McIlquham also became overseer of the poor for the parish of Staverton, the first chair of the Staverton parish council and vice-chairman of the Boddington School Board, among other local appointments. In 1889, McIlquham unsuccessfully stood as a Liberal candidate for the Cheltenham division of Gloucestershire County Council and gained 3% of the vote. She encouraged other women to stand as candidates in local elections.

== Writing ==
In January 1883, McIlquham wrote to the press criticising the staff of the local asylum, following a visiting committee report and information given by an escaped inmate.

McIlquham published pamphlets based on her lectures, among them "The Enfranchisement of Women: An Ancient Right, A Modern Need" in 1892. She also wrote a series of essays on the history of feminism for the Westminster Review.

== Personal life ==
Harriet Medley married James Henry McIlquham in 1858. They had four children and lived in Gloucestershire.

She died in 1910, aged 72 years, from heart failure, influenza and bronchitis. Her death came just hours after her paper on poet Robert Williams Buchanan was read at the Cheltenham Ethical Society. She was described in obituaries as a "tireless worker for the rights of her sex."

The papers of Harriet McIlquham are archived in The Women's Library at the London School of Economics.
