= Alice Cliff Scatcherd =

British suffragist

- Born: 7 November 1842; Wortley, Leeds, England
- Died: 24 December 1906 (aged 64)
- Organization(s): Leeds Ladies’ Educational Association; Women's Franchise League; Morley & District Nursing Association

Alice Cliff Scatcherd (7 November 1842 – 24 December 1906) was an early British suffragist who in 1889 founded the Women's Franchise League with Harriet McIlquham, Ursula Bright, Emmeline Pankhurst, Richard Pankhurst and Elizabeth Clarke Wolstenholme Elmy. She was a lifelong campaigner for women's rights in the Leeds area.

== Early life and education ==
Alice Cliff was born in Wortley, England, the seventh of fourteen children of the wealthy industrialist Joseph Cliff and his wife Alice Dewhirst. She grew up at Western Flatts House, now Cliff House, and although the family were Unitarians, she attended The Mount School in York, a Quaker school.

== Suffragist career ==
Scatcherd joined the Leeds Ladies’ Educational Association in 1872 and then the newly formed Leeds branch of the National Society for Women's Suffrage (NSWS), where she became a committee member. She was a frequent speaker at events in the 1870s, for example, on 24 March 1877, when she appeared in Macclesfield alongside Lydia Becker and other early suffragists discussing women's access to the vote. Scatcherd was supported by Henry Birchenough in seconding the first resolution which was moved by Joshua Oldfield Nicholson.

In 1889 Scatcherd founded the Women's Franchise League with Harriet McIlquham, Ursula Bright, Emmeline Pankhurst, Richard Pankhurst and Elizabeth Clarke Wolstenholme Elmy. She spoke at the inaugural meeting of the League. Scatcherd sought to widen the scope of the suffrage movement to include reforms to divorce, child custody, and other legal matters affecting women. With her husband, she founded the Morley & District Nursing Association, and she taught adult education classes for women.

The Alice Cliff Scatcherd scrapbook comprises letters, photographs, and letterpress relating to the national suffrage campaign, politics, education, and Morley civic life, and is held at Leeds Central Library.

A blue plaque to commemorate Scatcherd was unveiled on 2 August 2022 at her former home, Park House, Queen Street, Morley (now a funeral director's). It carries the words "This champion of women's education, trade unionism, and suffrage, who established the Morley District Nurses Association, lived here. She was a founder member of the Women's Franchise League, established in 1889. As a philanthropist, she donated Scatcherd Park to the people of Morley. 1842 - 1906".

== Personal life and death ==
On 3 October 1871, Alice Cliff married Oliver Scatcherd, a solicitor who was the youngest son of the antiquarian Norrison Cavendish Scatcherd. Her marriage vows did not include the promise to obey her husband, and she later refused to attend weddings in established churches where women took that vow. She also followed Quaker custom by not wearing a wedding ring, which reportedly shocked people when she travelled in Europe with her husband.

Scatcherd's husband served as Mayor of Morley in 1898–1900, and died in 1905. She died the following year at Morley Hall after a long illness, and is buried in the Scatcherd Mausoleum in the churchyard of St Mary's in the Wood in Morley.
