= Manchester Schoolmistresses Association =

The Manchester Schoolmistresses Association was inaugurated on 2 December 1865 as a local association for women teachers in Manchester. It was founded by Elizabeth Wolstenholme who became its honorary secretary and became a blueprint for similar organisations that sprung up in Leeds, Sheffield, Edinburgh and Newcastle upon Tyne. Anne Clough was an honorary member.

Emily Davies was invited to address a meeting of the Manchester Schoolmistresses Board in October 1866 where she spoke about an examination 'judged by the same standard as ordinary degree examinations of the University of Cambridge [that] would truly attest to women teachers' professional competence' and only a designated women's college would provide a studious environment.

In November 1866, Clough addressed the Manchester Schoolmistresses Board on the subject of a council drawn from members of the local Schoolmistresses' Associations to coordinate a lecture series. The North of England Council for Promoting the Higher Education of Women was established in November 1867.
