= John Chapman (publisher) =

19th-century English publisher

- Born: 16 June 1821; London, England
- Died: 25 November 1894 (aged 73)
- Occupation: Publisher

John Chapman (16 June 1821 – 25 November 1894) was an English publisher who acquired the influential radical journal, the Westminster Review. His assistant editor and lodger Mary Ann Evans later wrote classic novels under the name George Eliot.

== Life ==
Chapman was born on 16 June 1821. He was son of a chemist at Nottingham. He was apprenticed to a watchmaker at Worksop, but, not staying long with him, went to his brother, a medical student at Edinburgh, who sent him out to Adelaide to start in business as a watchmaker and optician. Returning to Europe about 1844, he began studying medicine in Paris, and continued his studies at St. George's Hospital, London. After submitting a book on human nature to Green, a publisher and bookseller in Newgate Street, he was led to take over Green's business, which he transferred to 142 Strand.

In 1846, he published the first English translation of David Strauss' Life of Jesus, translated by Mary Ann Evans, later better known by her pen name of George Eliot. Seven years later, he published her translation of Feuerbach's The Essence of Christianity.

He acquired the philosophical radical journal the Westminster Review in 1851, and provided a platform for emerging ideas of evolution. His assistant Mary Anne Evans brought together authors including Francis William Newman, W. R. Greg, Caroline Cornwallis, Harriet Martineau and the young journalist Herbert Spencer, and later John Stuart Mill, William Carpenter, Robert Chambers, George Holyoake and Thomas Huxley.

Herbert Spencer "despaired of getting his sociological writings published until Chapman took him on. (It was he, not Darwin, who coined the phrase "the survival of the fittest".) Thomas Huxley, later famous as the most ardent supporter of Darwinism, calling himself Darwin's bulldog and cheerfully going into battle with bishops over On the Origin of Species while Darwin lay low at his home in Kent, was plucked from poverty and obscurity by Chapman. His first paid employment was as scientific reviewer on the Westminster Review, the radical quarterly periodical that Chapman bought in 1851 and turned into the best journal of the century."

Chapman subsequently became a qualified specialist in sickness and psychological medicine, and in 1865 Charles Darwin invited Dr. Chapman to Downe and gave him a long list of the symptoms he had suffered from for 25 years. Chapman prescribed a spinal freezing treatment.

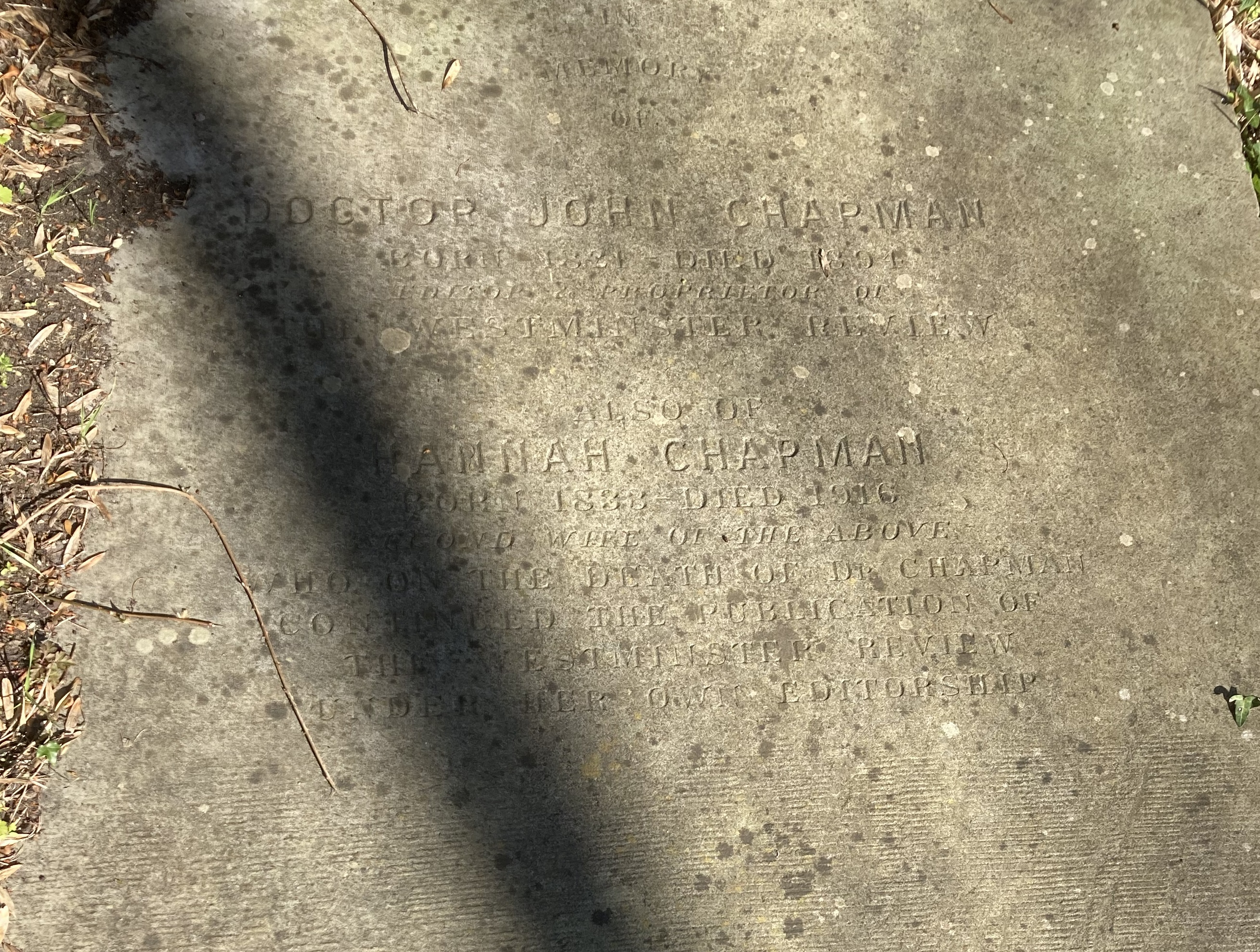
Family grave of John Chapman in Highgate Cemetery

In 19th-century Britain there was high-class patronage of Hydropathy. Charles Darwin was a user of it and his old friend Dr. James Manby Gully (1808-83) had a thriving hydropathic institution in Malvern. Similarly, he was connected to John Chapman, a homeopath in London and a friend of Thomas Huxley. According to Emma Darwin's diary, John Chapman visited Darwin on 20 May 1865. Chapman was proprietor and editor of the Westminster Review, to which Huxley had been a regular contributor." For his woes, Chapman had Darwin using bags of ice applied to the spine.

Chapman lived with both his wife and mistress, and Mary Ann Evans is believed to have had an affair with him, as well as having an earlier relationship with suffragette and women's rights activist Barbara Leigh Smith Bodichon (who refused to marry Chapman and lose her legal rights as a married woman).

Chapman died in Paris on 25 November 1894, as the result of being run over by a cab. His body was returned to England and buried on the eastern side of Highgate Cemetery and the inscription records that his wife took over the editorship of the Westminster Review.

== Works ==
- Diarrhœa and cholera: their nature, origin, and treatment through the agency of the nervous system, John Chapman, 1866
- The medical institutions of the United Kingdom: a history exemplifying the evils of over-legislation, John Chapman, 1870
- Neuralgia and kindred diseases of the nervous system: their nature, causes, and treatment: also, a series of cases, preceded by an analytical exposition of them, exemplifying the principles and practice of neuro-dynamic medicine, John Chapman, 1873
- Cholera curable: a demonstration of the causes, non-contagiousness, and successful treatment of the disease, John Chapman, 1885
- George Eliot & John Chapman: with Chapman's Diaries, Gordon S. Haight, 1940
