= Isabella Bream Pearce =

British socialist propagandist and suffrage campaigner

Isabelle Bream Pearce
- Born: 5 May 1859; Glasgow, Scotland
- Died: 11 December 1929 (aged 70); Glasgow, Scotland
- Known for: Suffragette and socialist propagandist
- Parents: John Thomson Duncan (father); Margaret Fraser (mother)

Isabella Bream Pearce (5 May 1859 – 11 December 1929) was a socialist propagandist and suffrage campaigner. She was the vice-president of the Glasgow Labour Party, president of the Glasgow Women's Labour Party, and a member of the Cathcart School Board.

== Early life ==
Isabella Bream Pearce was born 5 May 1859 in Glasgow, Scotland, the daughter of John Thomson Duncan, a bookkeeper, and Margaret Fraser. Pearce married Charles Bream Pearce, a wine importer for the American organisation the Brotherhood of the New Life.

== Campaigning for women's suffrage ==
Pearce was an active member of the Independent Labour Party during the 1890s and also served as vice-president of the Glasgow Labour Party and president of the Glasgow Women's Labour Party. Pearce and her husband, Charles Bream Pearce (1839–1905), were financial supporters of Keir Hardie's newspaper, Labour Leader. She wrote a column, 'Matrons and Maidens', for the newspaper between 1894 and 1898 under the pseudonym 'Lily Bell'.

Pearce and Isabella Ford both worked on behalf of the Women's Emancipation Union (WEU) in addition to their socialist labours. Ford spoke on the WEU's behalf at a series of rallies in the East End of London in 1895 while Pearce contributed important papers to WEU conferences. Not one of the WEU's authors and speakers "deprecated the effects of ‘awakening’ working‐class women to feminism, for as Isabella Bream Pearce asserted such women were no longer content to ‘sell [their] birthright … for a “mess of pottage”’, either in their labouring or their intimate lives."

The Glasgow branch of the Women's Social and Political Union (WSPU), the leading militant organisation campaigning for women's suffrage in the United Kingdom, from its inception had very strong links with the Independent Labour Party with early support provided by Pearce and from Tom Johnston of the ILP.

Teresa Billington-Greig was sent to organise the WSPU in Scotland in 1906 and it was through Pearce's friendship with Elizabeth Wolstenholme Elmy that Billington-Greig was introduced to Glasgow. Billington-Greig setup the WSPU's Scottish Council with Pearce as treasurer and married Frederick Lewis in Pearce's home in February 1907. When Billington-Greig resigned from the WSPU in June 1907 after falling out with then Pankhursts, Pearce and Grace Paterson took over as joint secretaries of the WSPU's Scottish Council.

== See also ==
- Women's Social and Political Union.
- Suffragette
- Women's suffrage in the United Kingdom
