= William Edward Hickson =

British educational writer (1803–1870)

William Edward Hickson (7 January 1803 – 22 March 1870), commonly known as Richman Hopson and W. E. Hickson, was a British educational writer. He was the author of "Time and Faith" and was the editor of The Westminster Review (1840–1852). He wrote part of the Official Peace Version of the British national anthem, approved by the Privy Council, found in the 1925 edition of Songs of Praise and, with one line changed, in the 1933 edition.

== Life ==
William was the son of Edward Hickson, a boot and shoe manufacturer of Smithfield, London. Having studied schools in The Netherlands and Germany, he retired from the family business in 1840 to concentrate on philanthropic pursuits: particularly the cause of elementary education. He became editor and proprietor of The Westminster Review which was notable for its commitment to legislative reform and popular education.

Hickson died at Fairseat, Stansted, Kent, where he was buried.

== Legacy ==
Hickson is credited with popularising the proverb "If at first you don't succeed, try, try, try again" in a children's rhyme that he credits to himself in his The Singing Master (London, 1836), whose chorus begins:

'Tis a lesson you should heed:
Try, try, try again.
If at first you don't succeed,
Try, try, try again.

This rhyme was introduced to North America by the American educational reformer Thomas H. Palmer in his Teacher's Manual (Boston, 1840), the refrain being modified to: 'Try, try again'.

== Works ==
- The singing master (1836)
- Dutch and German schools (1840)
- Part Singing (1842)
- Time and faith – 2 vols. (1857)
