= Women's Emancipation Union =

Women's rights organization, 1891–1899

The Women's Emancipation Union was founded by Elizabeth Clarke Wolstenholme Elmy in September 1891, following an infamous court case. Regina v Jackson, known colloquially as the Clitheroe Judgement, occurred when Edmund Jackson abducted his wife in a bid to enforce his conjugal rights, long before the concept of marital rape existed. The court of appeal freed Mrs Jackson under habeas corpus. Recognising the significance of this judgement in relation to coverture, the principle that a wife's legal personhood was subsumed in that of her husband, Wolstenholme left the Women's Franchise League to form this new women's campaigning group.

The group was funded by subscriptions and benefactor Mrs Russell Carpenter. It had a four point agenda:

- Equality of right and duty with men in all matters affecting the service of community and the state
- Equality of opportunity for self-development by the education of the schools and of life
- Equality in industry by equal freedom of choice of career
- Equality in marriage and in parental rights.

The WEU had an executive council, annual conference, ten local organisers in cities from Glasgow to Bristol and an international subscription list of over 7,000. The mixed sex members were an eclectic mix the main requirement of membership being that they were active in political life. Well known members included Charlotte Carmichael Stopes, Harriot Stanton Blatch, Florence Dixie, Mona Caird, George Holyoake and Amy Hurlston. A Parliamentary Sub Committee was formed in 1893.

The Women's Emancipation Union pioneered cross class collaborations, encouraged women's resistance to authority as long as their right to vote remained unacknowledged and advocated making Women's Suffrage a test question in the selection of potential parliamentary candidates.

Isabella Ford worked on behalf of the WEU at outdoor rallies in the East End of London in 1895. Working-class women were invited to give papers concerning their working life and conditions at the annual conferences.

Following the Local Government Act 1894, the WEU worked to get as many women to use their local government franchise and stand for election. Over 100 WEU organisers were elected as Poor Law Guardians or Parish Councillors.

Following the loss of Ferdinand Begg's 1897 Suffrage Bill, subscriptions halved and the death of the Union's benefactor caused the demise of this group. The final meeting was in 1899, and speakers included Harriot Stanton Blatch and Charlotte Perkins Gilman.

== Publications ==
The WEU published the first sex education manuals for adults to teach children and teenagers, The Human Flower and Baby Buds.

- Ellis Ethelmer Woman Free 1893
- William Henry Wilkins The Voice of the Voteless Toiler 1893
- Ellis Ethelmer The Human Flower 1894
- Ellis Ethelmer Baby Buds 1895
- Ellis Ethelmer Life to Woman 1896
- Ellis Ethelmer Phases of Love: As it Is As it may Be 1897

The pseudonym "Ellis Ethelmer" is often wrongly attributed to Elizabeth Clarke Wolstenholme Elmy but it is in fact the pseudonym of her husband Benjamin Elmy.
