= The Westminster Review =

Quarterly British publication

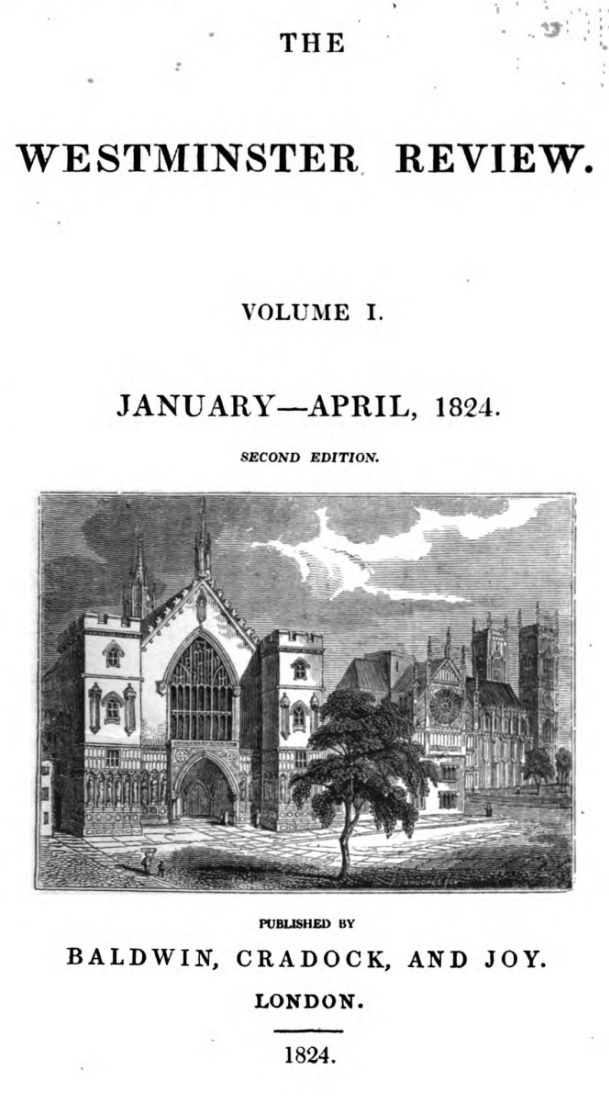
- Frontispiece of volume 1 (January–April 1824)
- Frequency: Quarterly
- Founder: Jeremy Bentham
- Founded: 1823
- First issue: January 1824
- Final issue: 1914
- Country: United Kingdom
- Based in: London
- Language: English

The Westminster Review was a quarterly British publication. Established in 1823 as the official organ of the Philosophical Radicals, it was published from 1824 to 1914. James Mill was one of the driving forces behind the liberal journal until 1828.

== History ==
=== Early years ===
In 1823, the paper was founded (and funded) by Jeremy Bentham, who had long pondered the possibility of establishing a journal for propagating Radical views. The first edition of the journal (January 1824) featured an article by James Mill (continued in the second by his son John Stuart Mill), which served as a provocative reprobation of a rival, more well-established journal, the Edinburgh Review, castigating it as an organ of the Whig party, and for sharing the latter's propensity for fence-sitting in the aristocratic interest. The controversy drew in a wide public response, much however critical: the Nuttall Encyclopædia, published in 1907, notes that the Breeches Review became a nickname for the journal because Francis Place, a breeches-maker, was a major shareholder in the enterprise. American critic and activist John Neal also published many articles in these early years while serving as Bentham's personal secretary.

The review quickly reached a circulation of three thousand, but, despite that, was not able to break even; and when by 1828 the original funding was exhausted it was sold to another proprietor and no longer functioned in the Radical interest.

In 1834 Sir William Molesworth funded a new Radical review, to be edited (informally) by J. S. Mill, and called the London Review. Shortly after, Molesworth bought the Westminster Review’’ and merged the two; and from April 1836 to March 1840 the journal resulting from the merger was published under the title London and Westminster Review. After March 1840 and for the following decade publication continued under the title The Westminster Review, but with William Edward Hickson in place of Mill as editor. Though financial difficulties continued, Mill concluded of the period that "it is highly creditable to him [Hickson] that he was able to maintain, in some tolerable degree, the character of the Review as an organ of radicalism and progress".

=== Later developments ===
In 1851 the journal was acquired by John Chapman based at 142 the Strand, London, a publisher who originally had medical training. The then unknown Mary Ann Evans, later better known by her pen name of George Eliot, had brought together his authors, including Francis Newman, W. R. Greg, Harriet Martineau and the young journalist Herbert Spencer who had been working and living cheaply in the offices of The Economist opposite Chapman's house. These authors met during that summer to give their support to this flagship of free thought and reform, joined by others including John Stuart Mill, the physiologist William Benjamin Carpenter, Robert Chambers and George J. Holyoake. They were later joined by Thomas Huxley, an ambitious young ship's surgeon determined to become a naturalist.

John Oxenford's anonymous 1853 article, "Iconoclasm in German Philosophy", was translated and published in the Vossische Zeitung. This led to a new interest in Schopenhauer's writings.

Mary Ann Evans (George Eliot) became assistant editor and produced a four–page prospectus setting out their common beliefs in progress, ameliorating ills and rewards for talent, setting out a loosely defined evolutionism as "the fundamental principle" of what she and Chapman called the "Law of Progress". The group was divided over the work of Thomas Malthus, with Holyoake opposing it as the principle of the workhouse which blamed the poor for their poverty, while to Greg and Martineau this was a law of nature encouraging responsibility and self-improvement. Chapman asked Herbert Spencer to write about this divisive matter for the first issue, and Spencer's "A Theory of Population, deduced from the General Law of Animal Fertility" actually appeared in the second issue, supporting the painful Malthusian principle as both true and self-correcting.

After 1853 John Tyndall joined Huxley in running the science section of the Westminster Review and formed a group of evolutionists who helped pave the way for Charles Darwin's 1859 publication of On the Origin of Species and gave evolutionary ideas backing in the ensuing debate. The term "Darwinism" was first put in print by Huxley in his review of The Origin, in the April 1860 issue of the Westminster Review, which hailed the book as "a veritable Whitworth gun in the armoury of liberalism", promoting scientific naturalism over theology and praising the usefulness of Darwin's ideas while expressing professional reservations about Darwin's gradualism and doubting if it could be proved that natural selection could form new species. In 1886 the Review published an essay by Edward Aveling and Eleanor Marx, "The Woman Question: From A Socialist Point of View".

After a change of ownership in 1887, when it converted to a monthly, it ceased to function on the same progressive and intellectual level. John Chapman died in Paris on 25 November 1894, as the result of being run over by a cab, and his wife Hannah took over the editorship of the Review.

== Westminster and Foreign Quarterly Review ==
The Foreign Quarterly Review was an independent London-based quarterly that published from July 1827 to July 1846 (volume 37). In October 1846 the Foreign Quarterly Review merged with the Westminster Review. Until January 1847 the journal resulting from the merger was simultaneously published under two different titles: the Foreign Quarterly and Westminster Review and the Westminster and Foreign Quarterly Review; after January 1847, the journal was published under the title the Westminster and Foreign Quarterly Review. The last issue under the title Westminster and Foreign Quarterly Review was published in October 1851 (volume 56, no. 2); after that issue the journal was published under the title Westminster Review and continued thus until it ceased publication in 1914.

== Notable contributors ==
- John Bowring
- Emilia Dilke
- George Eliot
- George Grote
- Thomas Huxley
- Anna Kingsford
- Harriet Martineau
- James Mill
- Harriet McIlquham
- John Stuart Mill
- John Neal
- Thomas Love Peacock
- Herman George Scheffauer
- Mary Shelley
- Herbert Spencer
- John Tyndall
- Caroline Cornwallis
- Julia Wedgwood
- Elizabeth Clarke Wolstenholme Elmy writing as Ignota
