= Amy Hurlston =

British journalist (1865–1949)

- Born: 1865; Coventry, Warwickshire, England
- Died: 1949 (aged 83–84); Ledbury, Herefordshire, England
- Occupations: journalist, trade unionist, social campaigner
- Organization(s): Women's Trade Union League (UK), Women's Emancipation Union

Amy Eliza Hurlston (1865–1949) was a British journalist, editor, social campaigner and trade unionist.

== Family ==
Hurlston was born in Coventry, Warwickshire, in 1865. She was the daughter of Alfred Hurlston, a Spon End watchmaker, and his wife Emma Elizabeth Hurlston (née Deacon).

She was engaged to a man named Theodore Edmond and sued him for breach of contact when he ended the engagement a month before the wedding was due to take place in 1897. She married surgeon William Wright Wilson in Sheffield, South Yorkshire, in 1909.

== Career ==
Hurlston worked as a journalist. She published in the monthly bicycling journal The Wheel World, from November 1884 to June 1885, contributed to the journal Womanhood, wrote to the Coventry Times and Warwickshire Journal and later became "Lady editor" of the Sheffield Weekly Telegraph. She also published a work of fiction, Played Out and Lost, in 1885.

She was a member of the Women’s Trade Union League, and was a Coventry Poor Law Guardian. She persuaded the Poor Law Union board to employ a night nurse for the infirmary in 1901. In 1895, she gave evidence to the Royal Commission on the Aged Poor, explaining how women were disadvantaged in old age after speaking to working-class women across the Midlands. Hurlston raised issues women experienced in saving for their future pension provision, including low wages, marriage, intermittent employment (for example, needing to stop working due to the home duties of raising children or caring for other family members and seasonal fluctuations), and life expectancy. She shared how servants in the Midlands were paid about two or three shillings a week, which was not enough to allow them to join a friendly society, let alone save for the future.

Hurlston was also an early member of the Women’s Emancipation Union, an organisation founded by her friend Elizabeth Clarke Wolstenholme-Elmy, and presented a paper to the annual conference held on 16 March 1893 titled The Factory Work of Women in the Midlands. She was appointed secretary of the Coventry branch in 1905.

== Death ==
Hurlston stepped back from campaigning after her marriage and died in Ledbury, Herefordshire, in 1949.
