= Norrisson Cavendish Scatcherd =

English antiquarian

- Born: 29 February 1780; Morley, Yorkshire, England
- Died: 16 February 1853 (aged 72)
- Occupation: Antiquarian

Norrisson Cavendish Scatcherd (29 February 1780 – 16 February 1853) was an English antiquarian.

== Biography ==
Scatcherd was born at Morley, Yorkshire, on 29 February 1780, was eldest son of Watson Scatcherd, a successful barrister on the northern circuit. His family had been resident at Morley for two centuries. After attending Marylebone and Hipperholme schools and graduating at Cambridge, was called to the bar from Gray's Inn on 28 November 1806. But being possessed of ample means, he soon forsook the law for literary and antiquarian pursuits. On 16 January 1851 he was elected a fellow of the Society of Antiquaries. He died at Morley on 16 February 1853, leaving a widow and six children. His youngest son Oliver Scatcherd married Alice Cliff Scatcherd. Scatcherd was author of: 1. ‘The History of Morley … Yorkshire,’ 8vo, Leeds, 1830; an excellent book, compiled from original sources. 2. ‘Memoirs of the celebrated Eugene Aram,’ 8vo, London, 1832; another edit. 1838. 3. ‘Gleanings after Eugene Aram,’ 8vo, London, 1840. 4. ‘The Chapel of King Edward III on Wakefield Bridge,’ 8vo, London, 1843. Scatcherd was a contributor to the ‘Gentleman's Magazine’ and Hone's ‘Year’ and ‘Table’ books.
