= Caroline Cornwallis =

English feminist writer (1786–1858)

Caroline Frances Cornwallis (1786 – 8 January 1858) was an English feminist writer. Her father, William Cornwallis, belonged to the junior branch of the better known military and naval family. The daughter of a Kent rector who had been an Oxford fellow, Caroline read voraciously on both religious and secular matters throughout her childhood. Later, she travelled widely for her times, to Italy and to Malta. She mastered Greek, Latin and Hebrew, and also among modern languages, Italian, German and French. She also worked on Icelandic and other Scandinavian languages.

When it came to her turn to take up the pen, she built herself a role as a discreet, usually anonymous, voice for the underprivileged and under-educated. If the widest group she championed in this way were the poor in Victorian England, she also spoke out for the rights of women. She was wedded to her faith, a moderate Anglicanism that rejected as excessive the attitudes of Edward Bouverie Pusey and the Oxford Movement: she wrote "We have abundance of technical terms but have we the spirit of the Gospel?"

== Early life ==
She was born in 1786 and spent her childhood living at the rectory of St John the Baptist Church in Wittersham, Kent, where her father was rector from 1778. Her mother, Mary Cornwallis, published Observations, Critical, Explanatory and Practical on the Canonical Scriptures, in 1817. Caroline had an elder sister, Sarah, born in 1779, who died a month after the birth of her son in 1803; the much-loved grandchild and nephew born on that occasion, James, died twelve years later. The double tragedy marked the family, including Caroline herself, deeply.

In 1806, Caroline turned down an offer of marriage from Jean Charles Léonard de Sismondi, a Swiss refugee of Italian origin who had spent some time living as a refugee from revolutionary turmoil, in the home of a neighbouring parish vicar, just a few miles from Wittersham. Despite her refusal of his offer of marriage, Caroline remained a close friend of Sismondi and from 1826 to 1828 she spent time as a tenant of his family home, in Pescia Italy. She returned home when news of her father's death reached her. In 1835 she made one further journey abroad, visiting another family friend, the diplomat John Hookham Frere in Malta. With the death of two friends in Italy, Sismondi's nephew Giulio Forti in 1838 and Sismondi himself four years later, she seems to have decided to stop travelling abroad, although she had been contemplating a return to Italy in 1836.

== Later life and major writings ==
Cornwallis wrote, edited or closely collaborated in a series of 22 Short Books on Great Subjects. They covered aspects of philosophy and science, the roots of philosophy in ancient Greece, the origins and development of Christianity and various areas of education or the law. The eighteenth of these, The Philosophy of the Ragged Schools of 1851, states her views about the need to educate the poor. She argues that, among other benefits, the poor once educated will be less likely to drift into crime. This was a subject to which she returned in 1851 when she shared the prize for a competition on Juvenile Delinquency proposed by Lady Noel Byron. These essays published in 1853. She showed herself well informed on developments in education that had been made in continental Europe and in the United States, and argued for the need to make education a pleasure and relevant to the concerns of the students, since ‘religion unaccompanied by knowledge degenerates into superstition.’

Her compilation - "Christian Sects in the Nineteenth Century, In a Series of Letters to a Lady" published in 1846, by William Pickering, London,( Project Gutenberg eBook), is interesting.

Amongst these publications, she wrote a novel Pericles: a Tale of Athens in the 83rd Olympiad. For all her admiration of the great orator Pericles, she was most struck by the fact that one of his greatest speeches had in fact been written by his mistress Aspasia. This was a theme which Cornwallis took up explicitly in the last of a series of articles she published in the Westminster Review between 1854 and 1857, where she based herself on the role played by women, notably Florence Nightingale at Scutari during the Crimean War, in order to urge a review of the whole role of women in society.

Caroline Cornwallis, like Aspasia, was a woman who remained in the shadows herself but who found a voice to speak for causes that would lead to some of the major changes that marked not just her own nation but many others after her death in 1858. She did this by building on her learning, to mount a quiet, dignified campaign of intellectual endeavour which nonetheless kept up the pressure on power. In her own words, "... we shall keep up a rumble in the ears of our law-makers."

=== References ===
- Stephen, Leslie, ed. (1887). "Cornwallis, Caroline Frances" . Dictionary of National Biography. Vol. 12. London: Smith, Elder & Co.
- Barber, Madeline J. Scholar Daughter of the Rectory: The Life of Caroline Frances Cornwallis 1786-1858 (2007)
