= Morley Town Hall =

Municipal building in Morley, West Yorkshire, England

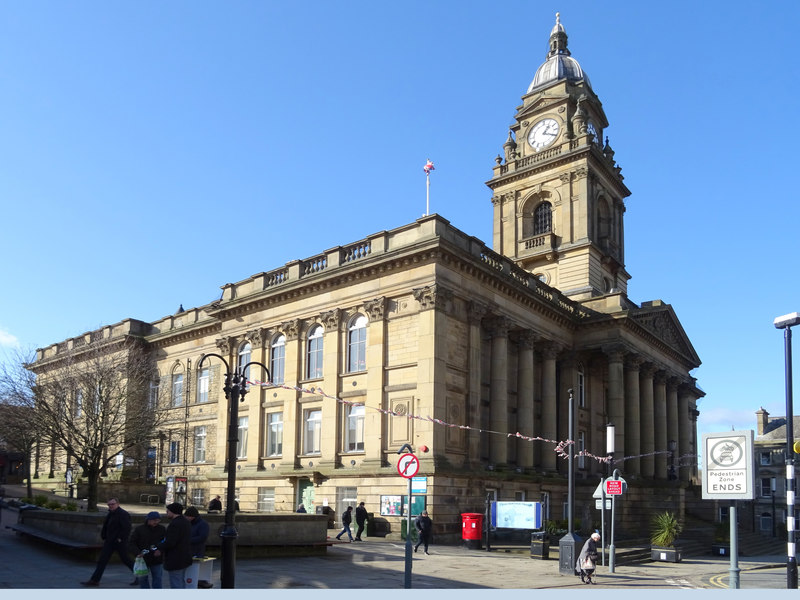
- Morley Town Hall

- Shown in West Yorkshire
- 53.7459°N 1.6019°W
- Location: Queen Street, Morley

History
- Built: 1895

Site notes
- Architect(s): Henry Holtom and George Arthur Fox
- Architectural style: Neoclassical style

Listed Building – Grade I
- Designated: 12 March 1980
- Reference no.: 1135112

Morley Town Hall is a municipal facility in Morley, West Yorkshire, England. The town hall, which is the meeting place of Morley Town Council, is a Grade I listed building.

== History ==
Previously the local board of health in Morley had met in a room in a building in Queen Street. After the town secured borough status in 1885, the first Mayor of Morley, Joseph Schofield, ran a design competition for a new town hall: there were 73 entries submitted. The competition was won by Henry Holtom and George Arthur Fox from Dewsbury with a Neoclassical style design. The foundation stone was laid by Tom Clough, the then Mayor of Morley, on 8 October 1892. The building cost over £41,000 to build and featured a colonnade with a Roman frieze on the pediment and a domed clock tower which is 160 feet high. A Cambridge-chiming clock, known as the "Sam Rhodes Clock" (named after Councillor Sam Rhodes, the chairman of the Town Hall Committee) was installed in the tower in April 1895; it had been manufactured by Potts & Sons of Leeds, and the accompanying five bells were by John Warner & Sons. The building was officially opened by H. H. Asquith MP (who had been born in Morley) on 16 October 1895.

Queen Elizabeth II, accompanied by the Duke of Edinburgh, visited the building and had coffee with the civic leaders on 28 October 1954.

On the morning of 18 August 1961, a fire broke out in the nearby Albert Mills which, before demolition, were used for storing paper. As the mill burned, sparks and burning paper were blown against the dome of the town hall and set alight its timber construction. Within two hours the dome was destroyed and the clock put out of action. Restoration was completed on 14 December 1962. The town hall was the headquarters of the Municipal Borough of Morley but it ceased to be the local seat of government when the enlarged Leeds City Council was formed in 1974. Instead it became the meeting place of Morley Town Council.

== Art in the town hall ==
Ellen Mary Rope painted three tall bas-reliefs ("Faith", "Hope" and "Charity"), high up above the dais in the Alexandra Hall in autumn 1895. In 1902, a marble bust of Queen Victoria by Frances Darlington was unveiled on the grand staircase.

== Events in the town hall ==
The town hall has been the venue for various concerts and films: the Grimethorpe Colliery Band recorded one of their "Brass From The Masters" albums in the town hall in 1999 and the ITV show Emmerdale used the town hall for both interior and exterior shots in spring 2007.

== See also ==
- Grade I listed buildings in West Yorkshire
- Listed buildings in Morley, West Yorkshire
