= Women's Franchise League =

UK organization

The Women's Franchise League was a British organisation for partial women's suffrage founded by the suffragette Emmeline Pankhurst, her husband Richard Pankurst, Elizabeth Clarke Wolstenholme Elmy, Alice Cliff Scatcherd and other activists at the Pankhurst's home in London in 1889. The organisation was founded fourteen years before the creation of the Women's Social and Political Union (WSPU), which was founded in 1903. The President of the organisation in 1889 was Harriet McIlquham. Members included Harriot Stanton Blatch and Florence Miller.

In 1895 the committee who met in Aberystwyth were Ursula Mellor Bright, Mrs Behrens, Esther Bright, Herbert Burrows, Dr Clark MP, Mrs Hunter of Matlock Bank, Jane Brownlow, Mrs E. James (who lived locally), H. N. Mozley, Alice Cliff Scatcherd, Countess Gertrude Guillaume-Schack, Jane Cobden Unwin and Richard and Emmeline Pankhurst.

The organization's main achievement was to secure the vote for some married women in local elections after the campaigning of its members, whereas up to the Local Government Act 1894 voting in municipal elections was only available to some single women.

The league was dissolved in 1903. It left minimal records behind.

== See also ==
- List of British suffragists and suffragettes
- List of women's rights activists
- Timeline of women's suffrage
- Women's suffrage in the United Kingdom
- Women's suffrage organizations
