= St Mary's in the Wood Church, Morley =

Congregational church in Morley, West Yorkshire, England

St Mary's in the Wood Church
- St Mary's in the Wood Church, Morley
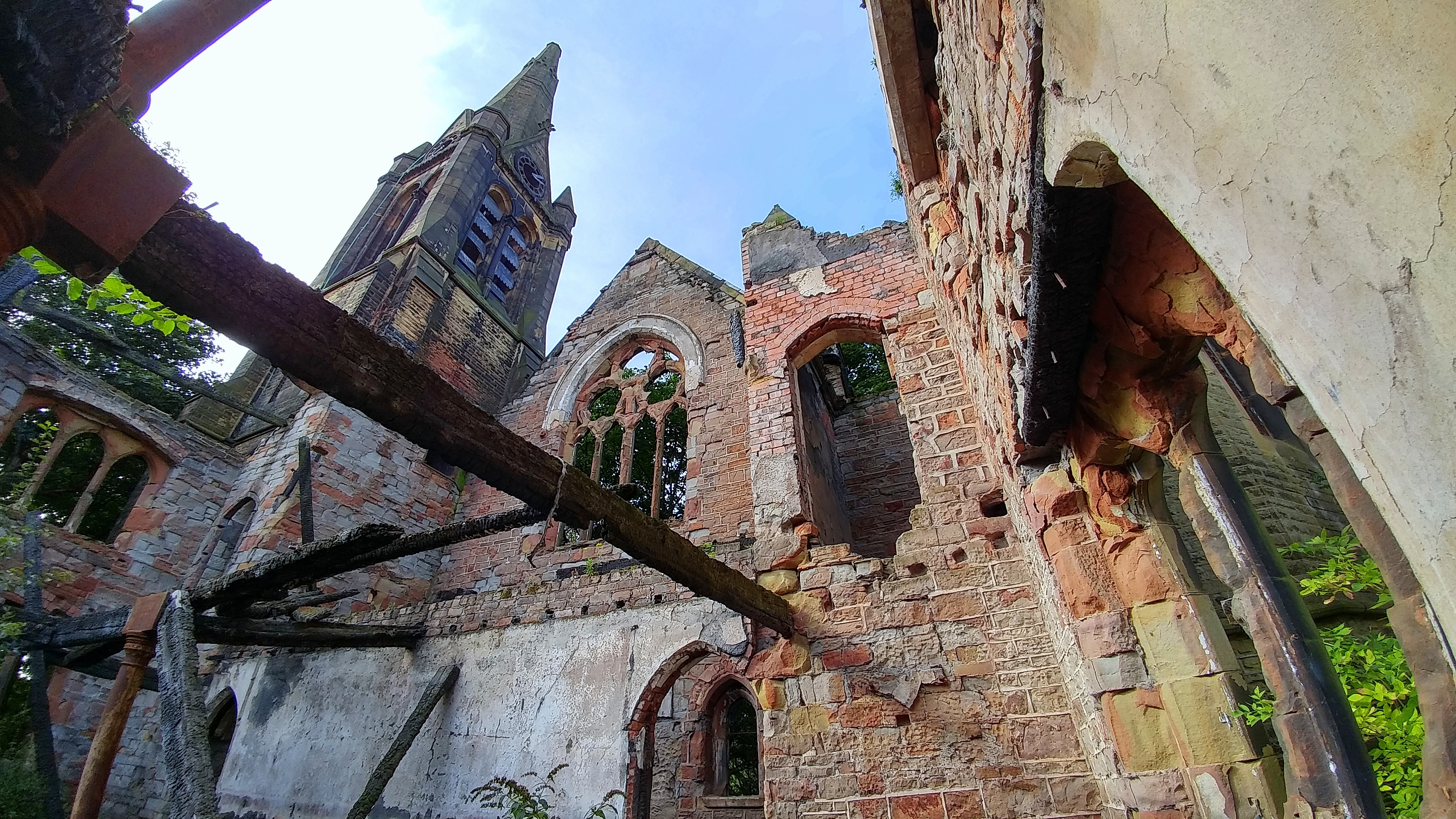
- The former St Mary's in the Wood Church after fire damage
- St Mary's in the Wood Church
- 53.747833°N 1.601534°W
- OS grid reference: SE 26380 28012
- Location: Morley, West Yorkshire
- Country: England
- Denomination: United Reformed Church
- Website: https://stmarysinthewoodmorleyurc.org.uk/

Architecture
- Functional status: Derelict
- Style: Gothic revival

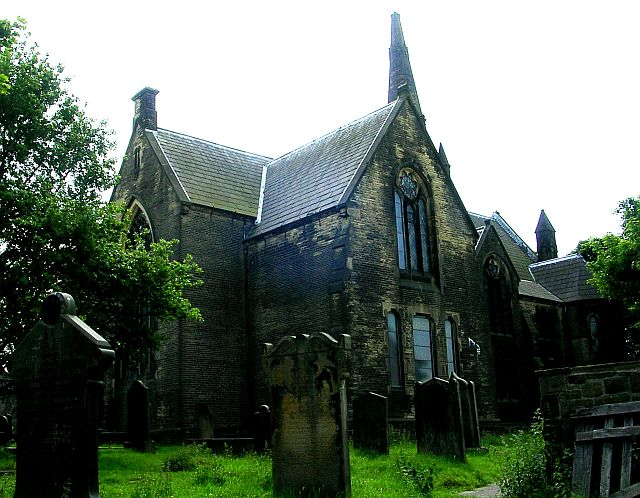
Church and graveyard prior to fire

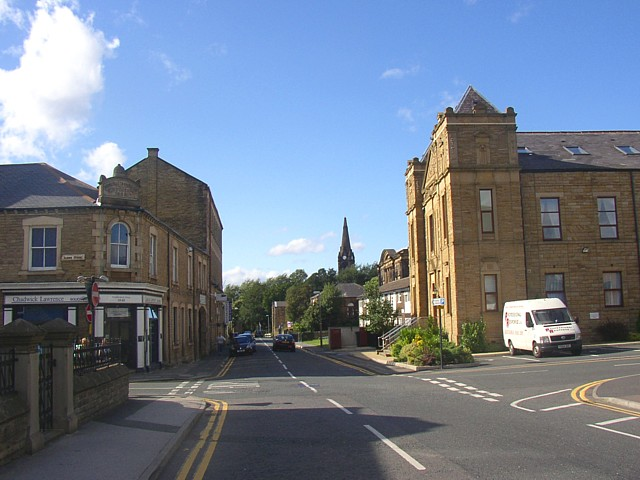
Spire seen from Commercial Street

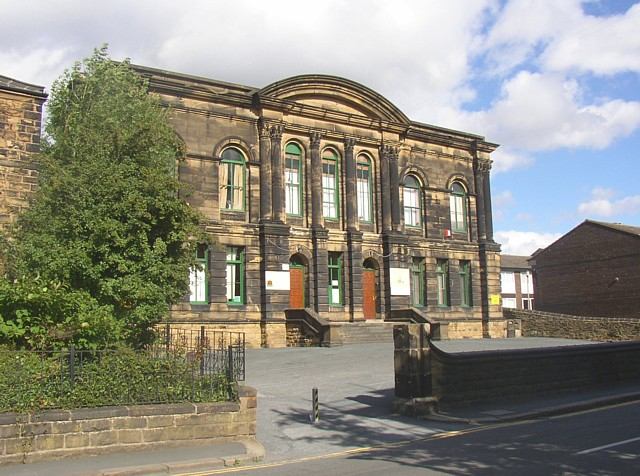
Current meeting place of the congregation on Commercial Street

St Mary's in the Wood Church was a United Reformed Church place of worship in Morley, West Yorkshire, England. The church, built in 1876-78 on the site of a medieval church, is grade II listed. It was already redundant when partially destroyed by a fire in 2010; its previous Sunday School building was known as St Mary's in the Wood Church from 2010, until being sold to Leeds City Council in 2023. As of 2025 the congregation of St Mary's in the Wood Church meets in the Wesley Room of Morley's Central Methodist Church.

== History ==
There had been a church on the site, now at the meeting of Troy Road and Commercial Road, at the time of the Domesday Book, and parts of a 13th century chapel survived in the building in the 1830s, then known as "The Old Chapel". There was major building work in the 1860s, but by 1875 the congregation had outgrown the building and it was demolished and replaced by a new church, designed by Lockwood and Mawson and built at a cost of £7000, which opened in 1878. It is grade II listed. The parsonage of the Old Chapel had been on a separate plot of land, on Commercial Street, and was also demolished in 1875. Between 1898 and 1900 a new Sunday School was built on that site. It is now also a grade II listed building, listed as "St Mary's in the Wood Church Hall".

In 2008 the congregation was too small for the church, and sold it to a developer who planned to build a hotel on the site. The congregation moved to the Sunday School building, which was then renamed as the church. The church sat derelict until 2010, when a fire destroyed large parts of the church, leaving only the spire and parts of the outer walls.

In 2023, Leeds City Council purchased the nearby former Sunday School building, then known as the church, for use as a "learning and skills centre" operated by the Luminate Education Group, as part of a wider development scheme known as Morley Town Deal, with funding from the government's Town's Fund. The congregation held their final service in the former Sunday School in September 2023, and as of February 2025 are meeting for worship in the Wesley Room of Morley Central Methodist Church.

The site was sold at auction for £100,000 on 30 September 2026.

== Graveyard ==
The graveyard includes many grade II listed memorials, dating from 1667 to 1740 and including the Scatcherd Mausoleum, grave slabs and chest tombs.

== Gallery ==
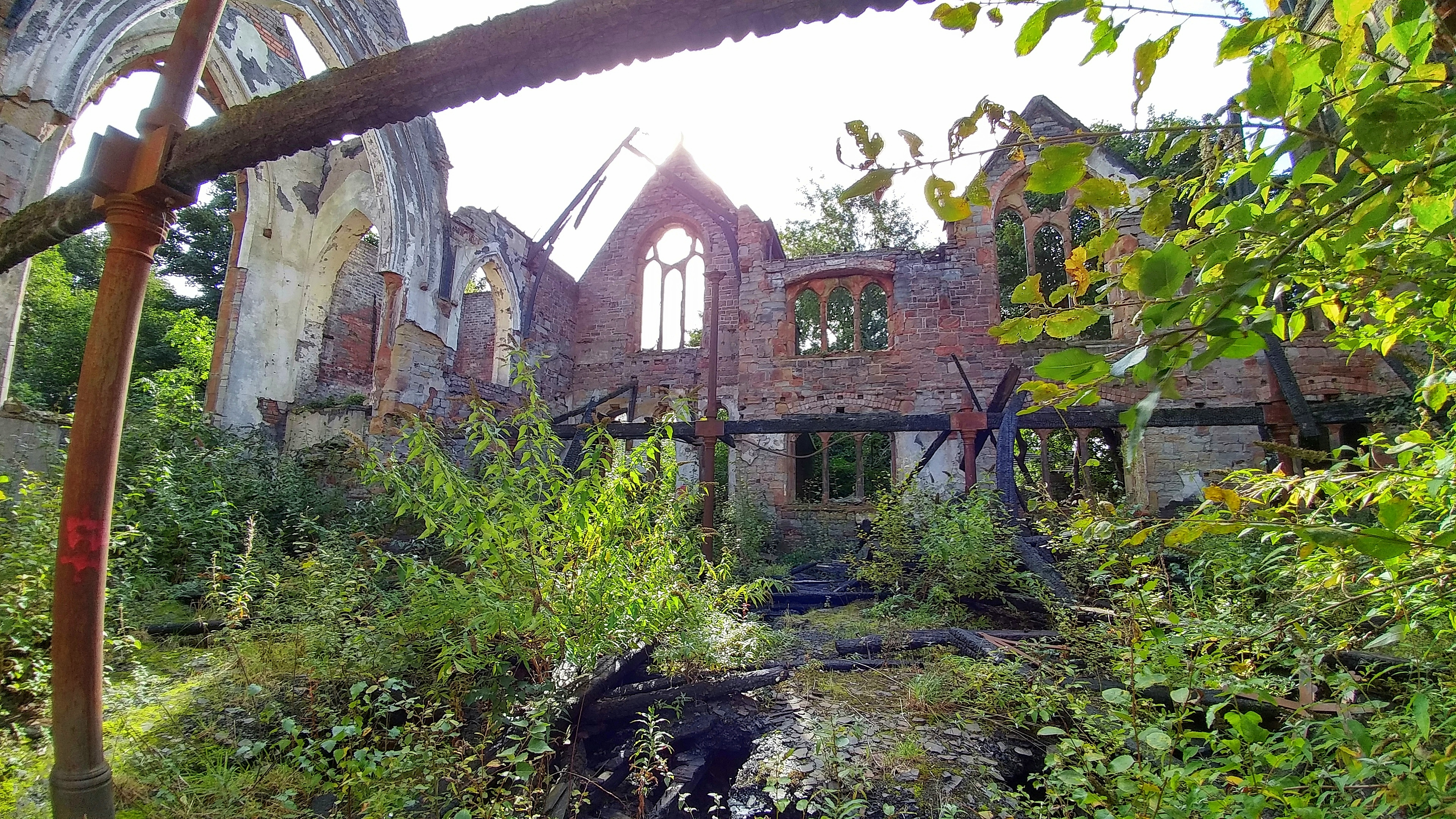

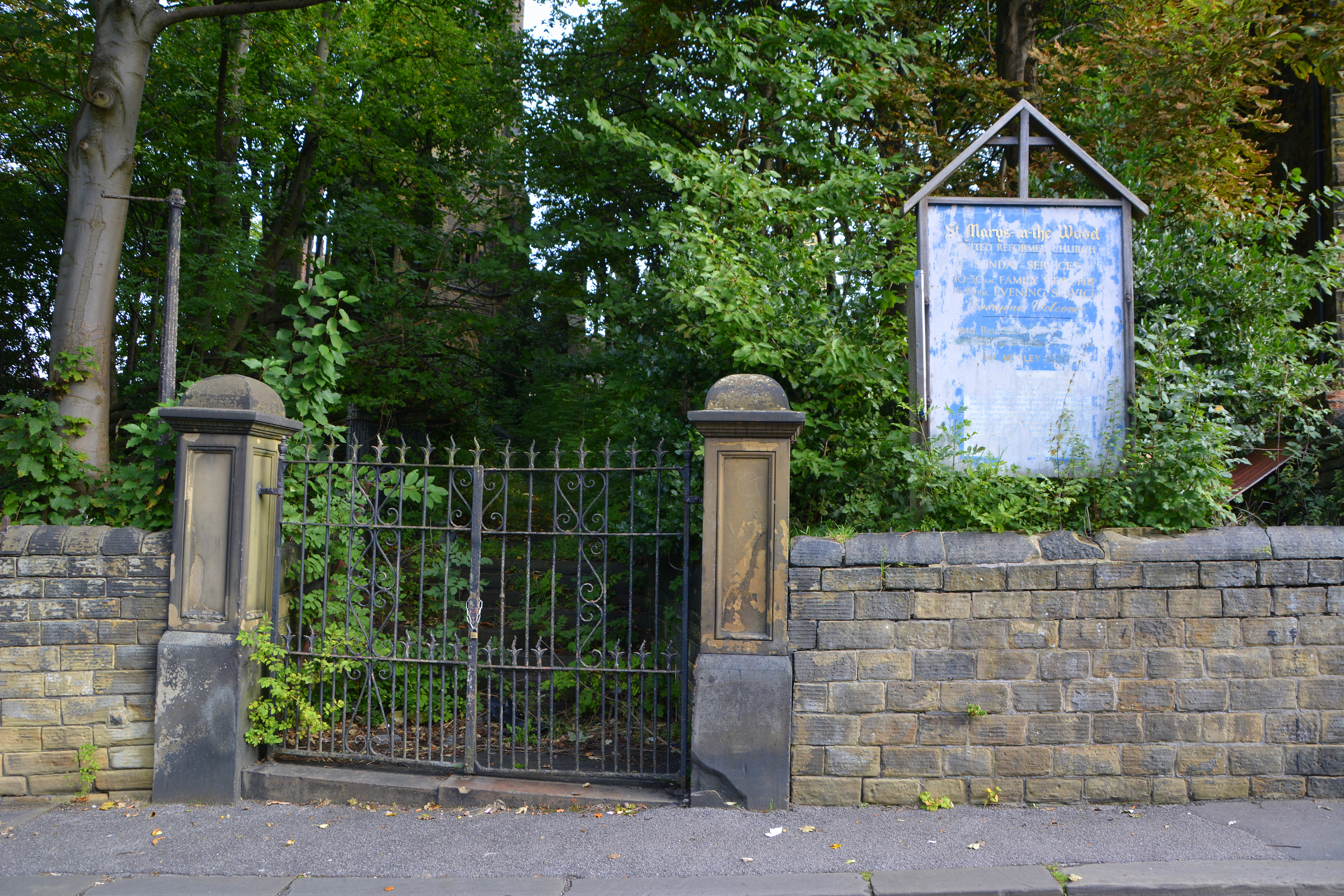

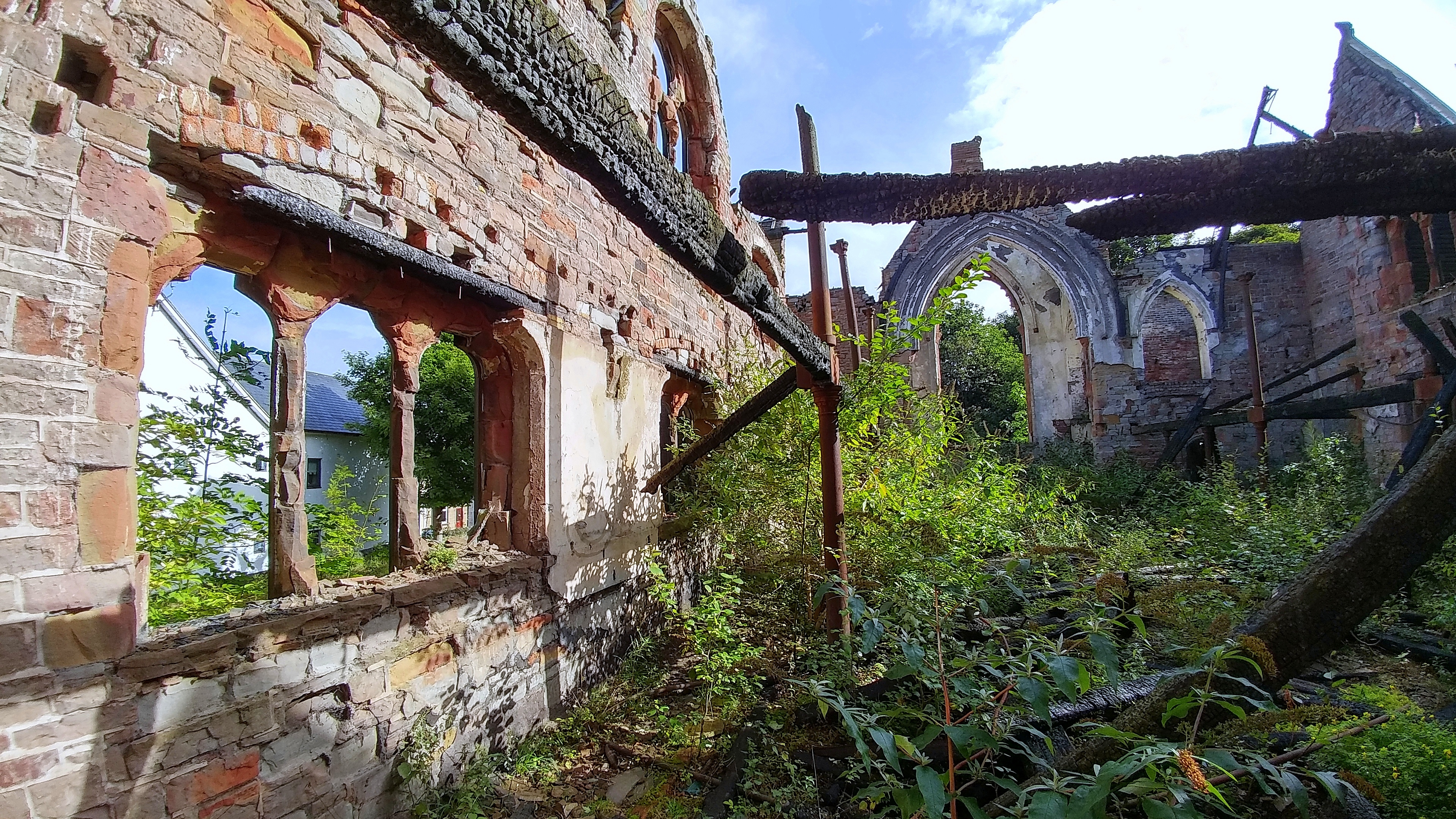

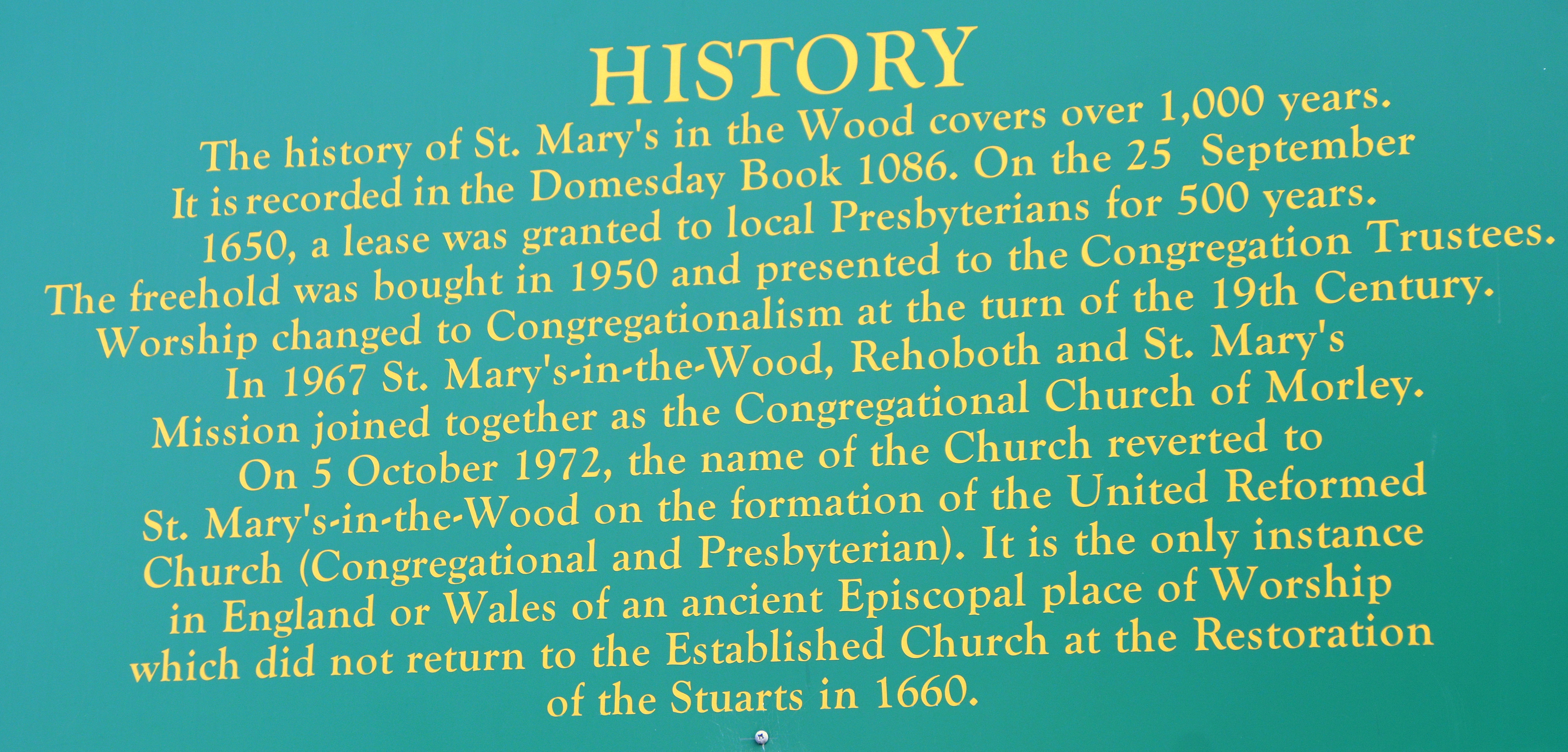

== See also ==
- Listed buildings in Morley, West Yorkshire
