= Listed buildings in Morley, West Yorkshire =

Morley is a civil parish in the metropolitan borough of the City of Leeds, West Yorkshire, England. The parish contains 56 listed buildings that are recorded in the National Heritage List for England. Of these, one is listed at Grade I, the highest of the three grades, and the others are at Grade II, the lowest grade. The parish contains the town of Morley and the surrounding area. Most of the listed buildings are houses, cottages, and associated structures. The other listed buildings include churches, church halls, memorials in the churchyards, including a mausoleum, former mill buildings, Sunday schools, milestones, railway bridges, a former poor house, banks, a public library, a town hall, and a war memorial.

== Key ==
Grade	Criteria
I	Buildings of exceptional interest, sometimes considered to be internationally important
II	Buildings of national importance and special interest

== Buildings ==
Name and location	Photograph	Date	Notes	Grade
St Mary's Church, Woodkirk; 53.72115°N 1.58951°W		Early 13th century	The body of the church was largely rebuilt in 1831–34, and the tower has restored in about 1911. It is built in stone with a stone slate roof, and consists of a nave, a south porch, a chancel and a north vestry, and a west tower. The tower is unbuttressed and has three stages, a plinth, a moulded string course, a lancet window, a clock face on the west front, paired bell openings with colonnettes, an embattled parapet with corner pinnacles, and a weathervane. The east window has five lights.	II
Swindon House and Yew Tree Cottage; 53.74972°N 1.60272°W	—	Mid to late 17th century	A house that was extended to the rear in the 19th century and later divided, it is in stone, roughcast on the front, and has a stone slate roof with coped gables, kneelers, blocked niches, and ball finials. There are two storeys, a double-depth plan, and a front with two gables, each with a doorway and sash windows. On the returns are two gables, and on the front is an inscribed plaque.	II
Cross Hall West and Cross Hall East; 53.73822°N 1.61303°W	—	Late 17th century	A house that was later extended and divided, it is in stone with Welsh slate roof, two storeys and two ranges. The left range has four bays, the right bay gabled. The doorway has a chamfered and pointed surround, a Gothic fanlight and side lights, all under a moulded hood. The windows are cross casements. The earlier range to the right has five bays, a central gabled porch, and casement windows. The right return is rendered and contains a Diocletian window. At the rear the windows vary, and include mullioned windows, sashes, a round-headed staircase window, and a two-storey canted bay window.	II
Scatcherd Mausoleum; 53.74761°N 1.60107°W		Late 17th century	The mausoleum is in the churchyard of St Mary in the Wood Church. It is in stone and has a single storey, a square plan, quoin pilasters, a cornice, a blocking course, and corner pyramidal finials. In the centre is an arched doorway with a moulded surround and an impost band, set in a slightly recessed ogee arch. Above the doorway are tablets with inscriptions, and over the arch is a stone carved with a skull and crossbones.	II
Group of four raised slabs northeast of the Scatcherd Mausoleum; 53.74773°N 1.60100°W	—	1667	The four raised slabs are in the churchyard of St Mary in the Wood Church and are dated 1667, 1675, 1695 and 1717. They consist of stone slabs on raised panelled bases, and form an L-shaped plan. The slabs are carved with inscriptions, decorations and motifs.	II
Six raised slabs south of the church 53.74778°N 1.60146°W	—	1671	There are five raised slabs and a taller chest tomb in the churchyard of St Mary in the Wood Church dated between 1671 and 1741. They are arranged in two rows of three, and are carved with inscriptions, decorations and motifs.	II
Nine raised slabs south-southeast of the church 53.74775°N 1.60115°W	—	1674	The nine raised slabs are in the churchyard of St Mary in the Wood Church dated between 1674 and 1743. They are arranged in three rows, and are carved with inscriptions, decorations and motifs.	II
Three raised tomb slabs north of the church 53.74795°N 1.60149°W	—	1676	The raised slabs are in the churchyard of St Mary in the Wood Church to the north of the church, and are dated 1676, 1707 and 1750. They are carved with inscriptions, decorations and motifs.	II
Two grave slabs dated 1681 and 1744; 53.72108°N 1.58936°W	—	1681	The grave slabs are in the churchyard of St Mary's Church, Woodkirk to the south of the chancel. They are raised on stone slabs and are carved with inscriptions, decorations and motifs.	II
Five tombs east of the church 53.74784°N 1.60113°W	—	1681	The chest tombs are in the churchyard of St Mary in the Wood Church to the east of the church, and are dated 1681, 1689, 1691, 1738 and 1743. They consist of stone slabs on raised panelled bases, are carved with inscriptions, decorations and motifs.	II
Morley Hall; 53.74878°N 1.60378°W	—	1683	The house, which was later altered and extended, is in stone and has a Welsh blue slate roof with coped gables, kneelers and a ball finial. There are two storeys and a front of three bays. In the left bay is a full-height canted bay window with an embattled parapet. The middle bay has a porch with monolithic jambs and a moulded cornice and to the left is a semicircular-arched stair window with voussoirs and a keystone. The gabled right wing projects and contains quoins, and a canted bay window with a cornice. In the left return is a 17th-century doorway with tie-stone jambs, a moulded surround, and a dated lintel. To the left is a later range at right angles, containing two full-height bay windows with mullioned windows and embattled parapets. The other windows in the house are sashes.	II
Three raised tombs north of the Scatcherd Mausoleum; 53.74772°N 1.60131°W	—	1691	A row of three stone slabs in the churchyard of St Mary in the Wood Church. They are on raised panelled bases, and are dated 1691, 1715 and 1718. The slabs are carved with inscriptions, decorations and motifs.	II
Chest tomb and raised grave slab 53.74789°N 1.60183°W	—	1699	The chest tomb and grave slab are in the churchyard of St Mary in the Wood Church, to the northwest of the corner of the church. They are carved with inscriptions, decorations and motifs.	II
Three chest tombs east of the church 53.74791°N 1.60093°W	—	1722	The chest tombs are in the churchyard of St Mary in the Wood Church to the east of the church, and are dated 1720, 1723 and 1739. They form an L-shaped group, they are in stone, and each consists of a raised slab with panelled sides. The inscriptions are all in a similar script.	II
Two grave slabs dated 1725 and 1746; 53.72104°N 1.58981°W	—	1725	The grave slabs are in the churchyard of St Mary's Church, Woodkirk to the south of the entrance path. They are raised on stone slabs and are carved with inscriptions, decorations and motifs.	II
Manor Farm Barn; 53.71919°N 1.58421°W	—	Early 18th century	The barn is in stone with gutter brackets, a roof of Welsh blue slate, and four bays. In the second bay is a cart entry with a monolithic lintel, and the third bay has a window with a monolithic lintel. In the right return are two triangular vents, and a rectangular pitching hole.	II
Two chest tombs and two grave slabs 53.72103°N 1.58972°W	—	1728	The chest tombs and grave slabs are in the churchyard of St Mary's Church, Woodkirk to the south of the porch. They are in stone and are carved with inscriptions, decorations and motifs.	II
Raised slab northwest of the Scatcherd Mausoleum; 53.74768°N 1.60132°W	—	1740	The slab is in the churchyard of St Mary in the Wood Church to the south of the church, and is dated 1740. It is raised on a panelled base, and has a channelled surround and a carved arched head with an impost, a keystone, trumpeting angels in the spandrels, and an inscription.	II
37 High Street; 53.74118°N 1.59838°W	—	1766	A stone house with quoins, and a stone slate roof with coped gables and shaped kneelers. There are two storeys, a double-depth plan, and two bays. The doorway has a deep lintel with a carved datestone above, and the windows have plain surrounds.	II
House and cottage, Rods Mill Lane; 53.74230°N 1.59671°W	—	Late 18th century	The cottage is the earlier, the house dating from the 19th century, and they in stone with stone slate roofs. The cottage has two storeys at the front, three at the rear, two bays at the front, and attached to the rear is a two-storey two-bay range. On the front is a doorway with tie-stone jambs, and mullioned windows. The house has a plinth, a sill band, an eaves cornice, and a hipped roof. There are two storeys and a symmetrical front of five bays, the middle three bays projecting under a pedimented gable. Steps lead up to a central doorway with engaged Doric columns, an entablature, and a dentilled cornice. The windows have flat arches, and at the rear is a tall central stair window.	II
Manor House Farmhouse; 53.76492°N 1.58546°W		Late 18th century	The former farmhouse is in red-brown brick on a plinth, with quoins and a stone slate roof. There are two storeys, a double-depth plan, and a symmetrical front of five bays. The central doorway has tie-stone jambs, above it is a blind window, and the other windows have architraves and flat brick arches. In the right return is a doorway with Doric pilasters, an entablature, and a cornice, and at the rear is a semicircular-arched stair window with impost blocks and a keystone.	II
Pair of slabs east of the church 53.74803°N 1.60098°W	—	1785	The slabs are in the churchyard of St Mary in the Wood Church to the east of the church, and are dated 1785 and 1795. The slabs are raised on panelled sides, and each has an inscription, and a semicircular carved arch with paterae in the spandrels.	II
10 Wesley Road; 53.74450°N 1.60200°W		c. 1790	Originally two shops back to back with weavers' cottages and workshops, later converted for residential use. The building is in sandstone with a stone slate roof, three storeys and three bays. The openings have plain surrounds, and the windows on the front are paired.	II
Table tomb north of the church 53.74800°N 1.60132°W	—	1790	The table tomb is in the churchyard of St Mary in the Wood Church to the north of the church, and is dated 1790. The tomb consists of a large stone slab raised on three slabs, with the ends treated as fluted pilasters. On top of the slab is an inscription.	II
Crank Mills; 53.74937°N 1.59428°W		c. 1792	The former textile mill is in stone with stone slate roof. There are three storeys, the original building has seven bays, with a three-bay extension on the left, and four bays on the left return. The windows and taking-ing doors have plain surrounds. To the right is the engine house with a lean-to roof, containing a full-height window with a semicircular-arched head, imposts, and a keystone.	II
55, 57 and 59 Queen Street; 53.74712°N 1.60222°W		c. 1800	A row of three shops in stone with stone slate roofs. There are two storeys and six bays. In the ground floor are doorways, and shop windows with pilasters and cornices, and the upper floor contains windows of different types.	II
Tomb of Michael Wood; 53.72098°N 1.58995°W	—	1801	The chest tomb is in an enclosure in the churchyard of St Mary's Church, Woodkirk. It consists of a raised stone slab with an arched top on a panelled base, with fluted pilasters on the corners and in the centre. On the slab is an inscription and carved angels in the spandrels of the arch.	II
1–9 Station Road and 2–6 Chapel Hill; 53.74922°N 1.60153°W	—	c. 1800	A group of nine houses on a corner site, they are in stone with square gutter brackets and slate roofs. There are three storeys facing Station Road and two facing Chapel Hill. The Station Road front has six bays, the left bay canted, and the Chapel Hill front has six bays. The doorways have tie-stone jambs, and the windows have plain surrounds.	II
Croft House; 53.75054°N 1.59890°W	—	Early 19th century	The house, which was later extended to the rear, is in stone, and has a stone slate roof with coped gables. There are two storeys, a double-depth plan and a symmetrical front of three bays. The central doorway has Doric pilasters, a fanlight, an impost, an entablature, and a cornice. The windows have wedge lintels and altered glazing, and in the left return is a two-storey bay window.	II
Pair of chest tombs west of the church 53.74781°N 1.60192°W	—	1827	The chest tombs are in the churchyard of St Mary in the Wood Church to the west of the church, and are dated 1827 and 1854. They are set in a raised stone surround, and each is rectangular, it has corner balusters on the sides with three paterae in circles, and end panels with paterae in ovals. There are carved friezes, and the slabs have moulded edges and inscriptions.	II
St Peter's Church; 53.75304°N 1.60059°W		1829–30	A Commissioners' Church designed by R. D. Chantrell in Early English style, with the chancel added in 1884–85. The church is built in sandstone with a roof of Welsh blue slate, and it consists of a nave, a south transeptal chapel, a chancel, a north vestry, and a west steeple. The steeple has a tower with three stages, quoin pilasters, a doorway with a moulded surround, a pointed arch, and a hood mould with a trefoil in the apex, and it is surmounted by a broach spire. The east window has five lights, and above are three traceried rose windows.	II
St. Peter's Sunday School; 53.75253°N 1.60048°W		1832	The Sunday school is in stone on a plinth, and has a stone slate roof with coped gables and kneelers. There is a single storey, the gable end faces the road, and contains corner pilasters and three lancet windows with a hood mould. Along the sides are seven bays containing windows with chamfered surrounds, and a continuous hood mould. The middle window has a pointed arch and is flanked by dated shields, and the other windows have Tudor arches.	II
Dawson House and warehouse 53.74877°N 1.60279°W		Early to mid 19th century	A manager's house with a warehouse to the rear, later used for other purposes, the building is in stone, and has stone slate roofs with coped gables, and two storeys. The house has a symmetrical front of three bays, a central doorway with monolithic jambs and a fanlight, sash windows, and paired gutter brackets. The warehouse extends from the right return and has five bays. It contains a central taking-in bay, the doorway with tie-stone jambs, windows with monolithic lintels, and a cat-head hoist.	II
Milestone in front of Fairmead; 53.75380°N 1.59866°W		Early to mid 19th century	The milestone is on the northwest side of Victoria Road (A643 road). It is in stone with cast iron overlay, and has a triangular plan and a round-arched head. On the head is "LEEDS & ELLAND ROAD" and "MORLEY", and on the sides are the distances to Morley, Leeds, Birstall, Brighouse, and Cleckheaton.	II
Milestone near Six Arches Viaduct; 53.76443°N 1.58272°W		Early to mid 19th century	The milestone is on the southeast side of Elland Road (A643 road). It is in stone with cast iron overlay, and has a triangular plan and a round-arched head. On the head is "LEEDS & ELLAND ROAD" and "MORLEY", and on the sides are the distances to Morley, Leeds, Birstall, and Cleckheaton.	II
Park House; 53.74726°N 1.60227°W	—	Early to mid 19th century	A house, later used for other purposes, in red brick with stone dressings on a plinth, with corner pilasters, a band, an eaves band, a moulded cornice, and a hipped roof in Welsh blue slate. There are two storeys and a symmetrical front of three bays, the middle bay projecting. The central doorway has Doric pilasters, a fanlight, an entablature, a cornice, and a blocking course. The windows have slightly cambered brick arches and triple keystones.	II
Springfield House; 53.75302°N 1.60434°W		Early to mid 19th century	The house, later used for other purposes, is in stone on a plinth, with a band, and a hipped Welsh blue slate roof. There are two storeys, a symmetrical front of five bays, and an added bay to the left. In the centre is a Doric porch with an entablature, a dentilled cornice and a blocking course, and a doorway with an architrave and a fanlight. The windows are sashes, and at the rear is a round-headed stair window.	II
Churwell Bridge; 53.76189°N 1.57991°W	—	Mid 1840s	The bridge was built by the Leeds, Dewsbury and Manchester Railway as an accommodation bridge, carrying its line over a track. It is in sandstone, and consists of a single semicircular arch. The bridge has voussoirs with tooled margins, springing from jambs and an impost band. The wing walls curve and end in short square piers, and have coping stones with a moulded outer edge.	II
Railway bridge over Howley Mill Lane; 53.72262°N 1.62398°W		Mid 1840s	The bridge was built by the Leeds, Dewsbury and Manchester Railway to carry its line over Howley Mill Lane and a stream. It is in sandstone, and consists of a single segmental arch. The bridge has rusticated voussoirs springing from a low impost band, a moulded cornice, and a triangular parapet. The wing walls are raked and curved with squared coping stones. A wall running under the bridge separates the lane from the stream.	II
Central Methodist Church; 53.74423°N 1.60139°W		1860–61	The church is in stone on a plinth, with quoins, a sill band, an eaves cornice, and roof of Welsh blue slate. There are two storeys, a front of four bays, and six bays along the sides. On the front is a bracketed pedimented gable containing an oculus with an ornate frame in the tympanum. In the centre is a pair of portals with Doric piers, engaged Doric columns, and a deep entablature. The flanking windows have cambered heads with keystones, and the upper floor windows have round-arched heads and pilaster jambs, flanked by pilaster strips and cornices with fluted console brackets.	II
Former Mount Zion Chapel and cottage 53.76078°N 1.58962°W		c. 1861	The chapel, later used for other purposes, and the cottage are in sandstone with Welsh blue slate roofs, and both have two storeys and a sill band. The chapel has a plinth, quoin piers, and a three-bay symmetrical front with a moulded cornice, and a pedimented gable flanked by parapets. In the centre is a doorway with Doric pilasters, an entablature, and a cornice. The windows have round heads and keystones, and in the tympanum of the pediment is an inscribed and dated plaque. Along the right return are six bays with round-headed windows. To the left is the cottage, containing a doorway and sash windows.	II
Old Poor House; 53.76115°N 1.58914°W		1865	The poor house, later a community centre, has a stone basement, the upper parts are in red brick with quoins, a sill band, an impost band, a dogtooth and dentilled cornice, and a tile roof. There are two storeys, the entrance front has three bays and a pedimented gable containing a circular recess, and there are four bays in the right return. In the centre is a doorway with interrupted jambs flanked by windows with plain surrounds. The windows in the upper floor have ogee arches, impost blocks, and keystones, and between the windows on the front is an oval inscribed and dated plaque.	II
Commercial Street Mill and chimney 53.74566°N 1.59933°W		1869	The former mill is in orange-red brick with stone dressings on a plinth, with rusticated quoins, and a hipped Welsh blue slate roof. There are three storeys, a symmetrical front of five bays, seven bays on the right return, and a two-storey two-bay extension. In the centre of the front is a semicircular cart entry with rusticated voussoirs, quoins and a dated keystone. The loading door above the entry and the windows have segmental-ached heads and keystones. At the rear is a gabled two-storey engine house and a rectangular tapering chimney, and a single-storey two-bay building with a water tank.	II
HSBC Bank; 53.74607°N 1.60150°W	—	Late 19th century	The bank is in stone on the front and brick on the sides and rear, and at the top is a dentilled course and a balustraded parapet. There are three storeys and cellars, and six bays. In the ground floor are quoin pilasters, with a linking entablature, cornice and blocking course. The left bay has an archway with a Gibbs surround, and in the second bay is an arched doorway with a Gibbs surround, carved bracketed jambs, a pulvinated frieze, and a swan-neck pediment under a taller triangular pediment. To the right are three windows divided by Tuscan columns, and in the right bay is a doorway with a fanlight and a triangular pediment. The upper floors contain cross windows, those in the middle floor with swan-neck pediments.	II
National Westminster Bank; 53.74621°N 1.60159°W	—	Late 19th century	The bank is in stone with polished granite dressings at the front, and in brick at the rear, and has an eaves band, a dentilled cornice, and a balustraded parapet. There are three storeys and a symmetrical front of five bays, the middle three bays recessed. In the ground floor, the openings have stilted arches, chamfered surrounds, and trefoil-headed glazing bars; the outer bays contain doorways and the others have windows. The central bay of the middle floor contains a segmental oriel window with carved shields below and a balustraded parapet. The other windows are paired with basket-arched heads and mullions, the outer windows in the middle floor with balustraded balconies.	II
St Mary in the Wood Church; 53.74786°N 1.60147°W		1876–78	The church, designed by Lockwood and Mawson on the site of an earlier church, was damaged by fire in 2010. It is built in stone it had a roof of Welsh blue slate, and has a cruciform plan, with a nave, north and south transepts, a chancel, and a southwest steeple. The steeple has a four-stage tower with angle buttresses that rise to octagonal corner turrets, between which are pedimented gables containing clock faces and surmounted by a broach spire.	II
Former Methodist Sunday School; 53.74329°N 1.60069°W		1878	The Sunday school, later used for other purposes, is in stone with a Welsh blue slate roof. The front has a pedimented gable, a symmetrical front of three bays, and there are nine bays along the sides. In each bay on the front are pilasters and entablatures with semicircular arches. Steps lead up to a central semicircular-arched doorway with imposts, and above is an oculus over an inscribed frieze. In the outer bays, and in the bays along the sides, are paired round-arched windows with circular windows above.	II
Former Primitive Methodiat Chapel; 53.74329°N 1.60103°W		1885–56	The former chapel is in stone with a Welsh blue slate roof, and is in Italianate style. There are two storeys and a basement, a symmetrical front of five bays, and seven bays on the left return. The middle three bays are approached by a wide flight of steps leading to a portico with four Corinthian columns, an entablature, and a bracketed triangular pediment with an oculus in the tympanum, and a finial. In the middle three bays are two arched doorways and windows that have imposts with foliate carving and keystones. The windows in the outer bays and the left return are paired and have arched heads.	II
Lloyds Bank; 53.74622°N 1.60199°W		1891	The bank, which is in Italianate style, is on a corner site. It is in stone with some brick, and has an eaves band, a cornice, a blocking course, and a roof of Welsh blue slate. There are three storeys, three bays to the right, four to the left, and an angled bay on the corner. The round-arched doorway on the corner has fluted Doric pilasters, imposts, a keystone, fluted brackets, an entablature, and an open triangular pediment. At the top of the bay is a pedimented festooned date plaque. In the ground floor are pilasters and a cornice, the windows in the upper floors have architraves, and those in the middle floor have alternating triangular and segmental pediments.	II
Town Hall; 53.74589°N 1.60200°W		1892–95	The town hall is in sandstone, the basement rusticated, with balustraded parapets and a lead roof. There are two storeys and a basement, a symmetrical front of 13 bays, with giant Composite columns between the bays, and 14 bays on the sides with Composite pilasters. On the front, the middle three bays are wider and project to form a portico with a full entablature and a moulded pediment containing sculpture in the tympanum. Steps lead up to the doorway that has wrought iron gates, above which is a Venetian window. The ground floor windows have flat heads, in the upper floor they have arched heads, keystones and an impost band, and between the floors are rosettes. On the roof is a three-stage tower with a rusticated base, and a bell stage with round-arched openings and balconies, above which is a balustraded parapet with urns and domed pinnacles. The top stage contains clock faces, pediments, and a dome surmounted by a smaller dome on a drum.	I
Abbey House Veterinary Clinic; 53.74294°N 1.60048°W		1895	Originally a temperance hall, later used for other purposes, it is in stone with moulded gutter brackets and a roof of blue Welsh slate. There are two storeys and a symmetrical front of five bays, the middle three bays projecting, and flanked by angle pilasters rising to fluted pilasters with Corinthian capitals. In the centre is a semicircular-arched doorway with a moulded surround, a keystone and a hood mould ending in small columns and carved spandrels. Above is a sill band and a large Venetian window with keystones, and an open pedimented gable with an oculus in the tympanum, surmounted by an urn finial. In the outer bays are windows and panels, in the upper floor with rosettes, and above are dentilled cornices and finials. The right return has seven bays, and it contains a doorway with a triangular pediment, round-arched windows in the upper floor and flat-headed windows in the ground floor.	II
Barclays Bank; 53.74590°N 1.60137°W		1899	A shop on a corner site, later a bank, in stone, the ground floor tiled, with a mansard roof in Welsh blue slate and lead. There are three storeys, five bays on Queen Street, seven on Albion Street, and a curved bay on the corner rising to an octagonal turret with an onion-shaped dome. Between the bays are pilasters with carved capitals. In the middle floor is a balustrade, a dentilled cornice and segmental-arched windows, the windows in the top floor are mullioned and transomed, and in the roof is a continuous dormer. In Albion Street is a round-arched doorway with pilasters, a keystone, an entablature on brackets, and a swan-neck pediment with festoons in the tympanum, above which is a pavilion roof with cresting.	II
St Mary's in the Wood Church Hall; 53.74691°N 1.60060°W		1900	A Sunday school, later used for other purposes, it is in stone on a plinth, with quoin pilasters, a moulded band, a cornice, a deep entablature, an eaves cornice, and a Welsh blue slate roof. There are two storeys, a symmetrical front of seven bays, and nine bays along the sides. Steps with balustrades lead up to the middle three bays, which have engaged columns with Composite capitals, and are surmounted by a segmental pediment with a moulded cornice. In the ground floor are two doorways with fanlights, and a small window, and in the upper floor are tall arched windows with chamfered surrounds. In the outer bays, the ground floor contains rectangular windows, and in the upper floor are arched windows with an impost band.	II
Public library 53.74672°N 1.60123°W		1905–06	The library is in stone, with a bracketed cornice, a balustraded parapet, and a Welsh blue slate roof. There are two storeys, a symmetrical front of six bays, with a first-floor entablature and dentilled cornice, and a single-storey rear range. The outer bays project; in the ground floor are tripartite windows, and the upper floor has quoin pilasters and contains a window with an architrave, a triple keystone and a segmental pediment, above which is an open triangular pediment. In the centre is a portal with Ionic pilasters and columns, an entablature, a segmental pediment, and a doorway with an architrave, a frieze and a triple keystone, and in the tympanum is a cartouche, This is flanked by single-light windows with keystones, and in the upper floor the windows are divided by Ionic pilasters.	II
War memorial 53.74772°N 1.60337°W		1927	The war memorial is in Scatcherd Park, and consists of a bronze statue of a woman standing and holding a trident in one hand and a winged man kneeling in the other. This is on a circular base with four lions' heads, on a tapering granite plinth with shafted pilasters. On the front of the plinth is an inscription.	II
Former coach house, Rods Mill Lane; 53.74249°N 1.59679°W	—	Undated	The former coach house is in stone with quoins, moulded gutter brackets, and a hipped stone slate roof. On the front is a cart entry with a basket arch, and an arched window above. The left return has four bays, and contains lunettes in the ground floor, two lowered to form arched windows, and in the upper floor are circular windows.	II
