= North of England Council for Promoting the Higher Education of Women =

Society promoting degrees for women

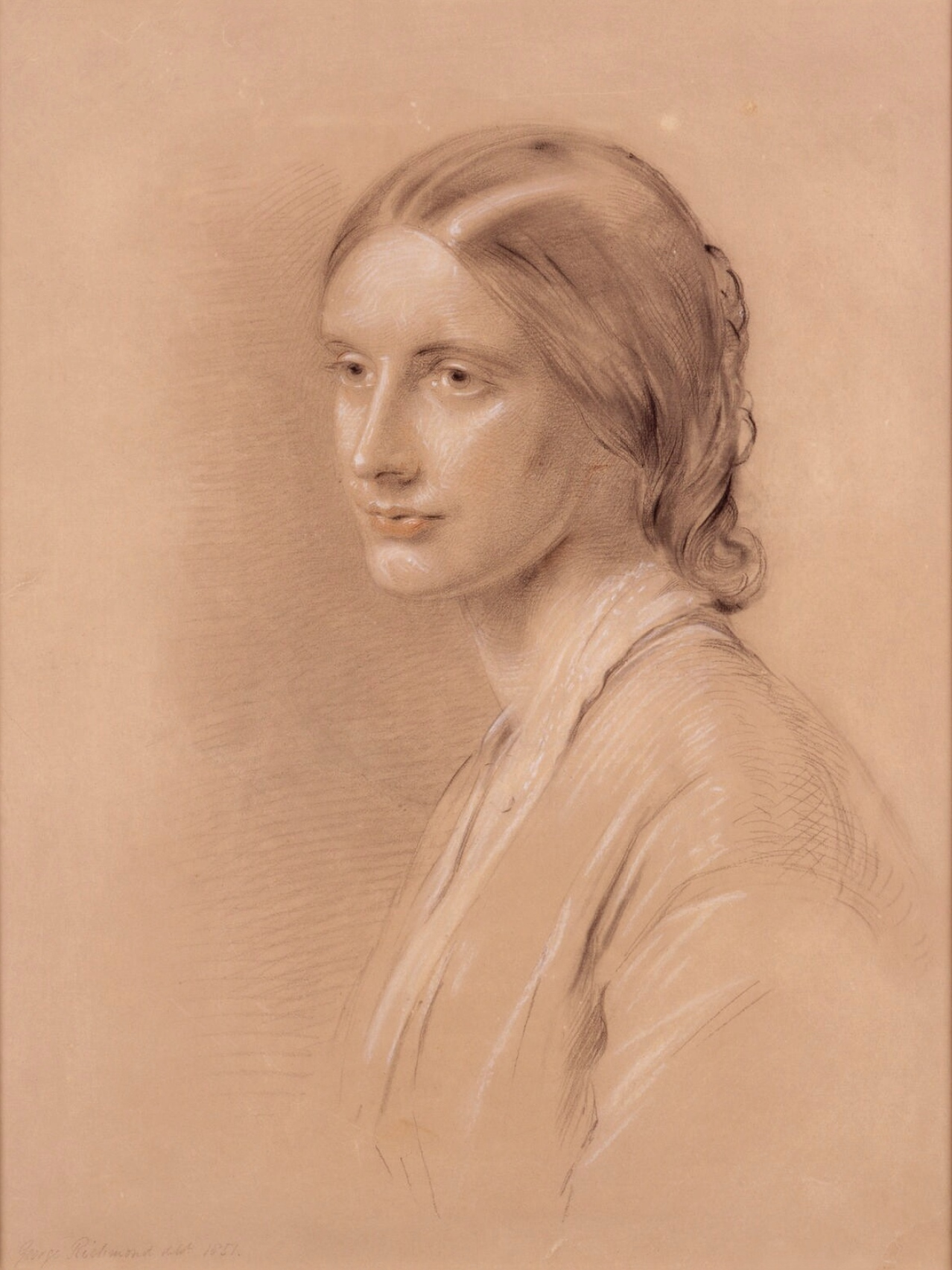
Josephine Butler, founding president of NECPHEW

The North of England Council for Promoting the Higher Education of Women (NECPHEW), inspired by Anne Clough, was established in November 1867. At this time women could not be awarded university degrees even though they had passed the examinations. The University of London awarded its first degrees to women in 1878, Durham followed in 1895 but Oxford did not follow suit until 1920 and Cambridge not until 1948.

At its first meeting, Ladies' Educational Associations were represented by Elizabeth Wolstenholme from Manchester and Lucy Wilson from Leeds. Clough became honorary secretary and Josephine Butler took office as its president, a position she held until she stood down in 1871. Wolstenholme drew up the rules and her friend, the academic James Stuart gave a series of lectures for women in astronomy. F W H Myers was another tutor and more than 550 students signed up to his university lectures.

During winter 1867 and spring 1868, members of NECPHEW gathered support for a memorial to the Cambridge Senate. In October 1868 the professional accreditation of women educators was secured by the award of a University Diploma. The second meeting of NECPHEW was held at Leeds on 15 and 16 April 1868.

By 1872, Manchester Ladies' Educational Association was represented by Elizabeth Gaskell's daughter Meta and the Ladies' Educational Association in Leeds by Frances Lupton who was supported by her sister-in-law, Anna Lupton and Lord Houghton. A number of the council's members also belonged to the Education for Girls Committee of the Royal Society of Arts which, from 1871, had aligned itself with the aims of NECPHEW.

== Publications ==
- North of England Council for Promoting the Education of Women — Spottiswoode & Company, 1868 - Women - 11 pages

== See also ==
- Timeline of women's education
