= William Henry Wilkins =

Political writer and novelist

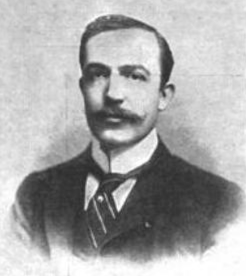
- In The Sketch, 14 October 1896
- Born: 23 December 1860; Compton Martin, Somerset, England
- Died: 22 December 1905 (aged 44); Mayfair, London, England
- Education: Clare College, Cambridge
- Occupation: Writer
- Political party: Conservative

William Henry Wilkins (1860–1905) was an English writer, best known as a royal biographer and campaigner for immigration controls. He used the pseudonym W. H. de Winton.

== Life ==
Born at Compton Martin, Somerset, on 23 December 1860, he was son of Charles Wilkins, farmer, of Gurney Court, Somerset, and later of Mann's farm, Mortimer, Berkshire, where Wilkins passed much of his youth. His mother was Mary Ann Keel. After private education, he was employed in a bank at Brighton. Entering Clare College, Cambridge in 1884, he graduated B.A. in 1887, and proceeded M.A. in 1899.

Initially considering holy orders, at the university Wilkins developed literary tastes and interested himself in politics. A Conservative, he spoke frequently at the Cambridge Union, of which he was vice-president in 1886.

After leaving Cambridge, Wilkins acted for a time as private secretary to the Earl of Dunraven. In 1891 Dunraven and Arnold White set up the Association for Preventing the Immigration of Destitute Aliens (APIDA), and Wilkins acted as its secretary. White and Dunraven had been active against immigration from at least 1886, and had hoped for parliamentary action. There was an "anti-alien" campaign by the London Evening News, and support from local MPs, and clergy including George Sale Reaney in Stepney. There lacked any serious local support in the parts of east London most affected, and the public at large was indifferent. APIDA ceased to function in 1892.

Wilkins then made a literary career in London. He died unmarried on 22 December 1905 at 3 Queen Street, Mayfair, London, and was buried in Kensal Green cemetery.

== Works ==
=== Social questions ===
In 1890 Wilkins wrote in the National Review that British workmen should be protected from "hordes of destitute Jews". In 1891 he wrote about the immigration issue in the US, in The Nineteenth Century. He also did some field work in the East End of London, observing hiring practices for recent immigrants in Goulston Street (Aldgate, covered by the Whitechapel area). Proposals of the Earl of Dunraven for restricting immigration were written up by Wilkins in The Alien Invasion (1892), with introduction by Robert Billing, in the "Social Questions of Today" series by Methuen & Co. The recommendations in the book bore some relation to later measures in the Aliens Act 1905.

Wilkins argued against the admittance of Southern Europeans and Ashkenazi Jews. He also took up the issue of sweated labour, finding contemporary caricatures of Jewish exploiters apt. The contribution of The Alien Invasion to the immigration debate of the period, with the warnings Wilkins gave of the impact on British working class opinion, the spread of nationalities in view, and the appeal to rich British Jews to limit Jewish immigration in particular, is considered significant. Dunraven wrote an article "The invasion of destitute aliens" in The Nineteenth Century for June 1892.

That year the Trades Union Congress had come down in favour of restricting Jewish immigration, and the book listed labour organisations favouring immigration controls. An earlier work was The Traffic in Italian Children, and Wilkins contributed a paper "The Italian Aspect" to Arnold White's The Destitute Alien in Great Britain (1892). In 1893 Wilkins wrote a pamphlet for the Women's Emancipation Union on sweated labour in the garment trade, particularly in the East End of London.

=== Novelist ===
In 1892, Wilkins edited, with Hubert Crackanthorpe whom he knew from Cambridge, a short-lived monthly periodical, The Albemarle (9 nos.). He published four novels (two in collaboration) under the pseudonym of De Winton. St. Michael's Eve (1892, 2nd edition 1894) was a seriously intended society novel. Then followed The Forbidden Sacrifice (1893), set partly in Germany, partly in East London, John Ellicombe's Temptation (1894, with the Hon. Julia Chetwynd), and The Holy Estate: a study in morals (with Captain Francis Alexander Thatcher). With another Cambridge friend, Herbert Vivian, he wrote under his own name The Green Bay Tree (1894), which satirised the Cambridge and political life of the time and went through five editions.

=== The Burtons and their papers ===
Wilkins came to know Isabel Burton, and after her death wrote The Romance of Isabel, Lady Burton (1897), a sympathetic memoir based mainly on her letters and autobiography. Wilkins also edited in 1898, by Lady Burton's direction, a revised and abbreviated version of her Life of Sir Richard Burton, and her The Passion Play at Ober-Ammergau (1900), as well as Richard Burton's unpublished The Jew, the Gypsy, and El Islam (with preface and notes, containing part of an antisemitic manuscript left by Burton) (1898), and Wanderings in Three Continents (1901). The version of The Jew, the Gypsy, and El Islam brought Wilkins into discussion with the Board of Deputies of British Jews on what should be published of Burton's research on blood libels. Burton's appendix on the Damascus affair of 1840 was omitted.

=== Biographer ===
At Lund University in Sweden Wilkins discovered in 1897 the unpublished correspondence between Sophia Dorothea of Celle, the consort of George I, and her lover, Count Philip Christopher Königsmarck. This research, backed up from the archives of Hanover and elsewhere, led to The Love of an Uncrowned Queen, Queen Sophie Dorothea, Consort of George I, which appeared in 2 vols. in 1900 (revised edit. 1903). His Caroline the Illustrious, Queen Consort of George II (2 vols. 1901; new edit. 1904), had less claim to originality. A Queen of Tears (2 vols. 1904), a biography of Caroline Matilda of Great Britain, Queen of Denmark and sister of George III of Great Britain, used research at Copenhagen and superseded the previous biography by Frederic Charles Lascelles Wraxall. For his last work, Mrs. Fitzherbert and George IV (1905, 2 vols.), Wilkins had access, by Edward VII's permission, for the first time to the Fitzherbert papers at Windsor Castle, besides papers belonging to Maria Fitzherbert's family. Wilkins argued for the marriage with George IV.

In 1901 Wilkins edited South Africa a Century ago, letters of Lady Anne Barnard written 1797–1801 at the Cape of Good Hope. Wilkins also published Our King and Queen, the Story of their Life, (1903, 2 vols.), a popular illustrated book on Edward VII and Queen Alexandra, and he wrote occasionally for periodicals.

== Notes ==
Attribution

This article incorporates text from a publication now in the public domain: Lee, Sidney, ed. (1912). "Wilkins, William Henry". Dictionary of National Biography (2nd supplement). Vol. 3. London: Smith, Elder & Co.
