= Restitution of conjugal rights =

Action in English ecclesiastical courts

In English law, restitution of conjugal rights was an action in the ecclesiastical courts and later in the Court for Divorce and Matrimonial Causes. It was one of the actions relating to marriage, over which the ecclesiastical courts formerly had jurisdiction.

This could be brought against a husband or wife who was guilty of "subtraction"; that is, living away from their spouse without a good reason. If the suit was successful, the married couple would be required to live together again.

In 1969 a Law Commission report recommended the abolition of the action, and it was abolished by the Matrimonial Proceedings and Property Act 1970.

== History ==
=== United Kingdom ===
==== English Law ====
===== Prior to 1813 =====
Under the jurisdiction of the Ecclesiastical Courts, which controlled marriage regulations, desertion was not defined as a matrimonial offense, instead a deserted spouse could ask for a decree of restitution of conjugal rights. After such a decree was obtained, the other spouse had to return home and continue marital cohabitation - failure to do so was punished with excommunication.

===== The Ecclesiastical Courts Act 1813 =====
The Ecclesiastical Courts Act 1813 abolished the excommunication punishment, replacing it with imprisonment of up to six months.

===== The Matrimonial Causes Act 1884 =====
Under the Matrimonial Causes Act 1884, failure to comply with an order of restitution of conjugal rights was no longer punishable by imprisonment, and only served to establish desertion ("statutory desertion") which gave the other spouse the right to an immediate decree of judicial separation, and, if coupled with the husband's adultery, allowed the wife to obtain an immediate divorce.

===== The Matrimonial Causes Act 1923 =====
The Matrimonial Causes Act 1923 equalized the grounds for divorce of husband and wife, giving the wife the right to divorce her husband on the ground of adultery alone (previously only a husband had such a divorce right), so that asking for an order of restitution of conjugal rights was no longer as needed for wives.

===== Supreme Court of Judicature (Consolidation) Act 1925 =====
The Supreme Court of Judicature (Consolidation) Act 1925 repealed the Matrimonial Causes Act 1884. Failure to comply with an order of restitution of conjugal rights continued to be a ground for judicial separation, but would no longer be considered, on itself, desertion. In addition, failure to comply with a decree of restitution of conjugal rights also allowed a court to make provisions regarding finances, alimony, property, and custody of children.

===== The Matrimonial Proceedings and Property Act 1970 (abolition) =====
The Matrimonial Proceedings and Property Act 1970 abolished the action of restitution of conjugal rights. By that time, the action was seen as outdated and was rarely used.

==== Scotland ====
In Scotland, the legal action for "adherence" - the Scottish equivalent for restitution of conjugal rights - was abolished by Section 2(1) of the Law Reform (Husband and Wife) (Scotland) Act 1984.

=== Ireland ===
The legal action for restitution of conjugal rights was abolished in Ireland by the Family Law Act 1988.

=== Australia ===
In Australia the legal action for restitution of conjugal rights was abolished by the Family Law Act 1975 (Cth) s 8(2). Therefore, since 1975 courts no longer have the power to make a "decree of restitution of conjugal rights" to enforce marital duties. One problematic provision today is considered to be Section 114(2) of the Family Law Act 1975, which remains on the books, and provides that a court can "make an order relieving a party to a marriage from any obligation to perform marital services or render conjugal rights". Although this section is now obsolete (its last recorded use was in 1978; and the 1991 High Court of Australia case of R v L (1991) 174 CLR 379, 398 criminalized marital rape (ruling that, if the common law exemption was ever part of Australian law, it no longer was by 1991), the existence of such wording in the Family Law Act 1975 is argued to send problematic messages to the public; and in a 2010 report the Australian Law Reform Commission strongly recommended its abolition, writing that "Section 114(2) implies that there is a continuing obligation to render conjugal rights and provide marital services—obligations that no longer exist in law and which should not be assumed to form part of a marriage as a social or legal institution" and "The Commissions therefore consider that the power to make an order relieving a party to a marriage from any obligation to perform marital services or render conjugal rights is unnecessary and inconsistent with current principles of family and criminal law, and, as such, should be repealed." (see section on Injunctions to relieve a party to a marriage from rendering conjugal rights). Despite this, this provision still remains on the books.

=== South Africa ===
In South Africa, the legal action for restitution of conjugal rights was abolished by the Divorce Act, 1979 (Act No. 70 of 1979), Section 14.

=== Canada ===
In Canada, family law has varied significantly (and still varies today) by province/territory. Canadian family regulations have traditionally been based on concepts existing in English common law (except in Quebec, where the principal source of inspiration has been French law). As such, restitution of conjugal rights has been a part of law in most, but not all, provinces.

In Canada, it was only in the second part of the 20th century that a standardization of family law has been started. For example, until 1968, there was no uniform federal divorce law in Canada. Although the Divorce Act (Canada) is a federal Act that governs divorce in Canada, applying to all the country, many other issues regarding family law are left to province/territory. The legal action of restitution of conjugal rights was abolished in British Columbia by the Family Relations Act, R.S.B.C. 1979, c. 121, s. 75; in Manitoba by the Equality of Status Act, R.S.M. 1987, c. E140, s. l(2); in Newfoundland and Labrador by the Family Law Act, S. Nfld. 1988, c. 60, s. 76.3, as amended by S. Nfld. 1989, c. 11, s. 2. Not all provinces in Canada had adopted this concept; according to a 1993 report by the Alberta Law Reform Institute, the concept of restitution of conjugal rights has never been a true part of the law of Ontario, which is Canada's most populous province: the report stated that "In Ontario, actions for restitution of conjugal rights have never been entertained". While in many Canadian provinces the family law has been overhauled and modernized in the 1970s and 1980s, in others, such as Alberta, this only happened in the 21st century: the legal action of restitution of conjugal rights was abolished by the Family Law Act (Alberta) which came into force in 2005 (see section 103). The concept of restitution of conjugal rights has never been as harsh in Alberta as it has been in England; indeed, according to the 1993 report, unlike in England, "Neither excommunication nor imprisonment has applied in Alberta"; in fact by 1993, the refusal of a spouse to comply with a decree of restitution of conjugal rights only served as giving the other spouse a ground for judicial separation. In Saskatchewan, the concept of restitution of conjugal rights was effectively abolished by the Family Maintenance Act, SS 1990–91, c F-6.1, through its repeal of the section on restitution of conjugal rights relating to judicial separation (which was defined in the Queen's Bench Act). In Nova Scotia, the 2012 Matrimonial Statutes Repeal Act ("An Act to Repeal Out-dated Matrimonial Statutes") repealed six pieces of legislation related to family law, which were considered obsolete, including the Alimony Act, which made reference to restitution of conjugal rights. Also in New Brunswick, the 2008 "Act to Repeal the Divorce Court Act" repealed legislation which made reference to restitution of conjugal rights.

Although family law in Canada varies by province/territory, the criminal law of Canada is under the exclusive legislative jurisdiction of the federal government and is the same throughout Canada. Under the criminal law, marital rape was made illegal in 1983.

== Current situation in former British colonies and Commonwealth nations ==
English law was imported to many parts of the world through colonization, and so was the concept of restitution of conjugal rights, which continues to exist in law, in various forms, in some former British possessions, including India. In India, the concept has been subject to controversy, and was called by Khardekar (MP), at the time of the drafting of the Hindu Marriage Act, 1955 (which contains it), "uncouth, barbarous and vulgar". In 1984, the Supreme Court of India upheld the constitutionality of the restitution of conjugal rights, in Saroj Rani v Sudarshan Kumar Chadha (which found that the action of restitution of conjugal rights does not violate Article 14 or Article 21 of the Constitution, and is therefore a valid action). Human Rights Watch has criticized this concept as being a cause of violence and discrimination against women. Recently this law was challenged again in the Supreme Court post the Right to Privacy verdict by Ojaswa Pathak and Mayank Gupta, two students of Gujarat National Law University. YGL of the World Economic Forum Dr Fernandes explained how RCR directly violates Article 21 of the Indian Constitution and called for collegium vigilance of RCR Judgements.

== See also ==
- Coverture
- Marital power
- Marital rape
