= Thomas Stanton (settler) =

- Born: 1616? England
- Died: December 2, 1677; Stonington, Connecticut
- Known for: Co-founder, Stonington, Connecticut
- Spouse: Anna Lord (c.1637) (1614-1688)
- Children: Thomas Stanton Jr. (1638-1718); Capt. John Stanton (1641-1713); Mary Stanton (1643-?); Hannah Lord Stanton (1644-1727); Joseph Stanton (1646-1713); Daniel Stanton (1648-1688); Dorothy Stanton (1651-1743); Robert Stanton (1653-1724); Sarah Stanton (1655-1713); Samuel Stanton (1657-1698)

Thomas Stanton (1616?–1677) was a trader and an accomplished interpreter and negotiator with Native Americans in the Connecticut Colony, one of the original settlers of Hartford. He was also one of four founders of Stonington, Connecticut, along with William Chesebrough, Thomas Miner, and Walter Palmer.

He first appears in the historical record as an interpreter for John Winthrop Jr. in 1636. He fought in the Pequot War, nearly losing his life in the Fairfield Swamp Fight in 1637. In 1638, he was a delegate at the Treaty of Hartford which ended that war. In 1643, the United Colonies of New England appointed him as Indian Interpreter.

Following the war, Stanton returned to Hartford where he married and became a successful trader. In 1649, he settled a tract of land alongside the Pawcatuck River in present-day Stonington. In 1649 or 1650, he was given permission to establish a trading post on the river and was granted a three-year monopoly over Indian trade in the area. The trading house was built in 1651. During this time, Stanton's family remained in Hartford or New London, joining him in Stonington in about 1657 after the trading venture had become established and a suitable house constructed.

Stanton's first house in Stonington was demolished in the 19th century and today the site is marked by a large inscribed stone. A subsequent dwelling built beginning about 1670 is the oldest house still standing in Stonington and is now preserved as the Stanton-Davis Homestead Museum.

Stanton and his wife Anna are buried in Stonington at the Wequetequock Cemetery.

== Notable descendants ==
- Henry Brewster Stanton
- Harriot Eaton Stanton Blatch
- Lewis E. Stanton
- Theodore Stanton
- Nora Stanton Barney
