= Tobias Saunders =

Tobias Saunders (c. 1620 – 1695) was a British American legislator and a founding settler of Westerly, Rhode Island. He served as Deputy to the Rhode Island General Assembly (1669, 1671, 1672, 1680, 1681, 1683, and 1690), and a Conservator of the Peace (1669, 1678, and 1695).

== Early life ==
Tobias Saunders was probably born between 1620 and 1625, if he was old enough to travel from England to New England and appear on military rolls in Massachusetts by 1643. While he has been described as the second son and fourth child of Tobias Saunders and Isabel(la) Wilde of the town of Amersham, Buckinghamshire, England, this is virtually impossible based on records uncovered while researching the two "Richard Saunders" families of Amersham; one armigerous and one not. His early childhood is uncertain.

=== Early years in Colonial America ===
Saunders first appears in the Plymouth Colony on the Company Rolls of Taunton in August, 1643. These rolls contain the names of all male persons between sixteen and sixty years, who were able to perform military duty. Between 1649–1650 Saunders lived in the home of Lawrence Turner, while working at the Saugus Ironworks in the Massachusetts Bay Colony. By 1654 Saunders and Turner were purchasing property in Newport, Rhode Island. Saunders was recorded as a Freeman in the town of Newport in 1655.

Saunders joined the Newport Seventh Day Baptist church, and the church members that lived at Westerly frequently held meetings in his home before the Westerly Congregation's meetinghouse was built.

Saunders married in 1661 to Mary Peckham, daughter of John Peckham and Mary Clarke (and niece of Rev. John Clarke). Together they had 8 children.

== Founding and settlement of Westerly, Rhode Island ==
With the permission of the colonial legislature, a group of Rhode Island speculators purchased a tract of land called "Misquamicut" from the Indian Chief, Sosoa (a.k.a. Ninigret), Chief Sachem of the Niantic Tribe. By 1661, Tobias Saunders had acquired a quarter of a share in a division of Misquamicut (the area which now encompasses the towns of Westerly, Charlestown, Richmond and Hopkinton in Rhode Island).

The consequence of this situation was claim and counterclaim over the disputed territory. Usually this was a battle of words, but occasionally adversaries used physical force. William Chesebrough, a sixty-six-year-old resident of Southertowne, testified that "about thirty six inhabitants of Road Island" were laying out lots within Southerntowne boundaries on the east side of the Pawcatuck River. When he confronted them, Benedict Arnold and others answered that "they would not try their title anywhere but in Road Island, or in England." Angry Massachusetts Bay Colony authorities ordered the constable of Southertowne to "apprehend all such persons" and to bring them before the colony's magistrates. Walter Palmer arrested Tobias Saunders, Robert Burdick, and Joseph Clarke and conveyed Saunders and Burdick to Boston. Placed on trial before Governor John Endicott and associates on November 14, 1661. In response to charges of "forcible entry and intrusion into the bounds of Southerntowne," Saunders and Burdick contended that with the approval of the Rhode Island General Court they had purchased land from Indians and lawfully had begun constructing homes and farms. Their arguments were ineffective, and they remained in jail for a year until a fine of 40 pounds each was paid and 100 pounds each was raised as security." Roger Williams raised the funds for Saunders and Burdick's release.

In 1669, Rhode Island created a town on the eastern side of the Pawcatuck River. The place called Misquamicut became the town of Westerly, and Tobias Saunders and others were now townsmen as well as freemen. Connecticut continued to argue that the Narragansett River was their eastern boundary and that the river and the bay were the same. Rhode Island, unwilling to relinquish its southwestern territory, referred its adversaries to the 1644 patent, the 1664 charter, and the royal commissioners' determination of the King's Province, all of which set the Pawcatuck River as the Boundary. The problem as the Connecticut agents (Fitz-John Winthrop, was one of the three) well knew, was that their charter confused the Narragansett River with the Narragansett Bay. Although Governor Winthrop in his agreement with Clarke had acknowledged that "Pawcatuck" and "Narragansett" described the same river, they refused to deflate their territorial ambitions. Profitable lobbying by the Atherton Trading Company also strengthened their resolve. The conference dissolved with matters worse than before. On 18 July 1669, Tobias Saunders and John Crandall wrote a letter to Thomas Stanton and Thomas Minor, both of Stonington, concerning their examination of Chief Ninigret regarding a rumored Indian plot.

By 17 June 1670, both sides in their frustration opted for force. The Connecticut commissioners ordered the residents of Westerly to "submit to the government" of Connecticut, and they authorized the constable of Stonington, John Frink, to gather the Rhode Islanders to hear the declaration. The Westerly citizens did not appear. Instead, Tobias Saunders empowered James Babcock as a constable to arrest "those claiming authority over them". Babcock apprehended Frink and two other Stonington residents. Almost immediately Babcock and Saunders were captured and brought before the Connecticut commissioners. The Connecticut agents had a deal. They offered Saunders a town office under Connecticut jurisdiction (he is listed as a Selectman of Stonington in 1677) but both he and Babcock had to post bail to appear before magistrates at New London the following June.

The Rhode Island General Assembly warned that Connecticut citizens who disrupted Rhode Island lives, would forfeit any land they owned east of the Pawcatuck River and would face additional prosecution. Residents of Westerly who professed loyalty to Connecticut would also lose their land. Westerly victims who incurred damage would be reimbursed from the sale of confiscated property. Connecticut's response was to apprehend one of Westerly's officers, John Crandall. When Rhode Island objected, Connecticut replied that people in the disputed territory were supposed to choose which government they wanted rather than having it imposed, and they complained that their citizens were the ones being molested. The Rhode Island General Assembly defiantly held their next session at Westerly. Just prior to the meeting, the constable, James Babcock, was requested to call all the local residents in. The much-abused Babcock, caught once again in an awkward position, refused. Nevertheless, twenty-two adult males attended the meeting and swore their fidelity to Rhode Island. Two of the four non-attendees, included James Babcock, reversed themselves the next day, and they too acknowledged the sovereignty of the King and the Rhode Island government. On 2 May 1673, Tobias Saunders wrote to John Winthrop Jr., Governor of Connecticut, "in the behalf of the rest", requesting that their outstanding fines from Connecticut be forgiven because "we are but a company of poor men". [Winthrop Family Papers, Massachusetts Historical Society, Boston.]

== King Philip's War ==
On 3 July 1675, Tobias Saunders wrote to Major John (Fitz John) Winthrop, on behalf of Chief Ninigret, concerning King Philip's mischief with Uncas. On 7 July 1675, Saunders wrote to Wait (Waitstill, brother of Fitz John) Winthrop concerning a meeting between Ninigret and Waitstill tomorrow "near Mr. Stanton's farm", but requesting that Uncas and his men not be invited to attend.

During the war, Saunders remained in Westerly acting as a liaison to Ninigret, and conveying information about the intentions of the various Indian tribes involved in King Philip's War to Major John Winthrop, Captain Wait Still Winthrop, and Fitz-John Winthrop. During this time, "Certain men among the English, because of their place of residence and their connections, specialized in dealing with one or another of these tribes. The minister at Norwich, Mr. James Fitch, usually maintained a close liaison with Uncas and the Mohegans. Thomas Stanton and the Reverend James Noyes of Stonington performed a similar function with the Pequots and the Niantics, while Tobias Saunders of Westerly also had some influence with Ninigret."

On 10 December 1675, Saunders and Thomas Stanton wrote to Governor Winthrop regarding their meeting that day with Chief Ninigret and his pledge to stand with the English against the Narragansett Indians if it came to war.

== See also ==
- List of early settlers of Rhode Island
- Colony of Rhode Island and Providence Plantations
