= Robert Burdick =

British America colonial official, legislator (1630–1692)

Deputy of the Rhode Island General Court
- In office 1680–1685

Personal details
- Born: November 2, 1630 Devonshire, England
- Died: October 25, 1692 (aged 61) Westerly, Rhode Island, British America (now the United States)
- Resting place: Burdick Ground, Westerly, Rhode Island, U.S.
- Spouse: Ruth Hubbard
- Relations: William Burdet (paternal ancestor); Nicholas St Lawrence (grandfather)
- Children: 9
- Occupation: Legislator deacon

Robert Burdick (November 2, 1630 – October 25, 1692), sometimes written as Robert Burdett, was a British American legislator and deacon for the Colony of Rhode Island and Providence Plantations. Burdick was one of the earliest settlers in what is now known as Westerly, Rhode Island. Burdick is best known for playing a leading role in a border dispute between Rhode Island and the Massachusetts Bay Colony over lands along the Pawcatuck River. In 1661 he was arrested and jailed by Massachusetts authorities in a test case over territorial rights that were enshrined in the Rhode Island Royal Charter. Burdick served several terms as a Deputy in the General Court of Rhode Island later in his career from 1680 to 1685.

== Early life ==
Robert Burdick was born on November 2, 1630, to parents Frances (née St. Lawrence) and Samuel Burdick in Devonshire, England. His maternal grandfather was Nicholas St Lawrence, 4th Baron Howth, meanwhile one of his paternal ancestors was William Burdet.

Burdick arrived in the Thirteen Colonies (now United States) around 1651. Burdick was baptized on November 19, 1652, by Joseph Torrey in Newport, Rhode Island. He was an early advocate for Sabbatarianism (later the Seventh Day Baptist church) in the Rhode Island colony. On March 22, 1661, Burdick was a signatory of a portion of the Misquamicut Purchase, a land cession treaty between colonists of the colony of Rhode Island and the Narragansett people.

== Boundary dispute and imprisonment ==
Territory between the Narragansett Bay and the Pawcatuck River near present-day Westerly, Rhode Island was a contested area between the Rhode Island and Massachusetts colonies in the mid-17th century. In 1661, Burdick and a group of 36 settlers led by Tobias Saunders and Joseph Clarke occupied lands in the Misquamicut region (extending west of present-day Pawcatuck, Rhode Island) under the authority of the Rhode Island colonial government. The Rhode Island Royal Charter dictated that the Pawcatuck River (at the time also referred to as the Narragansett River) served as the territorial boundary of the colony of Rhode Island. Many colonists interpreted the boundary of the Pawcatuck River, including the western bank, which quickly caused confusion amongst settlers.

The Massachusetts colony claimed the same territory as part of a settlement that was then known as Southertown (present-day Stonington, Connecticut) within the borders of the Connecticut Colony. In late 1661 Walter Palmer, a constable for the Massachusetts colony, arrested Burdick and Tobias Saunders for "forcible entry and intrusion" into Massachusetts territory and sent them to Boston to be tried by the Governor of the Massachusetts Bay Colony John Endecott.

On November 14, 1661, during the trial William Chesebrough and his three sons testified against Burdick, Saunders, and Clarke stating that the three of them "lay claim unto the lands on the east side of Pawcatuck, with[in] the bounds of Southerntowne, to divide and lay out lotts in the same". Burdick argued that he and the other men had acted with the "authority of the Lord Governour of the Massachusets" (that is, the Rhode Island colony). The Massachusetts court found the men guilty and fined them £100 each. The defendants were ordered to remain in the Boston Gaol until the fines were paid and security for future "good behaviour" was also provided by their families or friends.

Burdick and Saunders' imprisonment in Boston became a diplomatic incident between the colonies. The two men refused to pay the fines, arguing that to do so would be an implicit recognition of Massachusetts' jurisdiction over the disputed lands. They remained imprisoned for over a year, during which time Roger Williams petitioned for their release. The dispute was finally settled in Rhode Island's favor, establishing Rhode Island's southwestern border.

This would be the first official border dispute between the states of Rhode Island and Massachusetts, but not the last. Roughly 200 years later Massachusetts and Rhode Island fought over control of Narragansett Bay during the 1838 United States Supreme Court Case of Rhode Island v. Massachusetts. The same dispute returned to the Supreme Court in 1840 and 1841.

== Political career ==
The town on the west bank of the Pawcatuck River was incorporated as the town of Westerly in 1669, and Burdick rose to be a leader in the administration of the new town. On May 17, 1671, he was among the 79 or so adult male citizens of the town that signed an Oath of Allegiance to the King and the Colony of Rhode Island. This was a common legal formality at the time that sought to shore up political support for towns in the face of continuing challenges to the colonial boundaries from neighboring Connecticut.

Burdick was elected several times as a Deputy to the General Court of Rhode Island (the colonial legislature). His several terms of service included the years 1680, 1683, and 1685.

Westerly was forced to be temporarily abandoned during King Philip's War (1675–1678), as the conflict between colonial settlers and Native American tribes was in close proximity to the town. Burdick and his family, along with other residents, fled the settlement for Newport, Rhode Island, returning at the end of hostilities.

In approximately 1666, Burdick formed a Sabbatarian congregation in Westerly with Tobias Saunders and Joseph Clarke. This congregation was the precursor to the Hopkinton Seventh Day Baptist Church, Burdick would end up serving as the church's deacon.

== See also ==
- List of early settlers of Rhode Island
