= Quiambaug =

Area of Stonington, Connecticut, United States

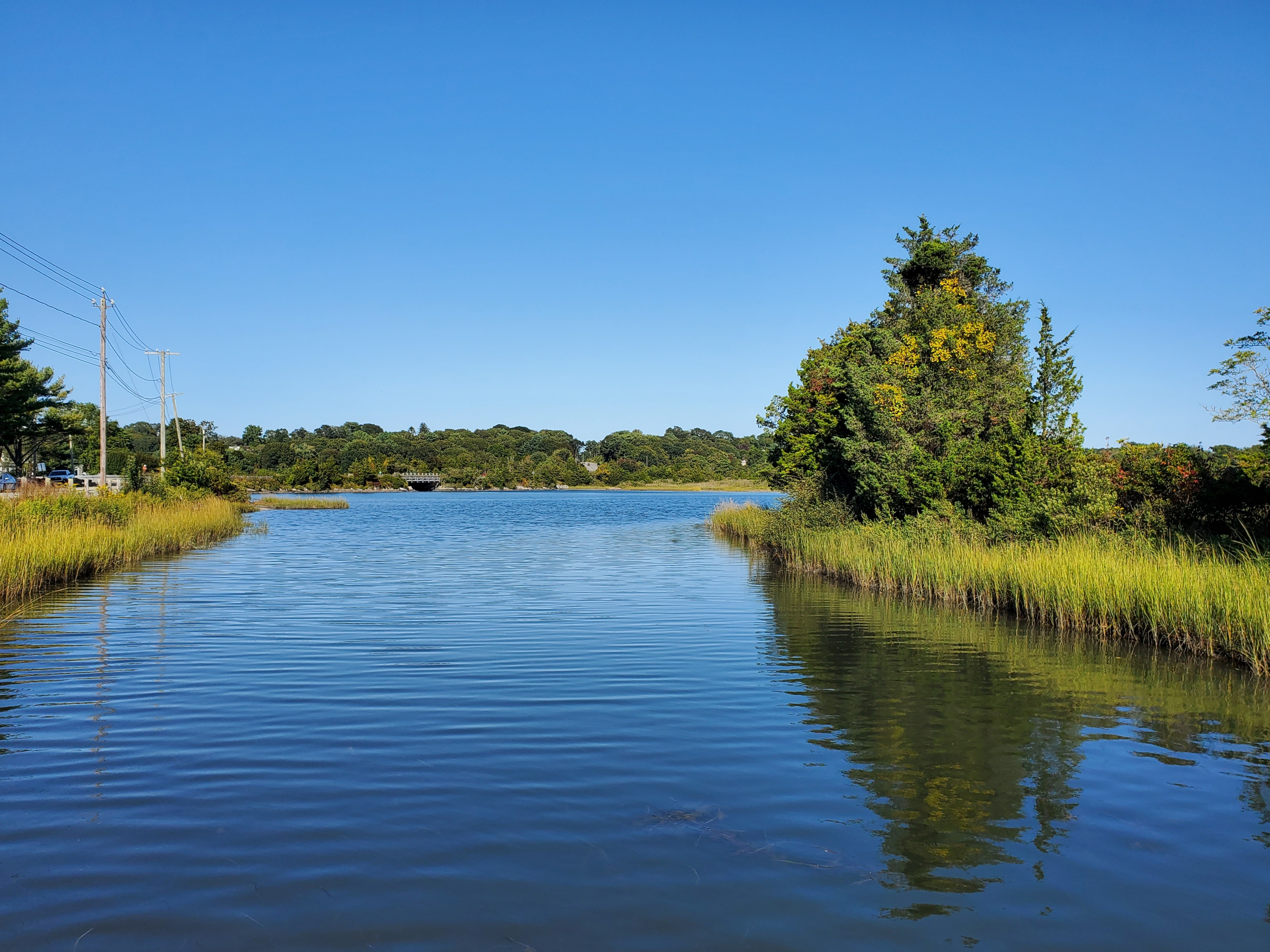
Quiambog Cove in 2024

Quiambaug is an area of Stonington, Connecticut, consisting primarily of the valley of the Mistuxet Brook and Quiambog Cove, and comprising roughly one-sixth of the town.

One of the first four settlers of Stonington, Thomas Miner, built his house in Quiambaug in 1653. His diary of life there in the 17th century. The entries for 1668 are available at http://historymatters.gmu.edu/d/6228An.

Quiambaug Cove was one of the largest producing area of commercial oysters in Connecticut in 1900.

Notable residents have included the sailor Nathaniel Fanning and explorer Edmund Fanning, FBI Director L. Patrick Gray, artist Ellery Thompson, and writer L. Rust Hills.

The Quiambaug valley includes the Quiambaug Fire District and the Quiambaug Volunteer Fire Department.
