= William Clark Company Thread Mill =

- U.S. National Register of Historic Places
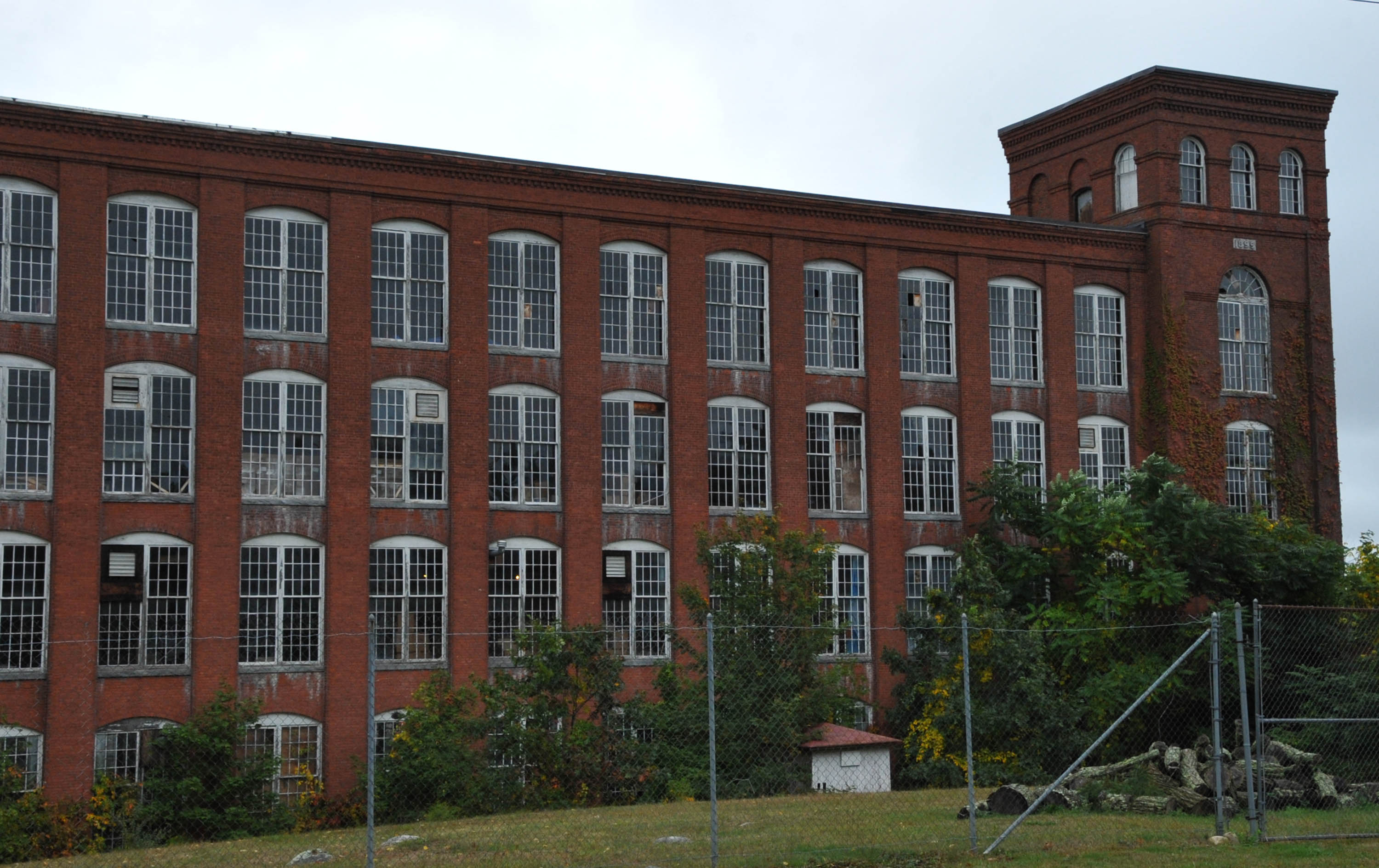

- Location within Connecticut Location within the United States
- Location: 21 Pawcatuck Avenue, 12 and 22 River Road, Stonington, Connecticut
- Coordinates: 41°21′45″N 71°50′26″W
- Area: 5.5 acres (2.2 ha)
- Built: 1892
- Architectural style: Romanesque
- NRHP reference No.: 08001190
- Added to NRHP: December 16, 2008

The William Clark Company Thread Mill is a historic textile mill complex at Pawcatuck Avenue and River Road in the Pawcatuck village of Stonington, Connecticut. Developed beginning in 1892, it is a well-preserved example of a late 19th-century mill, which was a major economic force in the region. The mill was listed on the National Register of Historic Places in 2008.

== Description and history ==
The William Clark Company Thread Mill is located south of the village center of Pawcatuck, overlooking the Pawcatuck River between Pawcatuck Avenue and River Road South of Clark Street. The mill is a complex of brick buildings, the largest of which is four stories in height, measuring 270 by 100 feet (82 m × 30 m). Windows are typically set in segmented-arch openings, and there is a corbelled brick cornice at the top. A square tower projects from the northeast corner; originally five stories in height, it is now slightly taller than the main building. The tower has large windows set in round-arch openings.

The company was founded in 1892 by William Clark, a leading manufacturer of cotton thread whose principal facilities were in Trenton, New Jersey. This plant, which was powered by steam, was probably built to broaden the company's manufacturing reach after a bitter and prolonged strike at the Trenton facility. The company was a major employer in the Pawcatuck-Westerly, Rhode Island region, and the plant, through ownership changes, operated into the 1950s. It was extensively damaged in the New England Hurricane of 1938, but significant elements were repaired or rebuilt.

== See also ==
- National Register of Historic Places listings in New London County, Connecticut
