= Lords Point, Connecticut =

Village in Connecticut, United States

Coordinates: 41.336°N 71.928°W

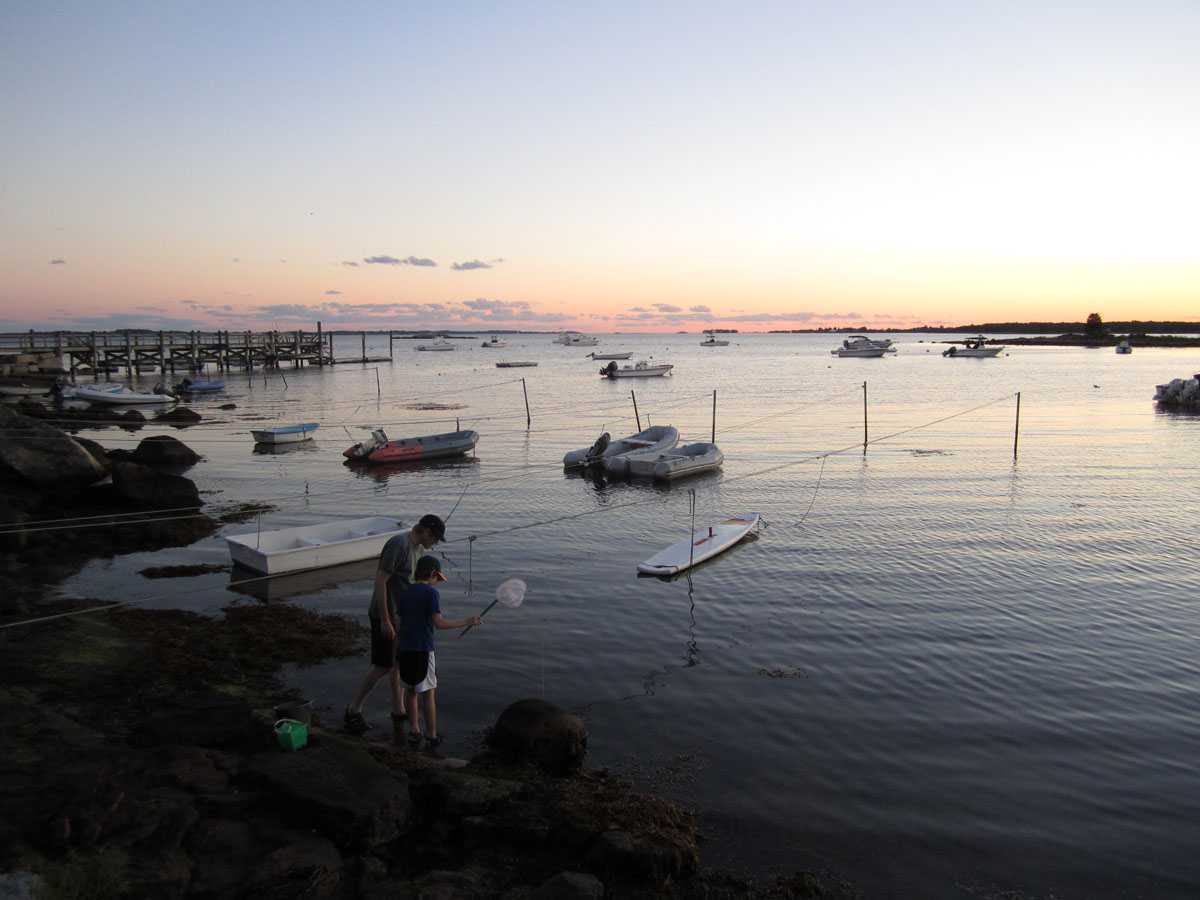
Catching crabs at Boulder Beach - Lords Point, 2013.

Lords Point is a small private village on the Atlantic Coast in the town of Stonington, Connecticut, United States, established in 1909. Lords Point has over 200 houses and summer cottages, with an average summer population of 800 people.

There are six beaches in Lords Point: Open Way, Tim's Beach, Boulder Beach, Hopkins Beach, Pebble Beach, and Trestle Beach. There are two docks: Boulder and Langworthy. These are limited to Lords Point residents and guests only.

Facilities at the Point include a basketball court, a bocce area, a tennis court, a soccer field, and a Community House which hosts various summer activities, including Bingo, teen parties, art programs, an annual talent show, and athletic classes.
