= Whitehall Mansion =

Historic house in Connecticut, United States

- U.S. National Register of Historic Places
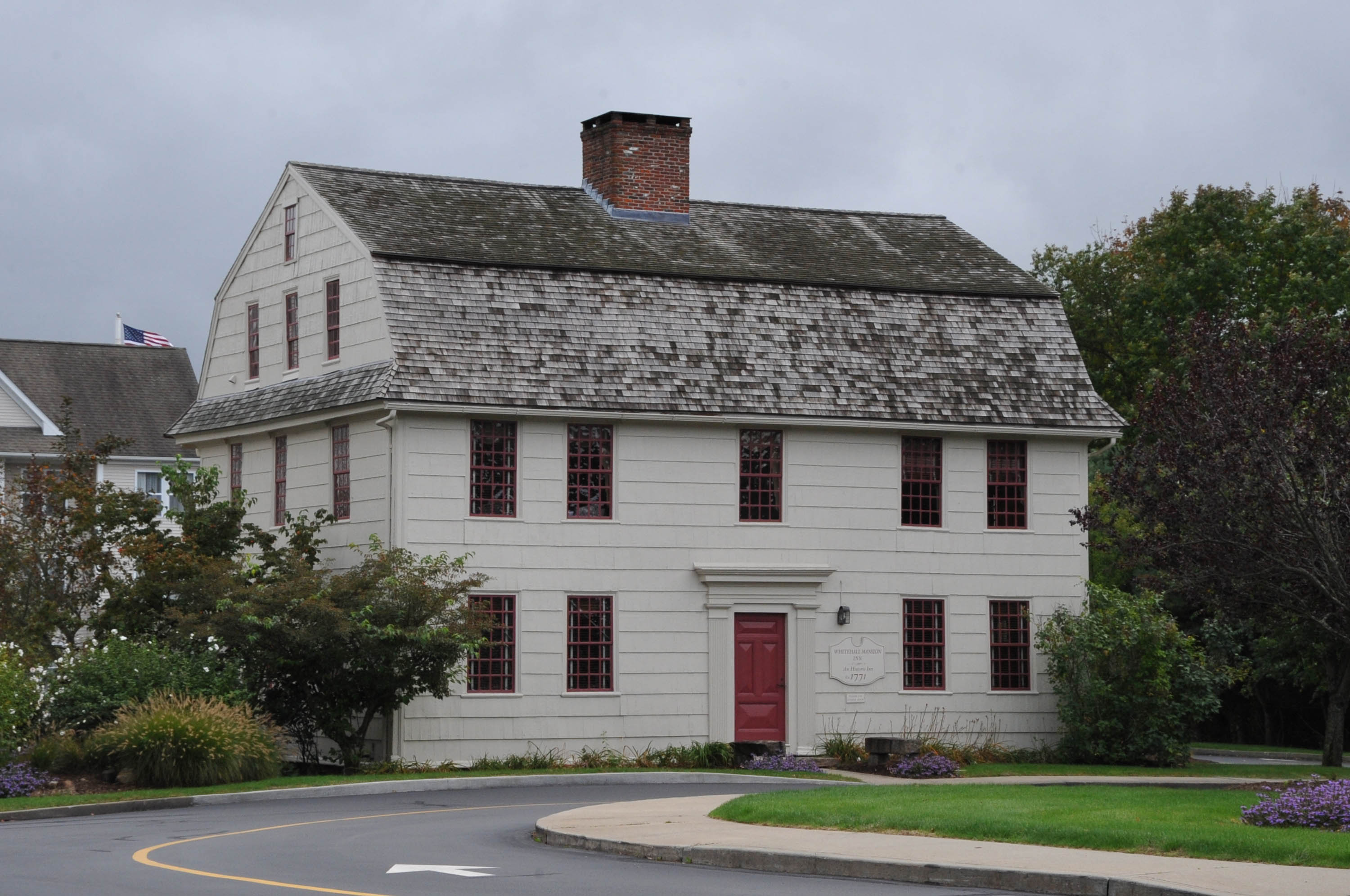

- Location within Connecticut Location within the United States
- Location: 42 Whitehall Avenue, Stonington, Connecticut
- Coordinates: 41°22′37″N 71°57′20″W
- Area: 3.5 acres (1.4 ha)
- Built: 1771
- Architectural style: Colonial
- NRHP reference No.: 79002647
- Added to NRHP: April 12, 1979

The Whitehall Mansion is a historic house at 42 Whitehall Avenue in the Stonington side of Mystic, Connecticut. Built about 1771 for a local physician and politician, it is a fine example of late Georgian architecture. It has been moved twice, both times short distances, and now serves as a bed and breakfast inn. The house was added to the National Register of Historic Places on April 12, 1979.

== Description and history ==
The Whitehall Mansion is located in a commercially built-up area in Mystic just north of Interstate 95, on the east side of Whitehall Avenue (Connecticut Route 27) in front of a modern hotel that has been built on the back of its property. It is a 2 1/2-story wood-frame structure, with a gambrel roof, large central chimney, and a shingled exterior. Its main facade faces west, and is five bays wide, with the center entrance framed by pilasters and a corniced entablature. Unusual features include the use of brick instead of stone on part of the chimney inside the house, and the use of brick as nogging (fill and insulation) in the walls. The interior follows a typical central chimney plan, with a narrow entrance vestibule that also houses a winding staircase, parlor chambers to either side of the chimney, and the kitchen extending across much of the rear. There are small chambers in the rear corners on either side of the kitchen. The floor plan of the second floor is similar.

The house was built in the 1770s by Dudley Woodbridge, a doctor in Mystic who also represented Groton in the state legislature. In 1962, the house was donated to the Stonington Historical Society, its original location threatened by the construction of nearby Interstate 95. The house was carefully moved to a new site just across the street.

In 1993, the Stonington Historical Society sought permission to relocate the house forward on its lot so that it would attract more attention. The Stonington Historical Society had decided that it could not afford to continue operating the house as a museum, but its location on the rear of the lot was seen as an obstacle to its sale. The request was approved on March 2, 1994. The house is now operated as a bed and breakfast inn.

== See also ==
- National Register of Historic Places listings in New London County, Connecticut
