= Mechanic Street Historic District =

Historic district in Connecticut, United States

- U.S. National Register of Historic Places
- U.S. Historic district
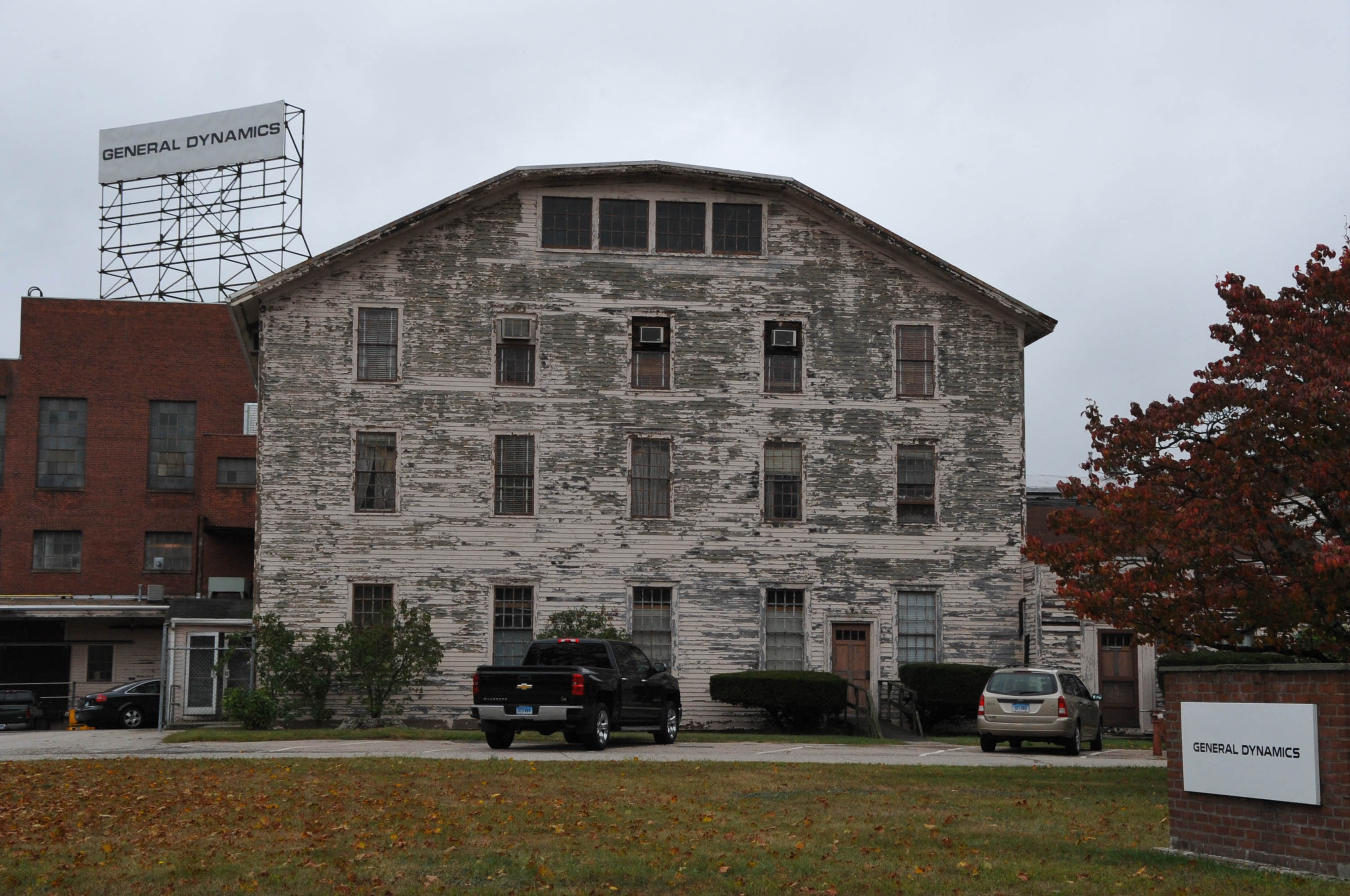

- Location within Connecticut Location within the United States
- Location: Roughly bounded by West Broad Street, Pawcatuck River, Cedar Street, and Courtland Street, Stonington, Connecticut
- Coordinates: 41°22′23″N 71°49′59″W
- Area: 147 acres (59 ha)
- Architect: Pendelton & Hall; Et al.
- Architectural style: Late 19th and 20th Century Revivals, Greek Revival, Late Victorian
- NRHP reference No.: 88000653
- Added to NRHP: June 7, 1988

The Mechanic Street Historic District encompasses a historic 19th-century mill and mill village in a 14-block area of the Pawcatuck section of Stonington, Connecticut. Extending along the Pawcatuck River and south of West Broad Street (United States Route 1), the area includes a large brick mill complex on the banks of the river, and a neighborhood of well-preserved worker housing on the road grid to its west. The district was listed on the National Register of Historic Places in 1988.

== Description and history ==
The Pawcatuck area of Stonington developed, along with adjacent Westerly, Rhode Island, as a port and shipbuilding center in the early 19th century. Several shipyards lined the western (Stonington) bank of the river, whose worker housing formed the early construction of worker housing on the residential grid to the west. The arrival of the railroad in 1837 led the area to also develop an industrial base, with a foundry established in 1851 and a machine factory in 1857. This plant eventually specialized in the manufacture of printing presses, and was joined later in the 19th century by a textile mill. Worker housing of all types was built nearby, both by the business owners and other parties, to meet the housing demand for the workers employed in these businesses.

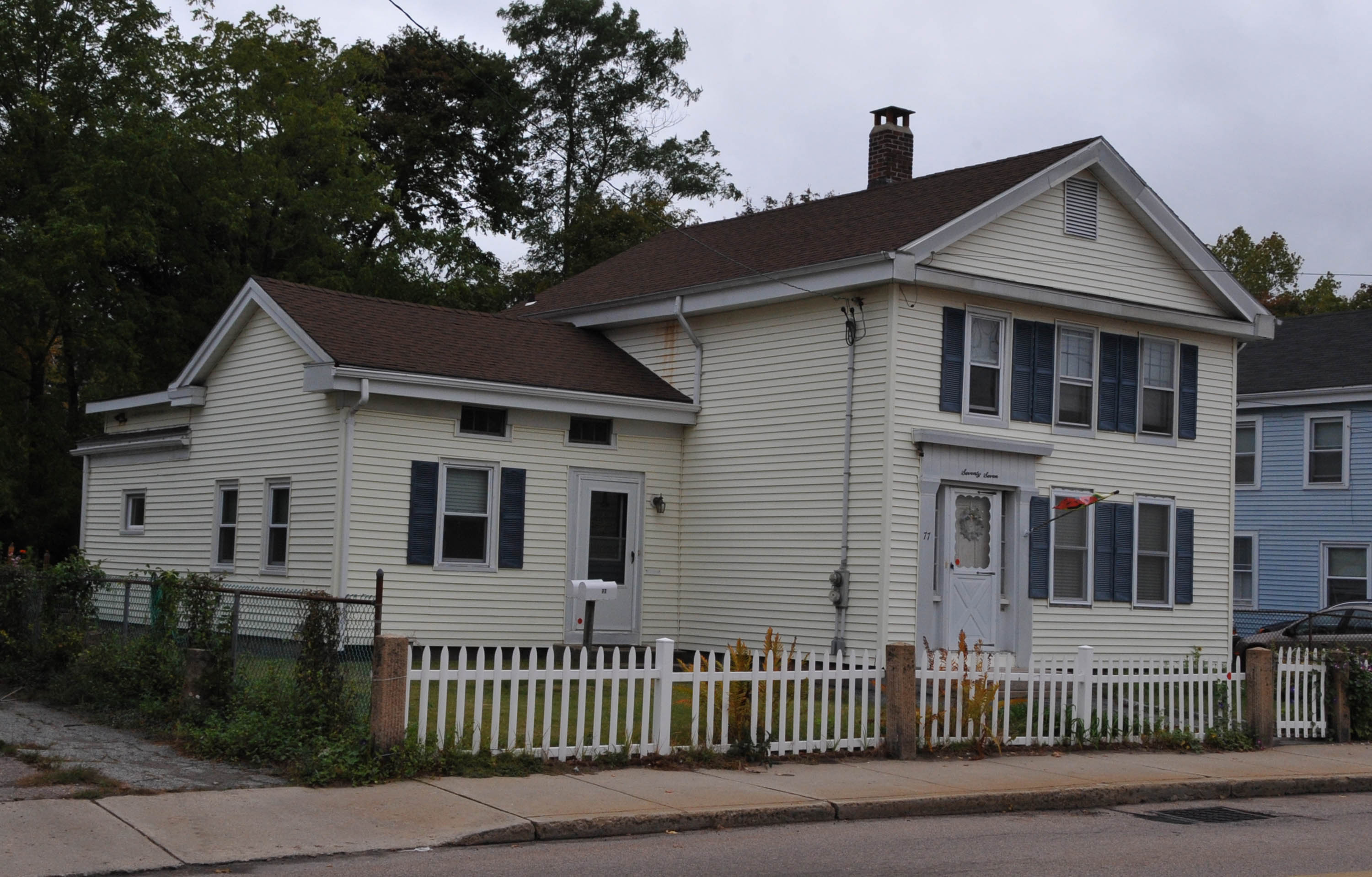
Worker's house on Mechanic Street

The historic district is 147 acres (59 ha) in size, bounded on the north by West Broad Street and the east by the Pawcatuck River. It includes a large waterfront mill complex, with 7 major buildings over a 25-acre (10 ha) area, and a smaller company office building. It extends westward from the mill as far as Courtland Street, the area beyond the railroad tracks consisting mainly of worker housing. The buildings in the residential area are stylistically diverse, including examples of Greek Revival housing from the shipyard period, and tenement-style housing built later in the 19th century.

== See also ==
- National Register of Historic Places listings in New London County, Connecticut
