= Theodore Stanton =

American journalist (1851–1925)

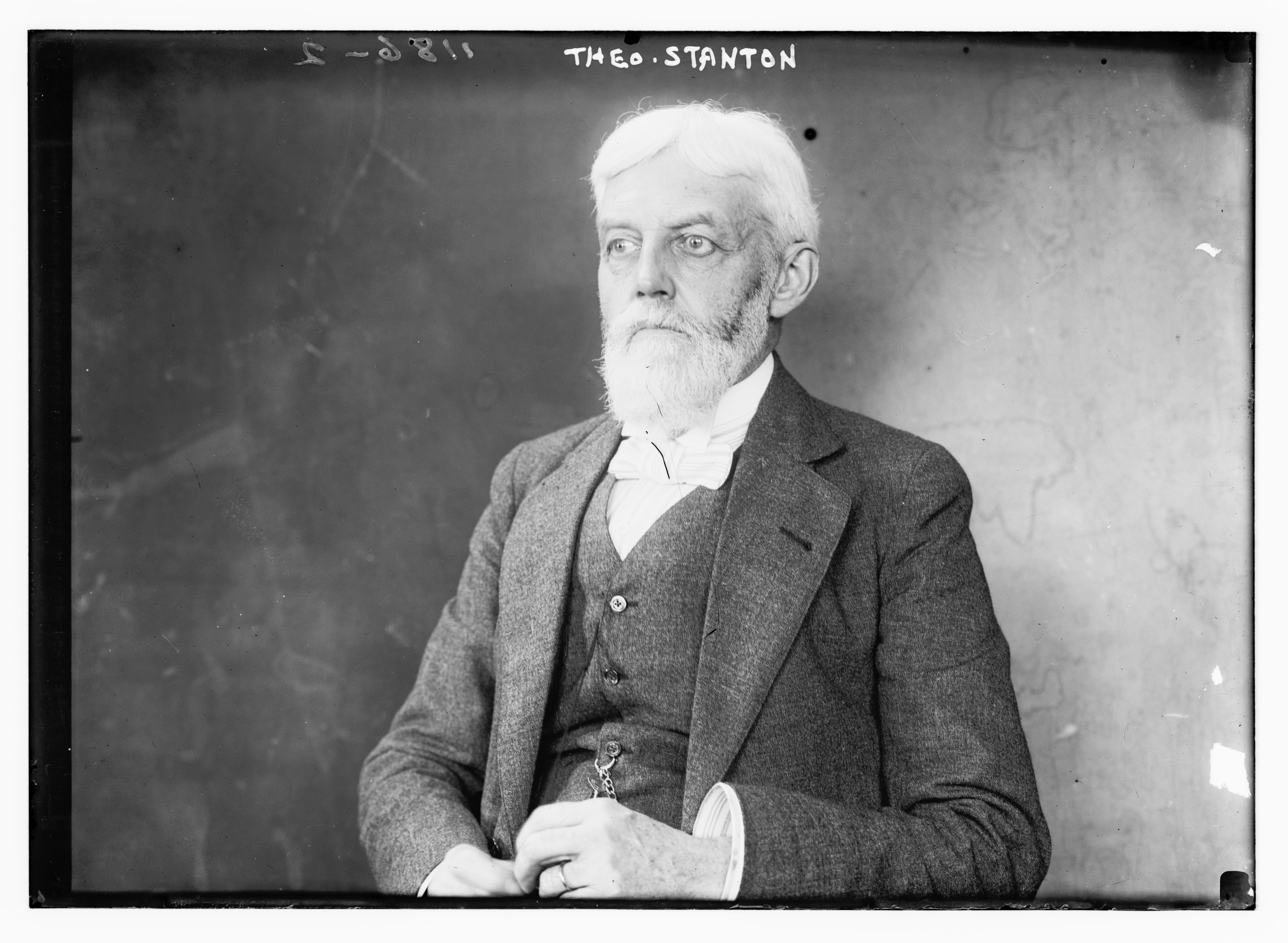

Theodore Weld Stanton (10 February 1851 in Seneca Falls, New York – 1925) was an American journalist.

== Biography ==
He was the son of journalist and abolitionist Henry Brewster Stanton and reformer Elizabeth Cady Stanton, and a descendant of Thomas Stanton. He graduated from Cornell in 1876. In 1880, he was the Berlin correspondent of the New York Tribune, and he afterward engaged in journalism in Paris, France.

== Works ==
He contributed to periodicals. Major works are:

- François J. Le Goff, Life of Thiers, translator and editor (New York, 1879)
- The Woman Question in Europe (1884)
- A manual of American literature (1909)
- Reminiscences of Rosa Bonheur (1910)
- "A Soldier of France to His Mother: Letters from the Trenches on the Western Front," Translator and Editor (1917)
