= Stanton–Davis Homestead Museum =

Historic house in Connecticut

- Robert Stanton House
- U.S. National Register of Historic Places
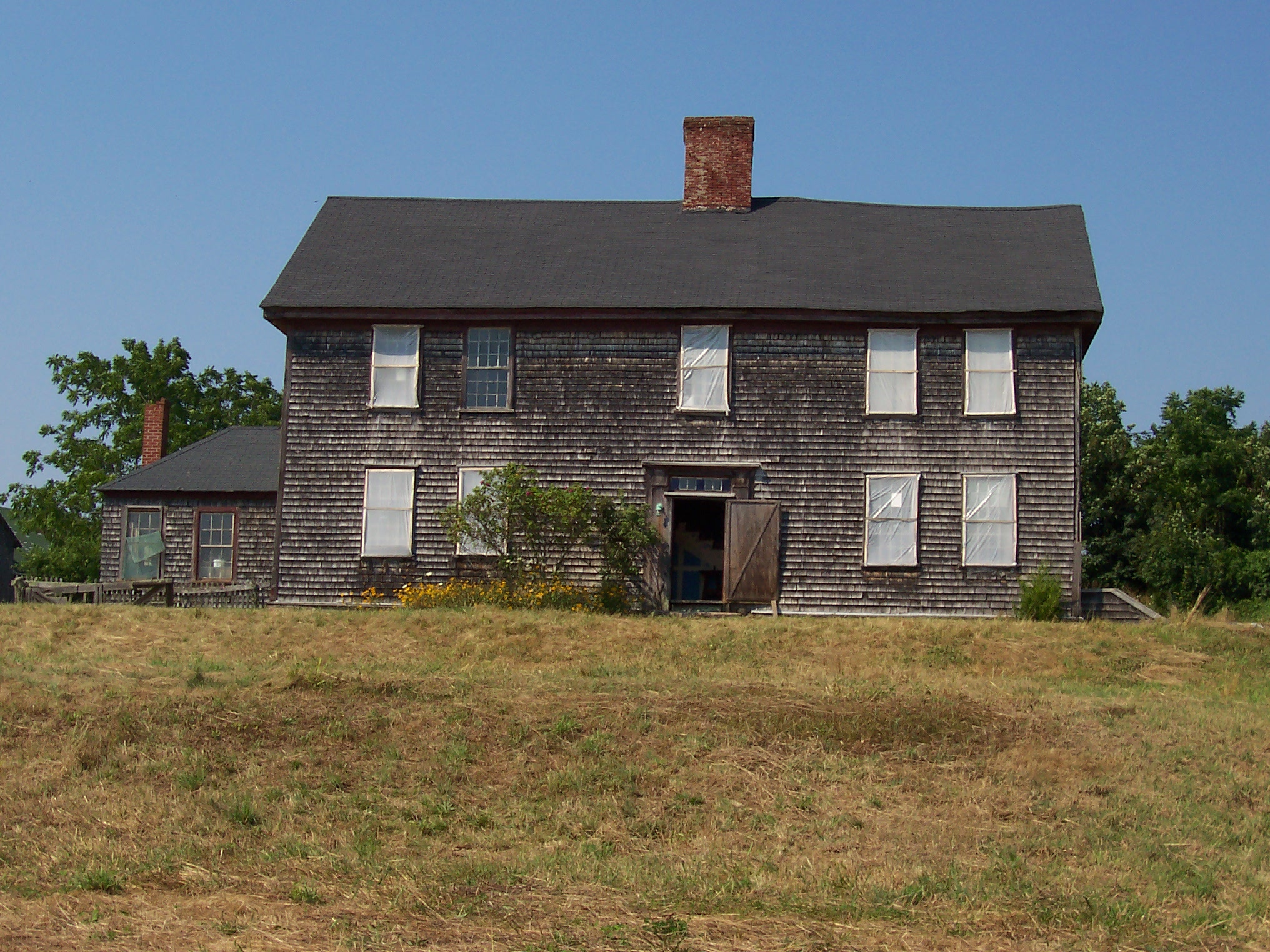
- Stanton-Davis Homestead

- Location within Connecticut Location within the United States
- Location: Greenhaven Road, Stonington, Connecticut
- Coordinates: 41°20′3″N 71°51′2″W
- Area: 227 acres (92 ha)
- Built: 1670-1700
- Architectural style: Colonial
- NRHP reference No.: 79002648
- Added to NRHP: June 04, 1979

The Stanton–Davis Homestead Museum (formerly known as the Robert Stanton House) is a historic house on Greenhaven Road in Stonington, Connecticut, built around 1700. The property has been a working farm for over 350 years by members of the Davis family. The Stanton-Davis Society is currently restoring it into a museum.

== Description and history ==
The Stanton-Davis Homestead is located in southeastern Stonington, at the junction of Green Haven Road with Osbrook Point Road. The principal feature of the homestead is the main house, a 2 1/2-story timber-framed structure with a gabled roof, central chimney, and shingled exterior. It is distinguished by its overhanging side gables, a sign of its great age, and its eaves, which are longer than typical for houses of the period. The interior follows a typical center chimney plan, with a narrow vestibule staircase featuring fine carved woodwork posts and balusters thought to originate in England. Interior woodwork also includes finely carved panels and a built-in cabinet dating to the 18th century. The house has never been fitted for a number of modern conveniences, including heating systems beyond its fireplaces.

Thomas Stanton was one of the original settlers of Stonington, establishing a trading post in Pawcatuck in 1649. He built this home around 1670. His great-grandson Robert Stanton put up the farm as collateral on a debt on October 24, 1764. Thomas Fanning of Groton and Ezra L'Hommedieu of Long Island held the note and ended up owning the farm when Stanton could not repay the note by 1765. Fanning and L'Hommedieu rented the property to John Davis of Long Island, and he bought the land outright in 1772. The property remained in the Davis family until the late 20th century, when it was passed to a family foundation which was formed to preserve the homestead as a museum.

== See also ==
- List of the oldest buildings in Connecticut
- National Register of Historic Places listings in New London County, Connecticut
