= Pawcatuck, Connecticut =

- Village
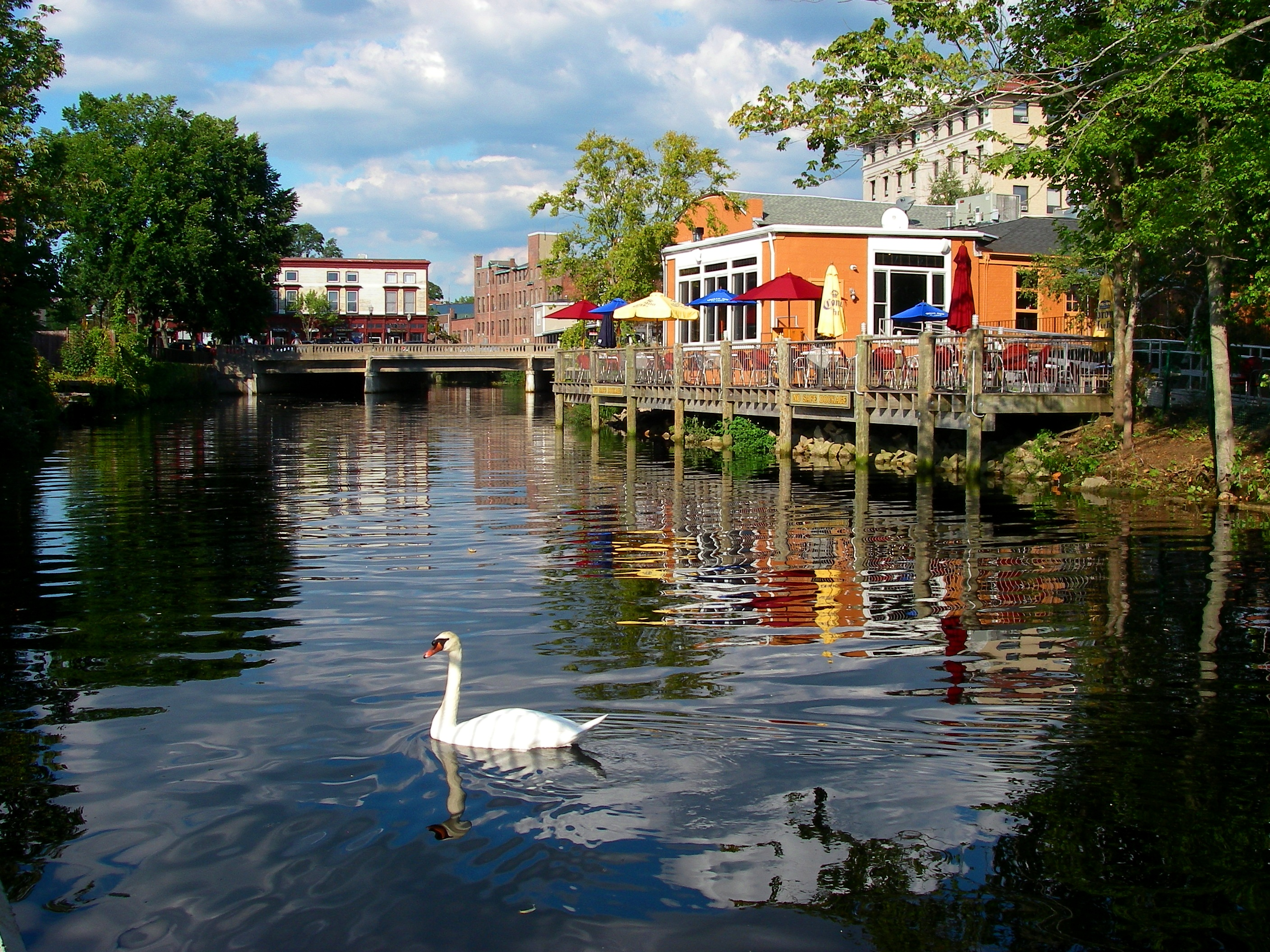
- Pawcatuck River next to the village

- Location in New London County, Connecticut
- Coordinates: 41°22′38″N 71°50′01″W
- Country: United States
- State: Connecticut
- Town: Stonington

Area
  - Total: 3.42 sq mi (8.9 km^{2})
  - Land: 3.41 sq mi (8.8 km^{2})
  - Water: 0.012 sq mi (0.031 km^{2})
- Elevation: 151 ft (46 m)

Population (2010)
  - Total: 5,624
  - Density: 1,644.4/sq mi (634.9/km^{2})
- Time zone: UTC−5 (Eastern (EST))
  - Summer (DST): UTC−4 (EDT)
- ZIP code: 06379
- Area code: 860
- FIPS code: 09-59140
- GNIS feature ID: 2377850

Pawcatuck (/ˈpɔːkətʌk/ PAW-kə-tuk) is a village and census-designated place (CDP) in the town of Stonington which is located in New London County, Connecticut, United States. The population was 5,624 at the 2010 census. It is located across the Pawcatuck River from Downtown Westerly, Rhode Island. The Mechanic Street Historic District of Pawcatuck is listed on the National Register of Historic Places and includes sites of shipbuilding, mills, and worker housing in a 147-acre (0.59 km^{2}) area.

== Demographics ==
The village of Pawcatuck has a total area of 3.42 square miles (8.87 km^{2}) bordered to the east by the Pawcatuck River. As of the census of 2000, there were 5,474 people, 2,427 households, and 1,439 families residing in the village. The population density was 1,479.9 inhabitants per square mile (571.4/km^{2}). There were 2,598 housing units at an average density of 702.4 per square mile (271.2/km^{2}). The racial makeup was 93.53% White, 0.75% African American, 0.69% Native American, 2.12% Asian, 0.05% Pacific Islander, 0.69% from other races, and 2.16% from two or more races. Hispanic or Latino of any race were 1.44% of the population. The median income for a household in Pawcatuck was $39,799, and the median income for a family was $53,087, and 9.3% of the population was below the poverty line.

== Education ==
The CDP, along with the rest of Stonington Town, is in Stonington School District.
