= Henry Brewster Stanton =

American politician (1805–1887)

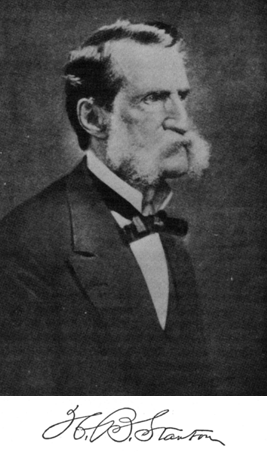
- Born: June 27, 1805; Preston, Connecticut, U.S.
- Died: January 14, 1887 (aged 81); New York City, U.S.
- Occupations: Lawyer; reformer; journalist; politician
- Spouse: Elizabeth Cady Stanton (m. 1840)
- Children: 8, including Theodore and Harriot
- Relatives: Nora Stanton Blatch Barney (granddaughter); Robert L. Stanton (brother)

Henry Brewster Stanton (June 27, 1805 – January 14, 1887) was an American abolitionist, social reformer, attorney, journalist and politician. His writing was published in the New York Tribune, the New York Sun, and William Lloyd Garrison's Anti-Slavery Standard and The Liberator. He was elected to the New York State Senate in 1850 and 1851. His wife, Elizabeth Cady Stanton, was a leading figure of the early women's rights movement.

== Early life ==
Stanton was born on June 27, 1805, in Preston, Connecticut, the son of Joseph Stanton and Susan M. Brewster. His father manufactured woolen goods and traded with the West Indies. He remembered his first desires for racial justice dated from his childhood, as he listened to a slave sing:

In my childhood we had a Negro slave whose voice was attuned to the sweetest cadence. Many a time did she lull me to slumber by singing this touching lament [the song of Miantonomi]. It sank deep into my breast, and moulded my advancing years. Before I reached manhood I resolved that I would become the champion of the oppressed colored races of my country.

== Career ==
Stanton became well known as an orator and writer, and used these skills as a journalist, attorney, and politician. In 1826, Stanton began writing for the Monroe Telegraph in Rochester, New York. It was owned by Thurlow Weed and was then promoting the presidential candidacy of Henry Clay. He began to make political speeches. Stanton also wrote for the New York Tribune, when Horace Greeley was editor, and then for the New York Sun until his death. He contributed to William Lloyd Garrison's Anti-Slavery Standard and The Liberator.

He began studying at the Oneida Institute, but was part of a group of 24 who left in 1832 for Cincinnati, Ohio, there to study theology at Lane Seminary. However, Stanton chose to start working in the abolitionist movement before completing his studies. After his marriage, Stanton studied law under his father-in-law Daniel Cady in Johnstown, New York. After passing the bar, he became a patent attorney in Boston, Massachusetts. Both he and his wife were actively and prominently engaged in the anti-slavery movement.

Due chiefly to Stanton's ill health, the family moved to Seneca Falls, New York, in 1847, where they resided in a house which Daniel Cady purchased for them. In Seneca Falls, Stanton continued his work in reform, journalism, and politics, often traveling, speaking, and writing on behalf of abolition. While living in Seneca Falls, Stanton helped organize the Free Soil Party (1848) and the Republican Party in 1856. He was elected as a member of the New York State Senate (25th D.) in 1850 and 1851.

Stanton was widely recognized as a premier American orator on social issues, and he was a primary spokesman for the abolitionist movement prior to the American Civil War. He was known for his skill in extemporaneous speaking. His wife reported that he was occasionally asked to speak on a random topic for the amusement of the audience.

After attending the first World Anti-Slavery Convention in London in 1840, Stanton spent several months on an anti-slavery European speaking tour, touring most of the principal cities of England, Scotland, Ireland, and France. Throughout their lives, Henry Stanton and Elizabeth Cady Stanton traveled widely, both jointly and separately, speaking and organizing for social causes that included temperance, abolition and women's rights. When Henry died unexpectedly of pneumonia in 1887, Elizabeth was in London speaking on behalf of voting rights for women.

Anti-Slavery Society Convention 1840, painting by Benjamin Robert Haydon. Henry Stanton, front row, second from right. Move your cursor to identify participants or click the icon to enlarge

Abolitionist and former slave Frederick Douglass provided Stanton's son, Theodore, this memory of the first time he heard Henry B. Stanton speak in public:

When I was escaping from bondage I was received under the humble but hospitable roof of Nathan Johnson, an old colored man. ...Nathan Johnson also told me all about Henry B. Stanton's wonderful oratorical powers, and took me one evening to hear him denounce the slave system. It was one of the first abolition lectures I ever heard, and this circumstance, combined with the eloquence of the speaker, left an ineffaceable impression on my mind. Your father was then unquestionably the best orator in the anti-slavery movement. I listened to him on many other occasions, but this first one, when I was fresh from slavery, naturally touched me the most deeply.

Politically and socially active throughout his life, Stanton served as Deputy County Clerk of Monroe County, New York, for three years. He was secretary of the American Anti-Slavery Society from 1835 to 1840. Stanton was appointed Deputy Collector of the Port of New York in 1861 and held the position until 1863.

Stanton's publications included many pamphlets on social issues. He wrote the book-length Sketches of Reforms and Reformers in Great Britain and Ireland (New York, 1849), an examination of British social conditions and activists. In addition, he was finishing the fourth edition of his autobiography Random Recollections (1885) at the time of his death.

== Personal life ==
His wife was Elizabeth Cady Stanton. The couple was married on May 1, 1840, and their wedding trip was spent in Europe where Henry B. Stanton was a delegate to the World's Anti-Slavery Convention in London that began on June 12, 1840. Together, they were the parents of seven children:

- Daniel Cady Stanton (1842–1891)
- Henry Brewster Stanton Jr. (1844–1903)
- Gerrit Smith Stanton (1845–1927)
- Theodore Weld Stanton (1851–1925)
- Margaret Livingston Stanton Lawrence (1852–1938)
- Harriot Eaton Stanton Blatch (1856–1940)
- Robert Livingston Stanton (1859–1920).

Stanton died from pneumonia on January 14, 1887, election night, while it was pouring rain in New York City.

New York State Senate
Preceded by Timothy S. Williams	New York State Senate; 25th District; 1850–1851	Succeeded by Josiah B. Williams
