= William Chesebrough =

New England colonist & settler (c.1594–1667)

Coat of Arms of William Chesebrough

William Chesebrough (c.1594–1667) was a farmer and trader in the colonies of Massachusetts and Connecticut. He was one of the four co-founders of Stonington, Connecticut, along with Thomas Stanton, Thomas Miner, and Walter Palmer.

Chesebrough came to America in 1630 in the party accompanying John Winthrop. He was elected constable in Boston in 1634. In 1640 he moved to Braintree, Massachusetts. In 1649 he moved to the head of the Wequetequock Cove in present-day Stonington.

Chesebrough and his wife Anna are buried in Stonington at the Wequetequock Cemetery.
