= Harriot Stanton Blatch =

American writer and suffragist

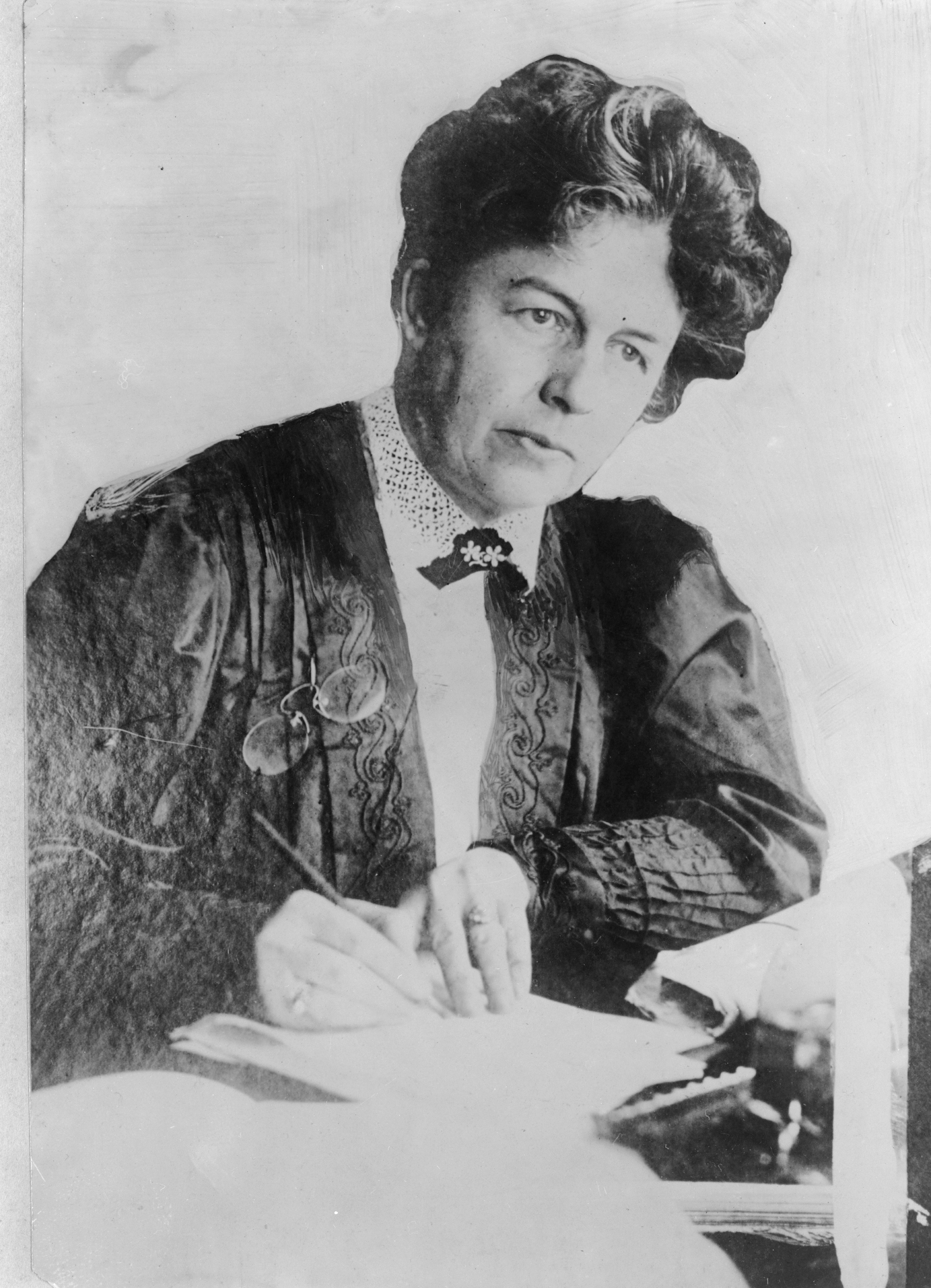
- Born: Harriot Eaton Stanton; January 20, 1856; Seneca Falls, New York, U.S.
- Died: November 20, 1940 (aged 84); Greenwich, Connecticut, U.S.
- Education: Vassar College
- Occupations: Writer; suffragist
- Spouse: William Henry Blatch Jr. (m. 1882; died 1915)
- Children: 2, including Nora Stanton Barney
- Parents: Henry Brewster Stanton (father); Elizabeth Cady (mother)

Harriot Eaton Blatch (née Stanton; January 20, 1856 – November 20, 1940) was an American writer and suffragist. She was the daughter of pioneering women's rights activist Elizabeth Cady Stanton.

== Biography ==
Harriot Eaton Stanton was born, the sixth of seven children, in Seneca Falls, New York, to social activists Elizabeth Cady Stanton and Henry Brewster Stanton. She attended Vassar College, where she graduated with a degree in mathematics in 1878. She attended the Boston School for Oratory for a year, and then spent most of 1880–81 in Germany as a tutor for young girls.

On her return voyage to the United States in May 1882, she met English businessman William Henry Blatch, Jr., known as "Harry Blatch". The two were married on 15 November 1882 at the Unitarian Chapel in Little Portland Street, Westminster. They lived in Basingstoke, Hampshire, for twenty years, where Harry was Brewery Manager of Basingstoke brewery, John May & Co.

They had two daughters, the second of whom died at age four. Their first daughter, Nora Stanton Barney, continued the family tradition as a suffragist, was the first U.S. woman to earn a degree in civil engineering, and was briefly married to Lee de Forest, before entering a longer second marriage. Harry Blatch died in 1915, after being accidentally electrocuted.

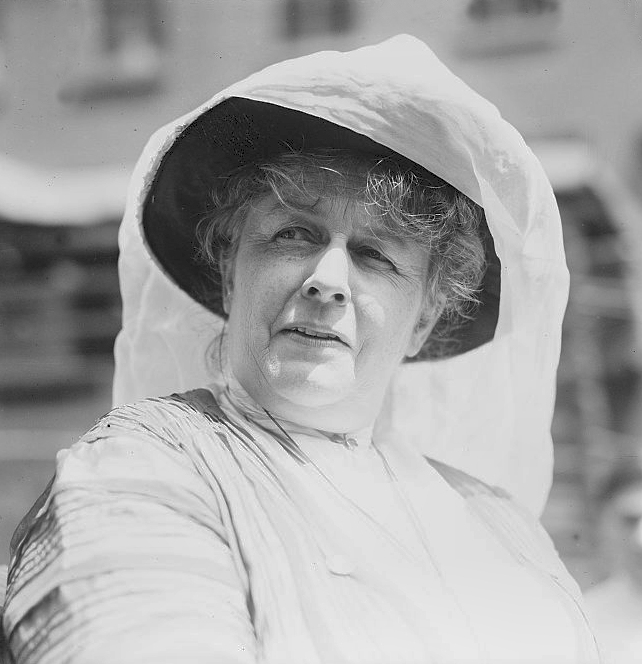
Harriot Stanton Blatch

In 1881, Harriot Stanton worked with her mother, Matilda Joslyn Gage, and Susan B. Anthony on the History of Woman Suffrage. She contributed a major chapter to the second volume, in which she included the history of the American Woman Suffrage Association, a rival of Stanton and Anthony's National Woman Suffrage Association. This action helped to reconcile the two organizations.

While in England, she performed a statistical study of rural English working women's conditions, for which she received her M.A. from Vassar College. In the 1901 census Blatch is recorded as a visitor in Haslemere, Surrey, in a house which formed part of the Haslemere Peasant Arts movement, a group which promoted the teaching of handicraft to rural women and girls. She also worked with English social reform groups, including the Women's Local Government Society, the Fabian Society, the Central National Society for Women's Suffrage, and the Women's Franchise League. In the Women's Franchise League, she developed organizing techniques that she would later use in America. She was friends with early leading British campaigners for women's suffrage, including Elizabeth Clarke Wolstenholme-Elmy and Emmeline Pankhurst.

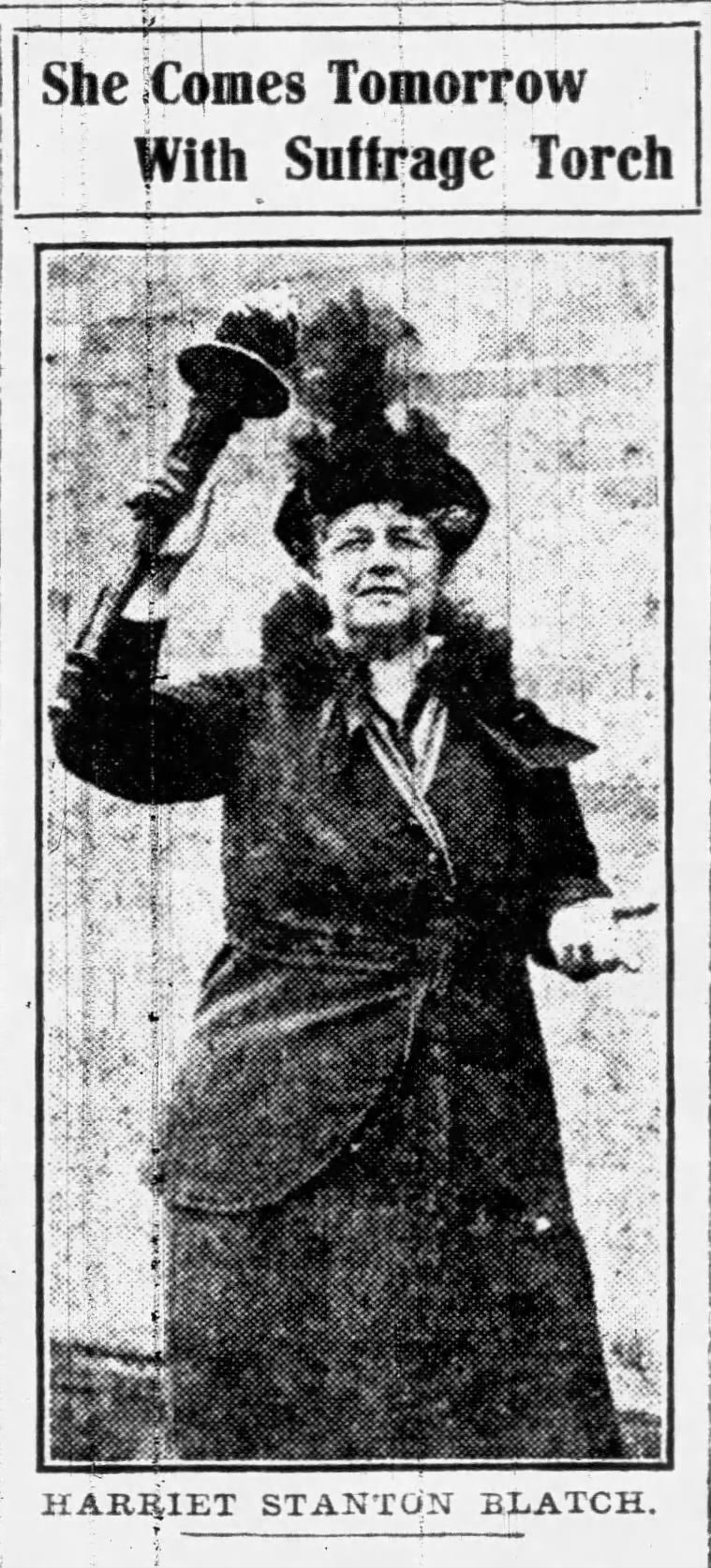
Newspaper clipping from the Buffalo Courier July 30, 1915

== Suffrage campaigns ==
On returning to the United States in 1902, Blatch sought to reinvigorate the American women's suffrage movement, which had stagnated. She initially joined the leadership of the Women's Trade Union League. In 1907, she founded the Equality League of Self-Supporting Women (later renamed the Women's Political Union), to recruit working class women into the suffrage movement. The core membership of the league comprised 20,000 factory, laundry, and garment workers from the Lower East Side of New York City. The organization successfully lobbied for an equal pay resolution for New York teachers.

Through this group, Blatch organized and led the 1910 New York suffrage parade. Blatch succeeded in mobilizing many working-class women, even as she continued to collaborate with prominent society women. She could organize militant street protests while still working expertly in backroom politics to neutralize the opposition of Tammany Hall politicians who feared the women would vote for prohibition. During her years advocating for women's rights, Blatch also published a book called Mobilizing Woman Power, which inspired women from across the United States to recognize their place in society.

The Union achieved significant political strength, and actively lobbied for a New York state constitutional amendment to give women the vote, which was achieved in 1917 after Tammany Hall relaxed its opposition. In 1915, Blatch's Women's Political Union merged with Alice Paul and Lucy Burns' Congressional Union, which eventually became the National Woman's Party.

== War and postwar ==
During World War I, Blatch devoted her time to the war effort, heading the Woman's Land Army of America, which provided additional farm labor. She wrote Mobilizing Woman Power in 1918, about women's role in the war effort, urging women to "go to work". In 1920, she published A Woman's Point of View, where she took a pacifist position due to the destruction of the war.

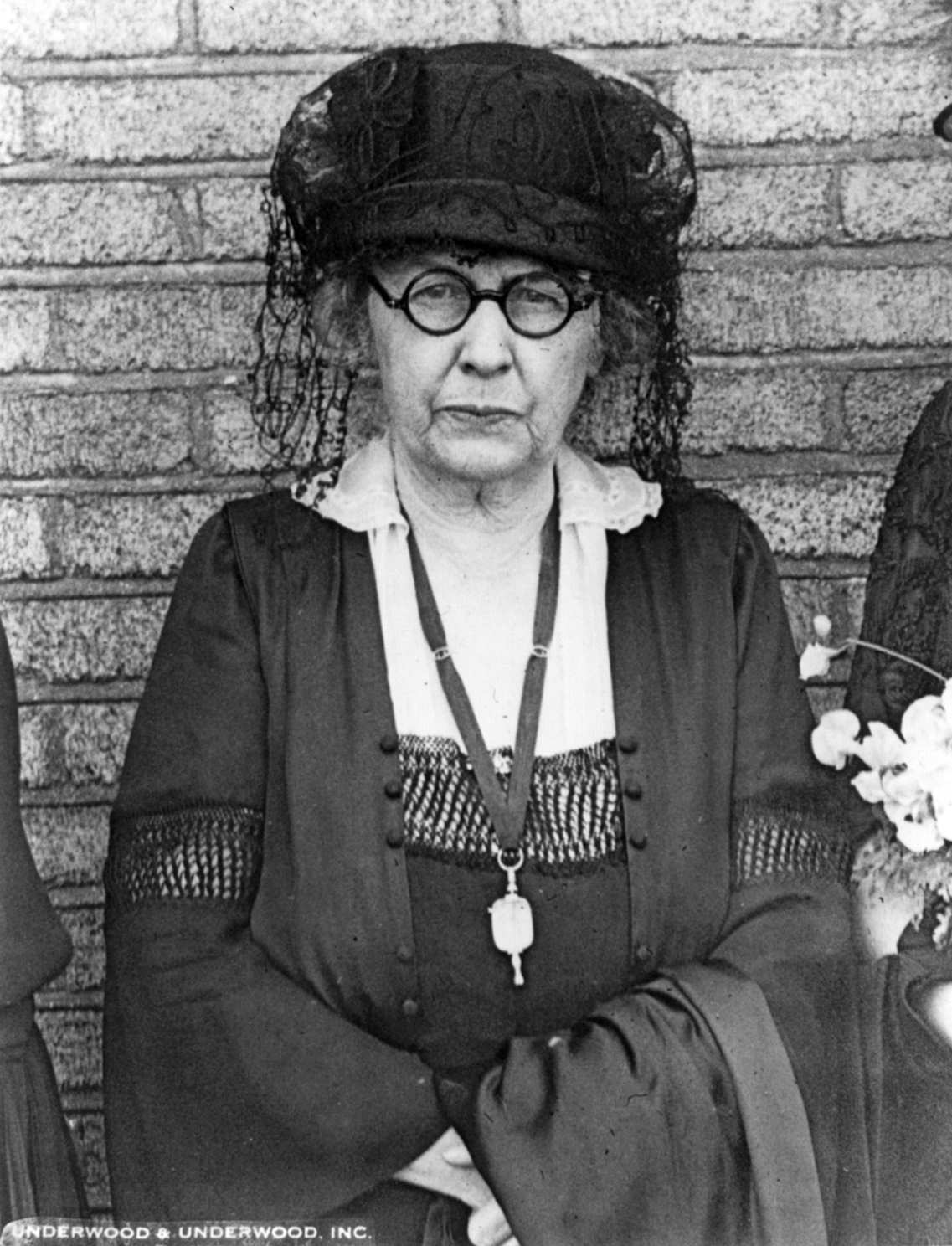
Harriot Stanton Blatch in 1926

After the passage of the Nineteenth Amendment in 1920, Blatch joined the National Woman's Party to fight for passage of the Equal Rights Amendment, rather than the protective legislation supported by the Women's Trade Union League. She also joined the Socialist Party, and was nominated for New York City Comptroller and later the New York State Assembly, but did not win office. She eventually left the party, because of its support for protective legislation for women workers. During the 1920s, Blatch also worked on behalf of the League of Nations, proposing improvements for the amendments to the League's Covenant.

== Last years and death ==
In 1939, Blatch suffered a fractured hip and moved to a nursing home in Greenwich, Connecticut. Her memoir, Challenging Years, was published in 1940 and she died the week before Thanksgiving that same year in Greenwich.

== See also ==
- Suffrage Torch
- List of suffragists and suffragettes
- Timeline of women's suffrage
- Women's suffrage organizations
