= Ellery Thompson =

Ellery Thompson (1899–1986) was an American fisherman, writer, and artist who lived at one time or another in the Connecticut shore towns of Stonington, Groton, Mystic and New London. In 1950 he published the autobiographical Draggerman's Haul: The Personal Story of a Connecticut Fishing Captain about the new technique of using dragger nets to sweep the bottom of the ocean; his work with Yale fishery biologists; the effect of Prohibition on ocean fishing; the efforts to make a feature film from his books; and his years on shore after leaving fishing in 1958, including a stint at Mystic Seaport Museum.

He was a painter of ships and ocean scenes as well as a writer and storyteller, and was profiled in The New Yorker magazine in two 1947 articles by Joseph Mitchell. Come Aboard the Draggers, published in 1958, was a sequel to Draggerman's Haul. A third book, Draggerman's Loot, was never published. Draggerman's Haul was republished by Flat Hammock Press in 2007.

The Stonington Historical Society ran a major exhibit of his paintings in 2005, curated by Susan Tamulevich and Bernard Gordon. The Society reported at the time (corrections made in 2020):

In his 1947 profile, Mitchell characterized Thompson as a "sad-eyed, easygoing Connecticut Yankee" and as a member of a family that had "fished and clammed and crabbed and attended to lobster traps" in Stonington waters for three hundred years. Thompson is "the most-highly respected captain in the Stonington fishing fleet," he wrote. Thompson fished the waters between New London and Martha's Vineyard for more than 40 years. He told colorful stories, played the trumpet and painted for fun until it began to make him money, too. He retired from fishing in 1958 and died in 1987 at the age of 86....

The Custom House Maritime Museum in New London, Connecticut displays a number of Thompson's paintings and other artifacts in its permanent collection. The Museum's library published an online exhibit about Ellery Thompson in March, 2020, which may be seen via a link on the New London Maritime Society website, or Google, or directly at: mcguirelibrary1998.omeka.net
