= Nora Stanton Barney =

American civil engineer and suffragist

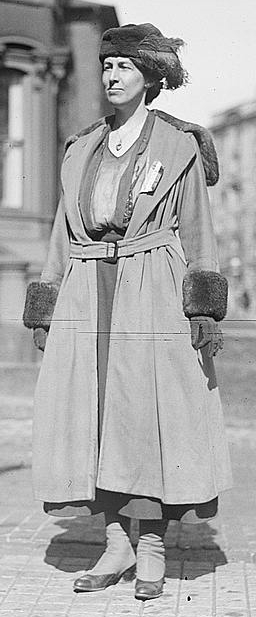
- Barney in 1921
- Born: Nora Stanton Blatch; 30 September 1883; Basingstoke, Hampshire, England
- Died: 18 January 1971 (aged 87); Greenwich, Connecticut, U.S.
- Occupation: Civil engineer suffragist
- Spouses: Lee De Forest (m. 1908; div. 1911) Morgan Barney (m. 1919; died 1943)
- Children: 2
- Mother: Harriot Eaton Stanton
- Relatives: Elizabeth Cady Stanton (grandmother); Henry Brewster Stanton (grandfather)

Nora Stanton Barney (née Blatch; 30 September 1883 – 18 January 1971) was an English-born American civil engineer and suffragist. Barney was among the first women to graduate with an engineering degree in the United States. Given an ultimatum to either stay a wife or practice engineering she chose engineering. She was the granddaughter of Elizabeth Cady Stanton.

== Early life ==
She was born Nora Stanton Blatch in Basingstoke, Hampshire, England, in 1883 to William Blatch and Harriot Eaton Stanton, daughter of Elizabeth Cady Stanton. She studied Latin and mathematics at the Horace Mann School in New York, beginning in 1897, returning to England in the summers. The family moved to the United States in 1902. Nora attended Cornell University, graduating in 1905 with a degree in civil engineering. She was Cornell University's first female engineering graduate. In the same year, she was the first woman admitted (accepted as a junior member) of the American Society of Civil Engineers (ASCE). She also began work for the New York City Board of Water Supply and for the American Bridge Company from 1905 to 1906.

Following the examples set by her mother and grandmother, Nora also became active in the growing women's suffrage movement. She was the first female member of the American Society of Civil Engineers, where she was allowed to be a junior member only and denied advancement to associate member in 1916 solely because of her gender. At the time, women were only admitted as junior members. In 1916, she sued the American Society of Civil Engineers (ASCE) for refusing to admit her as a full member, even though she met all requirements. Blatch lost, and no woman became a full ASCE member for a decade. In 2015, she was posthumously advanced to ASCE Fellow status.

== Marriage to Lee de Forest ==
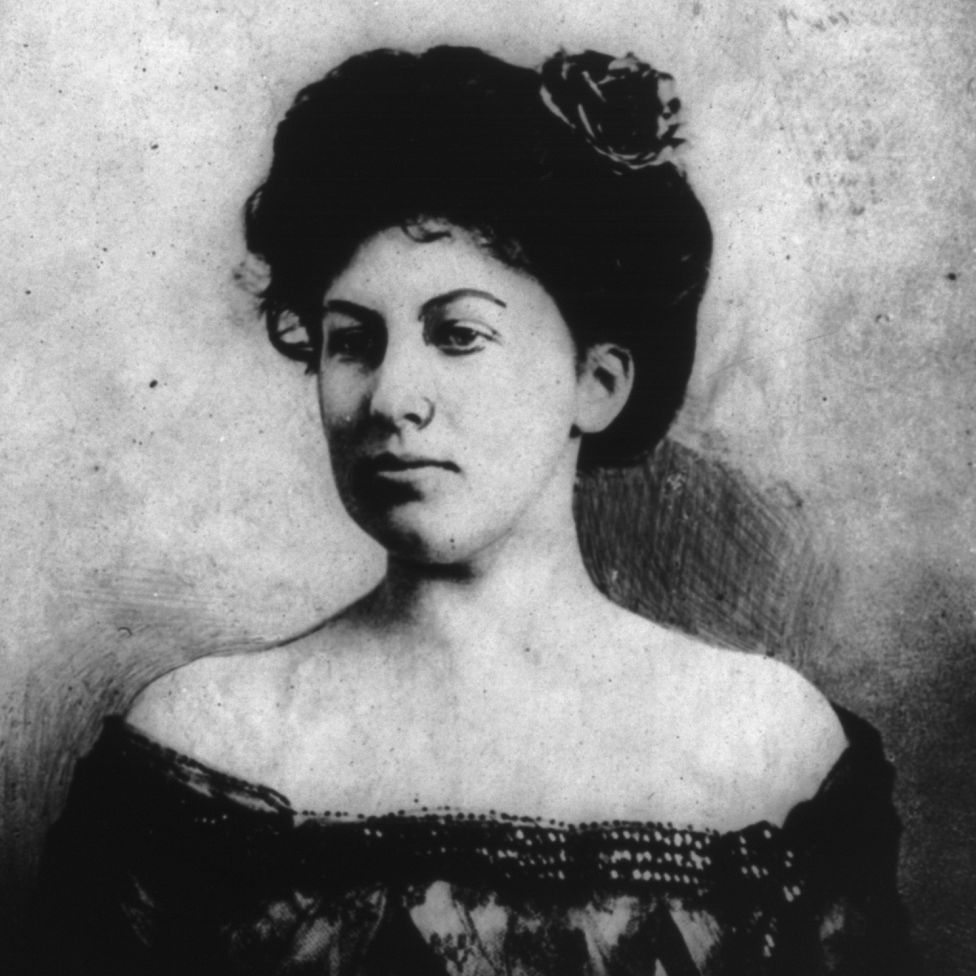
Barney when she was younger

In 1908, she married the inventor Lee de Forest, and helped to manage some of the companies he had founded to promote his invention and the new technology of wireless (radio). The couple spent their honeymoon in Europe marketing radio equipment developed by de Forest. However, the couple separated only a year later, due largely to de Forest's insistence that Nora quit her profession and become a conventional housewife. Shortly afterward, in June 1909, Nora gave birth to their daughter, Harriet. In 1909, she began working as an engineer for the Radley Steel Construction Company. She divorced de Forest in 1912. After her divorce, she continued her engineering career, working for the New York State Public Service Commission.

== Later life ==
In 1919, Nora married Morgan Barney, a marine architect. Their daughter, Rhoda Barney Jenkins, born 12 July 1920, in New York, was an architect and social activist. Rhoda died on 25 August 2007, in Greenwich. Nora continued to work for equal rights for women and world peace, and in 1944 authored World Peace Through a People's Parliament.

Nora worked as a real-estate developer and political activist until her death in Greenwich, Connecticut on 18 January 1971. She is buried in Woodlawn Cemetery and Conservancy, Bronx NY with Memorial ID 92785151.

== Career and Contributions ==
After graduating, Barney worked for the American Bridge Company as a drafter. She later took a position with the New York Public Service Commission and was instrumental in planning and designing bridges, subway stations, and other infrastructure projects. However, she was frequently denied full professional status within these organizations due to her gender.

In 1906, she applied for membership in the American Society of Civil Engineers (ASCE) and was accepted as a junior member. However, when she applied for associate membership, the ASCE rejected her on the grounds of her gender. This setback did not deter her from continuing her work in engineering and activism.

Barney later became an advocate for the integration of women into STEM fields, using her influence to encourage other women to pursue careers in science and engineering. She also studied architecture and engaged in real estate development, where she focused on designing practical and affordable housing.

== Activism and Women's Rights Advocacy ==
Following in the footsteps of her mother and grandmother, Barney was deeply involved in the women’s suffrage movement. She played a key role in the campaign for women’s voting rights and worked closely with the National Woman’s Party. She was an outspoken critic of gender-based employment discrimination and worked toward securing equal opportunities for women in technical professions.

During her career, she wrote and spoke extensively on the intersection of feminism and labor rights, emphasizing the importance of women's economic independence. She actively participated in the Equal Rights Amendment movement and supported policies aimed at closing the gender wage gap.

== Impact and Legacy ==
Nora Stanton Blatch Barney’s contributions to civil engineering and women's rights had a lasting impact. Her work in engineering helped pave the way for future generations of women in STEM fields. Although her rejection from ASCE symbolized the systemic barriers faced by women in engineering at the time, her advocacy and perseverance contributed to the gradual inclusion of women in professional engineering organizations.

Her activism in women’s rights and labor equality inspired many later movements for gender equality in the workplace. Today, she is recognized as a trailblazer who helped dismantle gender barriers in engineering and beyond.

The legacy of Barney’s work is reflected in the increasing number of women in engineering and the policies that promote workplace inclusivity and equal opportunities. In 2015, ASCE posthumously recognized her contributions, acknowledging her as a pioneer in civil engineering. Her life's work remains relevant as discussions about gender equality in STEM continue.
