= Stonington, Connecticut =

- Town
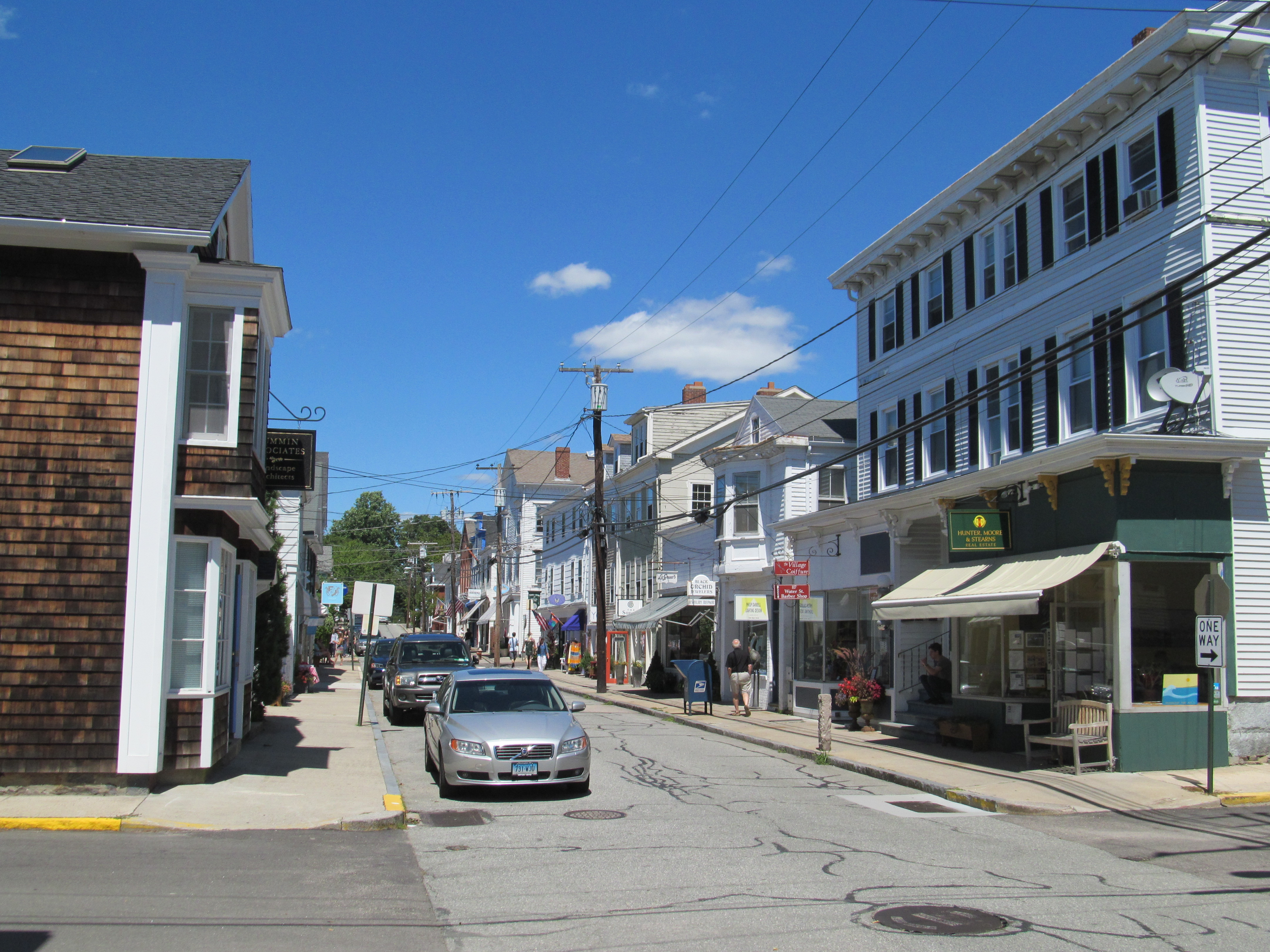
- Stonington, Connecticut, August 2012

- Seal

- Coordinates: 41°21′54″N 71°54′24″W
- Country: United States
- U.S. state: Connecticut
- County: New London
- Region: Southeastern CT
- Settled: 1649
- Established: 1662

Government
  - Type: Selectman-town meeting
  - First selectman: Bill Middleton (D)
  - Other selectmen: Deborah Norman (D), Bryan Bentz (R)

Area
  - Total: 48.98 sq mi (126.85 km^{2})
  - Land: 38.66 sq mi (100.12 km^{2})
  - Water: 10.32 sq mi (26.72 km^{2})
- Elevation: 75 ft (23 m)

Population (2020)
  - Total: 18,335
  - Density: 474.31/sq mi (183.13/km^{2})
- Time zone: UTC-5 (Eastern)
  - Summer (DST): UTC-4 (Eastern)
- ZIP Codes: 06355, 06378, 06379
- Area code: 860/959
- FIPS code: 09-73770
- GNIS feature ID: 0213513
- Website: www.stonington-ct.gov

Stonington is a town located on Long Island Sound in New London County, Connecticut. The municipal limits of the town include the borough of Stonington, the villages of Pawcatuck, Lords Point, and Wequetequock, and the eastern halves of the villages of Mystic and Old Mystic. Stonington is part of the Southeastern Connecticut Planning Region. The population of the town was 18,335 at the 2020 census. The town is home to many restored homes and preserves its long nautical history.

== History ==
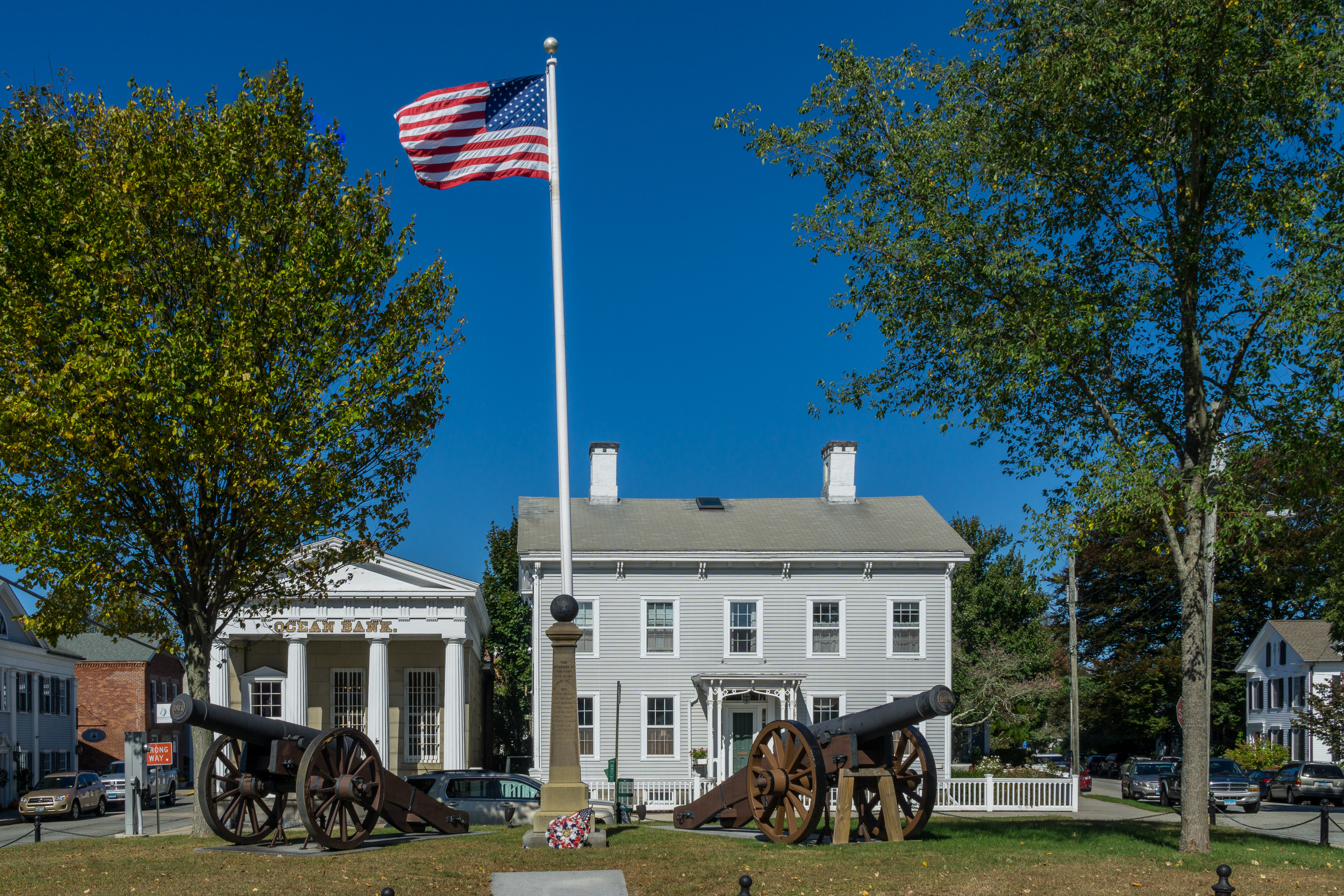
The memorial to the 1814 bombardment of Stonington in Cannon Square

The first European colonists to arrive include William Chesebrough and Walter Palmer in Wequetequock, Thomas Minor in Quiambaug, and Thomas Stanton in Pawcatuck. Stanton established a trading house in the Pawcatuck section of town in 1649. The present territory of Stonington was part of lands that had belonged to the Pequot people, who referred to the areas making up Stonington as Paquatuck (Stony Brook to the Pawcatuck River) and Mistack (Mystic River to Stony Brook). It was named "Souther Towne" or Southerton by Massachusetts in 1658, and officially became part of Connecticut in 1662 when Connecticut received its royal charter. Southerton was renamed "Mistick" in 1665, and finally named Stonington in 1666, meaning "stony town". The town of North Stonington was set off as a parish from Stonington in 1724 and incorporated as a town in 1807.

Sir Thomas Hardy led a British squadron during the War of 1812 consisting of HMS Ramillies, HMS Pactolus, HMS Dispatch, and HMS Terror. The ships appeared off Stonington Point on August 9, 1814, and Hardy demanded that the town surrender. The town Selectmen replied with a note which stated, "We shall defend the place to the last extremity; should it be destroyed, we shall perish in its ruins."

Hardy's squadron then bombarded Stonington for three days using stinkpots, while American forces in the town responded by firing at the British warships with two 18-pounder cannons. The only American casualty from the bombardment was an elderly woman who was already mortally ill, while Hardy's squadron suffered several killed and wounded before sailing away on August 12. American poet Philip Freneau wrote:

The bombardiers with bomb and ball
Soon made a farmer's barrack fall,
And did a cow-house badly maul
That stood a mile from Stonington.

They kill'd a goose, they kill'd a hen
Three hogs they wounded in a pen—
They dashed away and pray what then?
This was not taking Stonington.

But some assert, on certain grounds,
(Beside the damage and the wounds),
It cost the king ten thousand pounds
To have a dash at Stonington.

A memorial in Cannon Square at the center of Stonington Borough was constructed to memorialize the 1814 bombardment that became known as the Battle of Stonington. It consists of the two 18-pounder cannons that were used by American forces during the engagement and a granite obelisk.

From the 1790s onward, Stonington experienced an economic upturn as its harbor became home to a fleet of American merchant ships engaged in seal hunting, targeting whales off the Patagonian coastline and selling their skins in China. Six sealing ships from Stonington commanded by Benjamin Pendleton set sail in 1820 to hunt whales off Deception Island, and on November 16, 1820 Nathaniel Palmer first sighted Palmer Land, which was named for him.

The Stonington Harbor Light is a low stone building erected in 1840. In 1925, it became the flagship museum of the Stonington Historical Society, making it the oldest lighthouse museum in America. During the 19th century, Stonington supported a small fishing, whaling, and sealing fleet that carried out trade with the West Indies—with enough volume for it to be made a port of entry in 1842. This saw a huge explosion in Portuguese immigration to the village from the Azores via whaling vessels. The small granite Customs House faces Main Street just north of Cannon Square.

The Groton and Stonington Street Railway was a trolley line created in 1904 to serve the Stonington area. The trolley was dismantled and replaced by buses in 1928. In recent decades, Stonington has experienced a large influx of new home owners using historic Stonington Borough houses as second homes. The town has undergone a widespread reconditioning of these homes since the mid-1990s, when an altercation over property rights attracted substantial news coverage about Stonington's revitalization. Today, Stonington is home to the last commercial fishing fleet in Connecticut.

== Geography ==
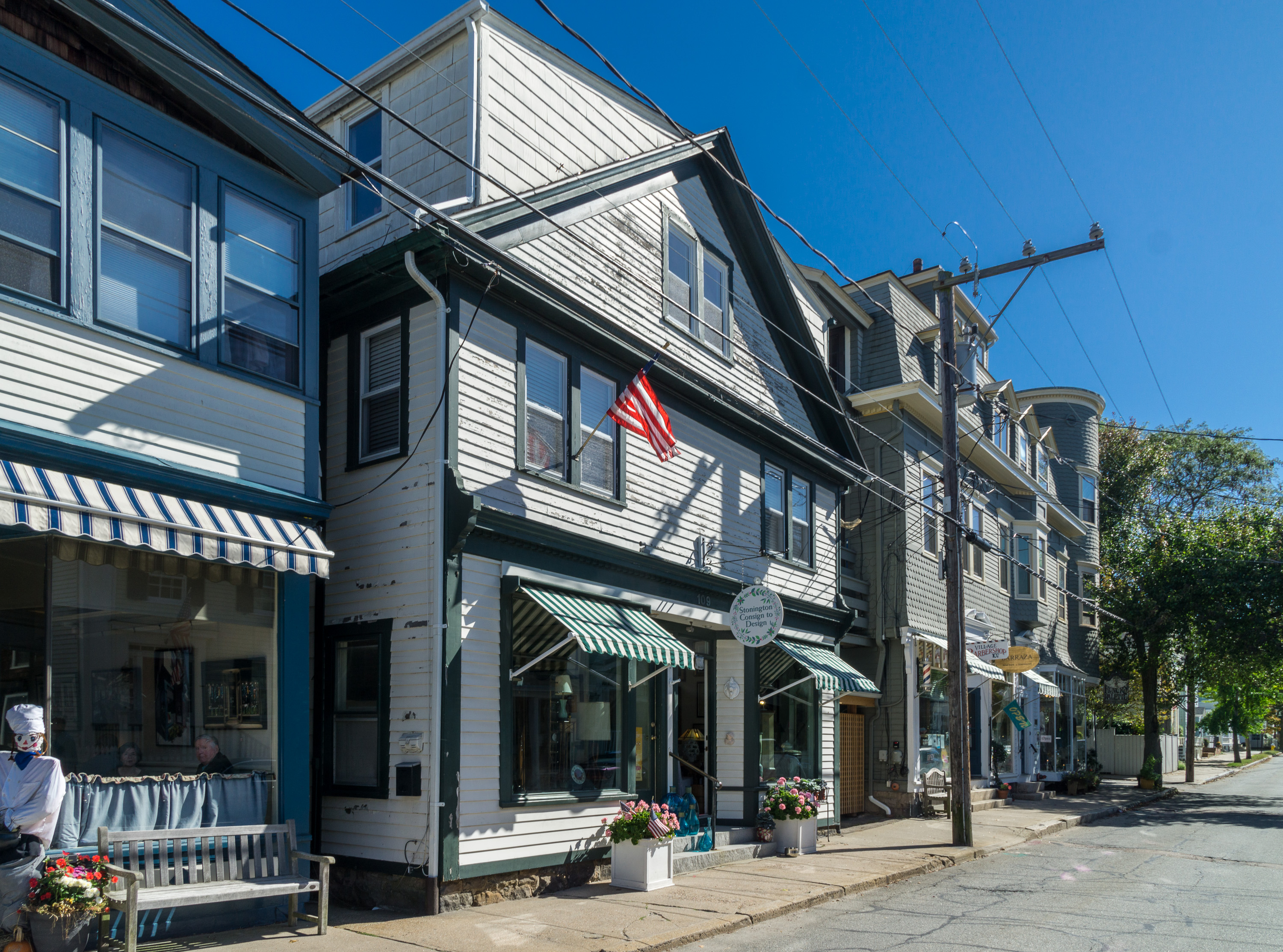
Water Street shops and restaurants in Historic Stonington

According to the U.S. Census Bureau, the town has a total area of 50.0 sq mi (129.6 km^{2}), of which 38.7 sq mi (100.2 km^{2}) is land and 11.4 sq mi (29.4 km^{2}) (or 22.68%), is water.

In the waters off Stonington, the states of New York, Connecticut, and Rhode Island converge at a single point.

=== Communities ===
- Lords Point (06378)
- Mystic (06355) (partly in the town of Groton)
  - Enders Island, Greenmanville, Mason's Island, Pequotsepos, Quiambaug, Seaport Heights
- Old Mystic (06372) (mostly in the town of Groton)
  - Quaketaug Hill, Wolf Neck
- Pawcatuck (06379)
  - Anguilla, Anguilla Acres, Blueberry Hill, Brookside, Castle Hill, Clarksville, Downerville, Hinckley Hill, Lower Pawcatuck, Oak Hill Gardens, Solomonville, Stillmanville, The Highlands, Berry Hill, Wequetequock Hill
- Stonington Borough (06378)
- Wequetequock (06379)

Other minor communities include Deans Mill, Grand View Park, Greenhaven, Ledward Island, Ram Island, Road Church District, and Wamphassuc Point.

=== Climate ===
Like much of coastal Connecticut, Stonington lies close to the transition zone between the southern end of the humid continental climate (Dfa/Dfb) and the humid subtropical zone Cfa. Stonington falls into USDA hardiness zones 7a.

Climate data for Stonington, Connecticut
Month	Jan	Feb	Mar	Apr	May	Jun	Jul	Aug	Sep	Oct	Nov	Dec	Year
Mean daily maximum °F (°C)	38 (3)	39 (4)	47 (8)	56 (13)	66 (19)	75 (24)	81 (27)	80 (27)	73 (23)	62 (17)	53 (12)	43 (6)	59 (15)
Mean daily minimum °F (°C)	23 (−5)	25 (−4)	31 (−1)	40 (4)	48 (9)	57 (14)	63 (17)	62 (17)	56 (13)	45 (7)	37 (3)	29 (−2)	43 (6)
Average precipitation inches (mm)	4.39 (112)	3.54 (90)	4.46 (113)	4.23 (107)	3.79 (96)	3.67 (93)	3.31 (84)	4.46 (113)	4.06 (103)	3.98 (101)	4.51 (115)	4.32 (110)	48.72 (1,237)
Source: The Weather Channel

== Demographics ==
Historical population
Census	Pop.	Note	%±
1820	3,036		—
1840	3,898		—
1850	5,753		47.6%
1860	5,827		1.3%
1870	6,313		8.3%
1880	7,355		16.5%
1890	7,184		−2.3%
1900	8,540		18.9%
1910	9,154		7.2%
1920	10,236		11.8%
1930	11,025		7.7%
1940	11,002		−0.2%
1950	11,801		7.3%
1960	13,969		18.4%
1970	15,940		14.1%
1980	16,220		1.8%
1990	16,919		4.3%
2000	17,906		5.8%
2010	18,545		3.6%
2020	18,335		−1.1%
U.S. Decennial Census

As of the census of 2000, there were 17,906 people, 7,665 households, and 4,897 families residing in the town. The population density was 462.8 inhabitants per square mile (178.7/km^{2}). There were 8,591 housing units at an average density of 222.1 per square mile (85.8/km^{2}). The racial makeup of the town was 95.81% White, 0.63% Black or African American, 0.37% Native American, 1.26% Asian, 0.05% Pacific Islander, 0.46% from other races, and 1.42% from two or more races. Hispanic or Latino of any race were 1.30% of the population.

There were 7,665 households, out of which 26.2% had children under the age of 18 living with them, 51.9% were married couples living together, 8.9% had a female householder with no husband present, and 36.1% were non-families. 30.0% of all households were made up of individuals, and 11.9% had someone living alone who was 65 years of age or older. The average household size was 2.31 and the average family size was 2.88.

In the town, the population was spread out, with 21.7% under the age of 18, 5.4% from 18 to 24, 28.5% from 25 to 44, 27.0% from 45 to 64, and 17.5% who were 65 years of age or older. The median age was 42 years. For every 100 females, there were 94.5 males. For every 100 females age 18 and over, there were 92.1 males.

The median income for a household in the town was $52,437, and the median income for a family was $63,431. Males had a median income of $45,596 versus $32,069 for females. The per capita income for the town was $29,653. About 2.9% of families and 5.0% of the population were below the poverty line, including 5.4% of those under age 18 and 5.7% of those age 65 or over.

== Arts and culture ==
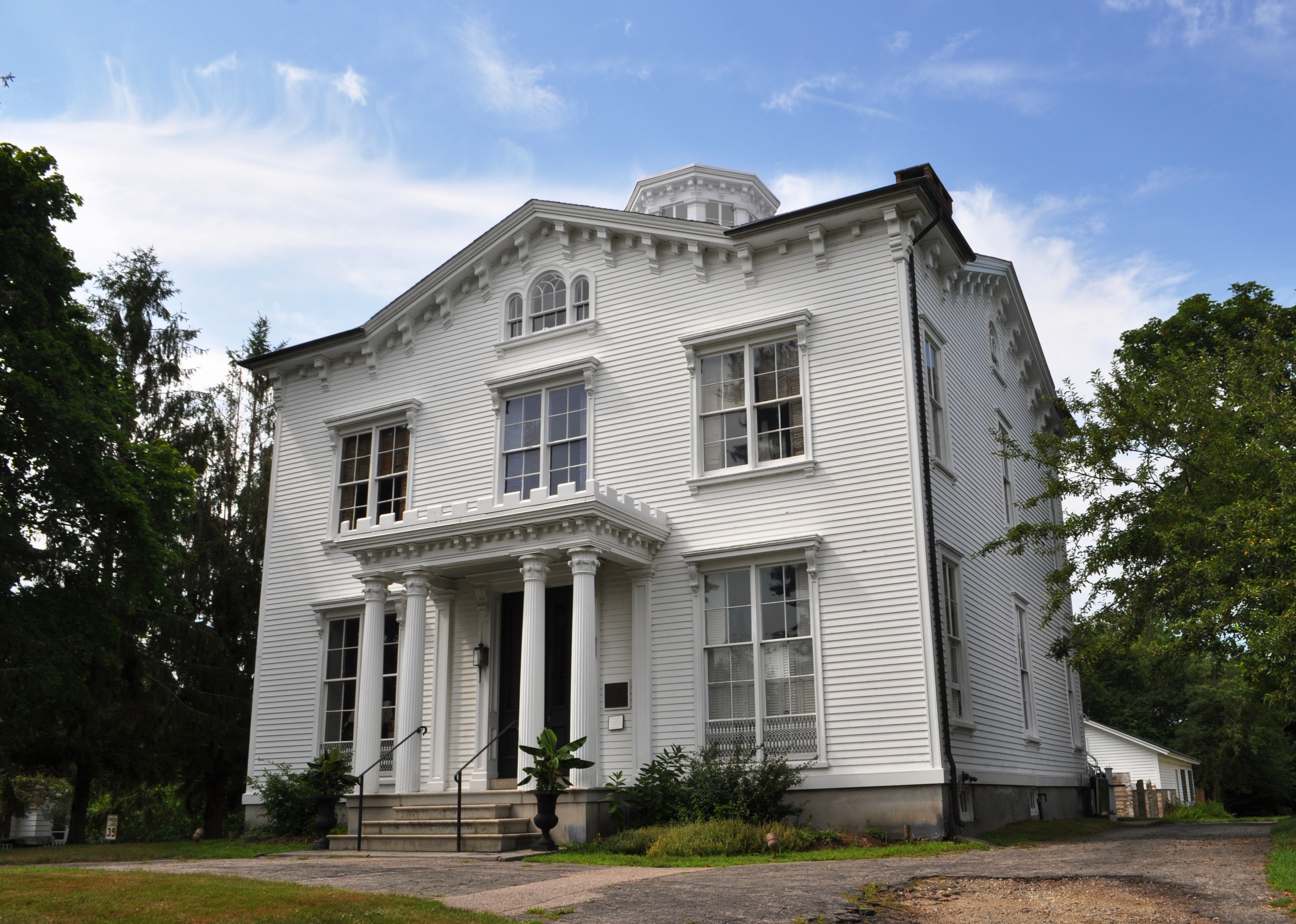
Capt. Nathaniel B. Palmer House

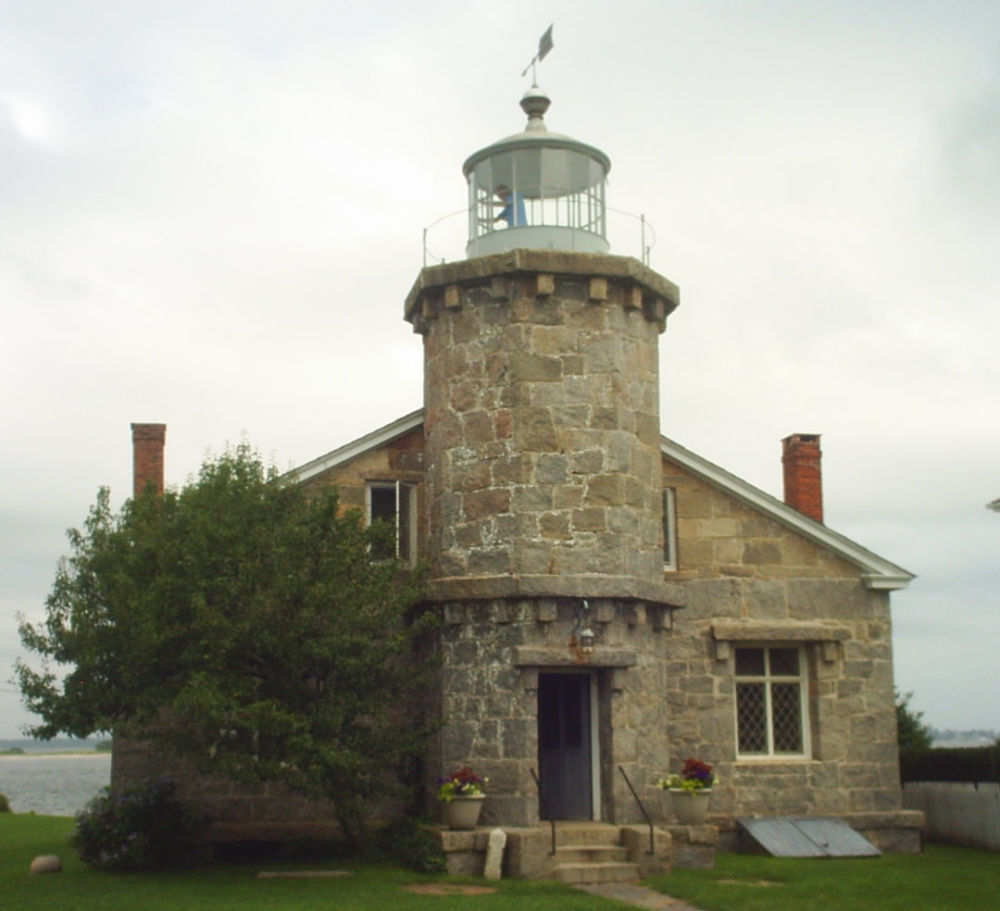
Stonington Harbor Light

Buildings listed on the National Register of Historic Places include:

- Capt. Nathaniel B. Palmer House
- Mechanic Street Historic District – The district covers 1,470 acres (590 ha) and contains 413 buildings and one other structure.
- Mystic Bridge Historic District
- Pequotsepos Manor
- Rossie Velvet Mill Historic District
- Stanton-Davis Homestead Museum - also known as the Robert Stanton House
- Stonington Harbor Light
- Stonington Borough School
- Whitehall Mansion
- William Clark Company Thread Mill

== Media ==
Stonington has been used for several on-location movie shoots, including Steven Spielberg's Amistad and Julia Roberts' Mystic Pizza. It was used extensively for Hope Springs, with Meryl Streep and Tommy Lee Jones filming scenes in Stonington Borough.

== Notable people ==
- Peter Benchley (1940–2006), author of Jaws
- Stephen Vincent Benét (1898–1943), poet
- Ruth Buzzi (1936-2025), comedian and actress
- Dorothy Comingore (1913–1971), Citizen Kane actress, died in Stonington
- Edmund Fanning (1769–1841), explorer
- Nathaniel Fanning (1755–1805), Revolutionary War hero
- Sergio Franchi (1926–1990), Italian tenor
- Richard "Skip" Arthur Hayward (born 1947), first tribal chairman of the Mashantucket Pequot Indian Tribe
- Mrs. Julian Heath (1863–1932), American radio personality
- Wally Kopf (1899–1979), Baseball player for the New York Giants.
- J. D. McClatchy (1945–2018), poet and opera librettist
- James Merrill (1926–1995), Pulitzer Prize-winning poet
- Thomas Minor (1608–1690), founder of Stonington
- Nathaniel Palmer (1799–1877), explorer, sailing captain, and ship designer
- Walter Palmer (1585–1661), founder of Stonington
- Eleanor Perenyi (1918–2009), garden essayist
- Greg "Fossilman" Raymer (born 1964), 2004 World Series of Poker champion
- Rob Simmons (born 1943), former congressman, First Selectman
- Edmund C. Stanton (1854–1901), General director of the Metropolitan Opera
- Grace Zaring Stone (1891–1991), novelist
- Edward Trumbull (1884–1968), painter
- Edward P. York (1863–1928), architect
- Fred R. Zeller (1899–1978), politician
- William Chesebrough (1594-1667) Town Founder, Farmer, Merchant, & Politician
