= Thomas Minor =

Early New England settler (1608–1690)

- Born: April 23, 1608; Chew Magna, Somerset, England
- Died: October 23, 1690 (aged 82); Stonington, Connecticut
- Resting place: Wequetequock Cemetery; 41.35993°N 71.87673°W
- Known for: Founder of New London and Stonington, Connecticut
- Spouse: Grace Palmer

Thomas Minor (April 23, 1608 – October 23, 1690) was a founder of New London and Stonington, Connecticut, United States, and an early colonial New England diarist.

== Early life and marriage ==
Minor was born in Chew Magna, in Somerset, England, on April 23, 1608, to Clement Miner (born February 23, 1585; died March 31, 1640). In 1629, he emigrated to Salem, Massachusetts, aboard the Lyon's Whelp. In the introduction of The Diary of Thomas Minor, Stonington, Connecticut 1653-1684, it states the name of the ship was the Arabella. It landed in Salem, Massachusetts on June 14, 1630. He quickly moved to Watertown, and then on to Charlestown, after typhus fever broke out in Salem.

In Charlestown, Minor met Grace Palmer, whom he married in 1634. She was the daughter of Walter Palmer. The couple eventually had seven sons and three daughters:

1. John Minor (1635–1719)
2. Clement Minor (1639–1700)
3. Thomas Miner (1640–1662)
4. Ephraim Miner (1642–1724)
5. Joseph Miner (1644–1712)
6. Manassah Minor (1647–1728)
7. Ann Minor (1648-?)
8. Marie Minor (1651–1660)
9. Samuel Minor (1652–1682)
10. Hannah Minor (1655–1721)

In 1636, the Minors moved to Hingham.

This "Minor coat of arms" was discredited in 1984

== Settling Stonington ==
After several years in Hingham, the family moved south to the Wequetequock area of present-day Stonington, Connecticut, where Minor and his son Ephraim helped found the Road Church.

In about 1653, Minor bought land west of Stonington, across Quiambaug Cove near present-day Mystic, and built a house for his family. Around this time he began one of the few diaries to survive 17th-century New England. It covers the years 1653 to 1684 and was published in book form in 1899.

Minor was active in public affairs in both New London and Stonington. He was commissioned as the captain of the Stonington militia company in 1665. Both he and his sons served during King Philip's War. His son, Lieutenant Thomas Minor, appears on the list of Connecticut men who volunteered for service in King Philip's War who were the original proprietors of Voluntown, Connecticut.

== Genealogy ==
Between 1683 and 1684, Minor contracted with an individual in England to investigate his genealogical line and determine how his surname was historically spelled (Minor versus Miner). The response he received is a classic example of fraudulent genealogy. The pedigree and family coat of arms sent back to Minor were proven to be mostly falsified in a 1984 study published by the New England Historic Genealogical Society.

== Death ==
Minor and his wife died three months apart in 1690 and are buried together in Stonington's Wequetequock Cemetery. The founders monument in Stonington has one side dedicated to him.

== Notable descendants ==
The Thomas Minor Society, founded in 1979, organizes gatherings of descendants, publishes a newsletter, and maintains cemeteries that have early members of the Minor/Miner family. It also publishes related books and materials, including his diaries.

Notable descendants include:

- Alec Baldwin
- Ulysses S. Grant
- Ned Lamont
- Alonzo Ames Miner
- Roy Waldo Miner
  - Dorothy Miner (historian)
  - Dwight C. Miner
    - Dorothy Miner (attorney)
- Thomas T. Minor
- William Chester Minor
- William T. Minor
- John D. Rockefeller
- John Treadwell
- Peggy Whitson
