= Walter Palmer (Puritan) =

Puritan settler in New England (1585–1661)

- Born: 1585
- Died: October 10, 1661 (aged 76)
- Resting place: Wequetequock Cemetery; 41.35993°N 71.87673°W
- Known for: Founder of New England settlements

Walter Palmer (1585–1661) was an early Separatist Puritan settler in the Massachusetts Bay Colony who helped found Charlestown and Rehoboth, Massachusetts and Stonington, Connecticut.

== Early life ==
Palmer was likely born in England about 1585. He married in England and fathered five children. Recent research suggests that he was probably from Frampton, Dorset, England ("Walter Palmer of the Great Migration: Probable Origins in Frampton, Dorset," New England Historical and Genealogical Register, [Vol. 174 Winter 2020; pages 21-25]).

== Emigration ==
Coat of Arms of Walter Palmer

Verbatim excerpt from Robert Charles Anderson, FASG [Fellow of the American Society of Genealogists], The Great Migration Directory: Immigrants to New England, 1620–1640; a Concise Compendium [Boston: New England Historical and Genealogical Society, 2015], 251:

“Palmer, Walter; … 1629; Charlestown, Rehoboth, Stonington …”

In contrast to other entries, Anderson does not name the ship on which Walter Palmer sailed. It is reported to be Four Sisters, leaving Gravesend, England on 24 Apr 1629 and arriving in Salem Massachusetts in July 1629

The next year, he was indicted on manslaughter charges for allegedly beating a man to death, but was acquitted in November 1630. His close friend William Chesebrough stood as a witness. Serving jurors/peers: William Rocknell, William Balsten, William Phelps, John Page, William Gallant, John, Balshe, John Hoskins & Lawrence Leach in the trial.

Palmer and Chesebrough took the Oath of a Freeman on May 18, 1631. In 1633, Palmer married Rebecca Short, his second wife, and they eventually had seven children together. In 1635, he was elected a selectman of Charlestown and the next year became constable.

== Founding Rehoboth ==
On August 24, 1643, Palmer and Chesebrough left Charlestown and started a new settlement called Seacuncke (later renamed Rehoboth). Palmer was among the first selectmen. When the settlement assigned itself to Plymouth Colony, the deputy elected to represent Rehoboth at the Plymouth court refused to serve because he preferred attachment to the Massachusetts Bay Colony. Palmer was then appointed in his place.

== Founding Stonington ==
Palmer and Chesebrough were also dissatisfied with the Plymouth alignment and, sometime prior to 1653, John Winthrop, Jr. persuaded Chesebrough to relocate to southern Connecticut. Chesebrough obtained a 2,300-acre (9 km^{2}) land grant from the settlement in New London, Connecticut; Palmer and his son-in-law Thomas Miner followed him and purchased land on the east bank of Wequetequock Cove, across from Chesebrough.

In August 1652, Miner built his father-in-law and himself a house on their land; the next year, both their families joined them, and other settlers soon followed. The group struggled for years for self-rule. During that time, Palmer served as constable and again as a selectman. It took until 1661 to build a church meetinghouse due to resistance from the General Court of Connecticut, which preferred that the colonists travel across the river to New London. Palmer died two months after the meetinghouse was first used.

The 300-year Stonington Chronology describes Palmer as the

...patriarch of the early Stonington settlers...(who) had been prominent in the establishment of Boston, Charlestown and Rehoboth ...a vigorous giant, 6 feet 5 inches tall. When he settled at Southertown (Stonington) he was sixty-eight years old, older than most of the other settlers.

== Notable descendants ==
- Thomas T. Minor
- Asaph Hall
- William Adams Palmer, Governor of and Senator from Vermont
- Thomas Witherell Palmer, U.S. Senator from Michigan
- Nathaniel Brown Palmer, explorer after whom Palmer Land, part of the Antarctic Peninsula, is named
- Lowell Palmer Weicker, Governor of, Senator from and Congressman from Connecticut.
- Ulysses Simpson Grant, 18th President of the United States
- Stephen Joseph Harper, 22nd prime minister of Canada
